= Thetis =

Nereid of Greek mythology

- Member of the Nereids
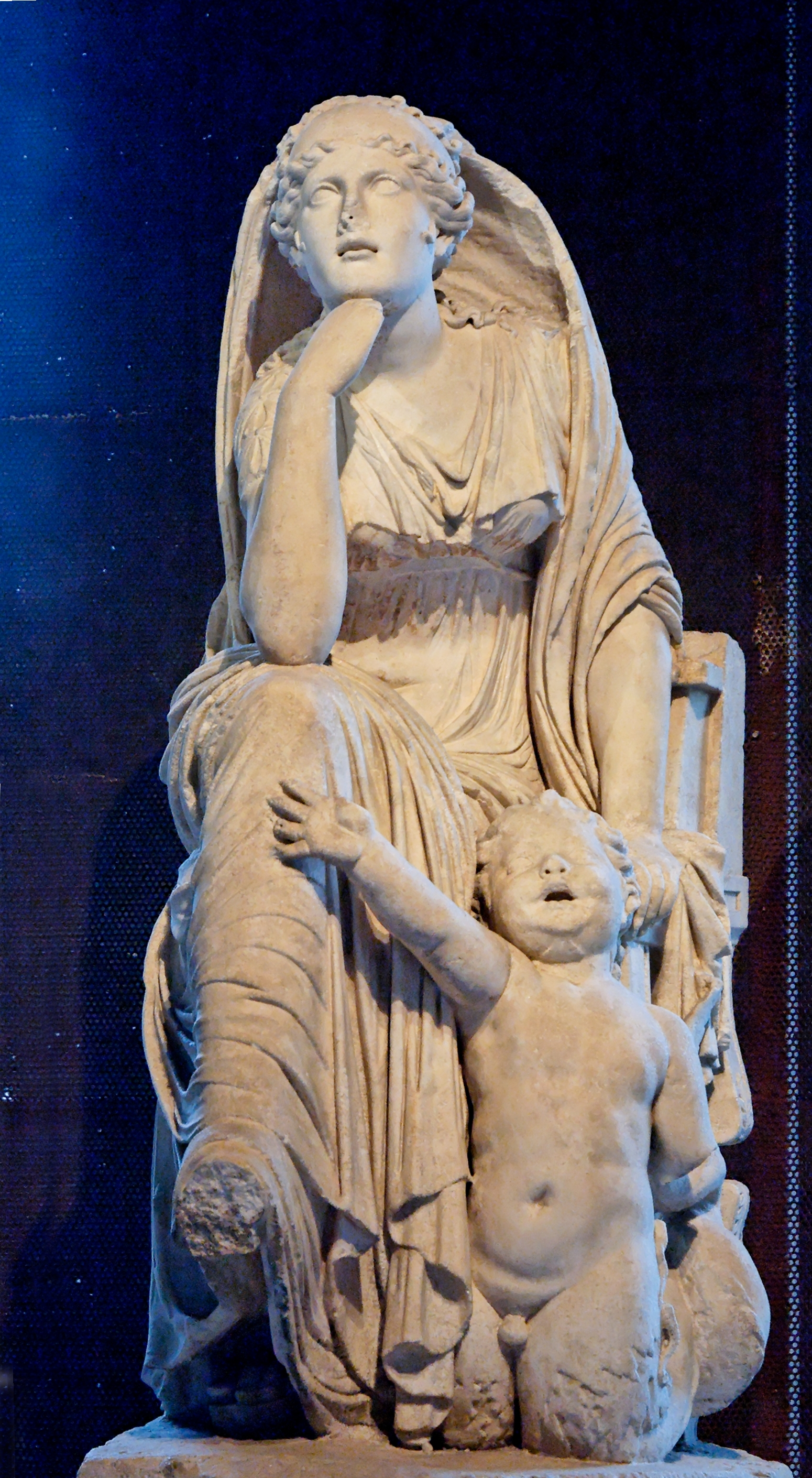
- Statue of Thetis with a young Triton, Roman copy
- Abode: the Sea

Genealogy
- Parents: Nereus and Doris
- Siblings: Nereids, Nerites
- Consort: Peleus
- Children: Achilles

Thetis (/ˈθiːtɪs/ THEEH-tiss, or /ˈθɛtɪs/ THEH-tiss; Ancient Greek: Θέτις, romanized: Thétis pronounced [tʰétis]) is a figure from Greek mythology with varying mythological roles. She mainly appears as a sea nymph, a goddess of water, and one of the 50 Nereids, daughters of the ancient sea god Nereus.

When described as a Nereid in Classical myths, Thetis was the daughter of Nereus and Doris, and a granddaughter of Tethys with whom she sometimes shares characteristics. Often she seems to lead the Nereids as they attend to her tasks. Sometimes she is also identified with Metis.

Only one written record, a fragment, attests to her worship in the archaic period; and an early Alcman hymn exists, that identifies Thetis as the creator of the universe. Worship of Thetis as the goddess is documented to have persisted in some regions by historical writers, such as Pausanias.

In the Trojan War cycle of myth, the wedding of Thetis and the Greek hero Peleus is one of the precipitating events in the war which also led to the birth of their child Achilles.

One of her epithets was Halosydne (Greek: Ἁλοσύδνη), meaning "sea-nourished" or "sea-born" goddess.

== As a goddess ==
Most extant material about Thetis concerns her role as mother of Achilles, but there is some evidence that she was more central to the religious beliefs and practices of Archaic Greece in her role as a sea-goddess. The pre-modern etymology of her name, from tithemi (τίθημι), "to set up, establish", suggests a perception among Classical Greeks of an early political role. Walter Burkert considers her name a transformed doublet of Tethys.

After Achilles's death, Thetis does not need to appeal to Zeus for immortality for her son, as the two have an established rapport (due to Thetis helping him in a dispute with three other Olympians) and snatches him away to the White Island Leuke in the Black Sea, an alternate Elysium, where he has transcended death, and where an Achilles cult lingered into historical times.

== Mythology ==
=== Thetis and the other deities ===
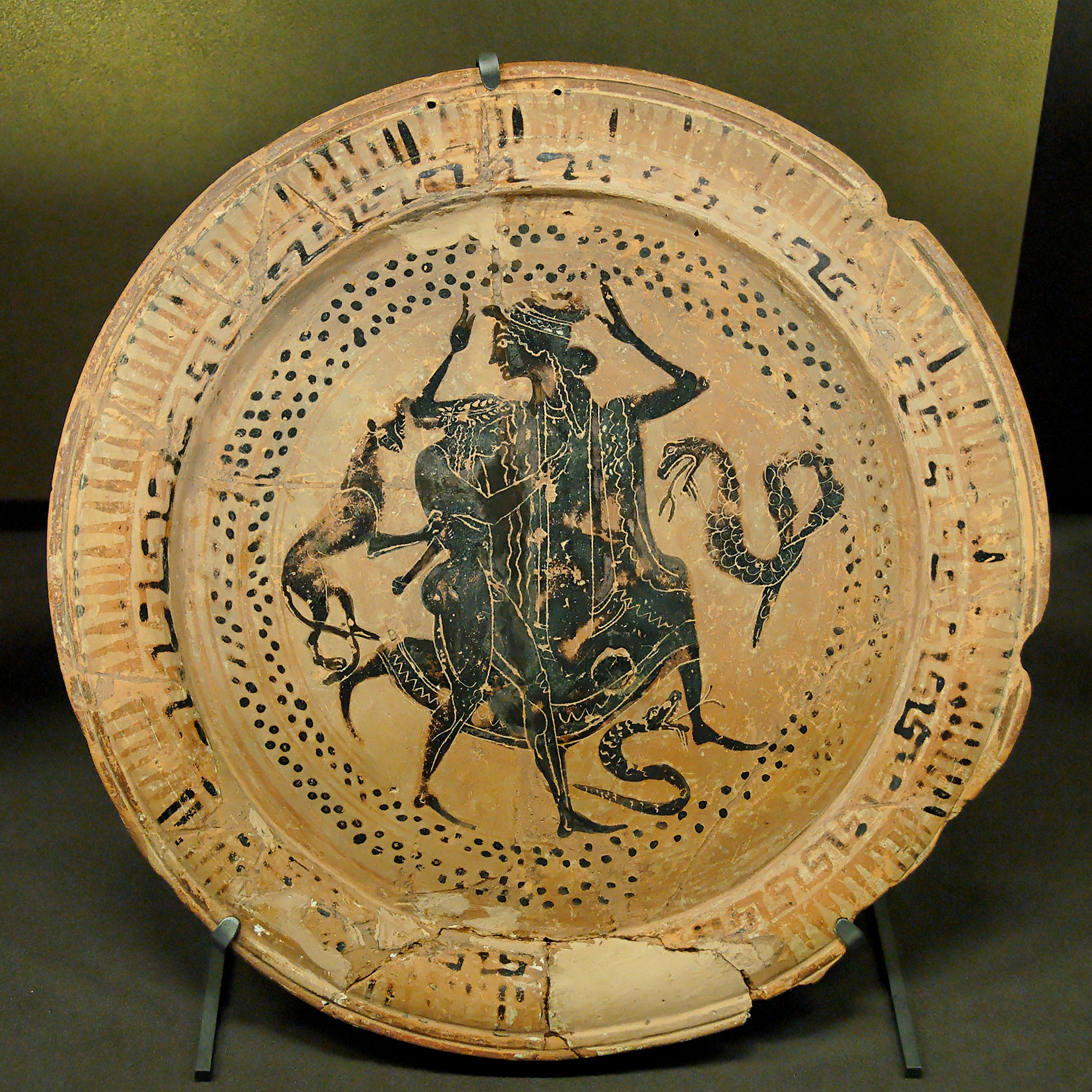
Immortal Thetis with the mortal Peleus in the foreground, Boeotian black-figure dish, c. 500–475 BC - Louvre

Pseudo-Apollodorus's Bibliotheke asserts that Thetis was courted by both Zeus and Poseidon, but she was married off to the mortal Peleus because of their fears about the prophecy by Themis (or Prometheus, or Calchas, according to others) that her son would become greater than his father. Thus, she is revealed as a figure of cosmic capacity, quite capable of unsettling the divine order.

When Hephaestus was thrown from Olympus, whether cast out by Hera for his lameness or evicted by Zeus for taking Hera's side, the Oceanid Eurynome and the Nereid Thetis caught him and allowed him to stay on the volcanic isle of Lemnos, while he labored for them as a smith, "working there in the hollow of the cave, and the stream of Okeanos around us went on forever with its foam and its murmur" (Iliad 18.369).

Thetis is not successful in her role protecting and nurturing a hero (the theme of kourotrophos), but her role in succoring deities is emphatically repeated by Homer. Diomedes recalls that when Dionysus was expelled by Lycurgus with the Olympians' aid, he took refuge in the Erythraean Sea with Thetis in a bed of seaweed (6.123ff). These accounts associate Thetis with "a divine past—uninvolved with human events—with a level of divine invulnerability extraordinary by Olympian standards. Where within the framework of the Iliad the ultimate recourse is to Zeus for protection, here the poem seems to point to an alternative structure of cosmic relations."

Once, Thetis and Medea argued in Thessaly over which was the most beautiful; they appointed the Cretan Idomeneus as the judge, who gave the victory to Thetis. In her anger, Medea called all Cretans liars, and cursed them to never say the truth.

=== Marriage to Peleus ===
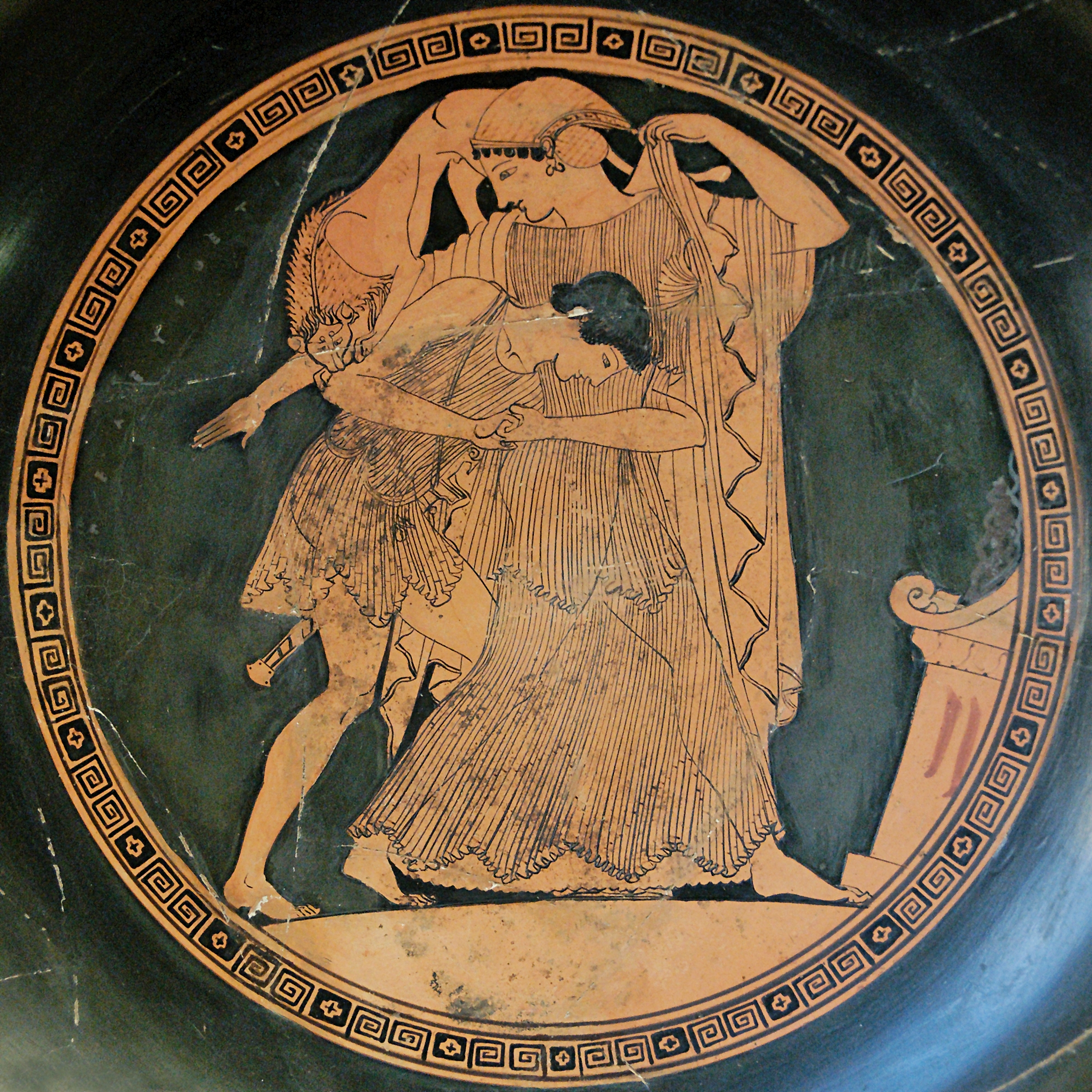
Thetis changing into a lioness as she is attacked by Peleus, Attic red-figured kylix by Douris, c. 490 BC from Vulci, Etruria - Bibliothèque nationale de France in Paris

Zeus had received a prophecy that Thetis's son would become greater than his father, as Zeus had dethroned his father to lead the succeeding pantheon. In order to ensure a mortal father for her eventual offspring, Zeus and his brother Poseidon made arrangements for her to marry a human, Peleus, son of Aeacus, but she refused him.

Proteus, an early sea-god, advised Peleus to find the sea nymph when she was asleep and bind her tightly to keep her from escaping by changing forms. She did shapeshift, becoming flame, water, a raging lioness, and a serpent. Peleus held fast. Subdued, she then consented to marry him. Thetis is the mother of Achilles by Peleus, who became king of the Myrmidons.

According to classical mythology, the wedding of Thetis and Peleus was celebrated on Mount Pelion, outside the cave of Chiron, and attended by the deities: there they celebrated the marriage with feasting. Apollo played the lyre and the Muses sang, Pindar claimed. At the wedding Chiron gave Peleus an ashen spear that had been polished by Athena and had a blade forged by Hephaestus. While the Olympian goddesses brought him gifts: from Aphrodite, a bowl with an embossed Eros, from Hera a chlamys while from Athena a flute. His father-in-law Nereus endowed him a basket of the salt called 'divine', which has an irresistible virtue for overeating, appetite and digestion, explaining the expression 'she poured the divine salt'. Zeus then bestowed the wings of Arce to the newly-wed couple which was later given by Thetis to her son, Achilles. Furthermore, the god of the sea, Poseidon gave Peleus the immortal horses, Balius and Xanthus. Eris, the goddess of discord, had not been invited, however, and in spite, she threw a golden apple into the midst of the goddesses that was to be awarded only "to the fairest." In most interpretations, the award was made during the Judgement of Paris and eventually occasioned the Trojan War.

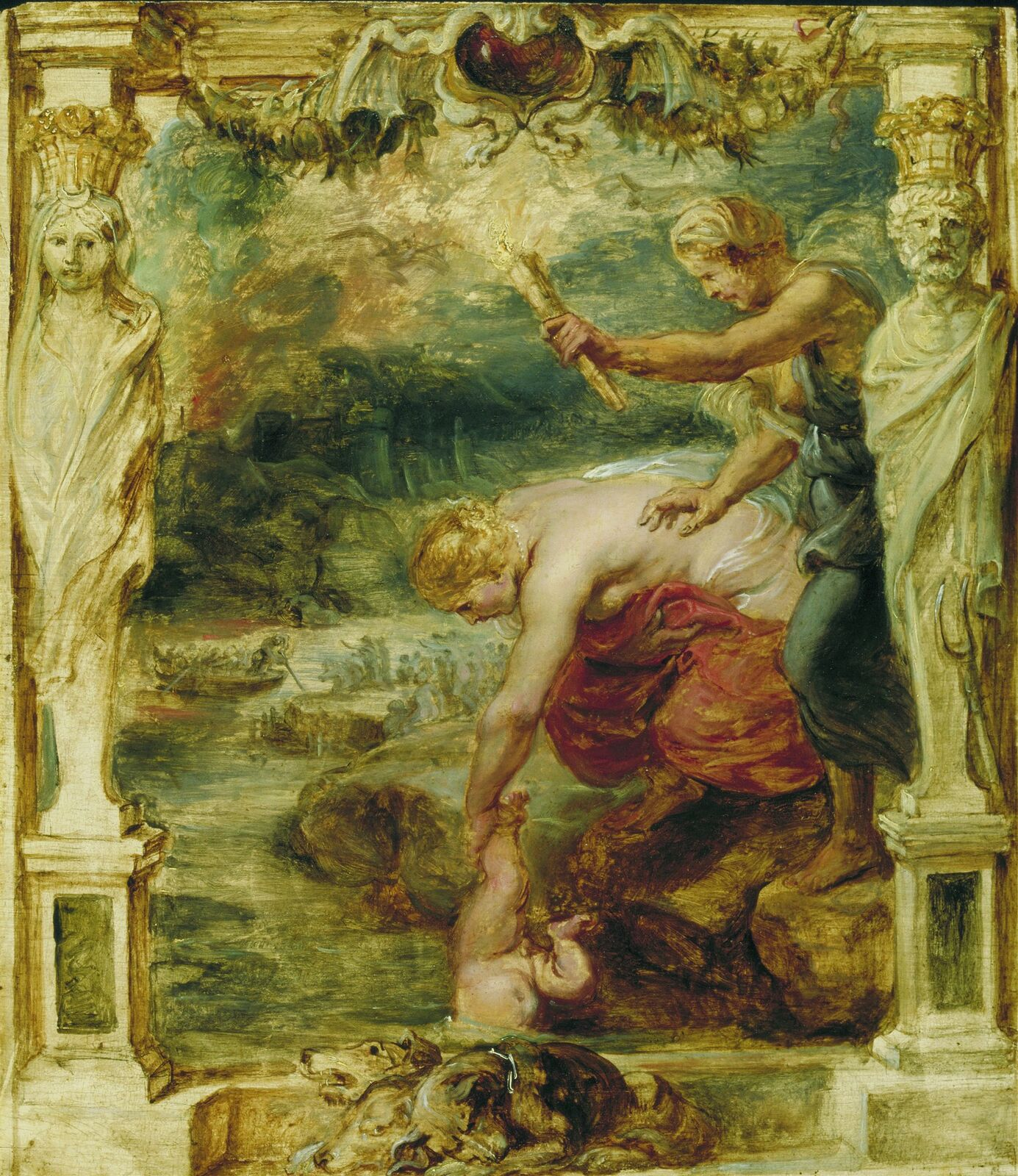
Thetis dips Achilles in the Styx by Peter Paul Rubens (between 1630 and 1635)

As is recounted in the Argonautica, written by the Hellenistic poet Apollonius of Rhodes, Thetis, in an attempt to make her son Achilles immortal, would burn away his mortality in a fire at night and during the day, she would anoint the child with ambrosia. When Peleus caught her searing the baby, he let out a cry.

Thetis heard him, and catching up the child threw him screaming to the ground, and she like a breath of wind passed swiftly from the hall as a dream and leapt into the sea, exceeding angry, and thereafter returned never again.

Some myths relate that because she had been interrupted by Peleus, Thetis had not made her son physically invulnerable. His heel, which she was about to burn away when her husband stopped her, had not been protected. (A similar myth of immortalizing a child in fire is seen in the case of Demeter and the infant Demophoon). In a variant of the myth first recounted in the Achilleid, an unfinished epic written between 94 and 95 AD by the Roman poet Statius, Thetis tried to make Achilles invulnerable by dipping him in the River Styx (one of the five rivers that run through Hades, the realm of the dead). However, the heel by which she held him was not touched by the Styx's waters and failed to be protected.

Peleus gave the boy to Chiron to raise. Prophecy said that the son of Thetis would have either a long but dull life, or a glorious but brief one. When the Trojan War broke out, Thetis was anxious and concealed Achilles, disguised as a girl, at the court of Lycomedes, king of Scyros. Achilles was already famed for his speed and skill in battle. Calchas, a priest of Agamemnon, prophesied the need for the great soldier within their ranks. Odysseus was subsequently sent by Agamemnon to try to find Achilles. Scyros was relatively close to Achilles's home and Lycomedes was also a known friend of Thetis, so it was one of the first places that Odysseus looked. When Odysseus found that one of the girls at court was not a girl, he came up with a plan. Raising an alarm that they were under attack, Odysseus knew that the young Achilles would instinctively run for his weapons and armour, thereby revealing himself. Seeing that she could no longer prevent her son from realizing his destiny, Thetis then had Hephaestus make a shield and armor. According to the Hellenistic poet Phylarchus, Thetis once went to Hephaestus to ask him to forge weapons for her son Achilles, and he agreed on the condition that she would sleep with him. Thetis agreed, and when Hephaestus had completed the weapons she asked to put on the armor to make sure it would fit Achilles, for she was the same size as him. Now armed, Thetis fled Hephaestus' amorous advances, and because he could not run after her, he wounded her in the ankle with his hammer. Thetis was healed in a Thessalian town that was therefore called Thetidium, after her.

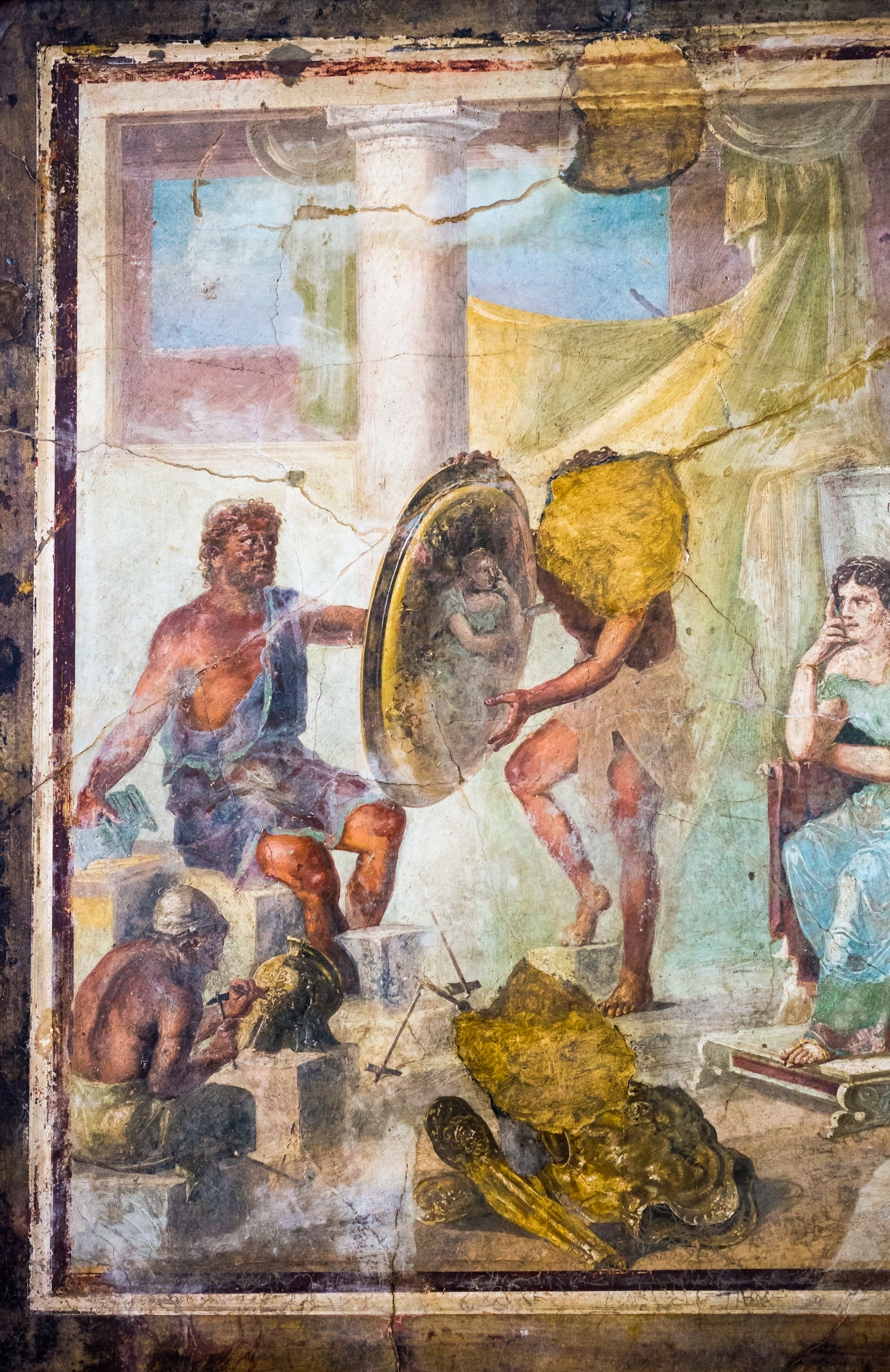
Thetis at Hephaestus's forge waiting to receive Achilles's new weapons. Fresco from Pompeii

=== Iliad and the Trojan War ===
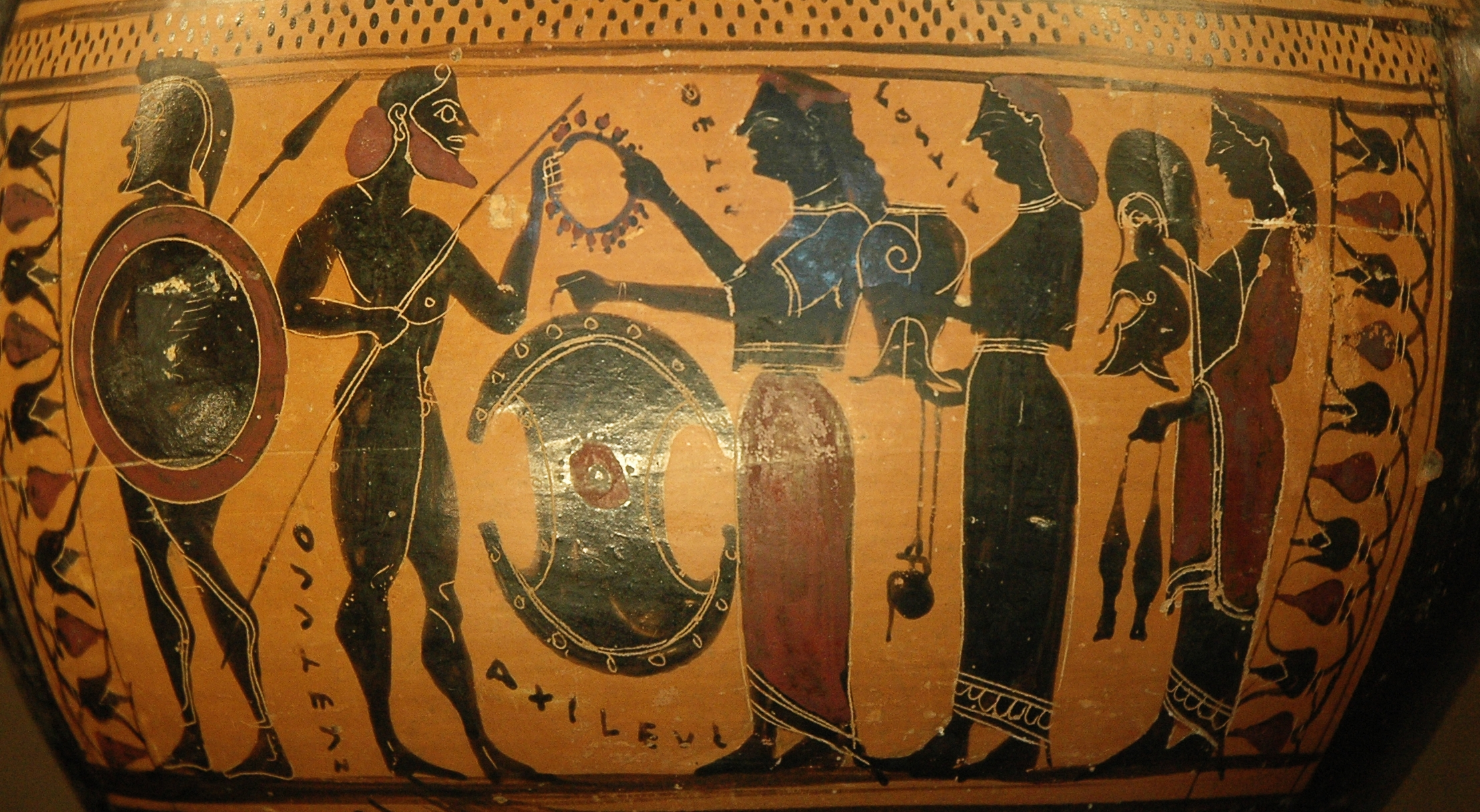
Thetis and attendants bring armor she had prepared for him to Achilles, an Attic black-figure hydria, c. 575–550 BC, Louvre

Thetis played a key part in the events of the Trojan War. Beyond the fact that the Judgement of Paris, which kicked off the war, occurred at her wedding to Peleus, Thetis consistently influenced the actions of the Twelve Olympians and her son, Achilles.

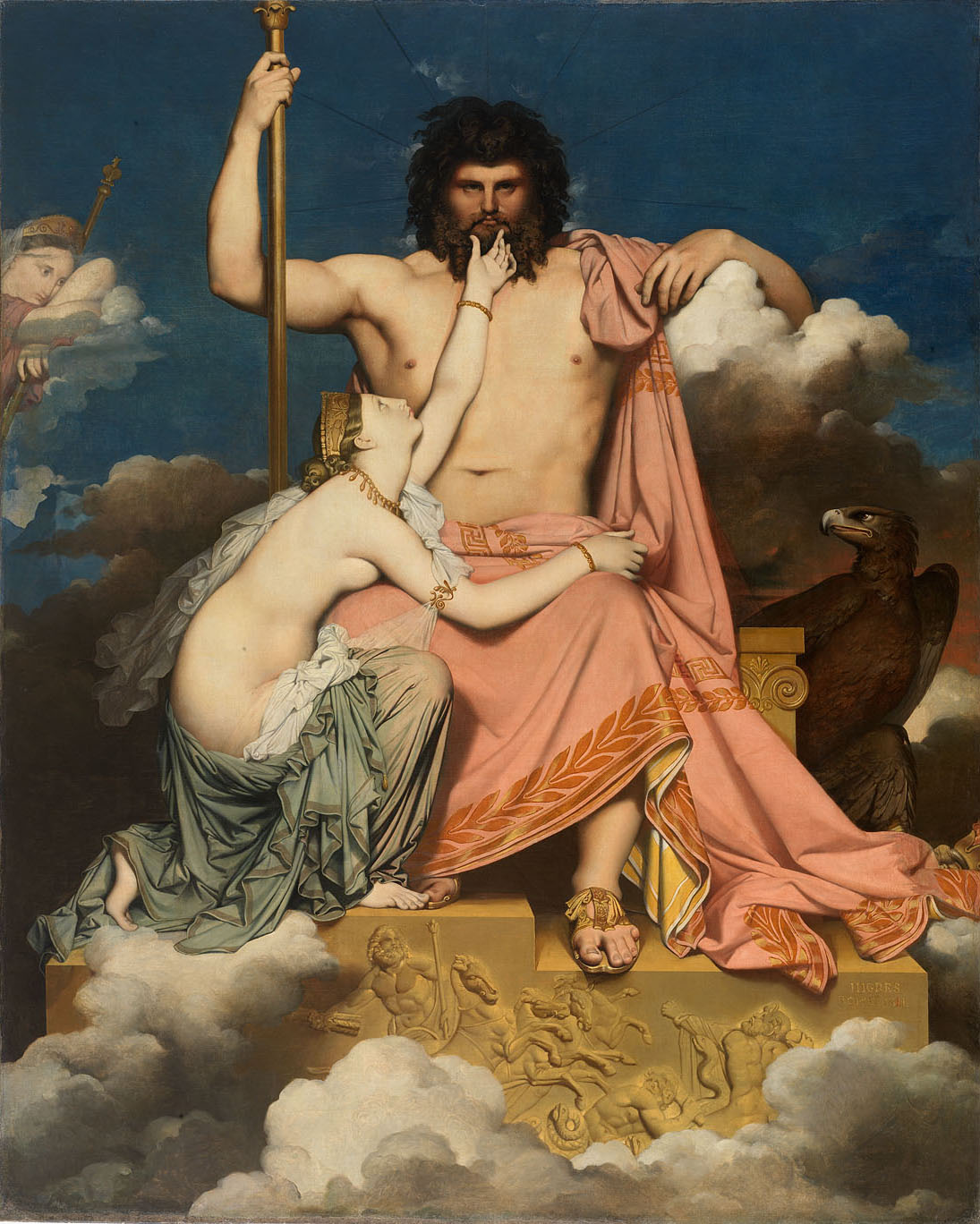
Jupiter and Thetis, Ingres: "She sank to the ground beside him, put her left arm round his knees, raised her right hand to touch his chin, and so made her petition to the Royal Son of Cronos" (Iliad, I)

Nine years after the beginning of the Trojan War, Homer's Iliad starts with Agamemnon (king of Mycenae and the commander of the Achaeans) and Achilles (son of Thetis) arguing over Briseis, a woman married to Mynes (son of the king of Lyrnessus). She was kidnapped and enslaved by Achilles. After initially refusing, Achilles relents and gives Briseis to Agamemnon. However, Achilles feels disrespect for having to hand over Briseis and prays to Thetis, his mother, for restitution of his lost honor. She urges Achilles to wait until she speaks with Zeus to rejoin the fighting, and Achilles listens. When she finally speaks to Zeus, Thetis convinces him to do as she bids, and he seals his agreement with her by bowing his head, the strongest oath that he can make.

Following the death of Patroclus, who wore Achilles's armor in the fighting, Thetis comes to Achilles to console him in his grief. She vows to return to him with armor forged by Hephaestus, the blacksmith of the gods, and tells him not to arm himself for battle until he sees her coming back. While Thetis is gone, Achilles is visited by Iris, the messenger of the gods, sent by Hera, who tells him to rejoin the fighting. He refuses, however, citing his mother's words and his promise to her to wait for her return. Thetis, meanwhile, speaks with Hephaestus and begs him to make Achilles armor, which he does. First, he makes for Achilles a splendid shield, and having finished it, makes a breastplate, a helmet, and greaves. When Thetis goes back to Achilles to deliver his new armor, she finds him still upset over Patroclus. Achilles fears that while he is off fighting the Trojans, Patroclus's body will decay and rot. Thetis, however, reassures him and places ambrosia and nectar in Patroclus's nose in order to protect his body against decay.

After Achilles uses his new armor to defeat Hector in battle, he keeps Hector's body to mutilate and humiliate. However, after nine days, the gods call Thetis to Olympus and tell her that she must go to Achilles and pass him a message, that the gods are angry that Hector's body has not been returned. She does as she is bid, and convinces Achilles to return the body for ransom, thus avoiding the wrath of the gods.

== Worship in Laconia and other places ==
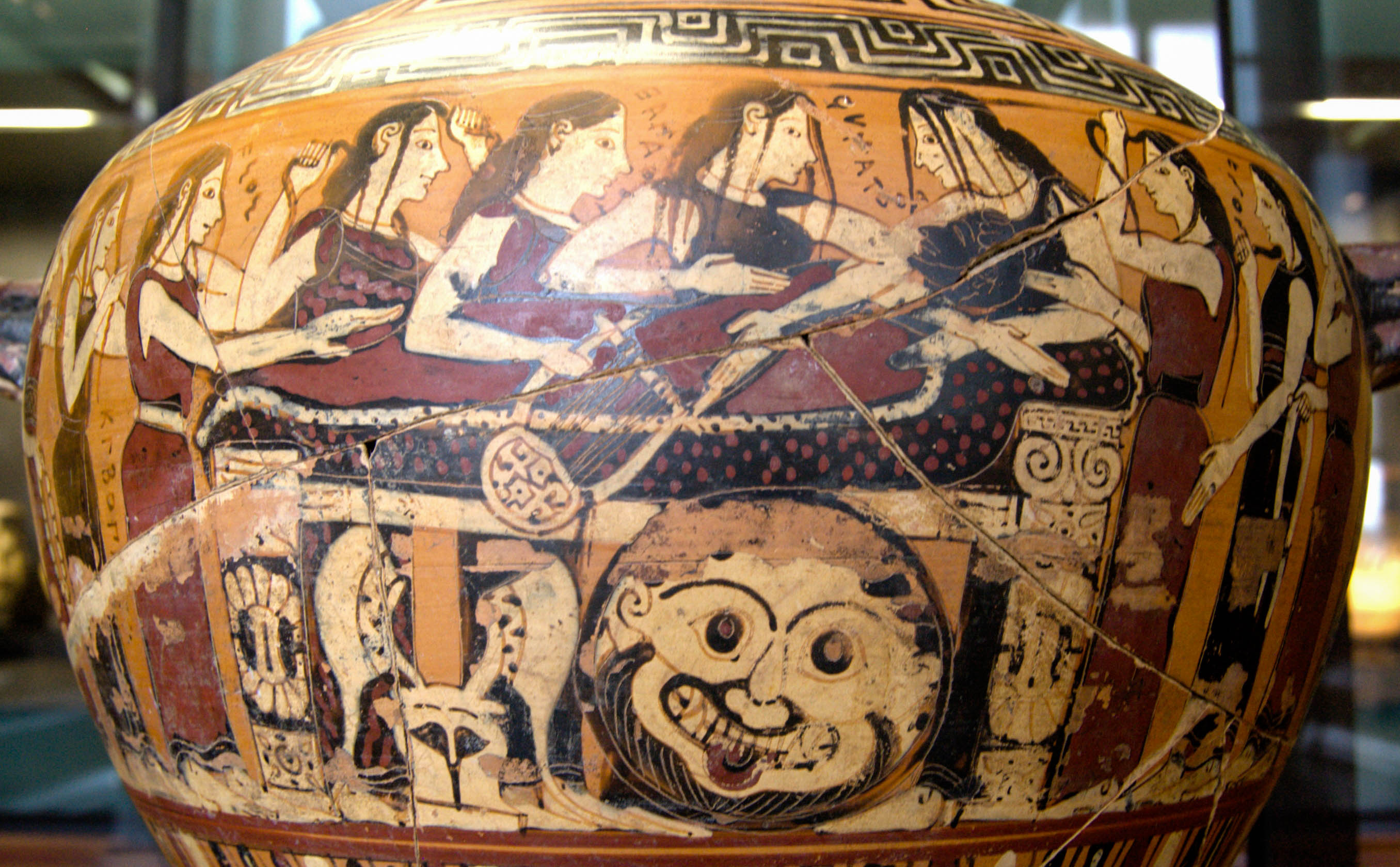
Thetis and the Nereids mourning Achilles, Corinthian black-figure hydria, 560–550 BC; note the Gorgon shield, Louvre

A noted exception to the general observation resulting from the existing historical records, that Thetis was not venerated as a goddess by cult, was in conservative Laconia, where Pausanias was informed that there had been priestesses of Thetis in archaic times, when a cult that was centered on a wooden cult image of Thetis (a xoanon), which preceded the building of the oldest temple; by the intervention of a highly placed woman, her cult had been re-founded with a temple; and in the second century AD she still was being worshipped with utmost reverence. The Lacedaemonians were at war with the Messenians, who had revolted, and their king Anaxander, having invaded Messenia, took as prisoners certain women, and among them Cleo, priestess of Thetis. The wife of Anaxander asked for this Cleo from her husband, and discovering that she had the wooden image of Thetis, she set up the woman Cleo in a temple for the goddess. This Leandris did because of a vision in a dream, but the wooden image of Thetis is guarded in secret.

In one fragmentary hymn by the seventh-century BC Spartan poet Alcman, Thetis appears as a demiurge, beginning her creation with poros (πόρος) 'path, track' and tekmor (τέκμωρ) 'marker, end-post'; third was skotos (σκότος) 'darkness', and then the Sun and the Moon. A close connection has been argued between Thetis and Metis, another shapeshifting sea-power later beloved by Zeus, that was bound by prophecy to bear a son greater than his father.

Herodotus noted that the Persians sacrificed to "Thetis" at Cape Sepias. By the process of interpretatio graeca, Herodotus identifies a sea-goddess of another culture (probably Anahita) as the familiar Hellenic "Thetis".

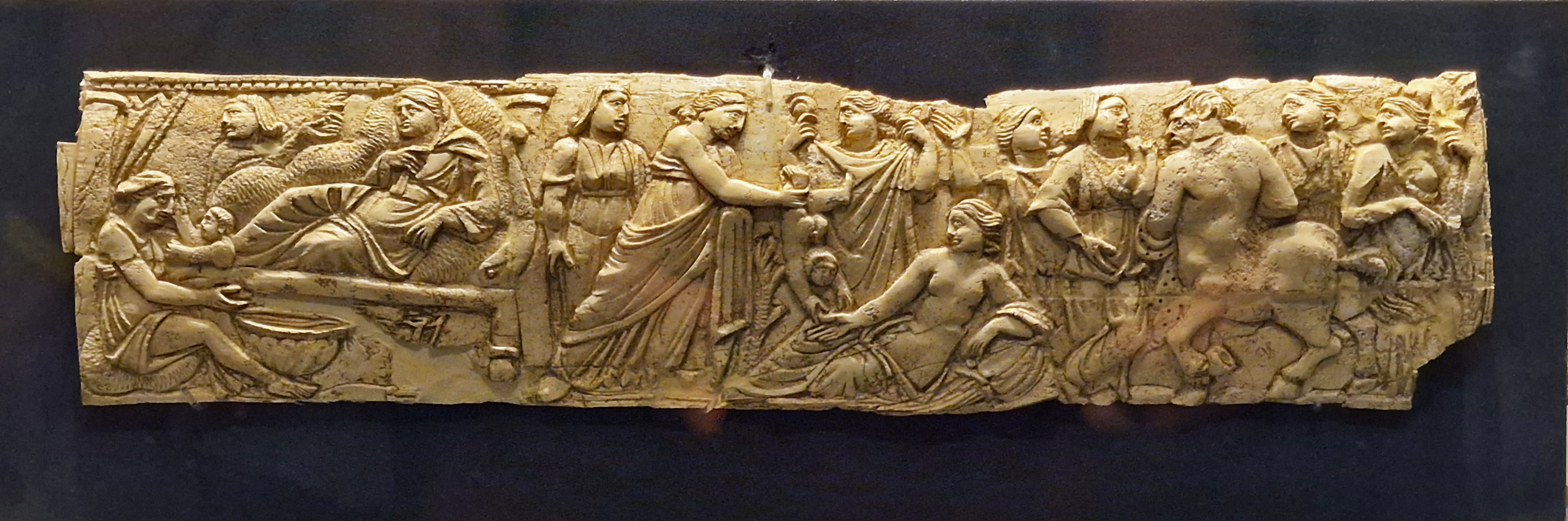
Ivory plaque depicting Thetis birthing and dipping Achilles in Styx, 4th century AD, from Eleutherna in Crete

== In other works ==
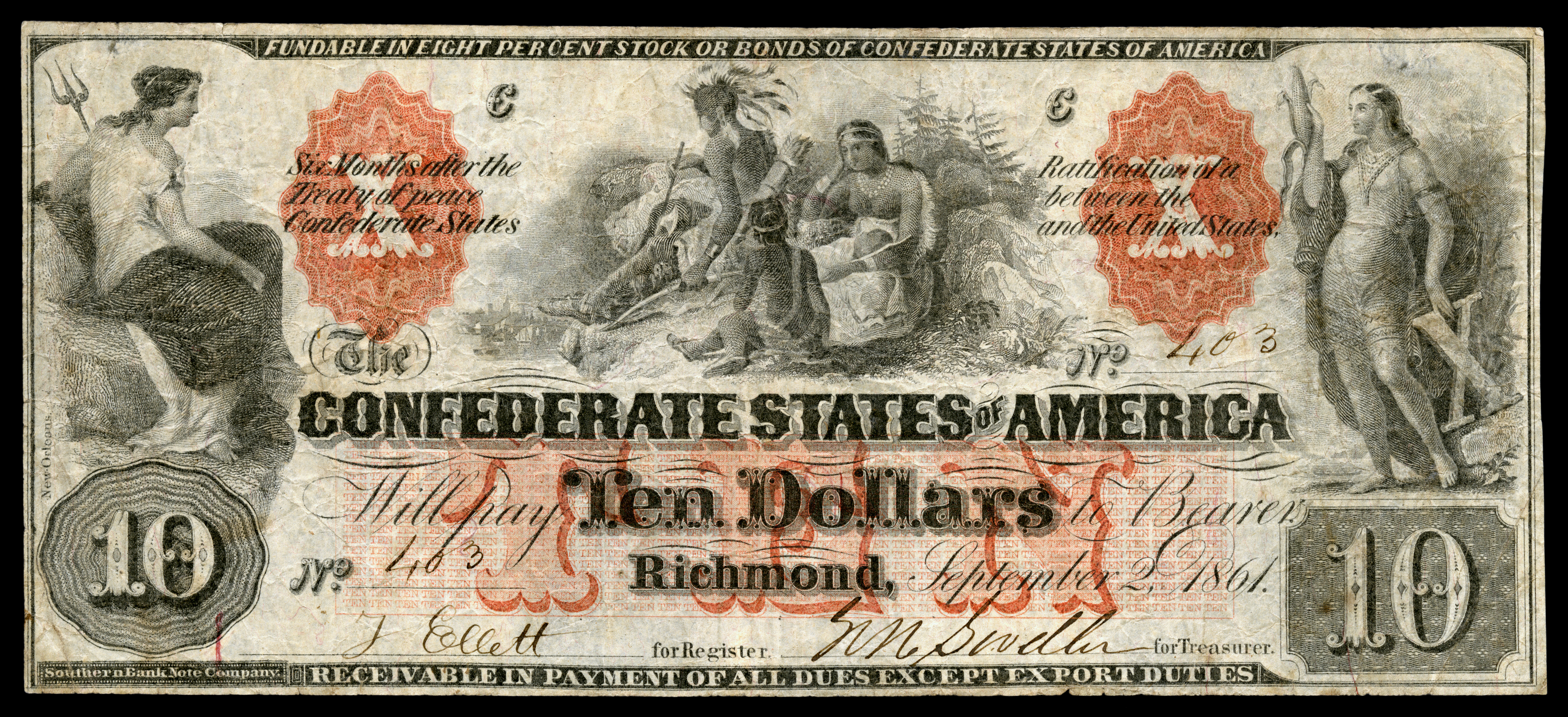
Thetis depicted (left) on a CSA $10 bill in 1861–62

- Homer's Iliad makes many references to Thetis.
- Euripides's Andromache, 1232–1272.
- Apollonius Rhodius, Argonautica IV, 770–879.
- Bibliotheca 3.13.5.
- Francesco Cavalli's first opera Le nozze di Teti e di Peleo, composed in 1639, concerned the marriage of Thetis and Peleus.
- WH Auden's poem The Shield of Achilles imagines Thetis's witnessing of the forging of Achilles's shield.
- In 1939, HMS Thetis (N25), then a new design of submarine, sank on her trials in the River Mersey shortly after she left the dock in Liverpool. There were 103 people on board and 99 died. The cause of the accident was an inspection hole to allow a sailor to look into the torpedo tubes. A special closure for this inspection hole had been painted over. Once submerged the torpedo tube flooded and the bow of the vessel sank. The stern was still above water. Ninety-nine people, half of them dockyard workers, died of carbon monoxide poisoning.
- In 1981, British actress Maggie Smith portrayed Thetis in the Ray Harryhausen film Clash of the Titans (for which she won a Saturn Award). In the film, she acts as the main antagonist to the hero Perseus for the mistreatment of her son Calibos.
- In 2004, British actress Julie Christie portrayed Thetis in the Wolfgang Petersen film Troy.
- Os Lusíadas

== Gallery ==
=== Thetis, Peleus and Zeus ===
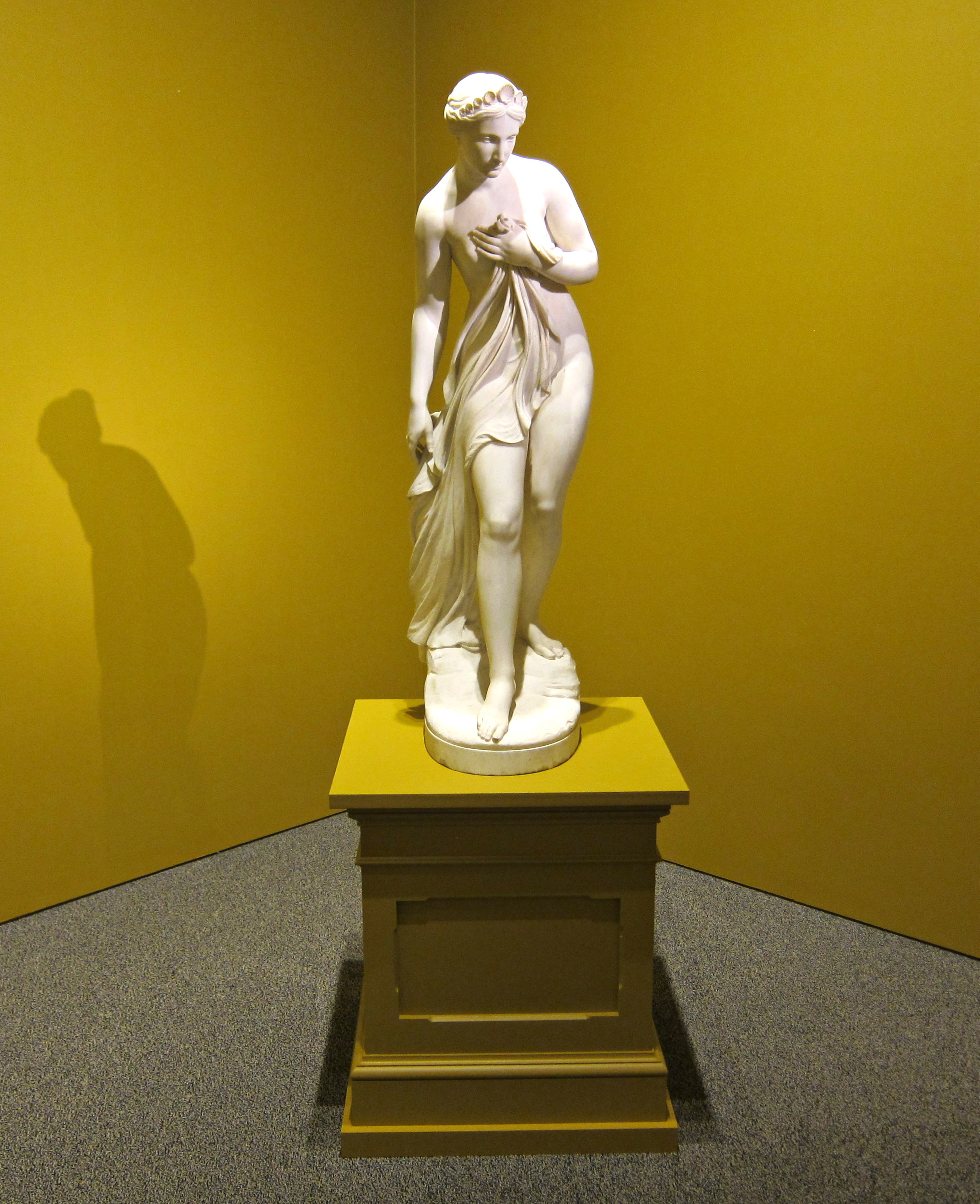

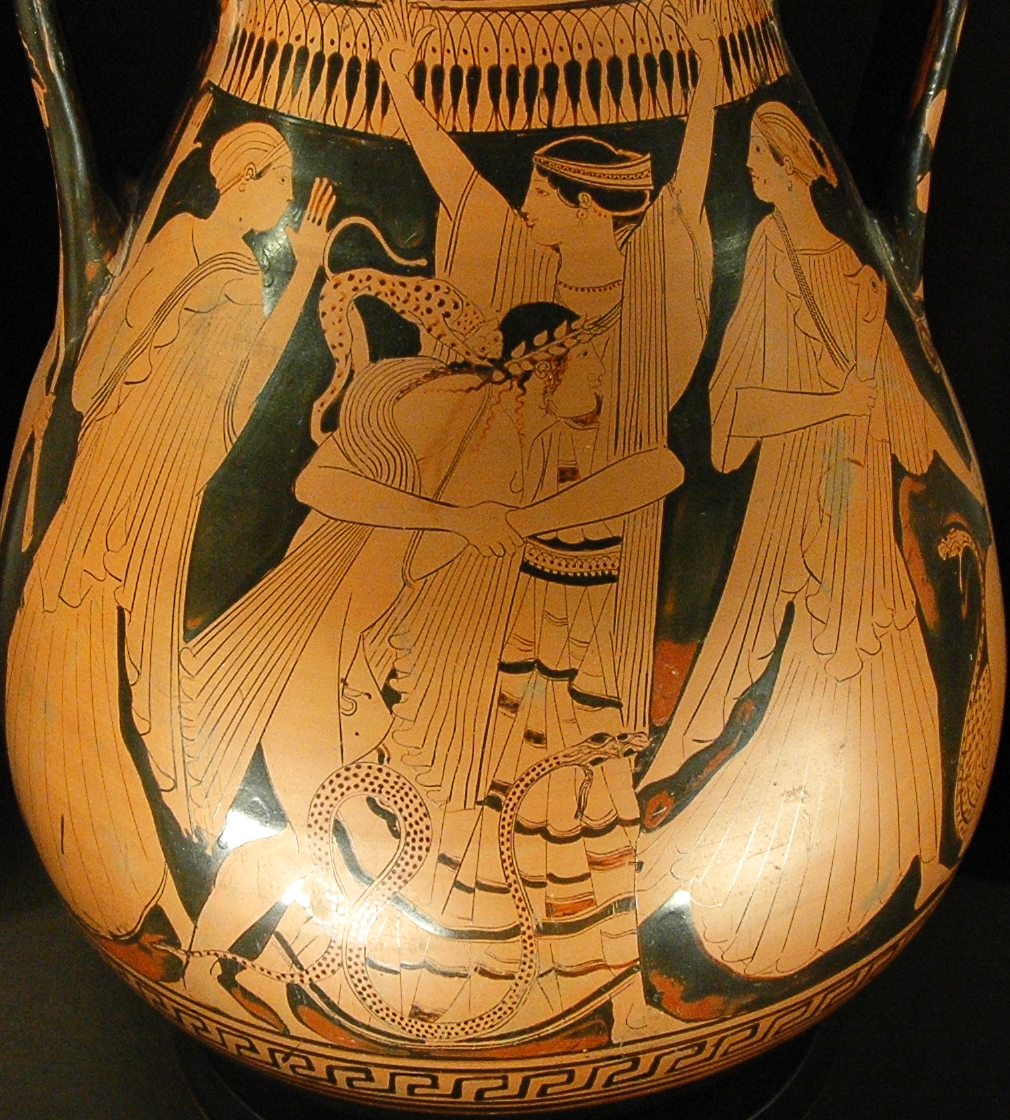

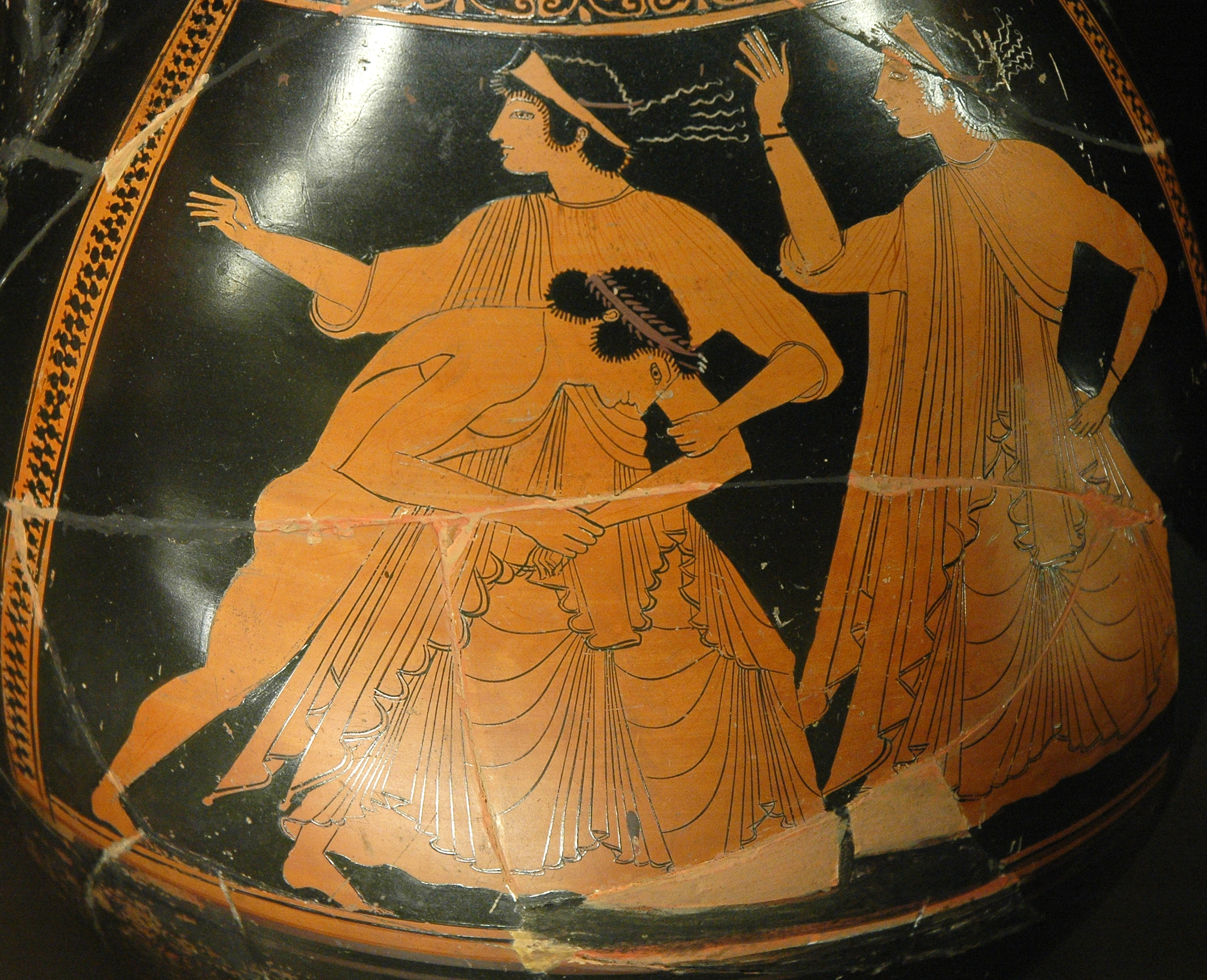

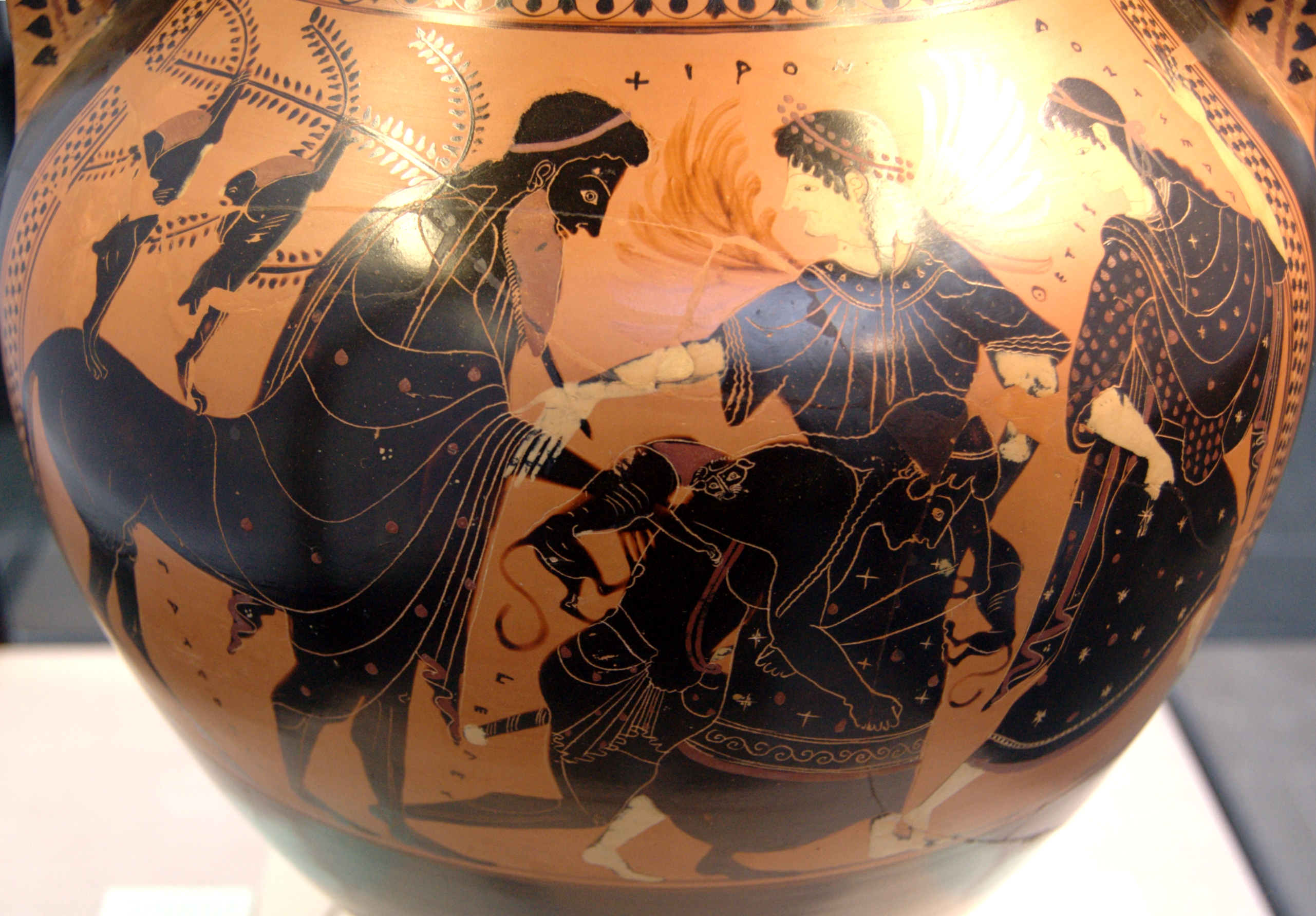

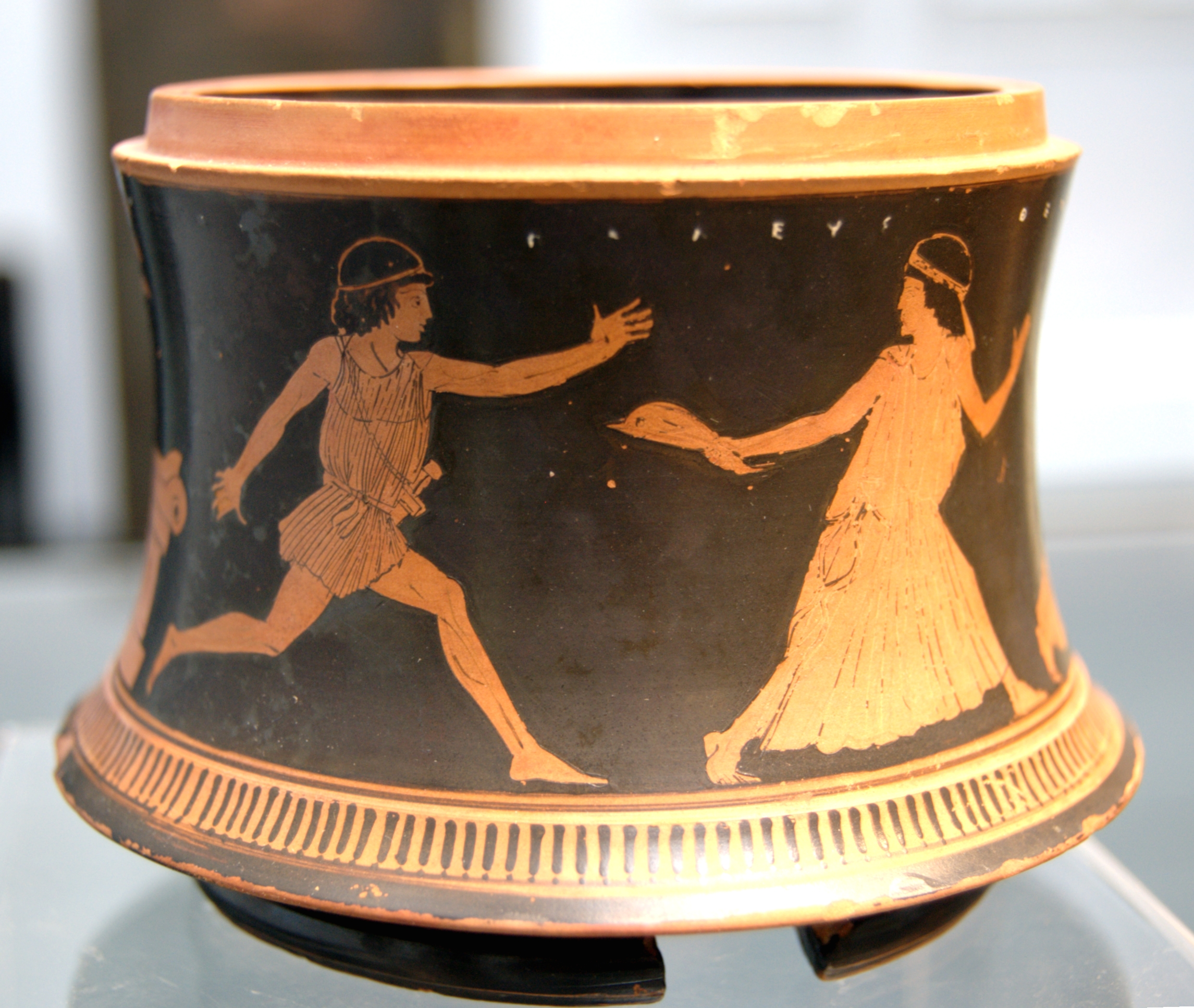

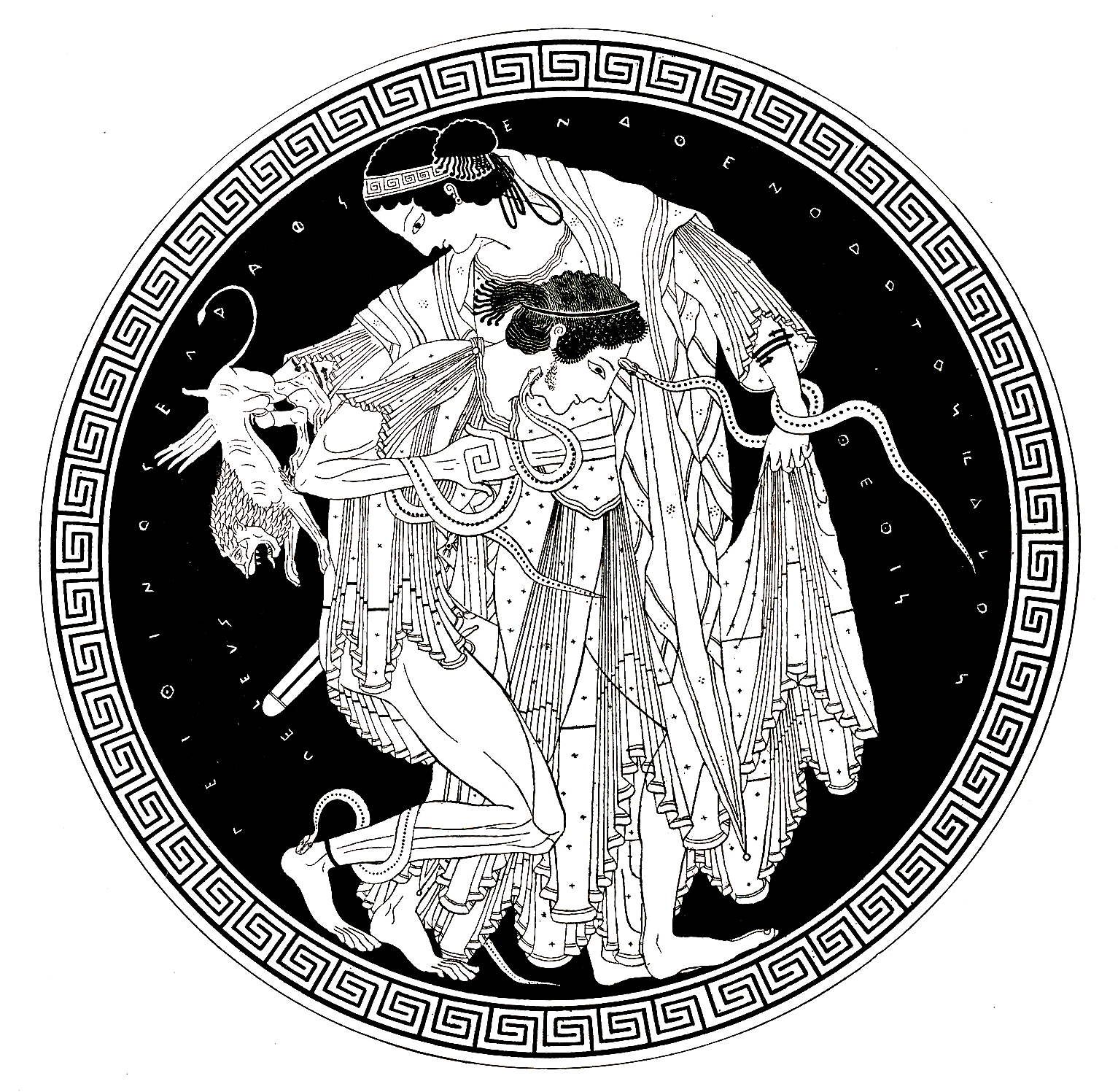

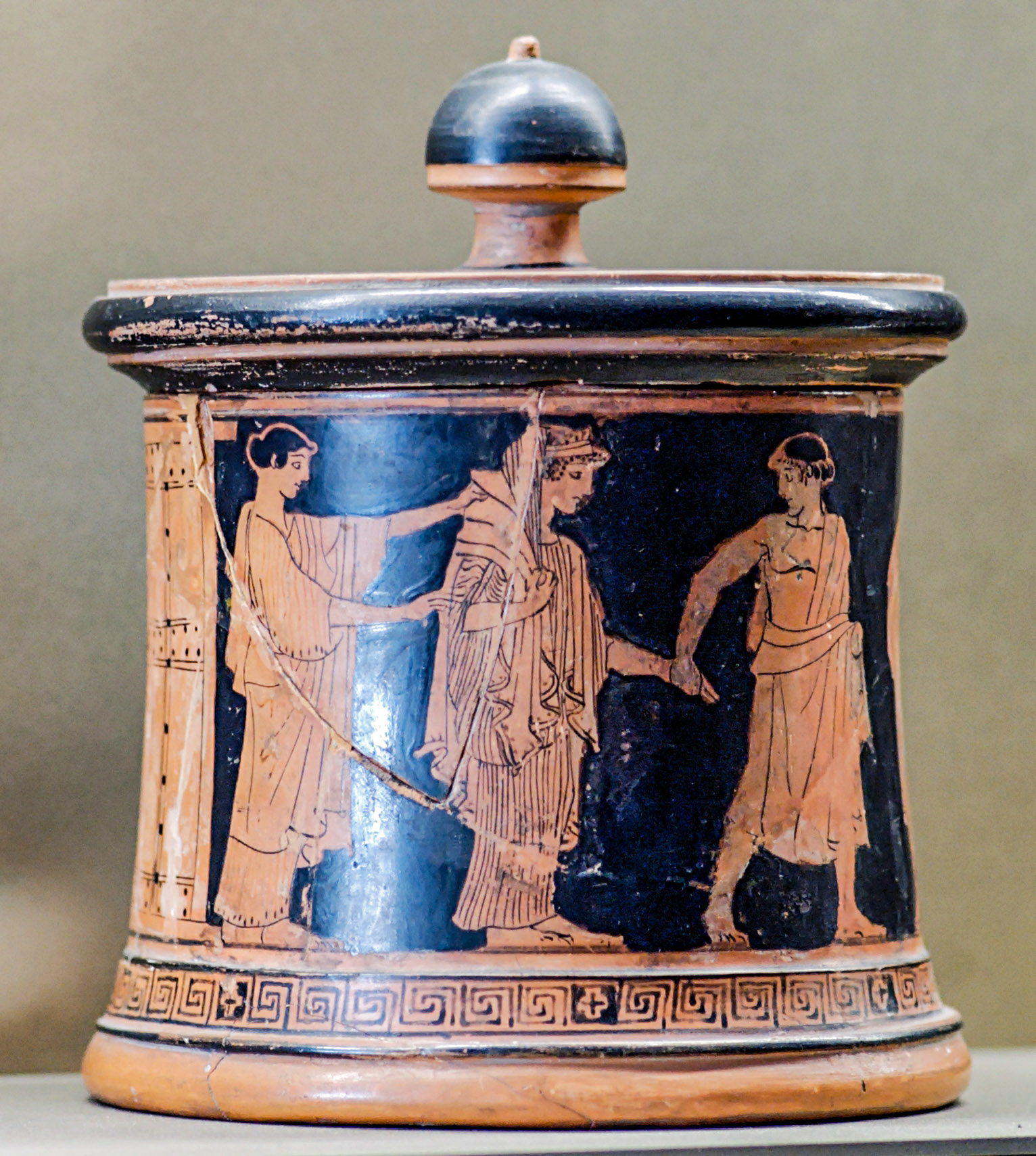

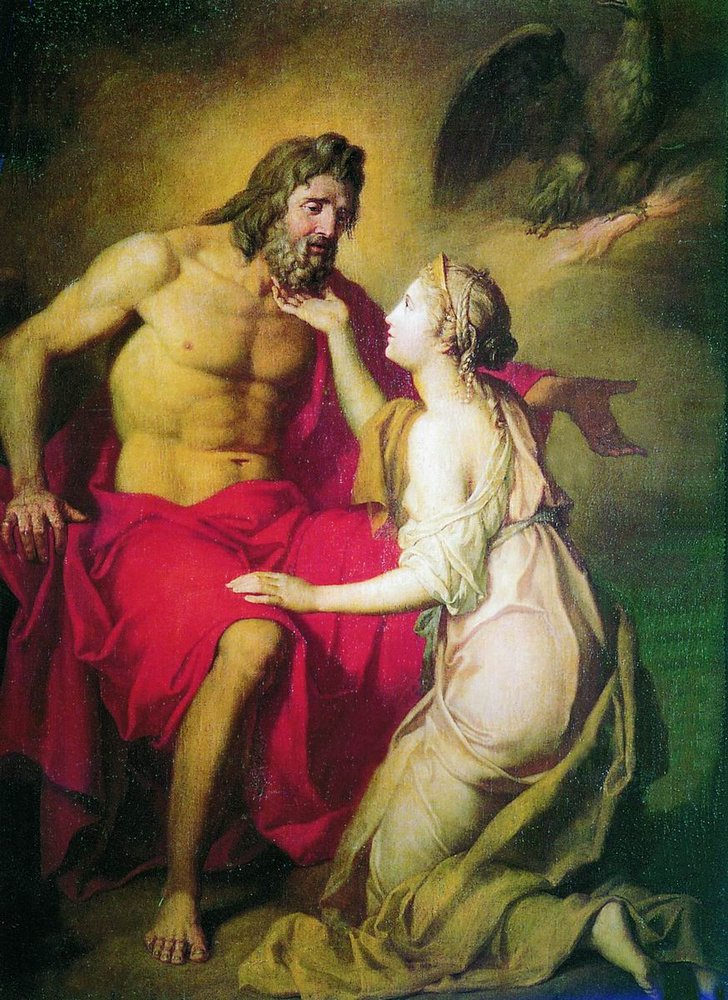

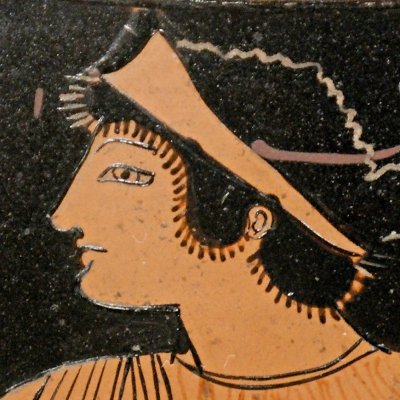
Head of Thetis from an Attic red-figure pelike, c. 510–500 BC, Louvre.

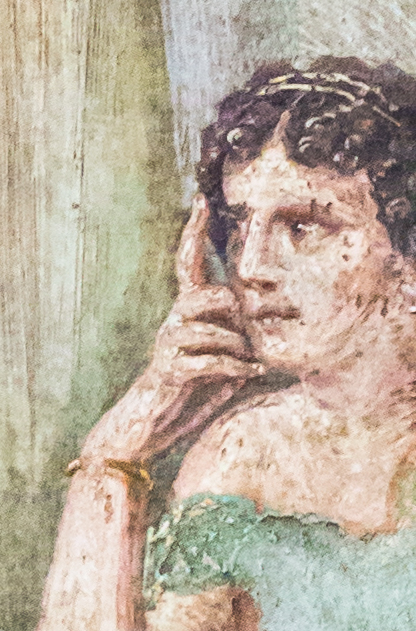
Thetis on an antique fresco in Pompeii, 1st century

=== Wedding of Peleus and Thetis ===
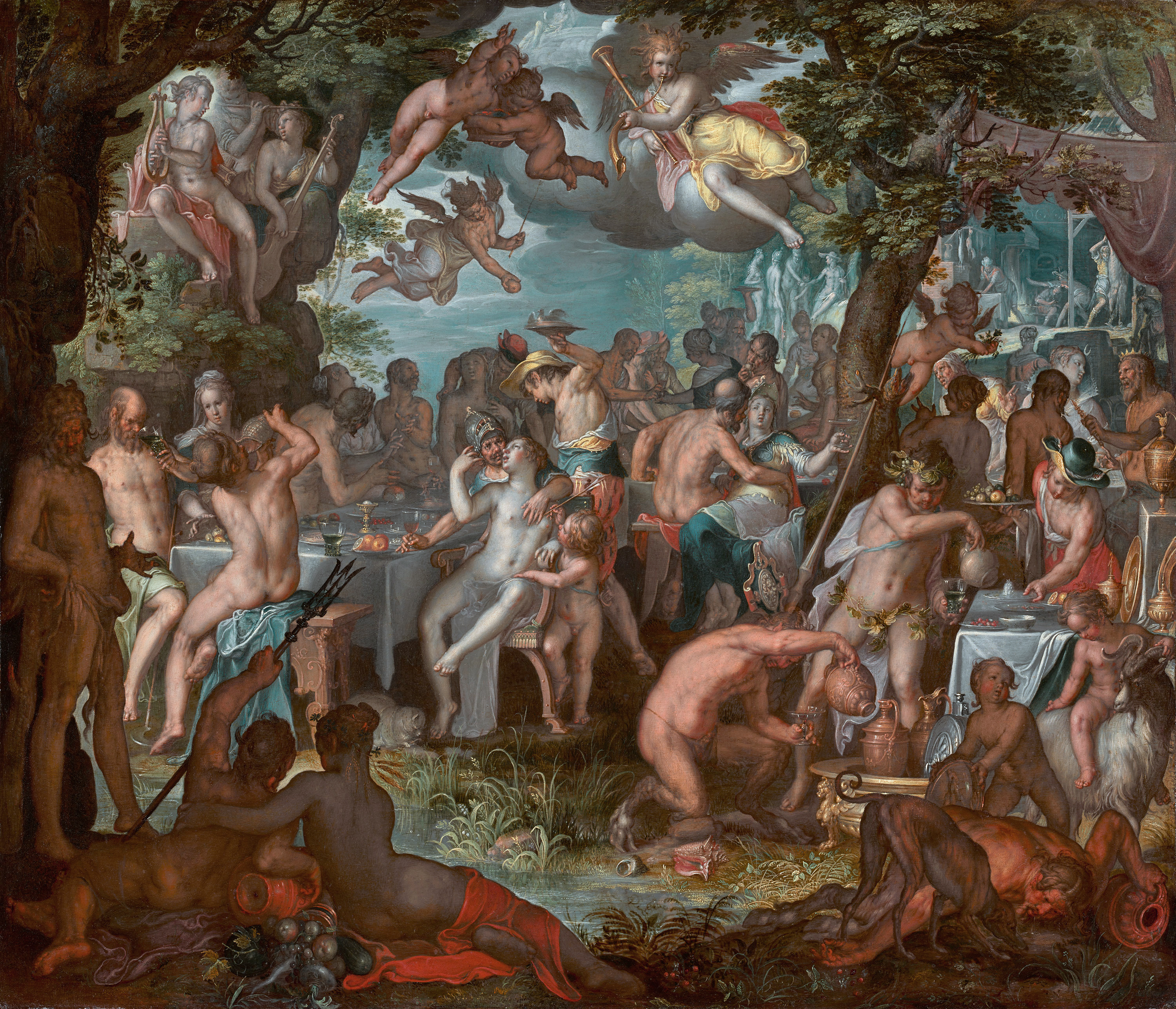

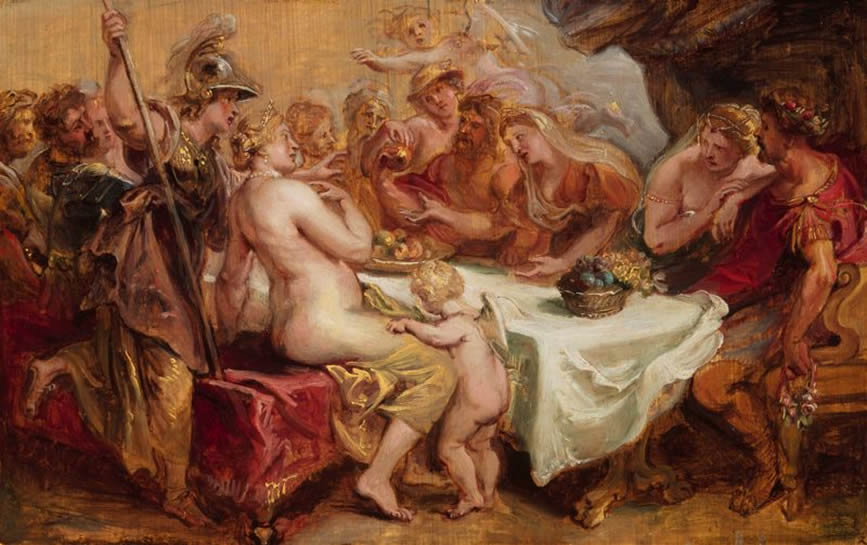

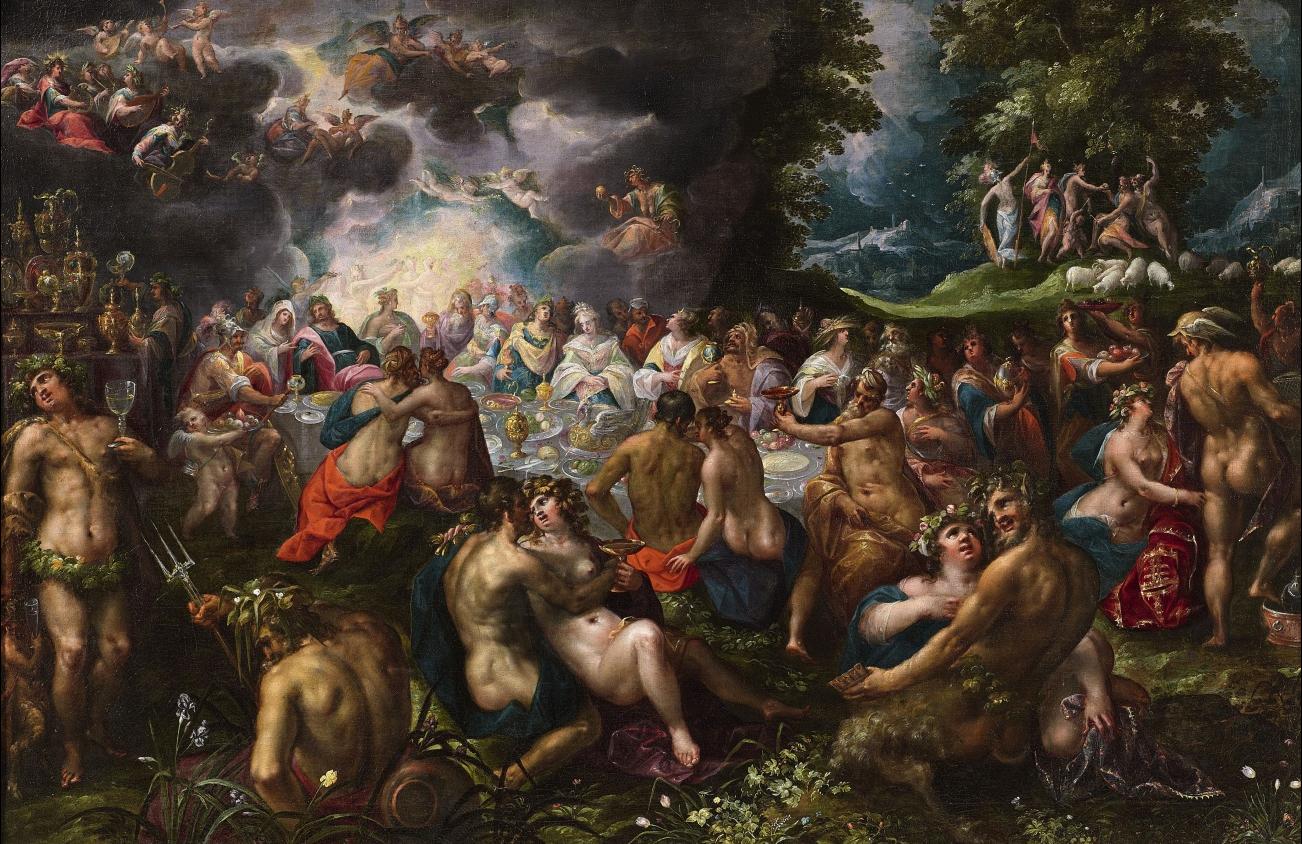

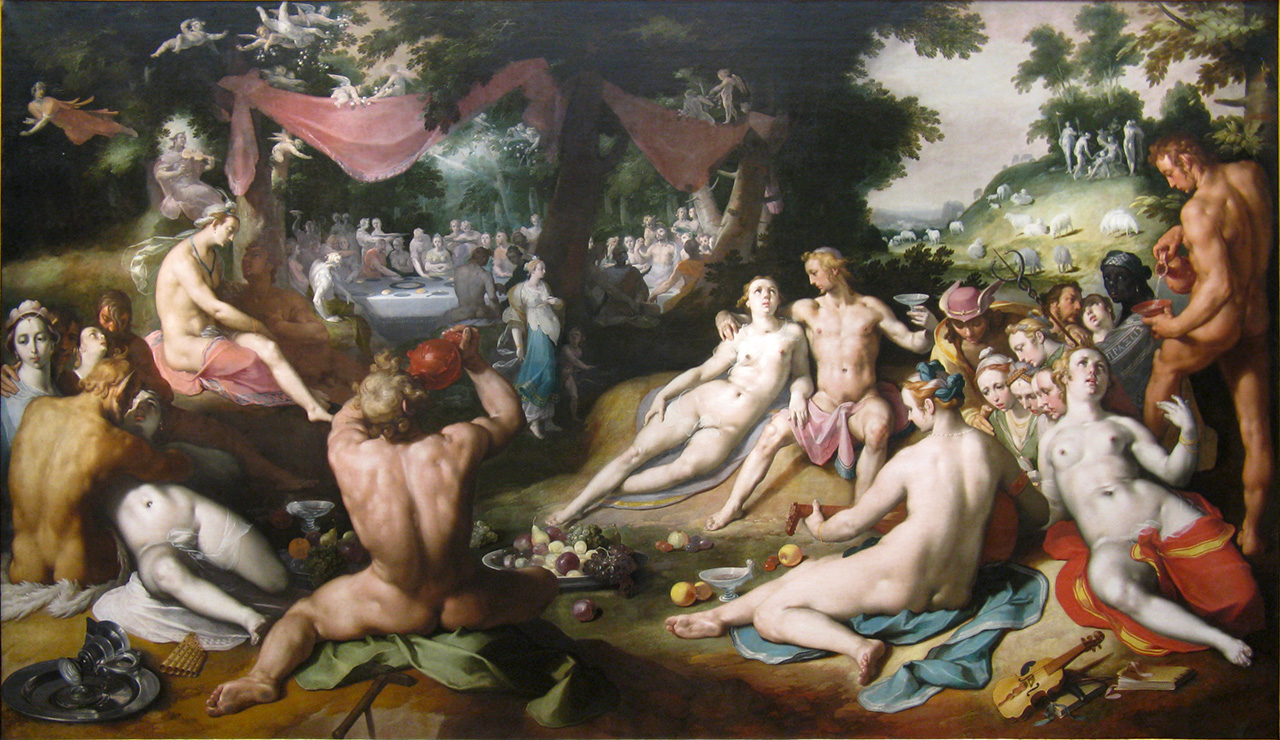

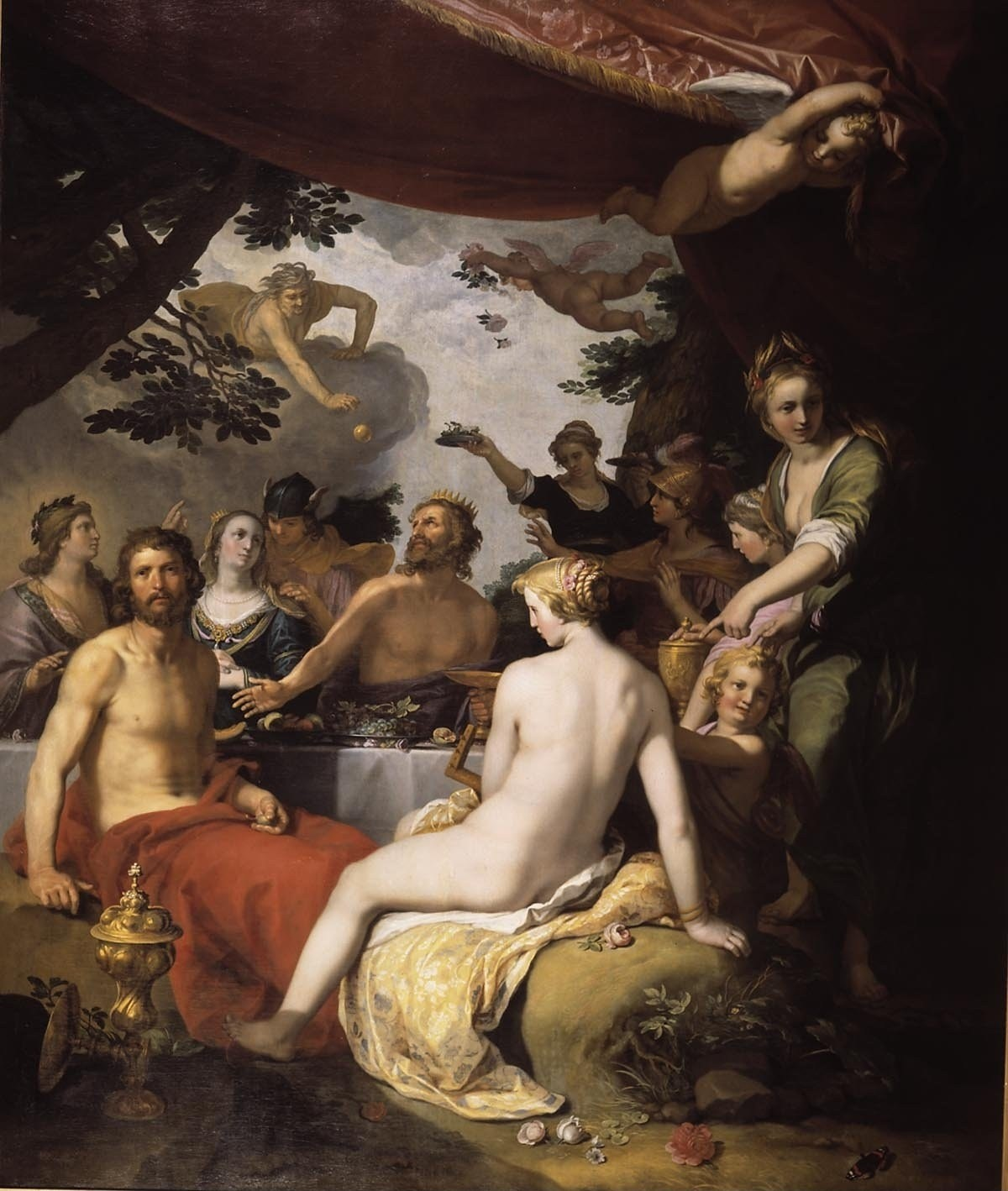

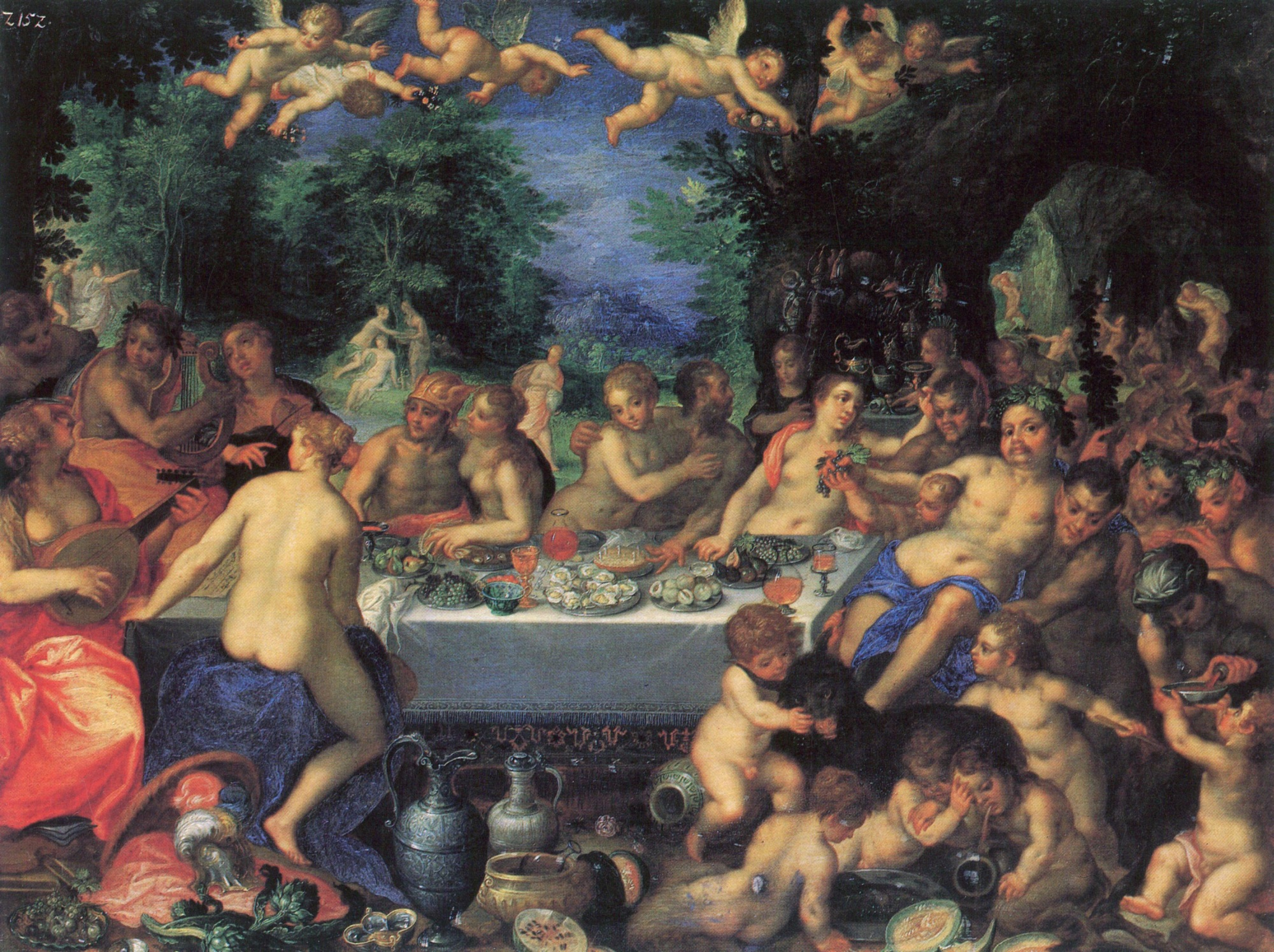

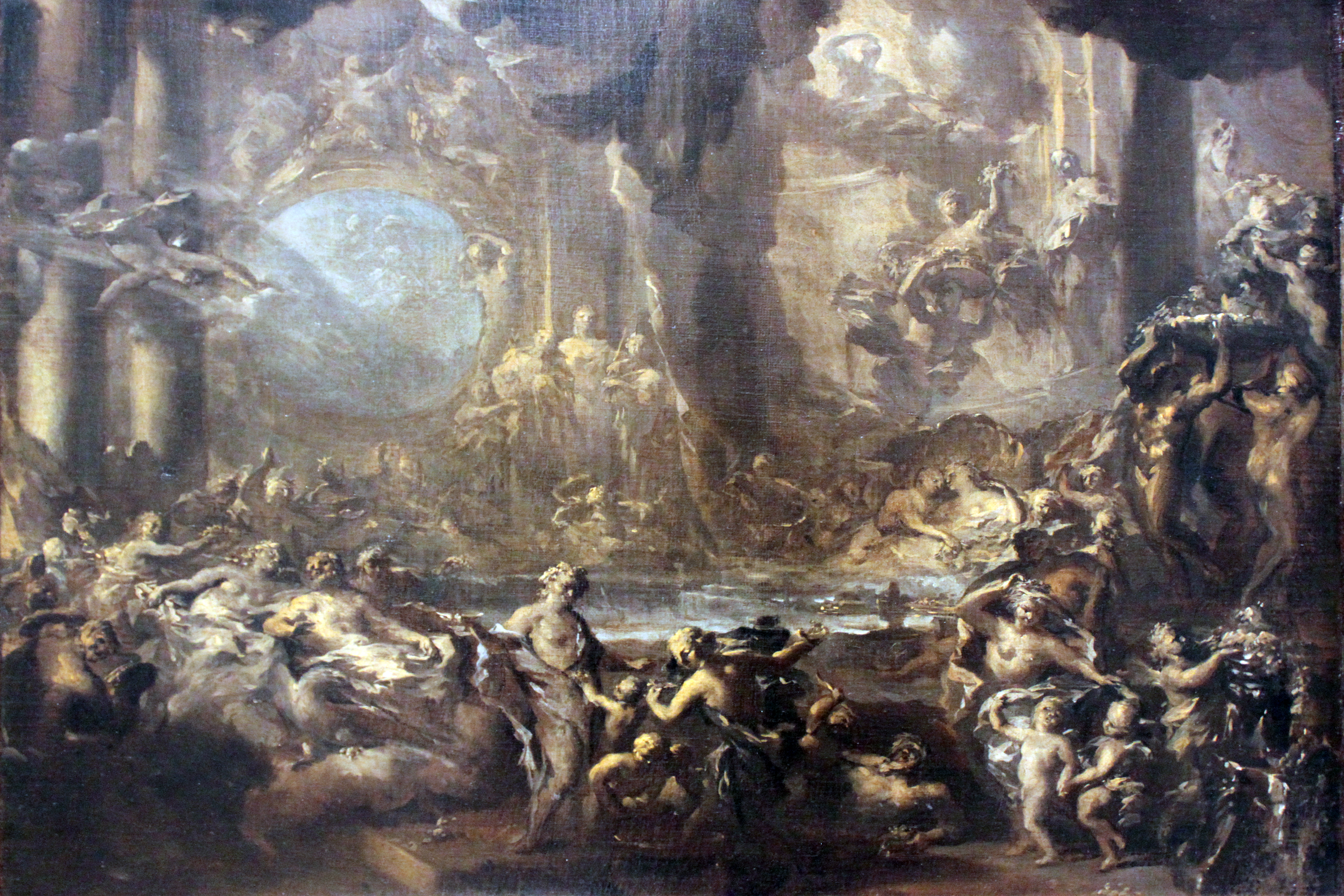

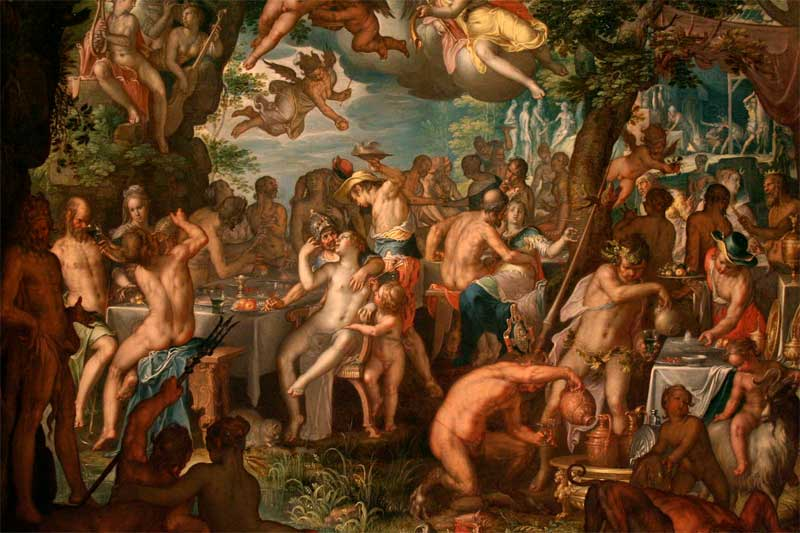

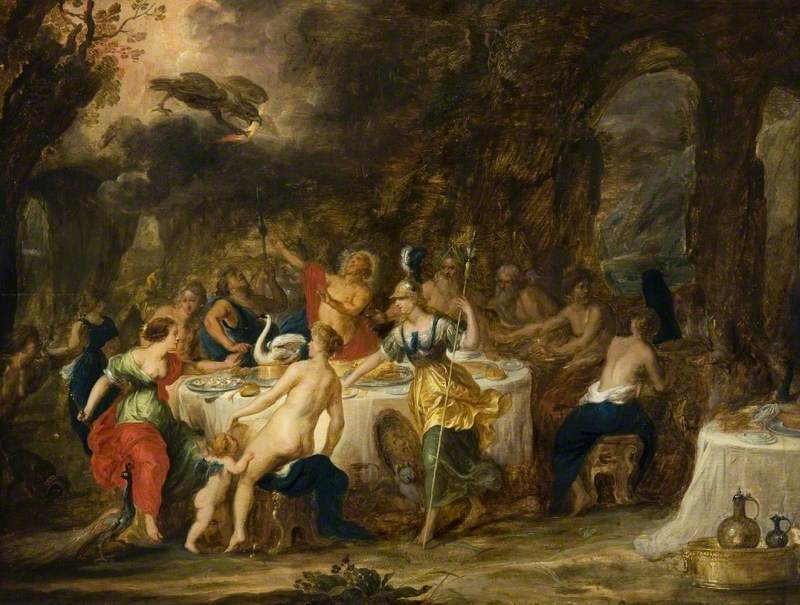

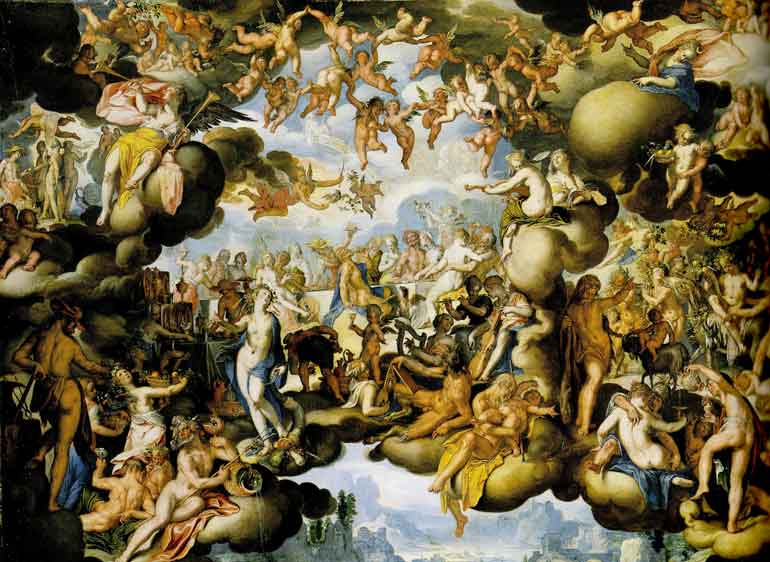

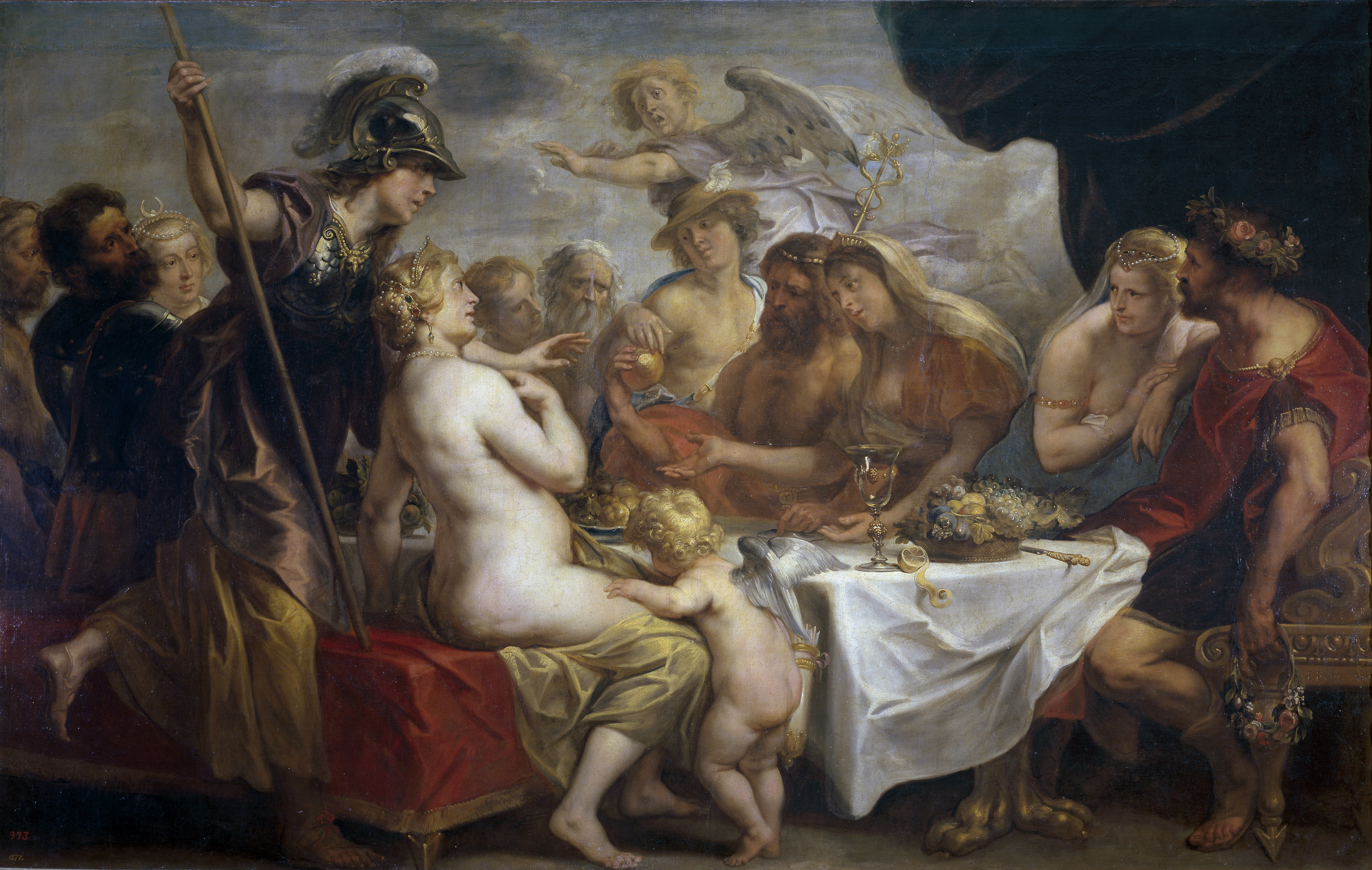

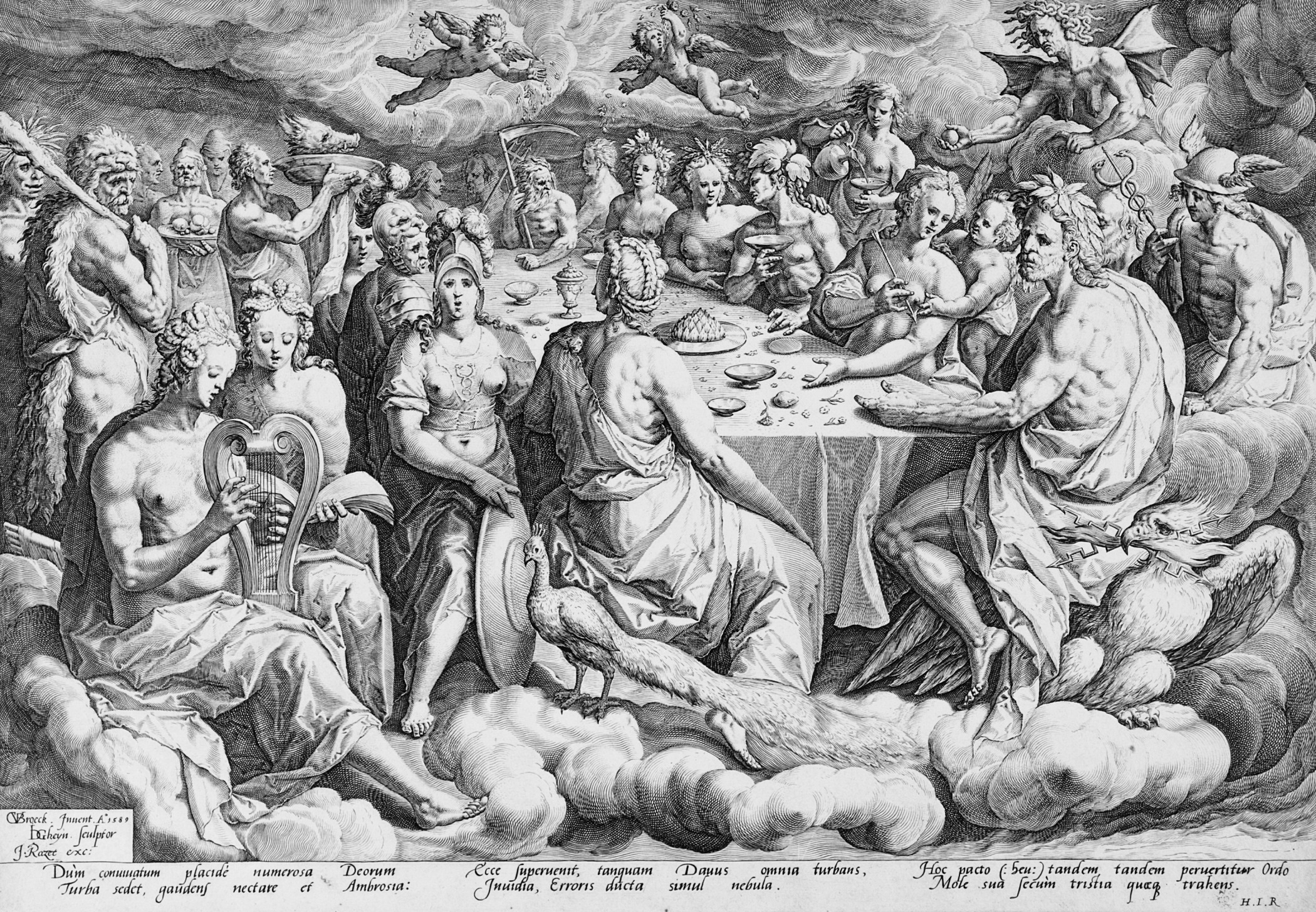

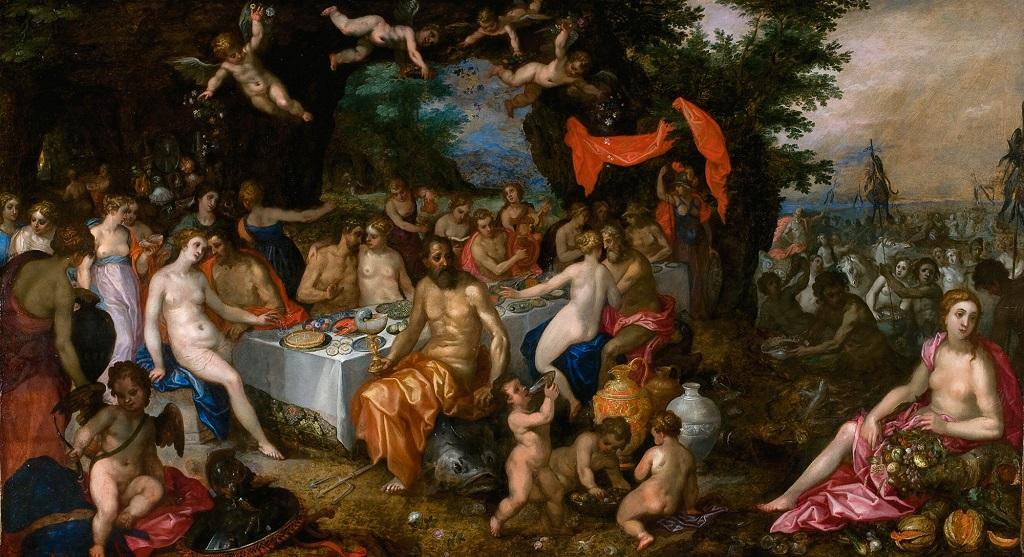

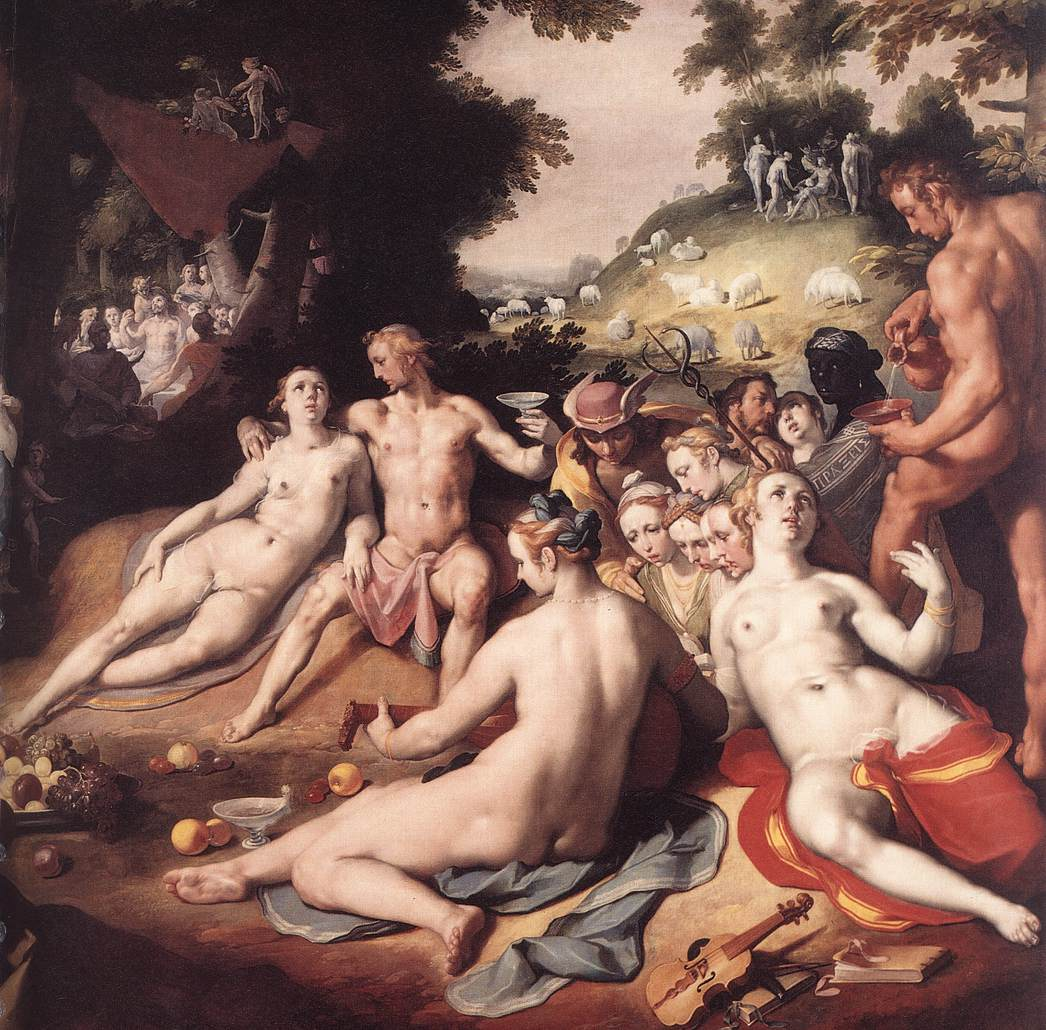

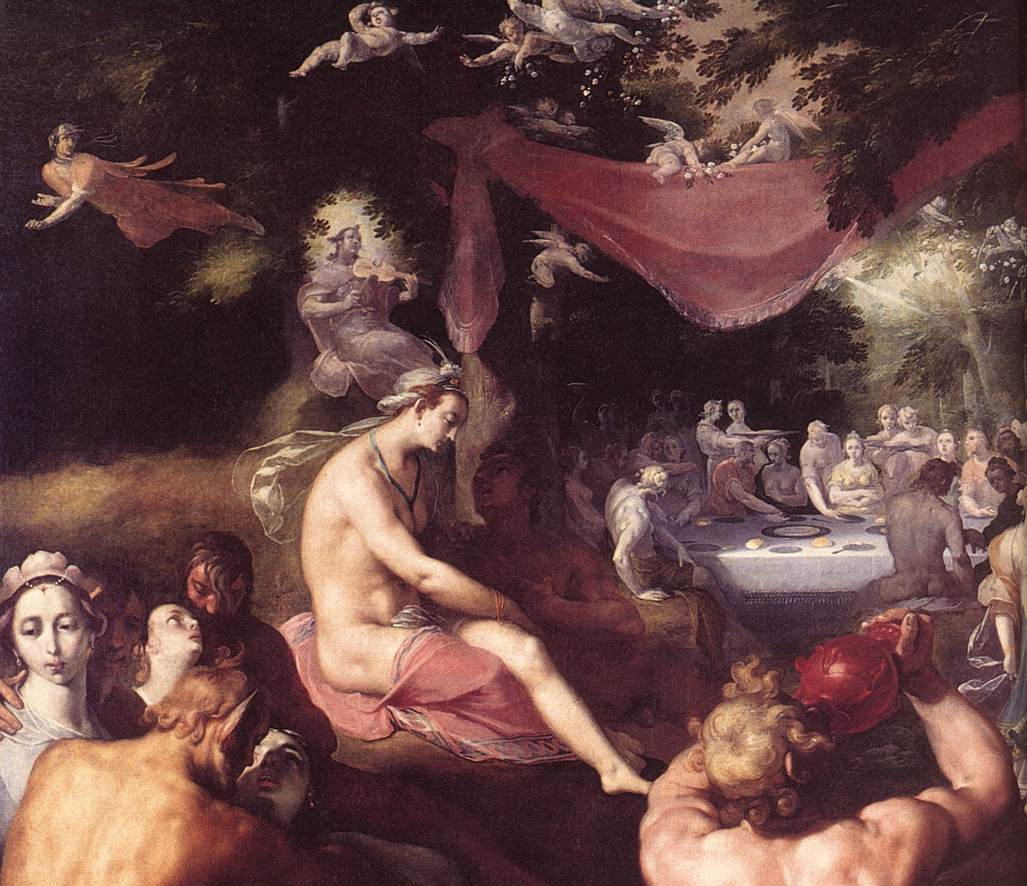

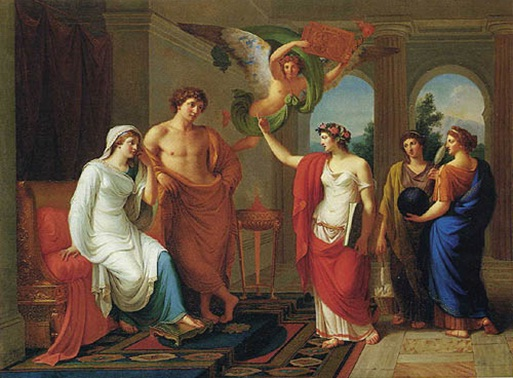

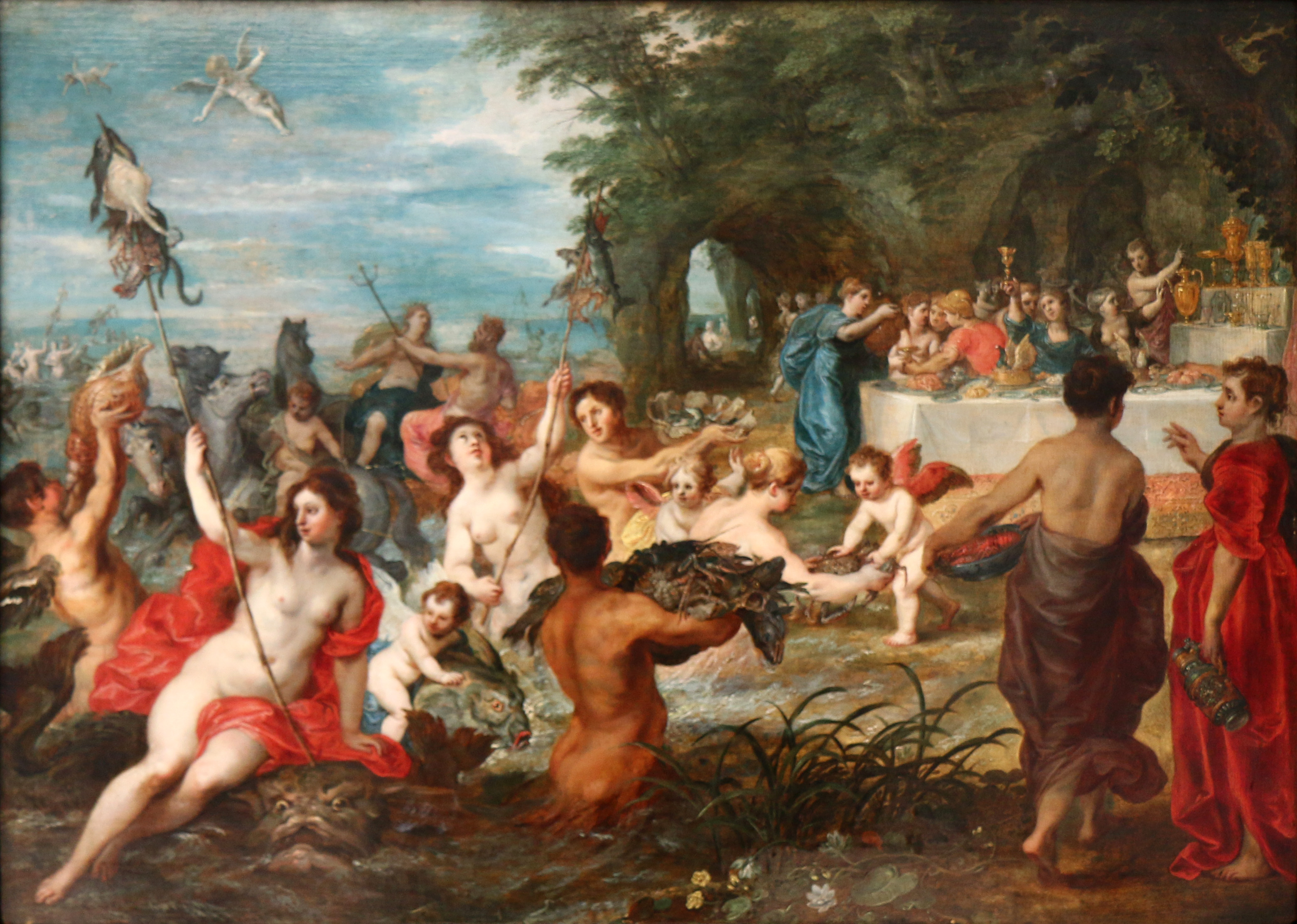

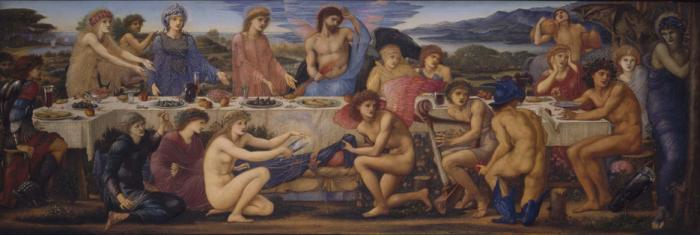

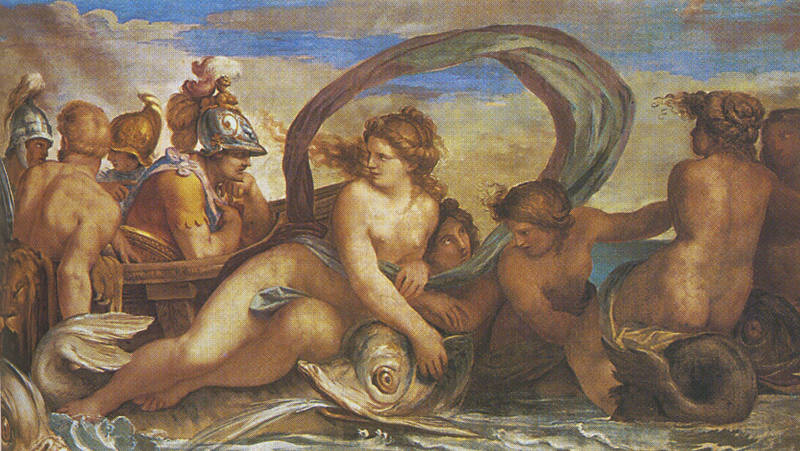

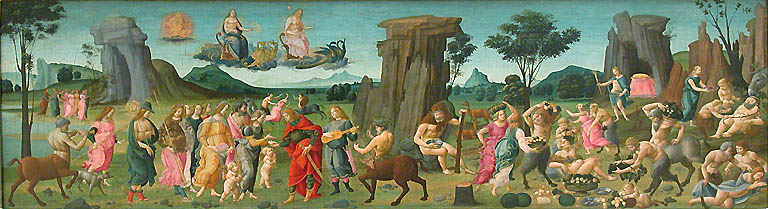

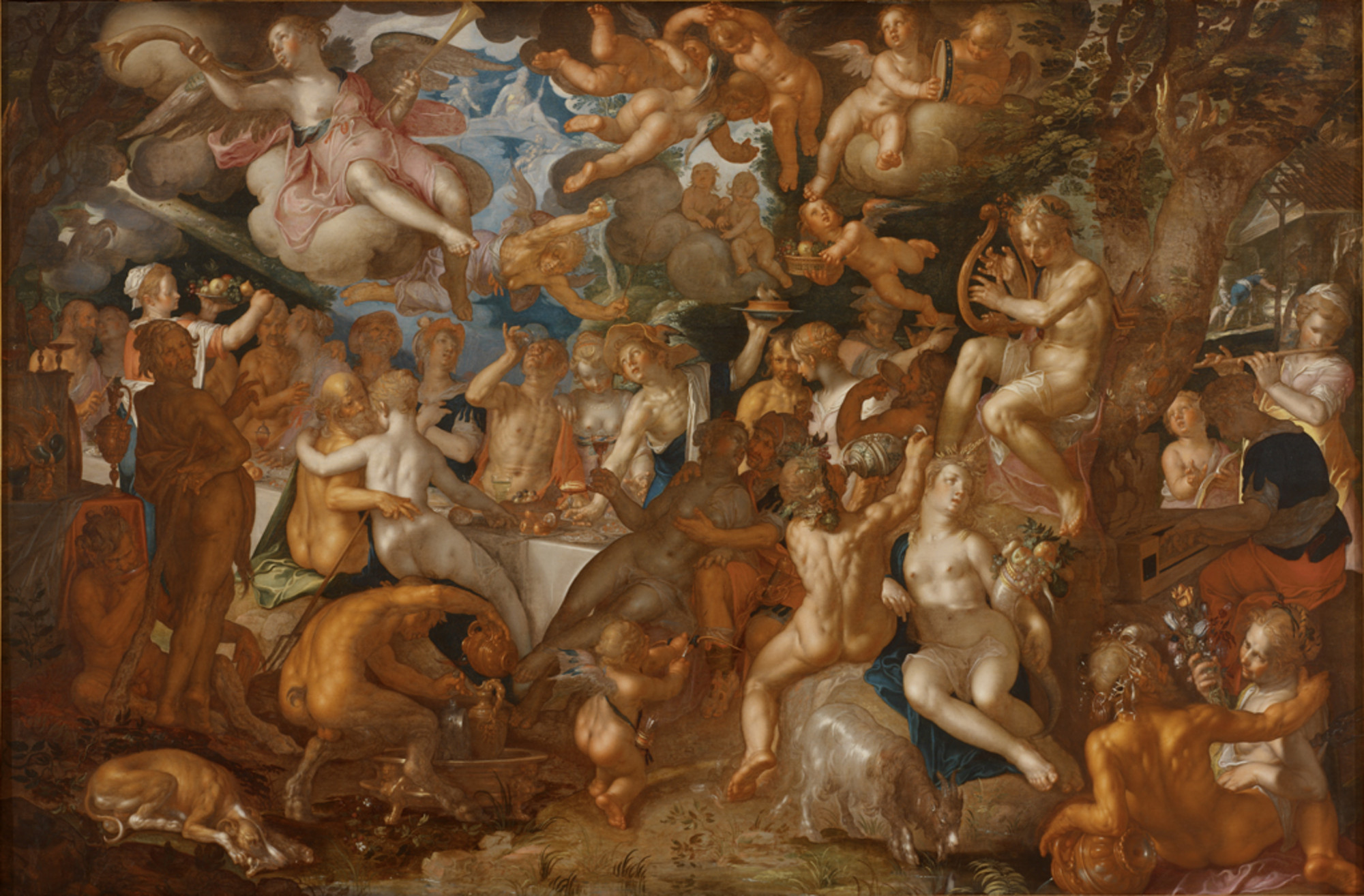

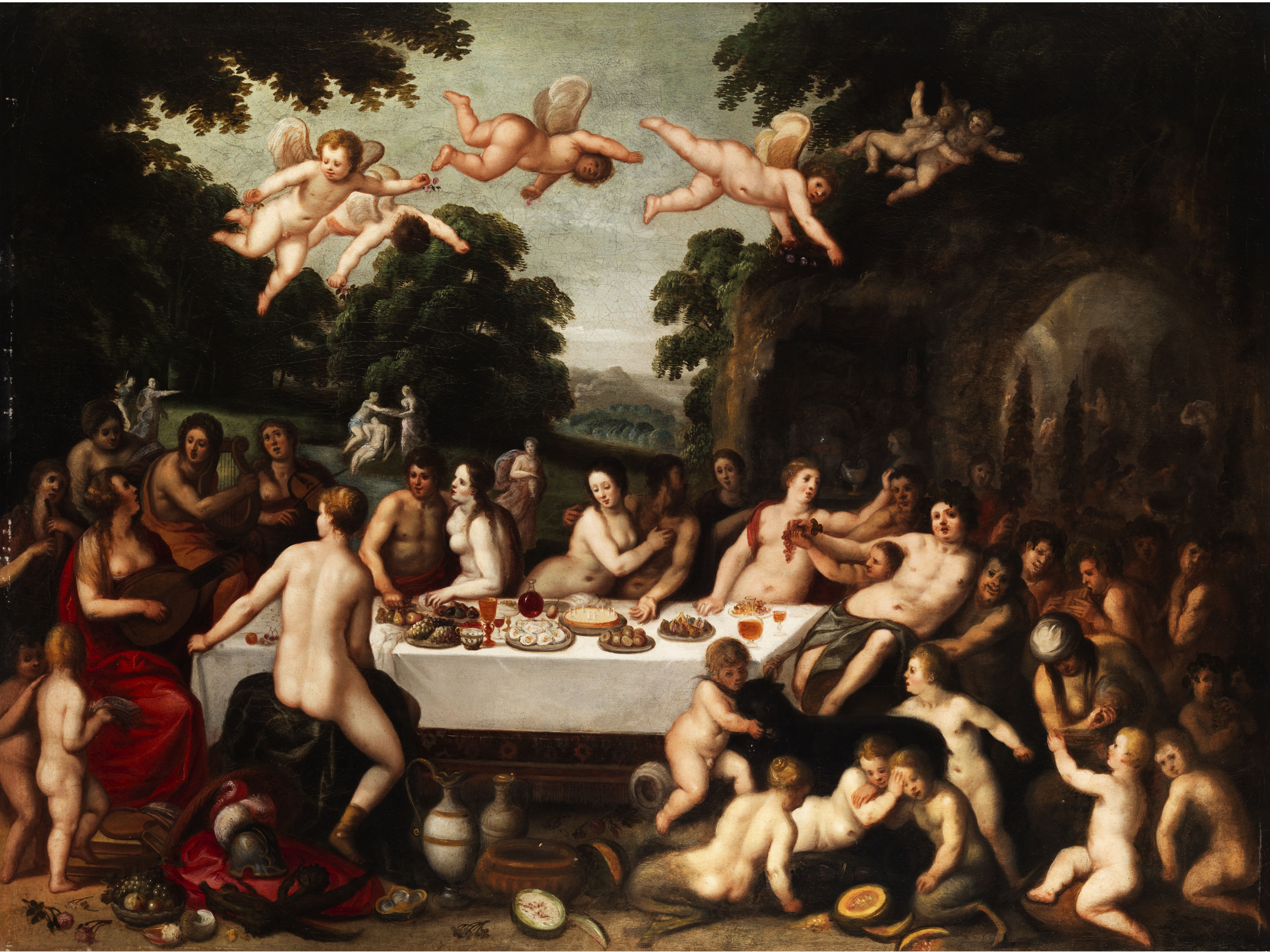

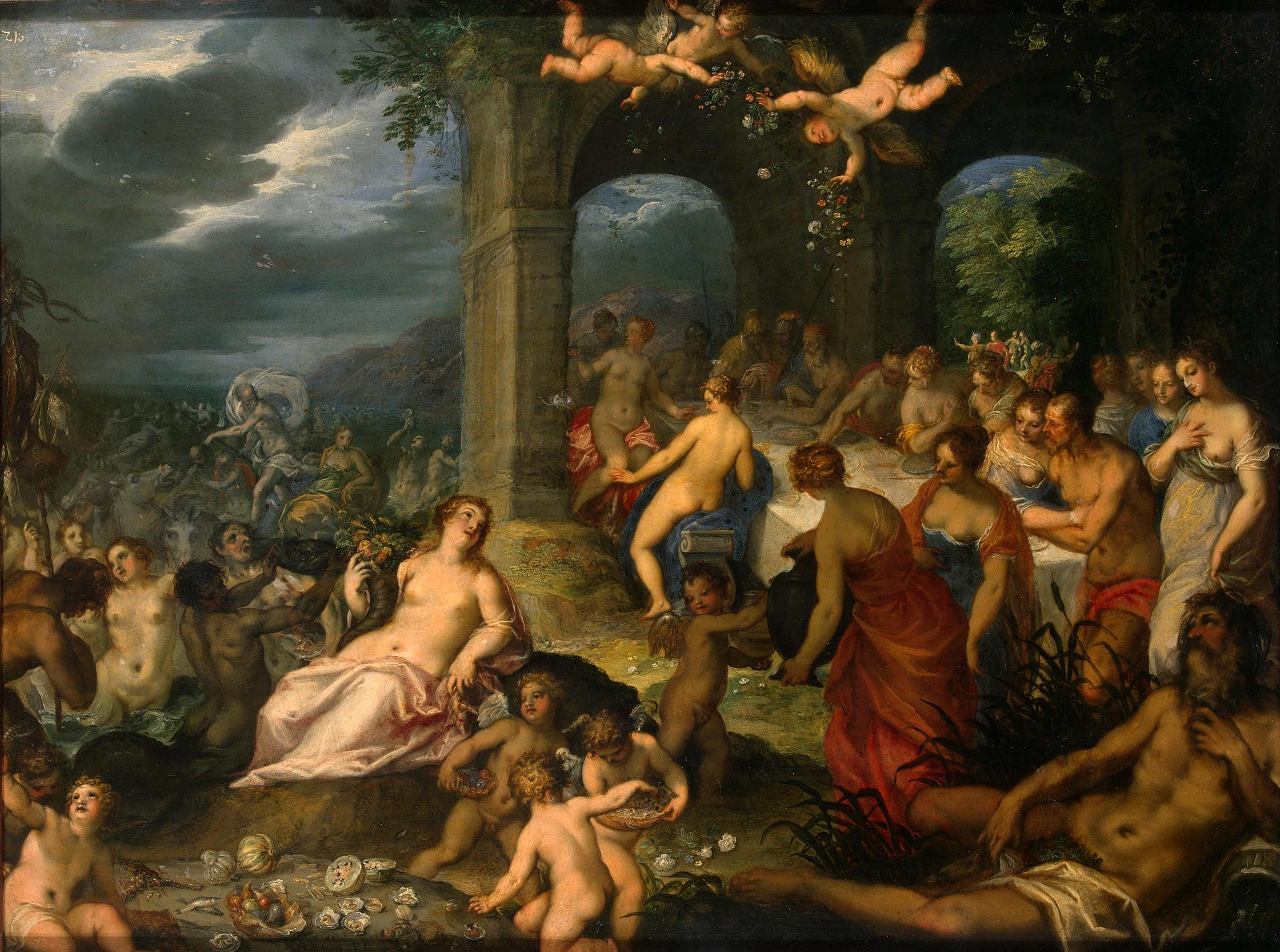

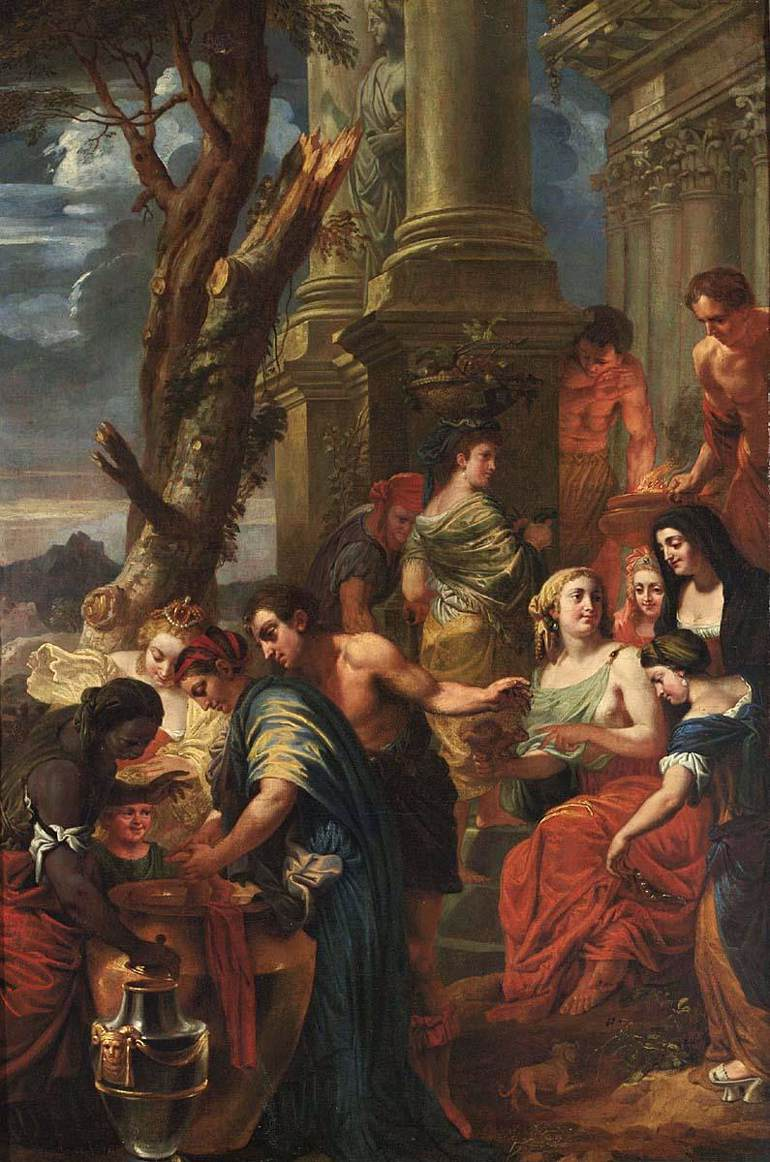

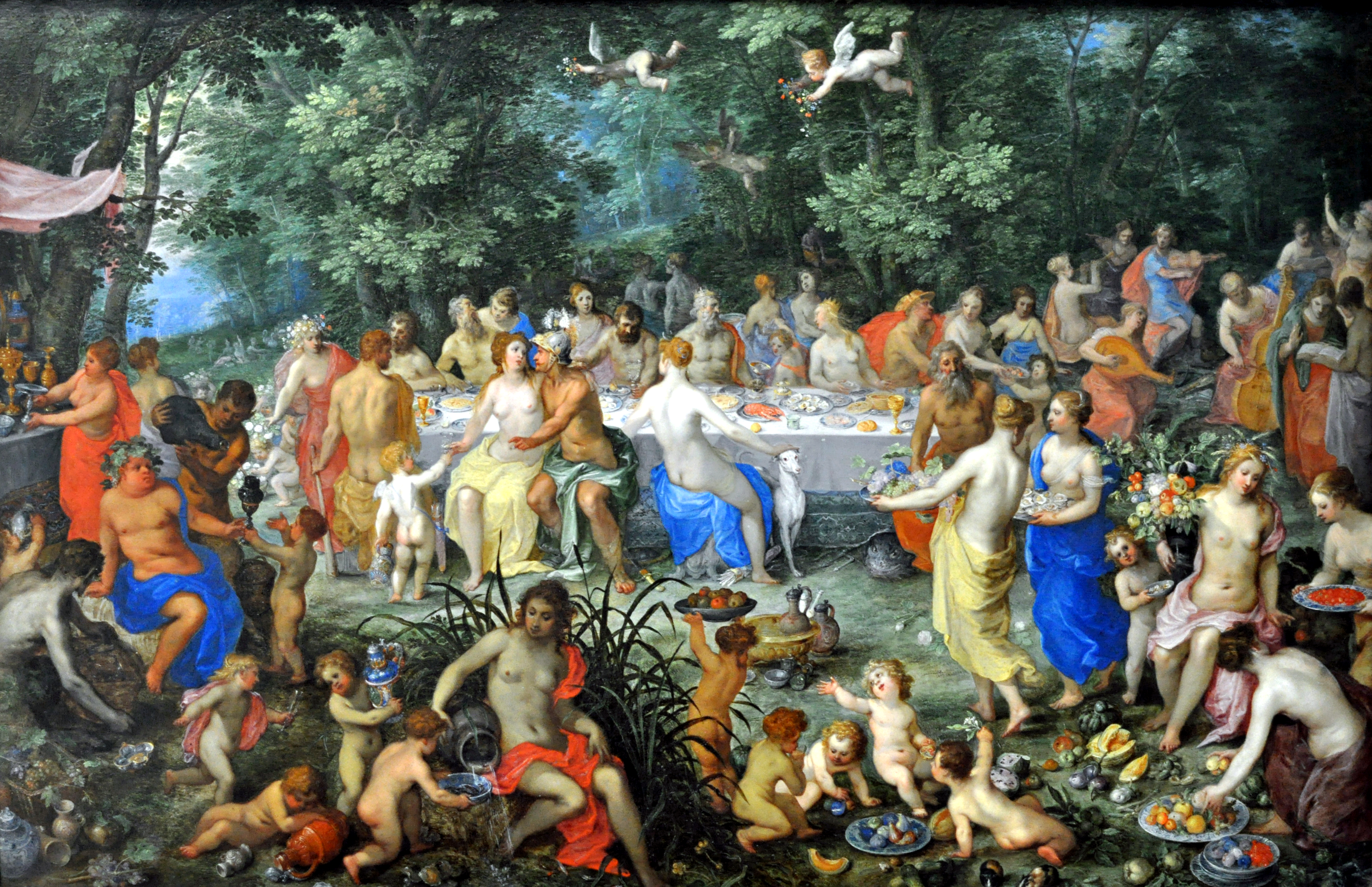

=== Thetis and Achilles ===
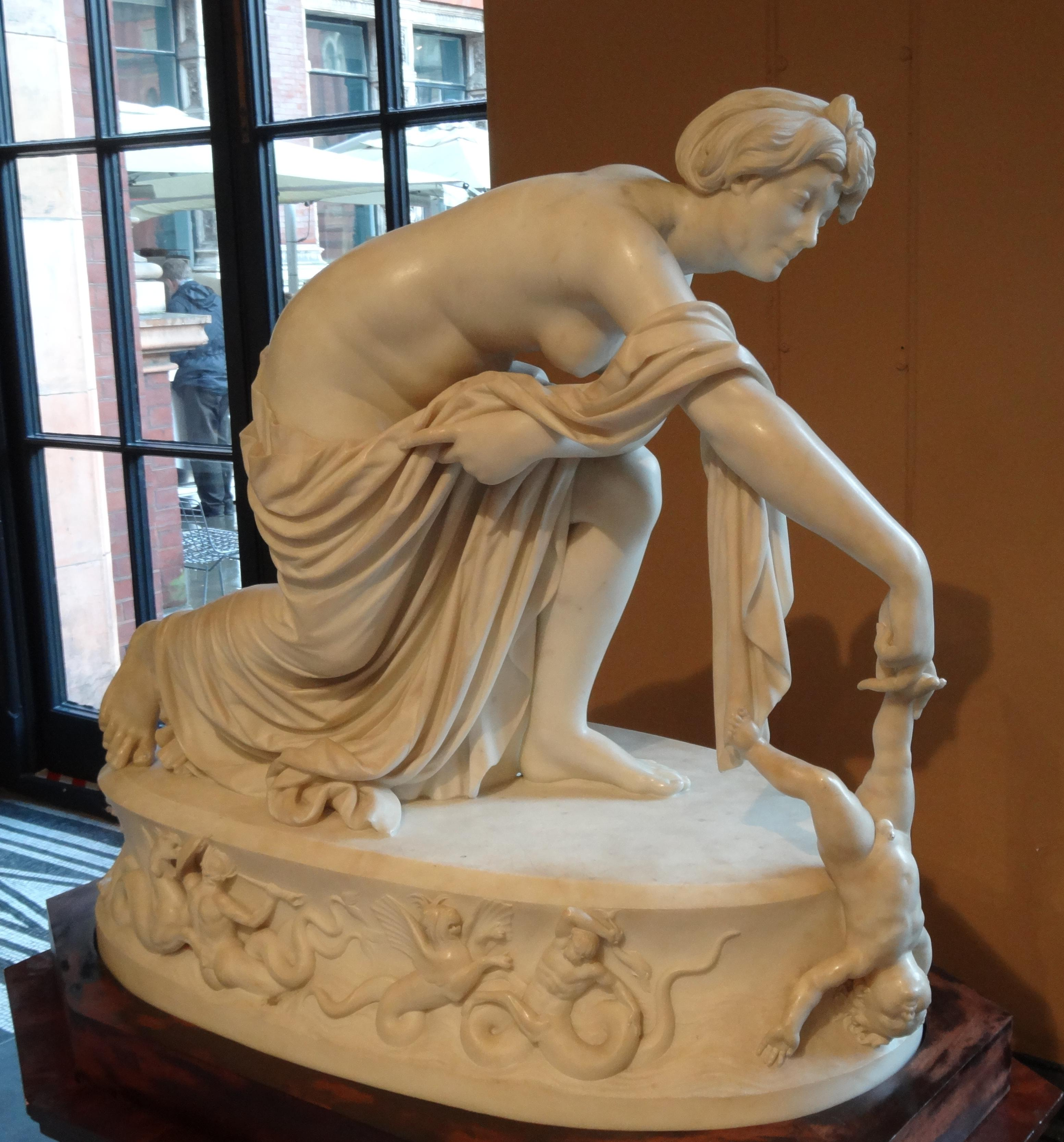

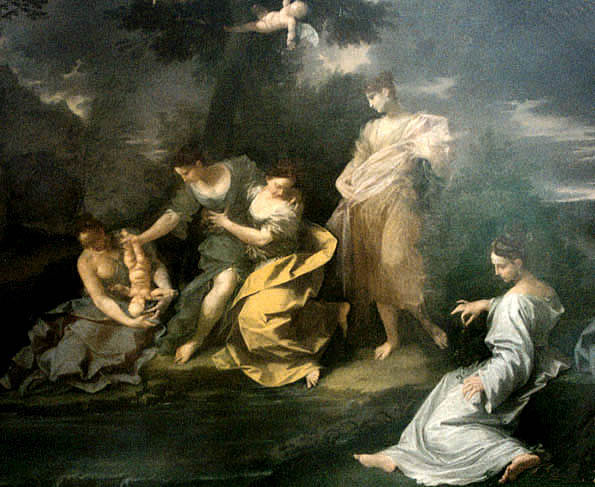

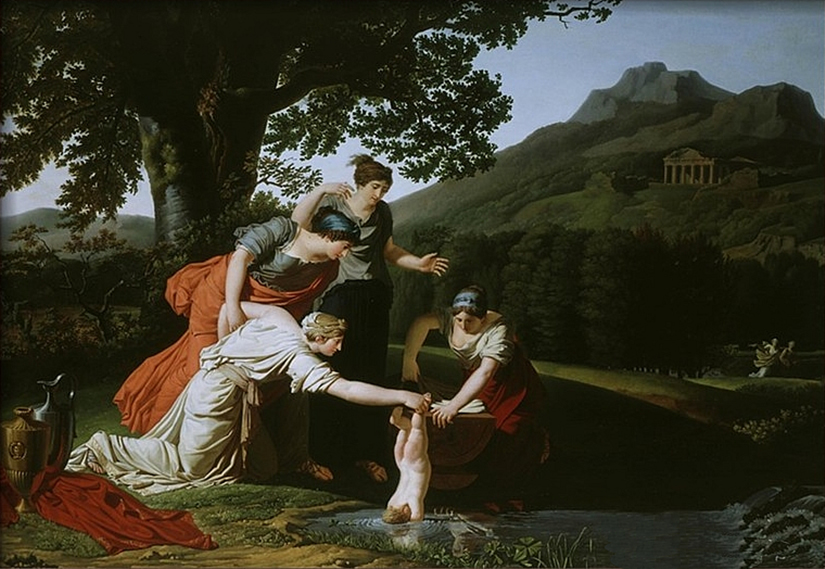

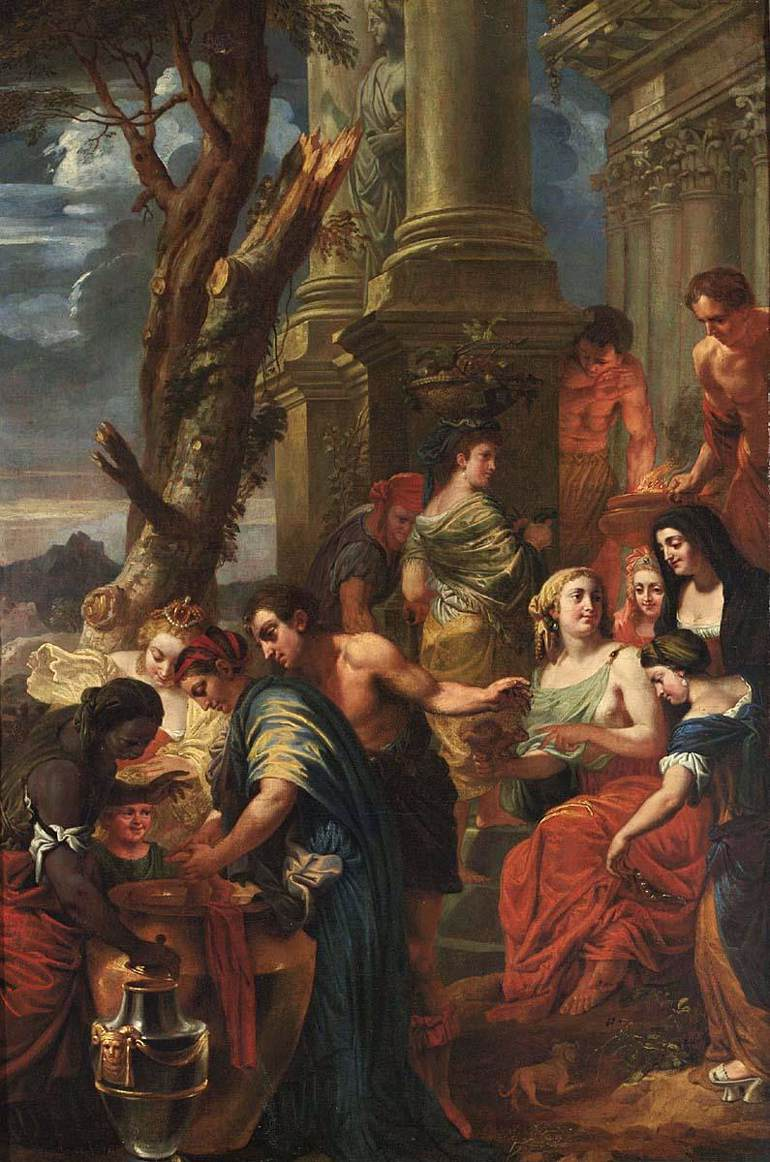

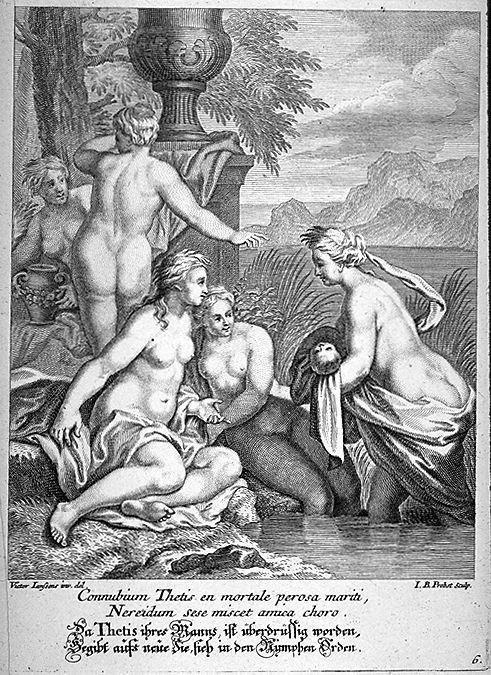

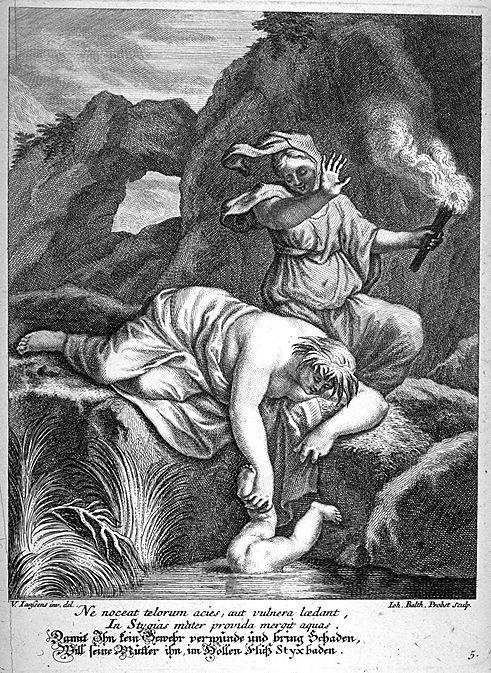

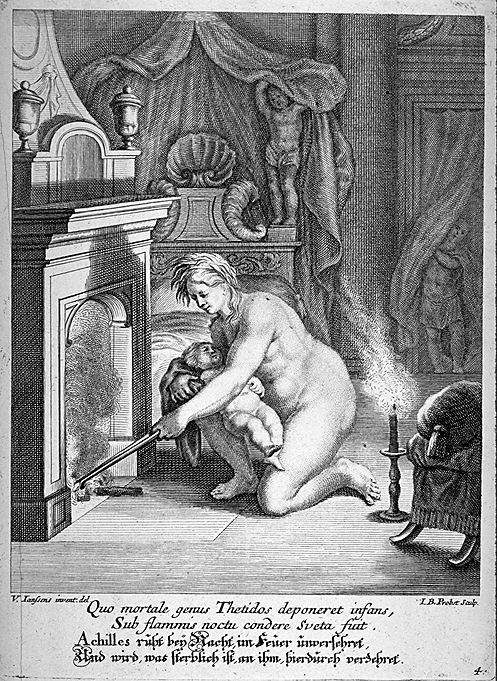

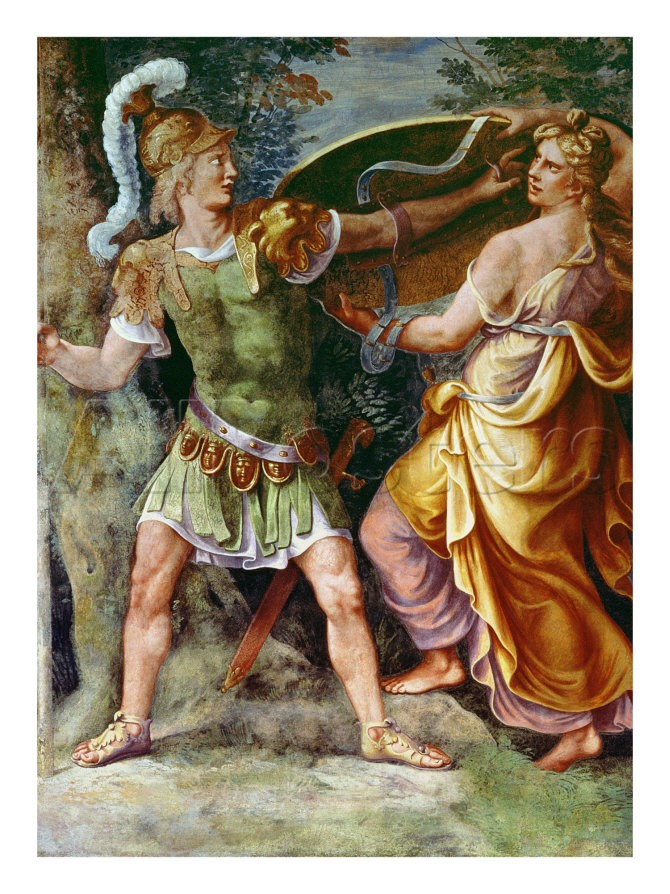

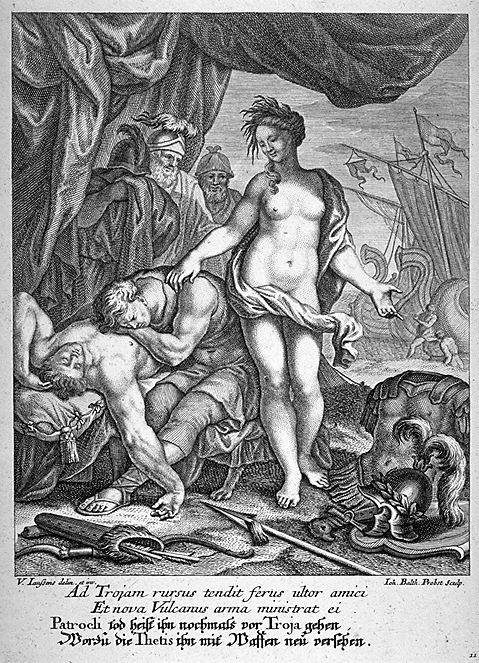

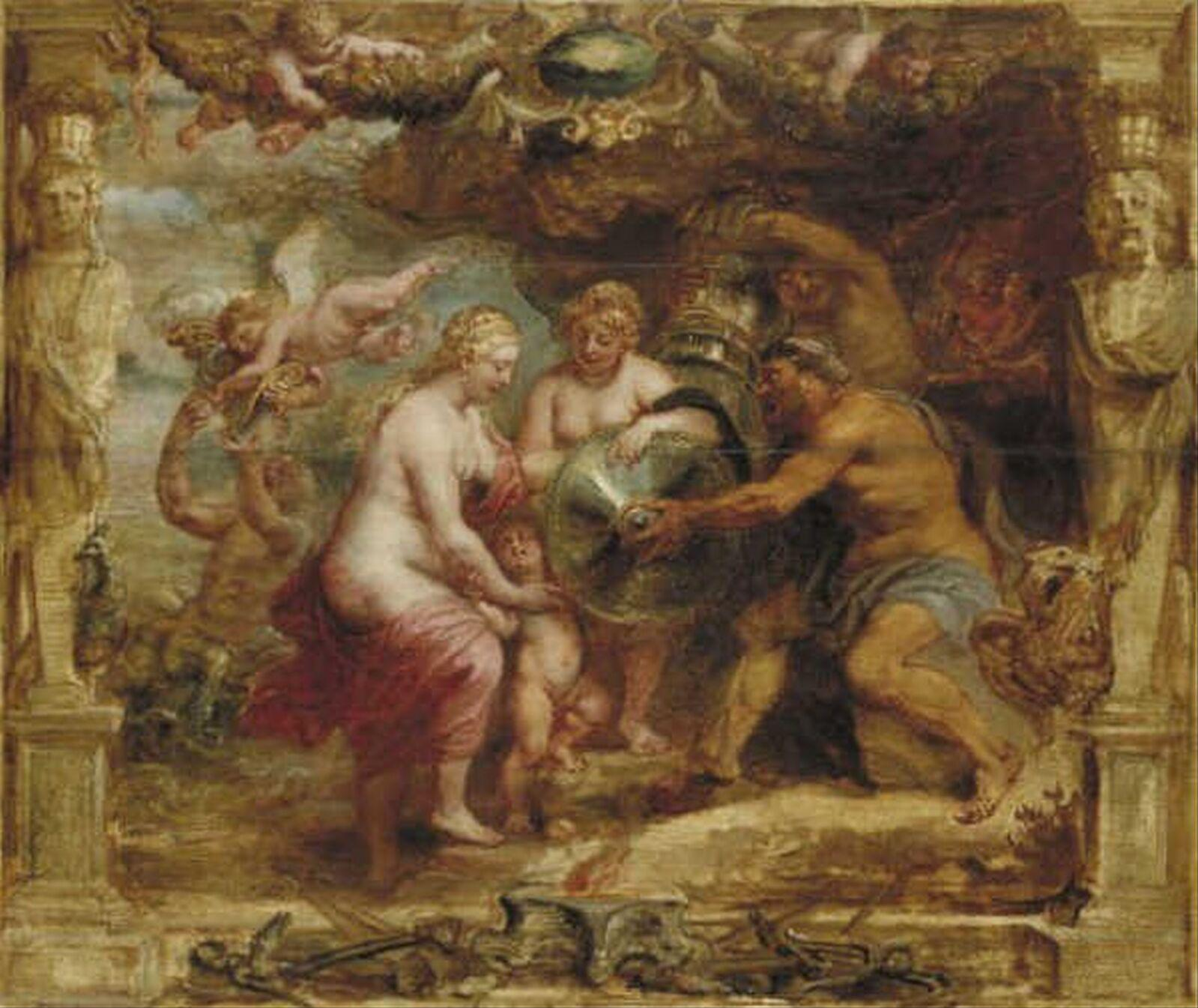

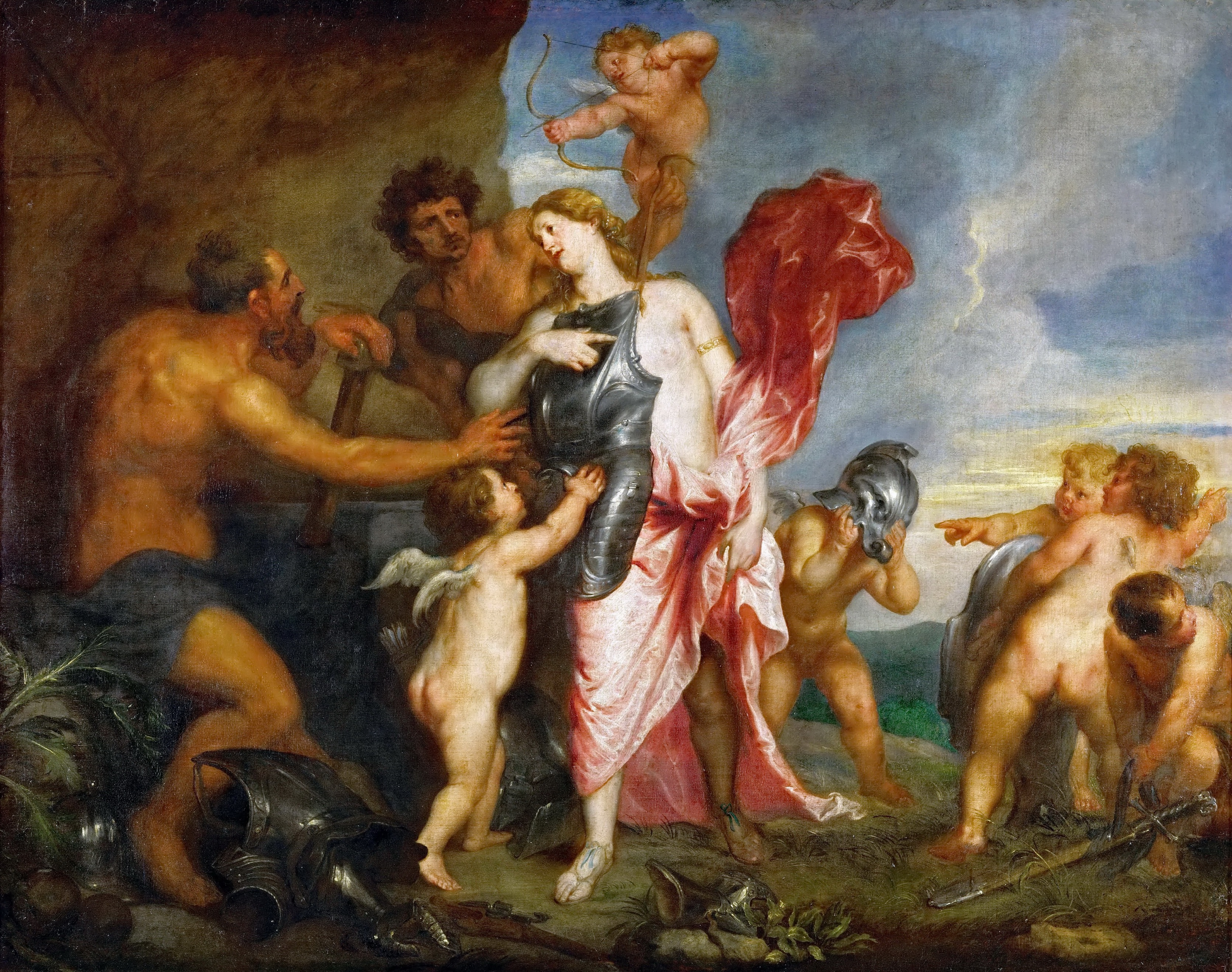

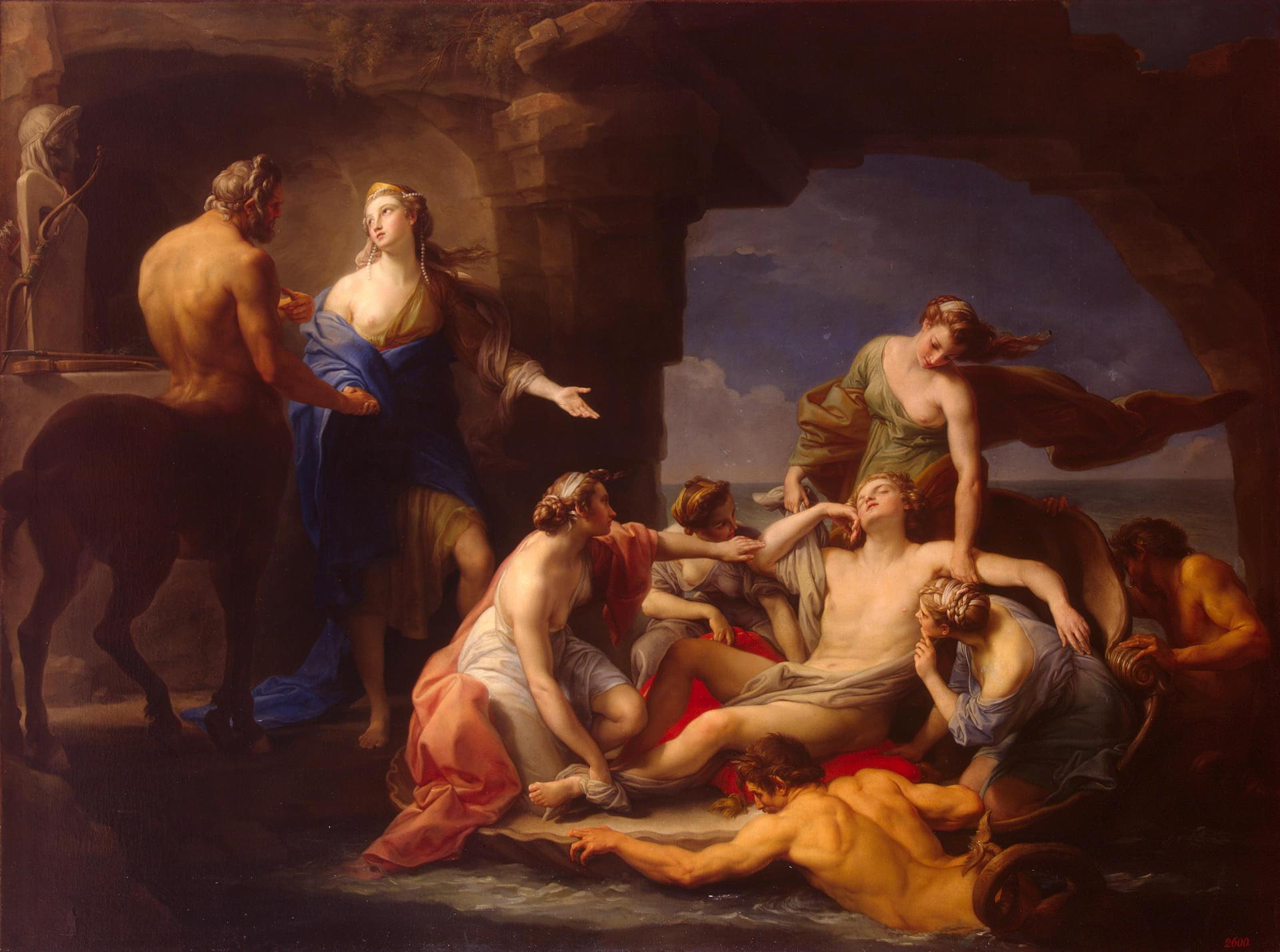

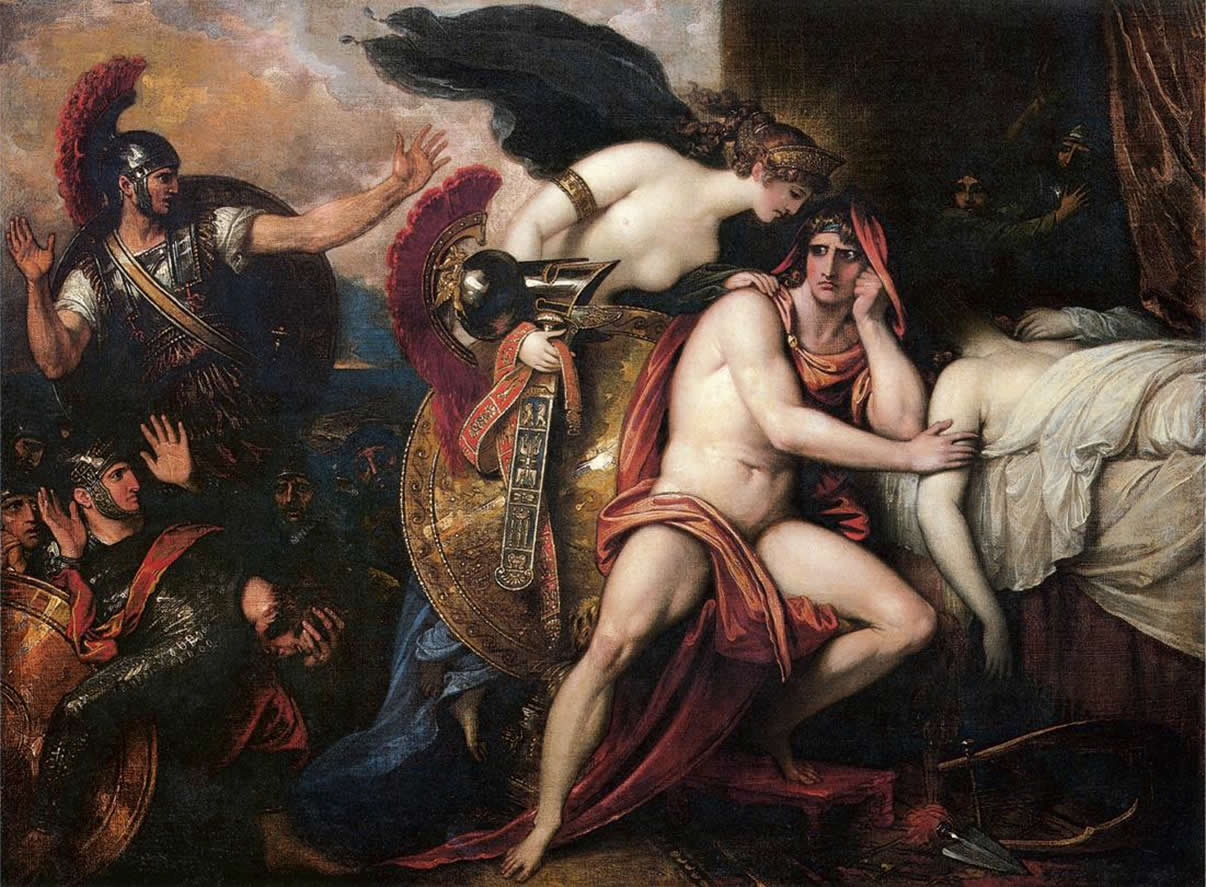

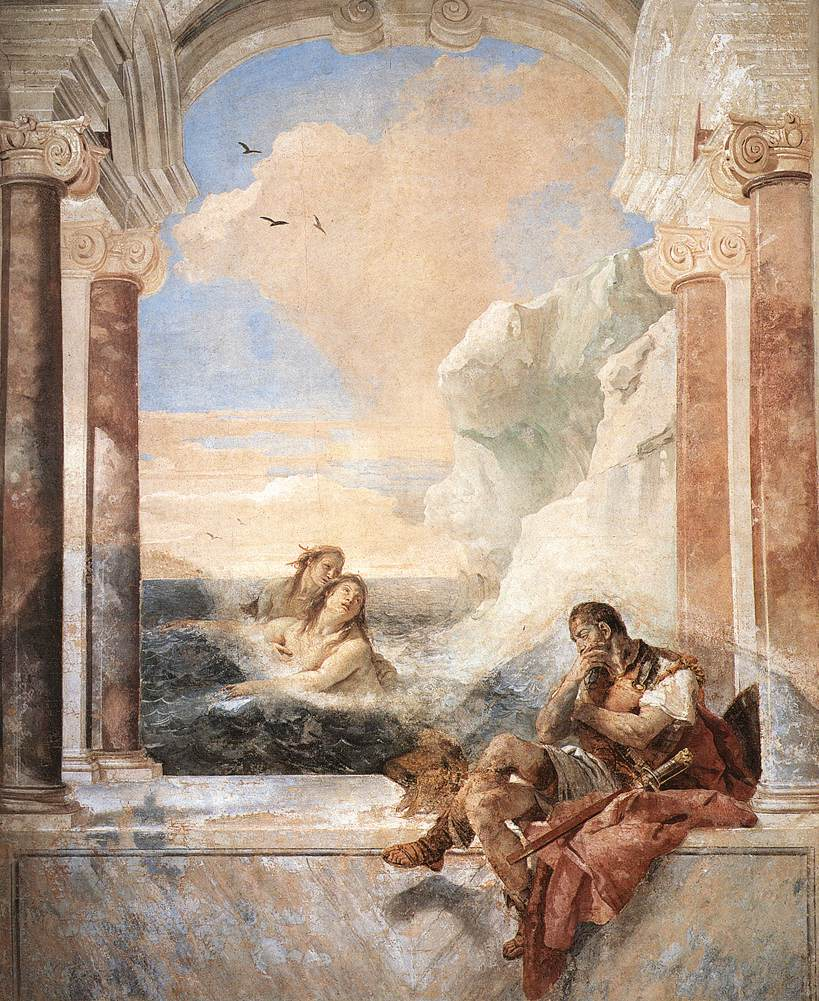

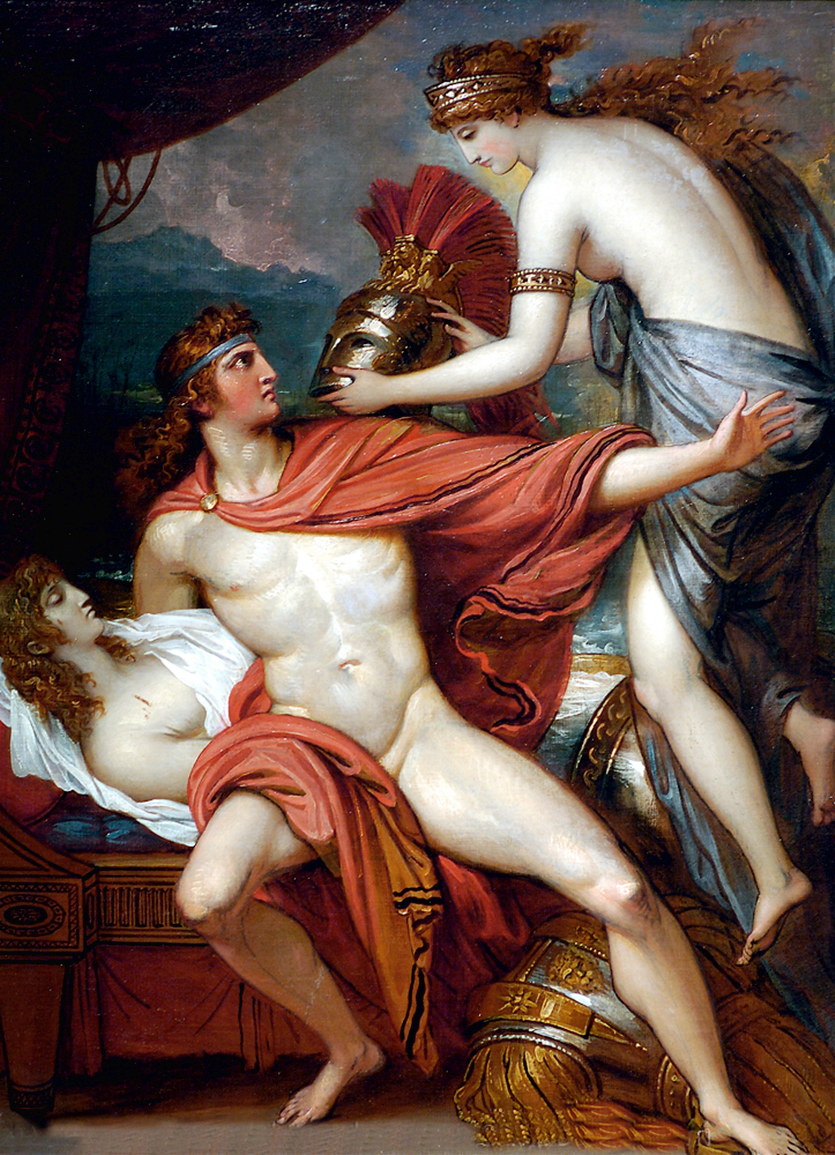

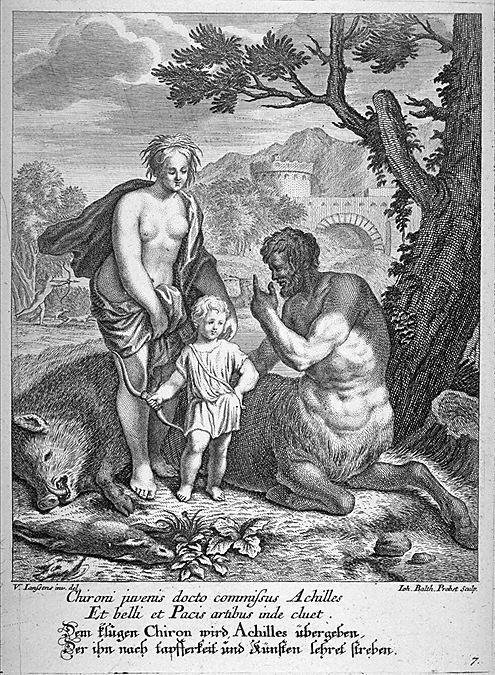
