= Beroe (mythology) =

Set index of characters from Greek mythology

In Greek mythology, Beroe (Ancient Greek: Βερόη, romanized: Beróē, lit. 'of Beirut') may refer to the following divinities and women:

- Beroe, one of the 3,000 Oceanids, water nymph daughters of the Titans Oceanus and Tethys. She was counted in the train of Cyrene together with her sister Clio. Nonnus identifies her with the city of Beirut, and makes it the place where Aphrodite first stepped ashore.
- Beroe, also called Amymone daughter of Aphrodite and Adonis and bride of Poseidon. Also identified by Nonnus with Beirut. Not to be confused with Amymone the Danaid, who is a separate figure.
- Beroe, one of the 50 Nereids, sea-nymph daughters of the 'Old Man of the Sea' Nereus and the Oceanid Doris.
- Beroe, nurse of Semele, whose shape Hera took in order to destroy the Theban princess. According to Ovid the goddess expresses doubt that Semele's lover really is Zeus, and suggests she ask for proof of his identity – namely, that she should ask him to appear to her as he does to Hera. In the Fabulae of Hyginus the disguised goddess tells Semele to ask Zeus to come to her as he comes to Hera, so that she would know what pleasure it is to sleep with a god. At her suggestion Semele made this request to Zeus, and was smitten by a thunderbolt.
- Beroe, wife of Doryclus, was an old lady among the Trojan women who followed Aeneas to exile in Virgil's Aeneid. Whilst she is somewhere else, Iris takes on her shape persuades the other women to burn the ships when they are Italy.
