= Pontomedusa =

Nereid in Greek mythology

In Greek mythology, Pontomedusa or Pontomedousa (Ancient Greek: Ποντομέδουσα, romanized: Pontomédousa, lit. 'sea-queen') was one of the fifty Nereids, marine-nymph daughters of the 'Old Man of the Sea' Nereus and the Oceanid Doris.
