= Eione =

In Greek mythology, Eione (Ancient Greek: Ἠιόνη, romanized: Ēïōnē, lit. 'shore', 'beach strand' or 'the shore goddess') was the Nereid of beach sand. She was one of the 50 sea-nymph daughters of the 'Old Man of the Sea' Nereus and the Oceanid Doris.
