= Ploto =

In Greek mythology, Ploto (Ancient Greek: Πλωτώ Plôtô means 'the swimmer') was one of the 50 Nereids, marine-nymph daughters of the 'Old Man of the Sea' Nereus and the Oceanid Doris.
