= Leucothoe (mythology) =

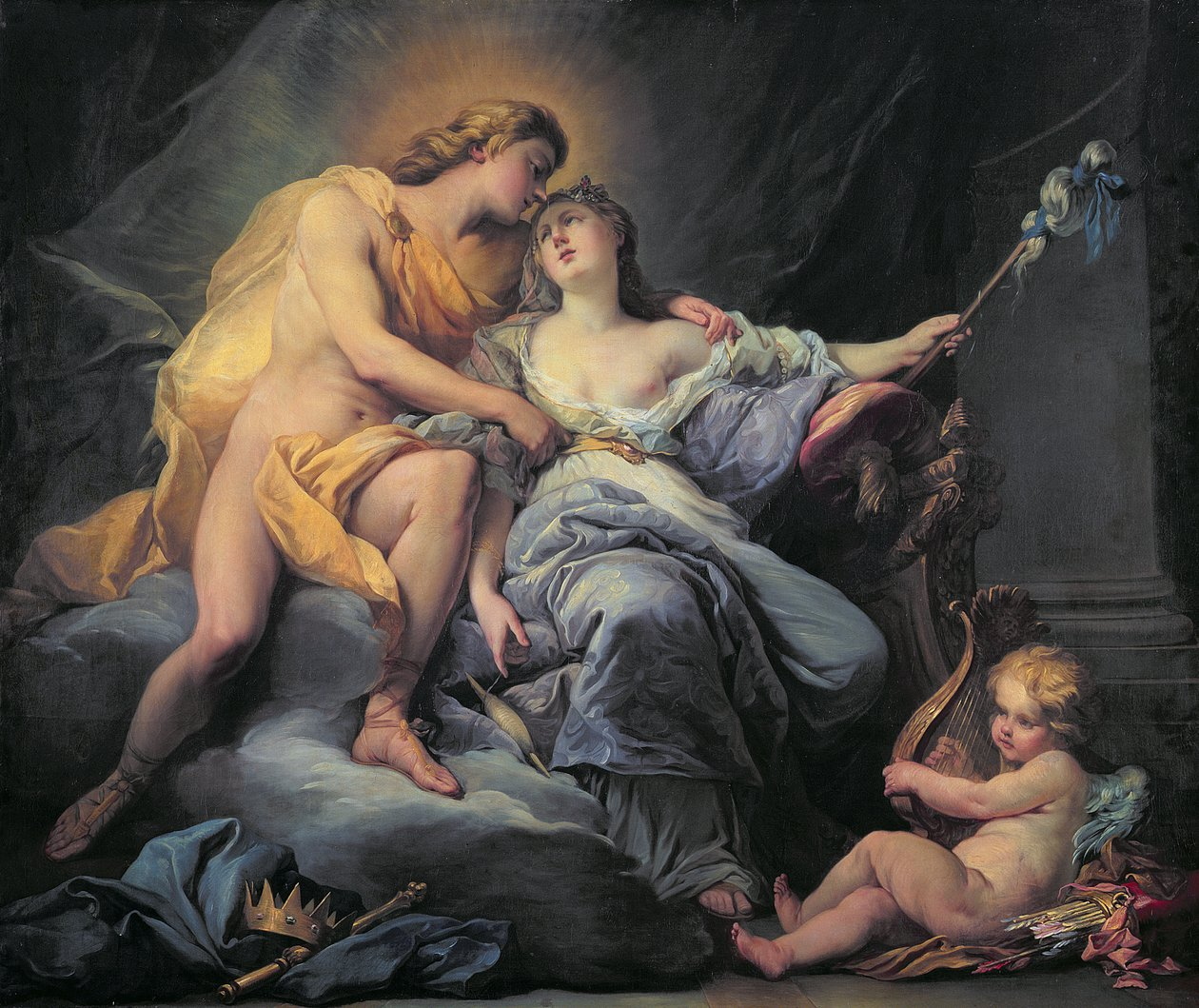
Painting of Apollo (as Helios the Sun) caressing the Nymph Leucothea, by French Painter Antoine Boizot

In Greek mythology, Leucothoe (Ancient Greek: Λευκοθόη, romanized: Leukothóê or Leukothoē, lit. 'running white water', Ancient Greek pronunciation: [leu̯.koˈt^{h}o.εː]), also called Leucothea (/ljuːˈkoʊθiə/; Ancient Greek: Λευκοθέα, romanized: Leukothéa, lit. 'white goddess', Ancient Greek pronunciation: [leu̯.koˈt^{h}e.a]), may refer to the following figures:

- Leucothoe, the Nereid of the sea's brine and one of the fifty marine-nymph daughters of the Old Man of the Sea Nereus and the Oceanid Doris.
- Leucothea or Leucothoe, name of Ino after becoming a sea-deity.
- Leucothoe, a daughter of Orchamus loved by Helios.
