= Hipponoe =

In Greek mythology, Hipponoe (Ancient Greek: Ἱππονόη, romanized: Hipponoê or Hipponoē, lit. 'unruly as a mare') was the "rosy-armed" Nereid, marine-nymph daughter of the 'Old Man of the Sea' Nereus and the Oceanid Doris. Her name means or 'the temper of horses' (i.e. waves).
