= Creneis =

Nereid in Greek mythology

In Greek mythology, Creneis or Crenis (Ancient Greek: Κρηνείς, romanized: Kreneis or Krēneis, lit. 'fountain' or 'spring') was one of the 50 Nereids, sea-nymph daughters of the 'Old Man of the Sea' Nereus and the Oceanid Doris.
