= Ione (mythology) =

Greek deity

In Greek mythology, Ione (Ancient Greek: Ἰόνη, romanized: Iōnē, lit. 'violet' or 'violet flower') may refer to two characters:

- Ione, one of the fifty Nereids, marine-nymph daughters of the 'Old Man of the Sea' Nereus and the Oceanid Doris.
- Ione, one of the nurses of Dionysus who followed him in his Indian campaign.
