= Eumolpe =

Nereid of Greek mythology

In Greek mythology, Eumolpe (Ancient Greek: Εὐμόλπη, lit. 'the fine singer' or 'good singer') was one of the 50 Nereids, sea-nymph daughters of the 'Old Man of the Sea' Nereus and the Oceanid Doris. She may be the same with Eupompe.
