= Calypso (nymphs) =

Any of several nymphs

In Greek mythology, Calypso (/kəˈlɪpsoʊ/; Ancient Greek: Καλυψώ, romanized: Kalupsō or Kalypsô, lit. 'she who conceals' or 'she who hides') is the name of several nymphs, the most well known being:

- Calypso, the nymph who, in Homer's Odyssey, kept Odysseus with her on her island of Ogygia for seven years. Calypso, who fell deeply in love with Odysseus, was only swayed to release him after Athena convinced Zeus to send the order.

Other references to nymphs named Calypso, include:

- Calypso, one of the Oceanids, the 3,000 water nymph daughters of the Titans Oceanus and his sister-wife Tethys. She was, along with several of her sisters, one of the companions of Persephone when the maiden was abducted by Hades, the god of the Underworld. Her name may signify 'the sheltering cave'.
- Calypso, one of the 50 Nereids, sea-nymph daughters of the 'Old Man of the Sea' Nereus and the Oceanid Doris.
- Calypso, one of the Hesperides as named on an ancient Greek vase.
