= Dero (mythology) =

Nereid in Greek mythology

In Greek mythology, Dero (Ancient Greek: Δηρὼ, lit. 'long' or 'to skin, flay or beat') was one of the 50 Nereids, sea-nymph daughters of the "Old Man of the Sea" Nereus and the Oceanid Doris.
