= Cranto =

In Greek mythology, Cranto (Ancient Greek: Κραντὼ, romanized: Kranto) was one of the 50 Nereids, sea-nymph daughters of the 'Old Man of the Sea' Nereus and the Oceanid Doris.
