= Asia (mythology) =

Deities in Greek mythology

In Greek mythology, Asia (Ancient Greek: Ἀσία or Ἀσίη, romanized: Asía, lit. 'land of the sunrise' or 'rising up') may refer to these deities:

- Asia, one of the 3,000 Oceanides, daughter of the Titans Oceanus and Tethys.
- Asia, one of the 50 Nereids, sea-nymph daughters of the "Old Man of the Sea" Nereus and the Oceanid Doris. She was counted in the train of Cyrene and may be the same to the above Asia.
- Asia, a surname of Athena in Colchis. Her worship was believed to have been brought from there by Castor and Polydeuces to Laconia, where a temple was built to her at Las.
