= Neomeris (mythology) =

In Greek mythology, Neomeris (Ancient Greek: Νεόμηρις) was one of the 50 Nereids, marine-nymph daughters of the 'Old Man of the Sea' Nereus and the Oceanid Doris. She may be the same with Nemertes.
