= Leiagore =

Nereid in Greek mythology

In Greek mythology, Leiagore or Leiagora (Ancient Greek: Ληαγόρη, romanized: Lêagorê or Leagore, lit. 'assembler' or 'addressing the people') was the Nereid of assembling (fish or navies). She was one of the 50 marine-nymph daughters of the 'Old Man of the Sea' Nereus and the Oceanid Doris.
