= Lycorias =

In Greek mythology, Lycorias (Ancient Greek: Λυκωριάς, romanized: Lykōriás, lit. 'woman of Lycoreia' or relates to 'wolf-mountain') was the "yellow haired" Nereid, one of the fifty marine-nymph daughters of 'Old Man of the Sea' Nereus and the Oceanid Doris.

== Mythology ==
Lycorias was mentioned by Virgil as one of the nymphs in the train of Cyrene

"But from her chamber in the river depth the mother heard his cry. Around her the Nymphs carded Milesian fleeces stained with rich sea-dyes, Drymo and Xantho, Ligea and Phyllodoce, their bright tresses falling loose over their snowy necks; and Cydippe and golden-haired Lycorias, the one a maiden, the other even then knowing the first throes of travail; and Clio and Beroë her sister, both daughters of Ocean, both"
