= Eucrante =

Nereid of Greek mythology

In Greek mythology, Eucrante (Ancient Greek: Εὐκράντη, romanized: Eukrantê, lit. 'the bringer of fulfillment' or 'she who accomplishes/ grants success') was one of the 50 Nereids, sea-nymph daughters of the 'Old Man of the Sea' Nereus and the Oceanid Doris.
