= Ianassa =

Nereid in Greek mythology

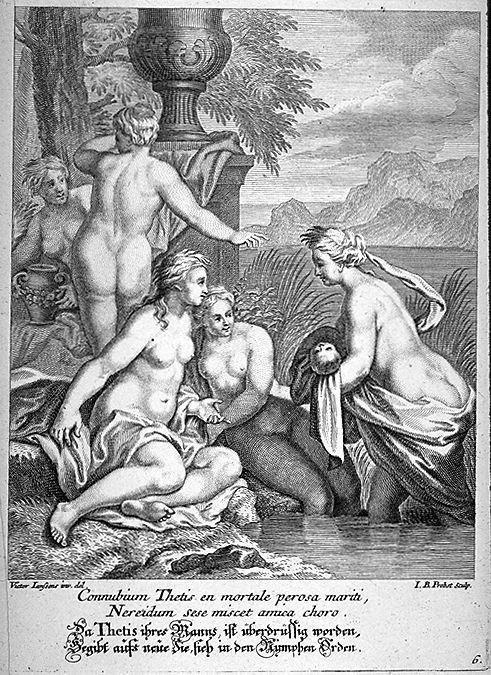

In Greek mythology, Ianassa (Ancient Greek: Ἰάνασσα, lit. 'wedded voice', 'wedded queen' or 'queen of Ias') or Janassa was one of the 50 Nereids, marine-nymph daughters of the 'Old Man of the Sea' Nereus and the Oceanid Doris. She and her other sisters appear to Thetis when she cries out in sympathy for the grief of Achilles at the slaying of his friend Patroclus.
