= Cymo (mythology) =

Nereid of Greek mythology

In Greek mythology, Cymo (Ancient Greek: Κυμώ, romanized: Kymó, lit. 'the wave-goddess' or 'wave') was one of the 50 Nereids, sea-nymph daughters of the 'Old Man of the Sea' Nereus and the Oceanid Doris.
