= Polynome (mythology) =

In Greek mythology, Polynome (Ancient Greek: Πολυνόμη means 'the many pastured') was the Nereid of sea caverns and one of the 50 marine-nymph daughters of the 'Old Man of the Sea' Nereus and the Oceanid Doris.
