= Pasithea (mythology) =

Characters in Greek mythology

In Greek mythology, Pasithea (Ancient Greek: Πασιθέα or Πασιθέη Pasitheê, possibly meaning 'the one who runs to all' or 'the Goddess revered by all') may refer to the following figures:

- Pasithea, one of the 50 Nereids, marine-nymph daughters of the 'Old Man of the Sea' Nereus and the Oceanid Doris.
- Pasithea, one of the younger Charites, the consort of Sleep (Hypnos).
- Pasithea, a naiad who was married to King Erichthonius of Athens and by him the mother of Pandion I and others. Usually, her name is given as Praxithea.
