= Apseudes =

Nereid of Greek mythology

In Greek mythology, Apseudes (Ancient Greek: Ἀψευδής, romanized: Apseudēs, lit. 'truthful', 'without lies' or 'the shiner') was one of the 50 Nereids, sea-nymph daughters of the 'Old Man of the Sea' Nereus and the Oceanid Doris. Her name means 'she who never lies', which like her sister Nemertes, inherited their father's quality of a god who tells the truth.

== Mythology ==
Apseudes and her other sisters appeared to Thetis when she cries out in sympathy for the grief of Achilles for his slain friend Patroclus.
