= Cymothoe (mythology) =

Nereid in Greek mythology

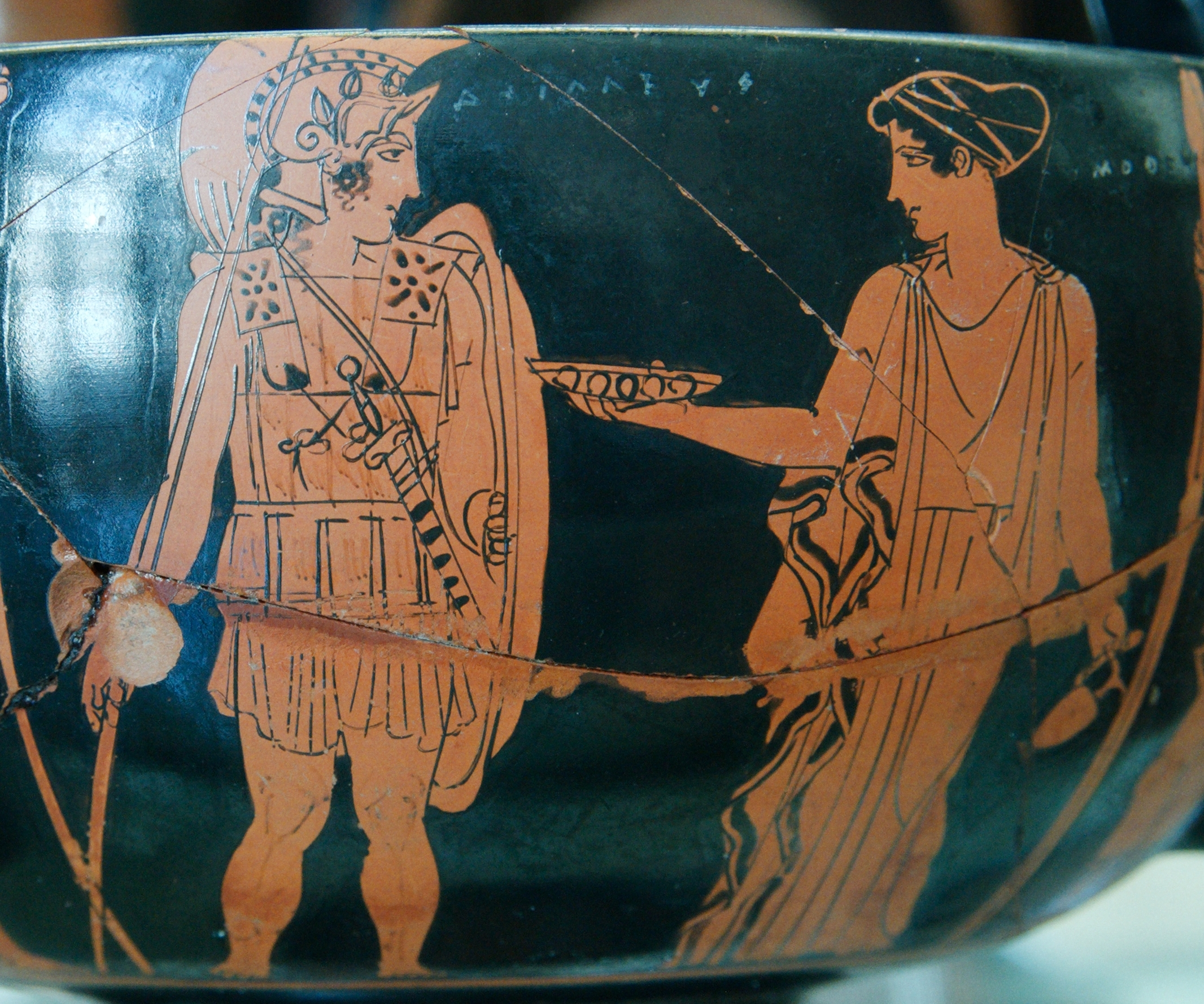
Achilles departure from Eretria

In Greek mythology, Cymothoë (Ancient Greek: Κυμοθόη, romanized: Kymothoê or Kymothóē, lit. 'wave-swift' or 'she who runs with the waves') was the "cerulean" Nereid of gentle and quiet waves. She was a marine-nymph daughter of the "Old Man of the Sea" Nereus and the Oceanid Doris.

== Mythology ==
Cymothoe and the sea-god Glaucus rescued Helle when she fell from the golden ram.

She also appeared in the account of Quintus Smyrnaeus' Posthomerica:

"Against the wise Prometheus bitter-wroth the Sea-maids were, remembering how that Zeus, moved by his prophecies, unto Peleus gave Thetis to wife, a most unwilling bride. Then cried in wrath to these Cymothoe: "O that the pestilent prophet had endured all pangs he merited, when, deep-burrowing, the eagle tare his liver aye renewed!"

Later on, Cymothoe and her other sisters appeared to Thetis when she cries out in sympathy for the grief of Achilles for his slain friend Patroclus.

In the first book of the Aeneid, she and Triton rescue the Trojans' ships that had run aground on rocks.
