= Neso (mythology) =

Set index of characters from Greek mythology

In Greek mythology, Neso (Ancient Greek: Νησώ Nêsô means 'the island-goddess' or 'nimble') may refer to the following characters:

- Neso, one of the 50 Nereids, marine-nymph daughters of the 'Old Man of the Sea' Nereus and the Oceanid Doris.
- Neso, mother of the Cumaean sibyl.
- Neso, daughter of King Teucer.
