= Pherusa =

Ancient Greek deity

Pherusa or Pherousa (Ancient Greek: Φέρουσα means 'the bringer') was the name of two female deities in Greek mythology:

- Pherusa, one of the 50 Nereids, marine-nymph daughters of the 'Old Man of the Sea' Nereus and the Oceanid Doris. Her name, a participle, means "she who carries." She, along with her sister Dynamene, were associated with the power of great ocean swells. Pherousa and her other sisters appear to Thetis when she cries out in sympathy for the grief of Achilles at the slaying of his friend Patroclus.
- Pherusa, one of the Horae according to Hyginus.
