= Callianassa (mythology) =

In Greek mythology, Callianassa (Ancient Greek: Καλλιάνασσα, romanized: Kallianassa, lit. 'lovely queen' or 'beautiful queen') was one of the 50 Nereids, sea-nymph daughters of the 'Old Man of the Sea' Nereus and the Oceanid Doris.

== Mythology ==
Callianassa and her other sisters appeared to Thetis when she cries out in sympathy for the grief of Achilles for his slain friend Patroclus.

== Zoology ==
The genus of mud shrimps Callianassa, as well as the Callianassidae family it belongs to, were named after the nereid.
