= Pontoporeia (mythology) =

Nereid

In Greek mythology, Pontoporeia, Pontoporea or Pontopereia (Ancient Greek: Ποντοπόρεια means 'the seafarer') was the Nereid of sea-crossing and one of the 50 marine-nymph daughters of the 'Old Man of the Sea' Nereus and the Oceanid Doris.
