= Callianeira =

In Greek mythology, Callianeira (Ancient Greek: Καλλιάνειρα, romanized: Kallianeira, lit. 'beautiful woman' or 'lovely one') was one of the 50 Nereids, sea-nymph daughters of the 'Old Man of the Sea' Nereus and the Oceanid Doris.

== Mythology ==
Callianeira and her other sisters appeared to Thetis when she cries out in sympathy for the grief of Achilles for his slain friend Patroclus.
