= Eulimene =

Eulimene (Ancient Greek: Εὐλιμήνη, romanized: Eulimenê, lit. 'she of good haven' or 'good-harbour-woman') was the name of two characters in Greek mythology.

- Eulimene, the Nereid of good harborage and one of the 50 sea-nymph daughters of the 'Old Man of the Sea' Nereus and the Oceanid Doris.
- Eulimene of Crete, daughter of Cydon, and the girl who was betrothed to Apterus (who was the most famous man among the Cretans). In spite of this betrothal, she had an affair with another man, Lycastus. When Cydon consulted the oracles to discover how to beat his enemies, they told him to sacrifice a virgin. He cast lots on all the virgins of the area, and the fatal lot was cast upon his own daughter. Even though Lycastus confessed to having slept with her, she was still condemned to death, after which an examination of her body proved that she had been pregnant. Apterus murdered Lycastus after the pregnancy of Eulimene was revealed, and he went into exile to Xanthus at Termera in Lycia.
