= Amatheia =

Nereid of Greek mythology

In Greek mythology, Amatheia (Ancient Greek: Ἀμάθεια, lit. 'rears', 'nurses' or 'she is sparkling water') was the "fair-tressed" Nereid and was described to have "azure locks luxuriant" or as some translations put it "long, heavy hair". As one of these 50 sea-nymphs, she was the daughter of the "Old Man of the Sea" Nereus and the Oceanid Doris. Variations of her names were Æmathia, Amathea and Amathia which means "queen of voice".

== Mythology ==
Amatheia and her other sisters appeared to Thetis when she cries out in sympathy for the grief of Achilles for his slain friend Patroclus.
