= Clio (mythology) =

Set of mythological Greek characters

In Greek mythology, Clio (/ˈkliːoʊ/, more rarely /ˈklaɪoʊ/; Ancient Greek: Κλειώ, romanized: Kleiṓ, lit. 'made famous' or 'to make famous'), also spelled Cleio, may refer to the following women:

- Clio, one of the 3,000 Oceanids, water nymph daughters of the Titans Oceanus and his sister-spouse Tethys. Her name means "fame-giver".
- Clio or Cleio, one of the 50 Nereids, the sea-nymph daughters of 'Old Man of the Sea' Nereus and the Oceanid Doris.
- Clio, one of the Muses, daughters of Zeus and the Titan Mnemosyne.
- Cleo, one of the 50 Danaides, daughters of the Libyan king Danaus. She married and murdered her cousin-husband Asterius.
