= Laomedeia (mythology) =

Ancient Greek deity

In Greek mythology, Laomedeia or Laomedea (Ancient Greek: Λαομέδεια, lit. 'ruleress of the people', 'counsel the people' or 'leader of the folk') was one of the 50 Nereids, marine-nymph daughters of the 'Old Man of the Sea' Nereus and the Oceanid Doris.
