= Ianeira =

Name in Greek mythology

Ianeira or Ianira (/ˌaɪ.əˈnaɪərə/; Ancient Greek: Ἰάνειρά, lit. 'lady of the Ionians') or Janira was a name attributed to three characters in Greek mythology.

- Ianeira, one of the 3,000 Oceanids, water-nymph daughters of the Titans Oceanus and Tethys. According to the Homeric Hymn, she one of the "deep-bosomed daughters of Oceanus" gathering flowers with Persephone when she was abducted by Hades.
- Ianeira, one of the 50 Nereids, marine-nymph daughters of the "Old Man of the Sea" Nereus and the Oceanid Doris. She and her other sisters appear to Thetis when she cries out in sympathy for the grief of Achilles at the slaying of his friend Patroclus.
- Ianeira, possible spouse of Capaneus.
