= Phyllodoce (mythology) =

Nereid of Greek mythology

In Greek mythology, Phyllodoce was one of the 50 Nereids, sea-nymph daughters of the 'Old Man of the Sea' Nereus and the Oceanid Doris. She was one of the nymphs in the train of Cyrene. Phyllodoce was described to have bright, waving locks of hair and a slender pale neck.
