= Actaea (mythology) =

Refers to several individuals in Greek mythology

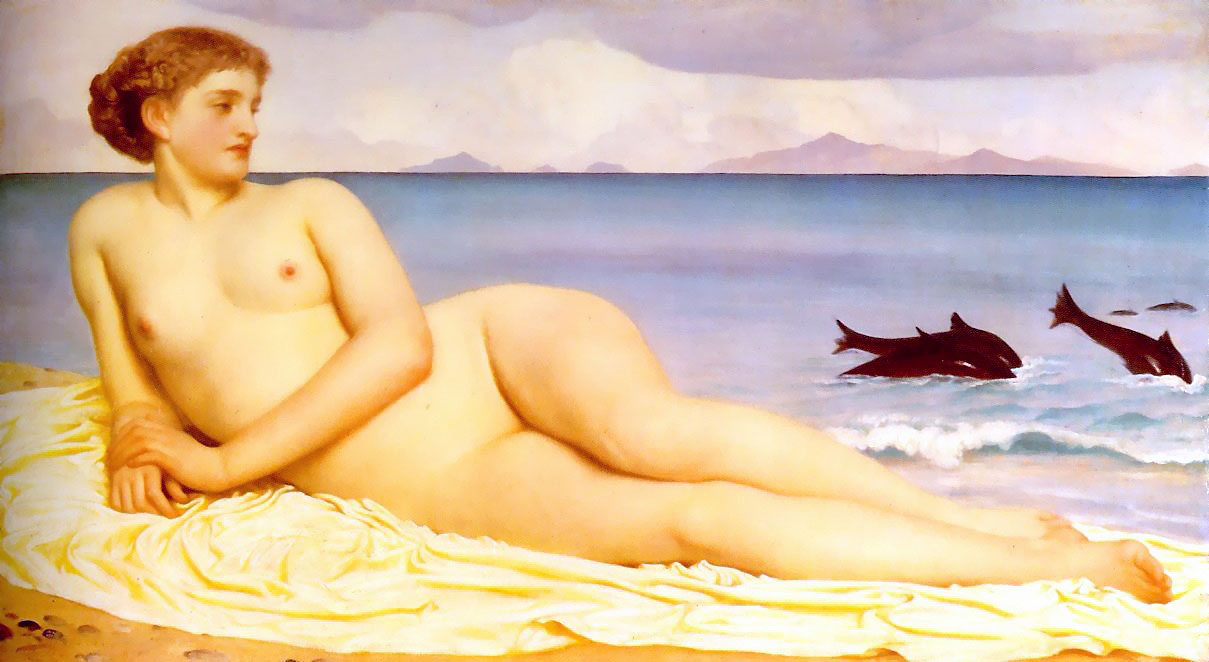
Actaea, the Nymph of the Shore by Frederic Leighton (1853–1858)

In Greek mythology, Actaeä or Aktaia (/ækˈtiːə/; Ancient Greek: Ἀκταία, romanized: Aktaía, lit. 'the dweller on coasts') may refer to the following figures:

- Actaea or Actea, the Nereid of rocky shore. These 50 sea-nymphs are daughters of the "Old Man of the Sea" Nereus and the Oceanid Doris. Actaea and her other sisters appeared to Thetis when she cried out in sympathy for the grief of Achilles for his slain friend Patroclus.
- Actaea, a Libyan princess was one of the Danaïdes, daughters of King Danaus and Pieria. She married and murdered her cousin Periphas, son of Aegyptus on their wedding night at the command of her father.

== Other use ==
Actaea, the former name of Attica, whose first king was Actaeus. It was renamed in honour of Atthis, daughter of King Cranaus of Athens.
