= Eupompe =

Nereid of Greek mythology

In Greek mythology, Eupompe (Ancient Greek: Εὐπόμπη, romanized: Eupompê, lit. 'she of good escort', 'good journey' or 'the fine procession') was the "rosy-armed" Nereid of good festive or processional voyage. She was one of the 50 sea-nymph daughters of the 'Old Man of the Sea' Nereus and the Oceanid Doris. She may be the same with Eumolpe.
