= Eunice (mythology) =

Nereid of Greek mythology

In Greek mythology, Eunica or Euneica (Ancient Greek: Εὔνικα, romanized: Eunika), also Eunice (Ancient Greek: Εὐνίκη, romanized: Eunikē, lit. 'she of happy victory' or 'good victory'), may refer to two distinct nymphs:

- Eunice, the "rosy-armed" Nereid, sea-nymph daughter of the 'Old Man of the Sea' Nereus and the Oceanid Doris. She is described as leaping and dancing from wave to wave.
- Eunica, a naiad associated with the myth of Hylas and the Argonauts. She inhabited the spring of Pegae near Lake Ascanius in Mysia (or Bithynia). When the Argo stopped in Mysia during the quest for the Golden Fleece, Heracles's young companion Hylas went to fetch water from her spring. Captivated by his beauty, Eunica and her fellow nymphs (typically named Nycheia and Malis) pulled Hylas down into their pool, causing him to vanish forever and prompting Heracles to abandon the expedition to search for him.
