= Euarne (mythology) =

In Greek mythology, Euarne or Evarne (Ancient Greek: Εὐάρνη, romanized: Euarnê, lit. 'lovely of shape' or 'without blemish of form') was the Nereid of marble rocks. She was the sea-nymph daughter of the 'Old Man of the Sea' Nereus and the Oceanid Doris.
