= Thoe =

Ancient Greek deities

In Greek mythology, Thoe (Ancient Greek: Θόη, romanized: Thoê, lit. 'quick', 'nimble' or 'the runner') may refer to the following women:

- Thoe, one of the 3,000 Oceanids, water-nymph daughters of the Titans, Oceanus and his sister-spouse Tethys.
- Thoe, one of the 50 Nereids, marine-nymph daughters of the 'Old Man of the Sea' Nereus and the Oceanid Doris.
- Thoe, an Amazon fighting in Aeetes' army against the troops of Perses. She was killed by Gesander.

== See also ==
- Thoen (name)

== Literature ==
- Gaius Julius Hyginus, Fabulae from The Myths of Hyginus translated and edited by Mary Grant. University of Kansas Publications in Humanistic Studies. Online version at the Topos Text Project.
- Gaius Valerius Flaccus, Argonautica translated by Mozley, J H. Loeb Classical Library Volume 286. Cambridge, MA, Harvard University Press; London, William Heinemann Ltd. 1928. Online version at theio.com.
- Gaius Valerius Flaccus, Argonauticon. Otto Kramer. Leipzig. Teubner. 1913. Latin text available at the Perseus Digital Library.
- Hesiod, Theogony from The Homeric Hymns and Homerica with an English Translation by Hugh G. Evelyn-White, Cambridge, MA., Harvard University Press; London, William Heinemann Ltd. 1914. Online version at the Perseus Digital Library. Greek text available from the same website.
- Homer, The Iliad with an English Translation by A.T. Murray, Ph.D. in two volumes. Cambridge, MA., Harvard University Press; London, William Heinemann, Ltd. 1924. Online version at the Perseus Digital Library.
- Homer, Homeri Opera in five volumes. Oxford, Oxford University Press. 1920. Greek text available at the Perseus Digital Library.
- Kerényi, Carl, The Gods of the Greeks, Thames and Hudson, London, 1951.
