= Dexamene =

Nereid in Greek mythology

In Greek mythology, Dexamene (Ancient Greek: Δεξαμένη, lit. 'she who is hospitable', 'welcoming' or 'the receiver') was one of the 50 Nereids, sea-nymph daughters of the 'Old Man of the Sea' Nereus and the Oceanid Doris.

== Mythology ==
Dexamene and her other sisters appeared to Thetis when she cries out in sympathy for the grief of Achilles for his slain friend Patroclus.
