= Cymatolege =

Nereid of Greek mythology

In Greek mythology, Cymatolege (Ancient Greek: Κυματολήγη, romanized: Kymatolêgê, lit. 'wave-stiller' or '"the end of waves') was one of the 50 Nereids, sea-nymph daughters of the 'Old Man of the Sea' Nereus and the Oceanid Doris.
