= Amphithoe =

Nereid of Greek mythology

In Greek mythology, Amphithoë (Ancient Greek: Ἀμφιθόη, romanized: Amphithoē, lit. 'she who moves swiftly around' or 'the shouter') was the Nereid of sea currents and thus a daughter of the 'Old Man of the Sea' Nereus and the Oceanid Doris. She was probably the same as Amphitrite.

== Mythology ==
Amphithoe and her other sisters appeared to Thetis when she cries out in sympathy for the grief of Achilles for his slain friend Patroclus.
