= Galene (mythology) =

Minor goddess personifying calm seas (Ancient Greek)

In ancient Greek religion and mythology, Galene (Ancient Greek: Γαλήνη, romanized: Galênê, lit. 'calm weather' or 'calm, tranquility') may refer to the following characters:

- Galene, a minor goddess personifying calm seas. Hesiod enumerates her as one of the 50 Nereids, sea-nymph daughters of the 'Old Man of the Sea' Nereus and the Oceanid Doris, perhaps identical with her sister Galatea. Meanwhile, Euripides mentions "Galaneia" (Galênaiê) as a daughter of Pontus and Callimachus refers to her as "Galenaia". A statue of Galene, next to that of Thalassa, was mentioned by Pausanias as an offering at the temple of Poseidon in Corinth. The alternative name Galatea, which gained currency in the 18th century, may refer to same goddess.
- Galene, named as a maenad in a vase painting.

Galene also provides the name for the main belt asteroid 427 Galene.
