= Nausithoe (mythology) =

In Greek mythology, Nausithoe (Ancient Greek: Ναυσιθόη means 'swift ships') was the Nereid of swift ships and one of the 50 marine-nymph daughters of the 'Old Man of the Sea' Nereus and the Oceanid Doris.
