= Sao (mythology) =

Nereid of Greek mythology

In Greek mythology, Sao (Ancient Greek: Σαώ Saô means 'the rescuer') was one of the 50 Nereids, the daughters of the sea god Nereus and the Oceanid Doris.
