= Nemertes =

Nemertes may refer to:

- Nemertes (mythology), one of the Nereids in Greek mythology
- Nemertes, a junior synonym of a genus of worms, Lineus, in the family Lineidae
