= Glauconome (mythology) =

Daughter of Nereus

In Greek mythology, Glauconome (Ancient Greek: Γλαυκονόμη, romanized: Glaukonomê, lit. 'the dweller in the green sea' or 'she who dwells in the green sea') was the "fond of laughter" Nereid, sea-nymph daughter of the 'Old Man of the Sea' Nereus and the Oceanid Doris.
