= Proto (mythology) =

In Greek mythology, Proto or Protho (/ˈprəʊtəʊ/; Ancient Greek: Πρωτὼ Prôtô means 'the first' or 'the receiver') was the Nereid of the first or maiden voyage and one of the 50 marine-nymph daughters of the 'Old Man of the Sea' Nereus and the Oceanid Doris. She and her other sisters appear to Thetis when she cries out in sympathy for the grief of Achilles at the slaying of his friend Patroclus.
