= Limnoreia =

Nereid in Greek mythology

In Greek mythology, Limnoreia, Limnoria or Lymnoria (Ancient Greek: Λιμνώρεια, romanized: Limnōreia, lit. 'salt-marsh lady' or 'water-nymph of the marsh') was the Nereid of the salt marshes and one of the 50 marine-nymph daughters of the 'Old Man of the Sea' Nereus and the Oceanid Doris. She and her other sisters appear to Thetis when she cries out in sympathy for the grief of Achilles at the slaying of his friend Patroclus.
