= Protomedeia =

Sea nymph in Greek mythology

In Greek mythology, Protomedea or Protomedia (Ancient Greek: Πρωτομέδεια Prôtomedeia) was one of the 50 Nereids, marine-nymph daughters of the sea god Nereus and the Oceanid Doris. Her name means 'the first ruleress' or 'first queen, first counsel'.
