= Dynamene =

Nereid of Greek mythology

In Greek mythology, Dynamene (/dɪˈnæmɪniː, daɪ-/; Ancient Greek: Δυναμένη, lit. 'the bringer', 'she who can' or 'the capable one') was a Nereid or sea-nymph, one of the 50 daughters of the "Old Man of the Sea" Nereus and the Oceanid Doris. Her name, a participle, means "she who can, the capable one." She, along with her sister Pherusa, was associated with the might and power of great ocean swells. Dynamene had the ability to appear and disappear rapidly. Some variations of her name were Dyomene and Dinamene

== Mythology ==
In Homer's Iliad, Dynamene and her other sisters appear to Thetis when she cries out in sympathy for the grief of Achilles at the slaying of his friend Patroclus.
