= Nerites (mythology) =

Minor sea god in Greek mythology

- Sea god
- Abode: Sea
- Texts: On the Characteristics of Animals

Genealogy
- Parents: Nereus and Doris
- Siblings: Nereids
- Consort: Aphrodite or Poseidon

In Greek mythology, Nerites (Ancient Greek: Νηρίτης, romanized: Nērítēs, lit. 'sea snail') is a minor sea deity, the son of "Old Man of the Sea" Nereus and the Oceanid nymph Doris, and brother of the fifty Nereids (apparently their only male sibling). He was described as a young boy of stunning beauty. He is attested in a single source, Claudius Aelianus' On the Characteristics of Animals, where he said that Nerites was "celebrated in mariners' tales".

== Etymology ==
According to Aristotle, the word nerites refers to many species of sea snails. R. S. P. Beekes suggests a Pre-Greek origin for the word.

== Mythology ==
Aelian cites two versions of the myth concerning Nerites, which are as follows:

=== Aphrodite ===
In the first version, Aphrodite, before her ascension from the sea to Olympus, fell in love with Nerites. When the time had come for her to join the Olympian gods, she wanted Nerites to go with her, but he refused, preferring to stay with his family in the sea. Even the fact that Aphrodite promised him a pair of wings did not make him change his mind. The scorned goddess then transformed him into a shellfish and later gave the wings to her son, Eros.

=== Poseidon ===
In the second version, Nerites was loved by Poseidon and answered his feelings. Their love was the origin of mutual love (Anteros). Poseidon also made Nerites his charioteer; the boy drove the chariot astonishingly fast, to the admiration of various sea creatures. The sun god Helios, for reasons unknown to Aelian's sources, changed Nerites into a shellfish; the narrative of the love-story is disrupted by Helios who is resentful of the boy's speed as a fellow charioteer, but with no explanation behind it, allowing Aelian to conjecture that the two gods were rivals in love and Helios might have wanted the boy's affections for himself and was offended by his refusal. Aelian also suggested that Helios was angered at Nerites being amongst the sea monsters with his skill and wished for him to be amongst the constellations.

== Iconography ==
In the nineteenth century, several terracotta figurines from the Greek island of Aegina were identified by the German archaeologist Karl Bernhard Stark as artistic representations of Aphrodite with Nerites.

== See also ==
- Adonis
- Ganymede
- Pelops
- Phaethon
- Greek sea gods
