= Cymothoe =

Cymothoe may refer to:

- Cymothoe (mythology), one of the Nereids, known for helping Aeneas retrieve his ships, along with Triton, after Aeolus buffeted his fleet on the orders of Juno
- Cymothoe (butterfly), a genus of African butterflies
