= Nemertes (mythology) =

Nereid in Greek mythology

In Greek mythology, Nemertes (Ancient Greek: Νημερτής Nêmertês means 'the unerring' or 'truthful' or 'the giver') was the Nereid of unerring (good council) and one of the 50 marine-nymph daughters of the 'Old Man of the Sea' Nereus and the Oceanid Doris. Like her sister Apseudes, she resembles her immortal father for knowing and telling the truth. Nimertis may be the same with another Nereid Neomeris.

== Mythology ==
Nemertes and her other sisters appear to Thetis when she cries out in sympathy for the grief of Achilles at the slaying of his friend Patroclus.
