= Doto (mythology) =

Greek mythical sea nymph

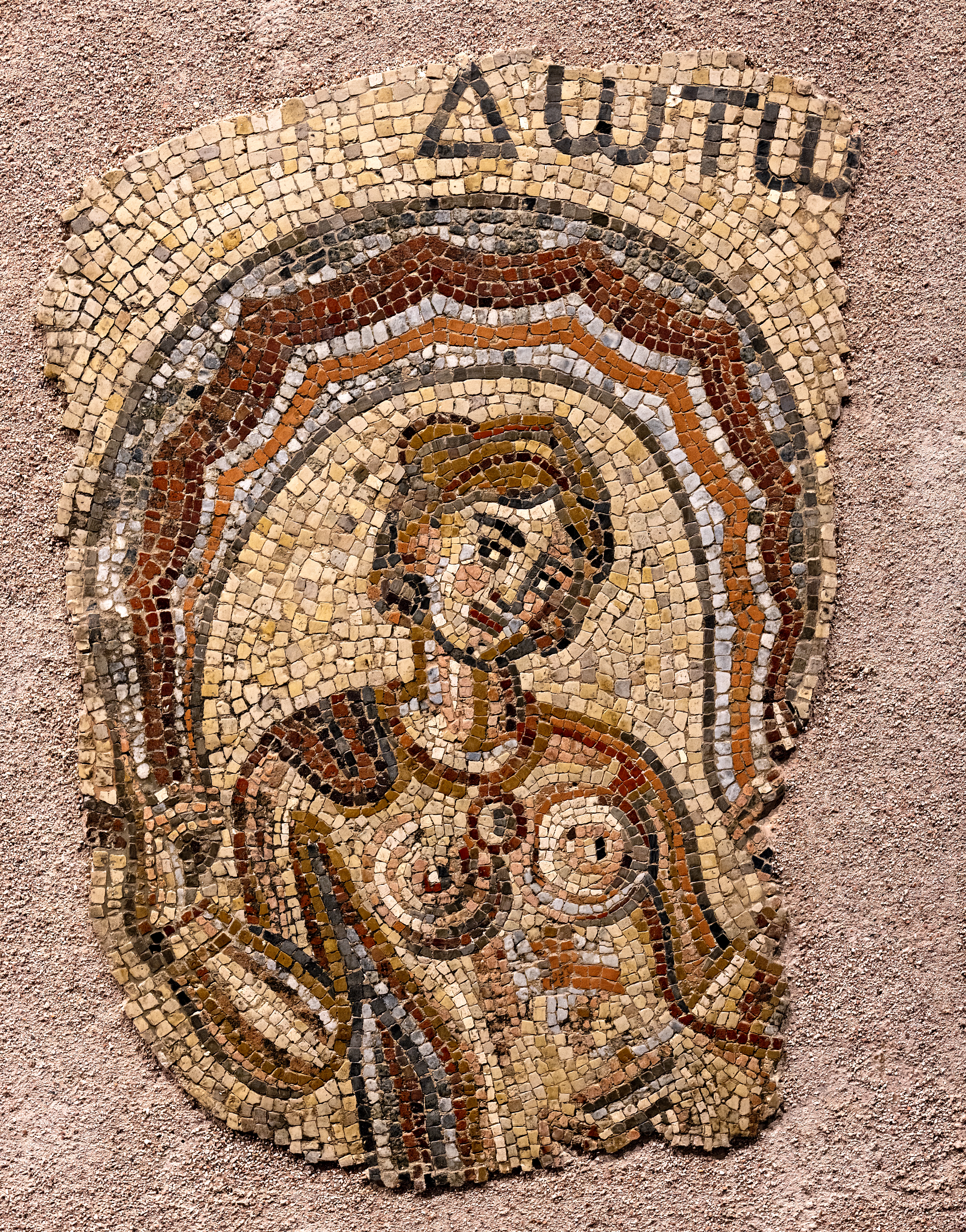
Mosaic fragment with Doto, discovered in 1833 in a Roman villa in Saint-Rustice, 4th or 5th century, Saint-Raymon Museum.

In Greek mythology, Doto (Ancient Greek: Δωτώ, romanized: Dōtṓ, lit. 'giver' or 'she who grants') was one of the 50 Nereids, sea-nymph daughters of the "Old Man of the Sea" Nereus and the Oceanid nymph Doris.

== Mythology ==
Doto, together with Panope and Galatea, escorted her sister Thetis out of the sea to her wedding with Peleus. Later on, Doto and her other sisters appeared to Thetis when she cries out in sympathy for the grief of Achilles for his slain friend Patroclus.
