= Doto =

Doto can refer to:

- Doto (mythology), one of the Nereids
- Doto (gastropod), a genus of sea-slug

It can also refer to:

- DOTO, the former Dutch football club Door Ontwikkeling Tot Ontspanning
- Dotö, one of the Tibetan names for the Kham region
- Meisho Doto, a Japanese Thoroughbred racehorse.
