= Glauconome =

Glauconome may refer to:

- Glauconome (mythology), a Nereid in Greek mythology
- Glauconome (bivalve), a genus of molluscs in the order Venerida
- Glauconome (bryozoan), a genus of bryozoans in the family Arthrostylidae
