= Crossroads (folklore) =

Places in folklore where the supernatural can happen

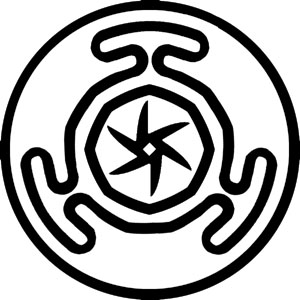
Hecate's wheel, the "Strophalos" (στρόφαλος), is also a symbol of the Crossroads

In folklore, crossroads may represent a location "between the worlds" and, as such, a site where supernatural spirits can be contacted and paranormal events can take place. Symbolically, it can mean a locality where two realms touch and therefore represents liminality, a place in space and/or a point in time literally "neither here nor there", "betwixt and between".

== Ancient religions ==
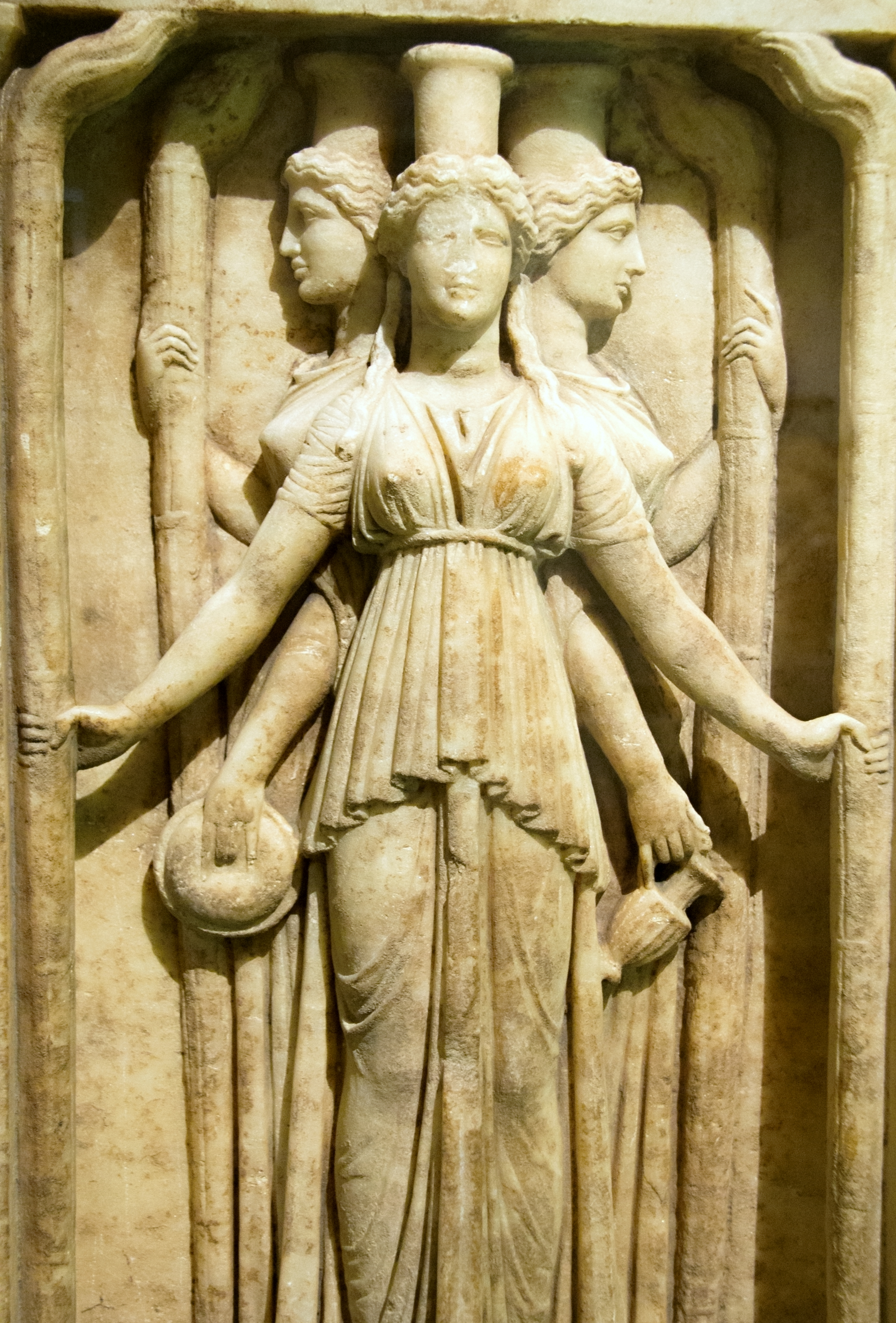
Relief triplicate Hekate marble - The Goddess Hekate resides at crossroads.

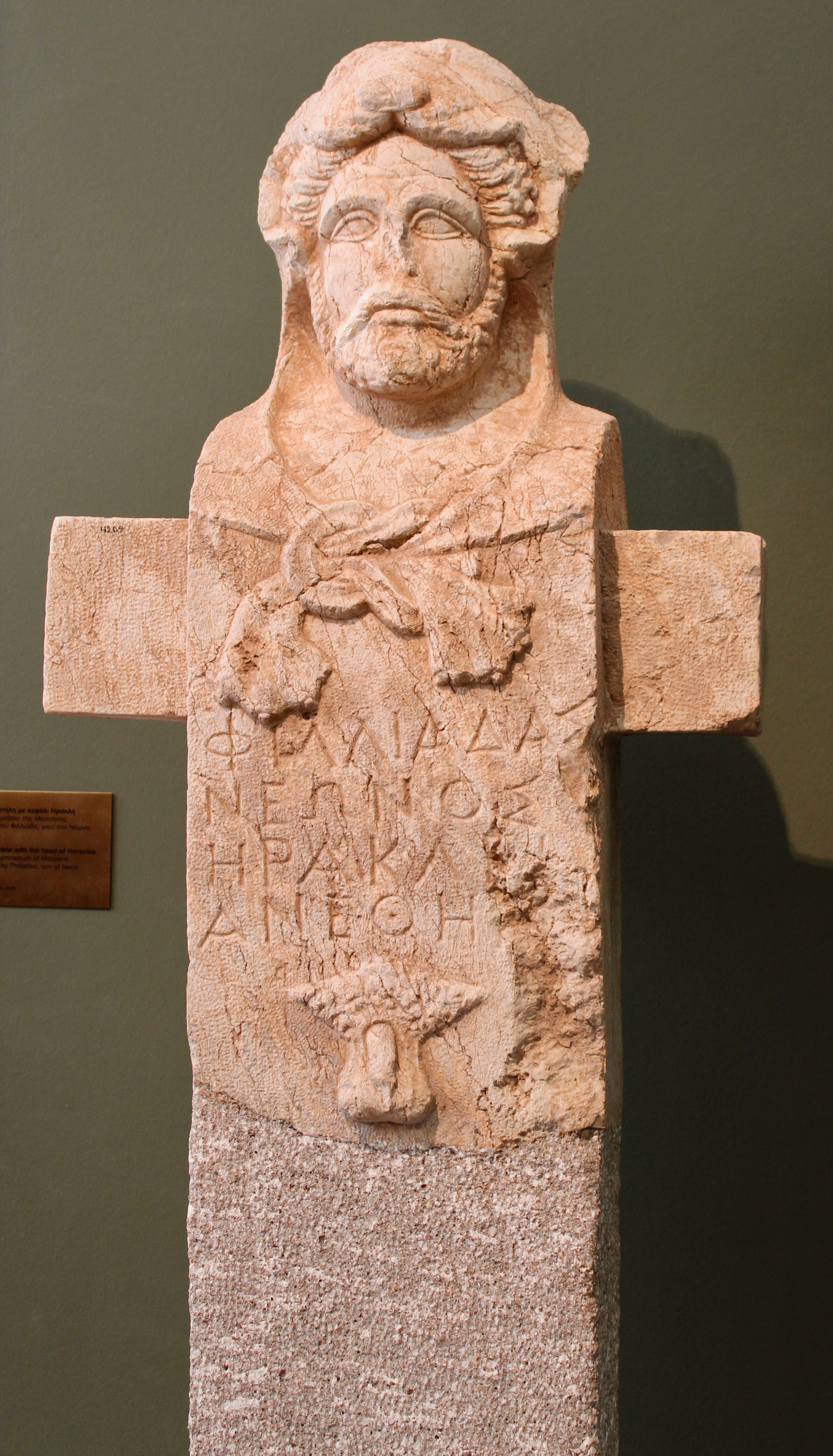
A herma was a statue associated with Hermes. It was used to mark boundaries and crossroads in ancient Greece, and thought to ward off evil. Museum of Ancient Messene, Greece.

In Greek mythology, crossroads (the term τριοδία (triodia) was used for a three-way junction, the term τετραοδία (tetraodia) was used for a four-way intersection, διασταύρωσις (diastaúrosis) was a general term for a crossing or intersection used in later classical contexts, and σταυροδρόμιον (staurodromion) was a later Hellenistic and Byzantine term derived from stauros (cross) and dromos (road), which evolved into the modern Greek word σταυροδρόμι (stavrodrómi)) were associated with both Hecate and Hermes, with shrines and ceremonies for both taking place there. The herm pillar associated with Hermes frequently marked these places due to the god's association with travelers and role as a guide. Though less central to Greek mythology than Hermes, Hecate's connection to crossroads was more cemented in ritual. 'Suppers of Hecate' were left for her at crossroads at each new moon, and one of her most common titles was 'goddess of the crossroads.' In her later three-fold depictions, each of the three heads or bodies is often associated with one of three crossing roads.

"According to the fourth-century historian Philochorus,... at Athens, offerings also were sent to the crossroads on the sixteenth of the month - i.e., half a month after the new-moon offering, at the time of the full moon." In Graeco-Roman society, rituals of protection were done at crossroads and purification ritual remains were left at the crossroads. The Greeks and Romans believed doors, gates, rivers, frontiers and crossroads held spiritual meanings regarding transitioning, leaving one area and going somewhere else, a change in directions physically and spiritually; Therefore rituals of protection and rituals regarding change (transition) were done at crossroads.

An 11th-century homily called De Falsis Deis tells us that Mercury or Odin were honored on crossroads.

53. Sum man eac wæs gehaten Mercurius on life, se wæs swyðe facenfull
54. And, ðeah full snotorwyrde, swicol on dædum and on leasbregdum. Ðone
55. macedon þa hæðenan be heora getæle eac heom to mæran gode and æt wega
56. gelætum him lac offrodon oft and gelome þurh deofles lare and to heagum
57. beorgum him brohton oft mistlice loflac.

The modern English text gives: "There once lived a man named Mercury, who was very deceitful, and, though quite wise in speech, was treacherous in actions and lies. The pagans, in their account, also made him their great god and often and frequently offered him sacrifices at crossroads, through the teachings of the devil, and to high hills they often brought various offerings of praise."

== Medieval folklore ==
In Great Britain, there existed a tradition of burying criminals and suicides at the crossroads. This may have been due to the crossroads marking the boundaries of the settlement coupled with a desire to bury those outside of the law outside the settlement, or that the many roads would confuse the dead. Crossroads were also commonly used as a place of criminal punishment and execution (e.g. by gibbet or dule tree), which may have also been a reason for its being a site of suicidal burial as suicide was considered a crime. This ritual of crossroads burial dates back to Anglo-Saxon times and continued until being abolished in 1823.

While they became a place of burial for suicides and others unable to be given proper burial in the Middle Ages, the crossroads were once a burial place second only to the consecrated church for Christians.

In Western folk mythology, a crossroads can be used to summon a demon or devil in order to make a deal. This legend can be seen in many stories. For example, the 1587 Historia von D. Johann Fausten, describes the character Faust inscribing magic circles at a crossroads in order to summon the devil. The Freischütz folktales often similarly involve summoning the devil at a crossroads in order to cast magic bullets.

In the 1885 historical essay Transylvanian Superstitions, Emily Gerard describes how crossroads were often avoided as a matter of course, and describes a Romanian belief that a demon could be summoned at a crossroad by drawing a magic circle, offering copper coin as payment, and reciting an incantation.

== African and African diasporic religions ==
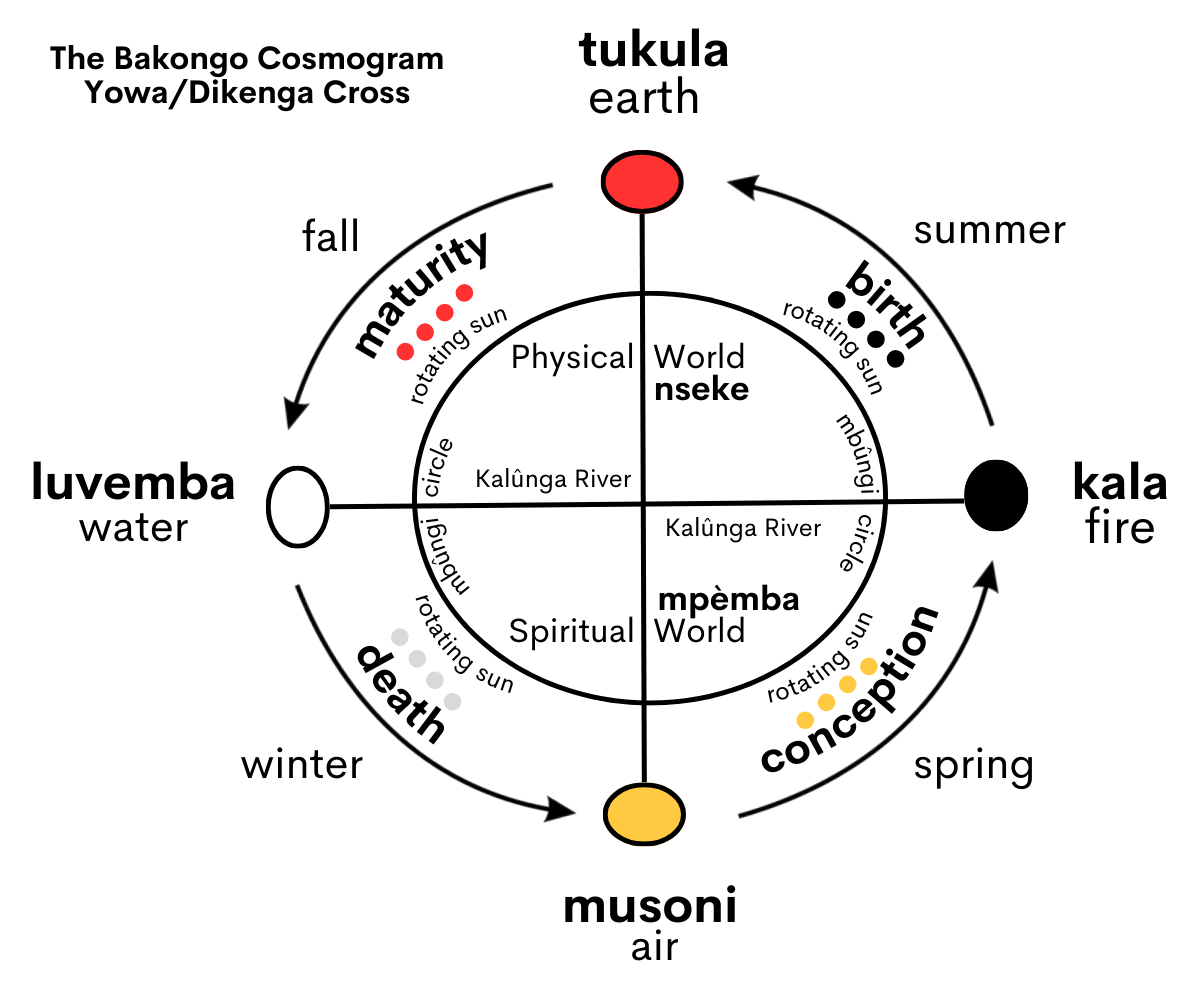
The Kongo cosmogram

In conjure, rootwork, and hoodoo, a form of African magical spirituality practiced by African Americans in the United States, the crossroads originates from the Kongo cosmogram in Central Africa. It represents the rising and setting of the sun, and the human life cycle of death and rebirth. The center of the crossroads is where the communication with spirits take place. During the transatlantic slave trade, the Kongo cosmogram was brought to the United States by African slaves. Archeologists unearthed representations of the Kongo cosmogram on slave plantations in South Carolina on clay pots made by enslaved Africans. The Kongo cosmogram is also called the Bakongo cosmogram and the "Yowa" cross. The Yowa cross (Kongo cosmogram) "Is a fork in the road (or even a forked branch) can allude to this crucially important symbol of passage and communication between worlds. The 'turn' in the path,' i.e., the crossroads, remains an indelible concept in the Kongo-Atlantic world, as the point of intersection between the ancestors and the living." "It is at the crossroads where many Africans believe one will witness the powers of God and emerge from the waters spiritually renewed."

Other African origins of the crossroads in Hoodoo are found in West Africa among the Yoruba people. For example, the Yoruba trickster deity called Eshu-Elegba resides at the crossroads, and the Yoruba people leave offerings for Eshu-Elegba at the crossroads. In Hoodoo, there is a spirit that resides at the crossroads to give offering for; however, the word Eshu-Elegba does not exist in Hoodoo because the names of African deities were lost during slavery. Folklorist Newbell Niles Puckett, recorded a number of crossroads rituals in Hoodoo practiced among African-Americans in the South and explained its meaning. Puckett wrote..."Possibly this custom of sacrificing at the crossroads is due to the idea that spirits, like men, travel the highways and would be more likely to hit upon the offering at the crossroads than elsewhere." African crossroads spirits were brought to the United States during the transatlantic slave trade. In the Vodou tradition, Papa Legba is the lwa of crossroads and a messenger to the spirit world.

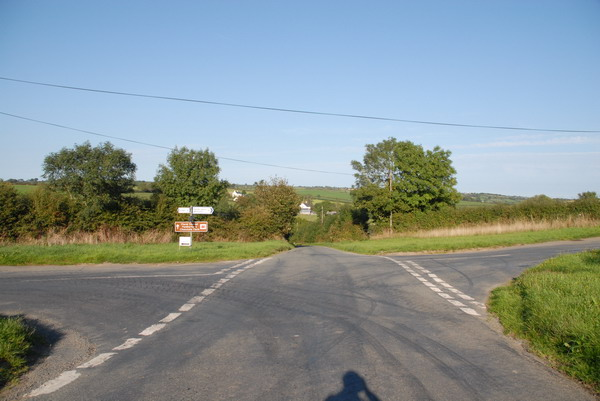
In Hoodoo crossroads are where two roads meet to form an X. The crossroads in Hoodoo originates from the Kongo cosmogram in Central Africa.

In Hoodoo, there has been a practice that is believed to be hoodoo in origin such as selling your soul to the devil at the crossroads in order to acquire facility at various manual and body skills, such as playing a musical instrument, throwing dice, or dancing. It is believed that one may attend upon a crossroads a certain number of times, either at midnight or just before dawn, and one will meet a "black man," whom some call the Devil, who will bestow upon one the desired skills. This practice is believed to have originated from an African American Blues musician by the name of Robert Johnson. In the oral history of hoodoo it is said that Robert Johnson became a skilled Blues musician after he sold his soul to the devil at the crossroads, and because of this, people began going to a crossroads at midnight to sell their soul to a devil to acquire a skill or to become better at a skill. The family of Robert Johnson have come forward and said this is not true. How Johnson became a skilled Blues musician was through training under Ike Zimmerman who was a blues guitarist. In an article from the National Blues Museum it reads... "In the case of Robert Johnson, many family members have come forward to dispel these rumors and have advocated that the truth be told about Robert Johnson. During the time that he was missing, Johnson returned home, where he ran into Ike Zimmerman. Zimmerman took Johnson under his wing, and from years of practicing, Johnson became the legendary Blues musician that we know today." Therefore, the idea one can sell their soul to the devil at the crossroads and acquire a skill may not be traditional in Hoodoo.

== Brazilian mythology ==
Crossroads are very important both in Brazilian mythology (related to the headless mule, the devil, the Besta Fera and the Brazilian version of the werewolf) and religions (as the favourite place for the manifestation of "left-hand" entities such as Exus and where to place offerings to the Orishas). Eshu and Legba derive from the same African deity, although they are viewed in markedly different manners among traditions. For example, Papa Legba is considered by Haitian Vodou practitioners to be closest to Saint Peter, although in Brazilian Quimbanda it is not uncommon to see Exu closely associated with demonic entities such as Lucifer, clad in Mephistophelean attire and bearing a trident.

== In modern fiction ==
=== Blues songs ===
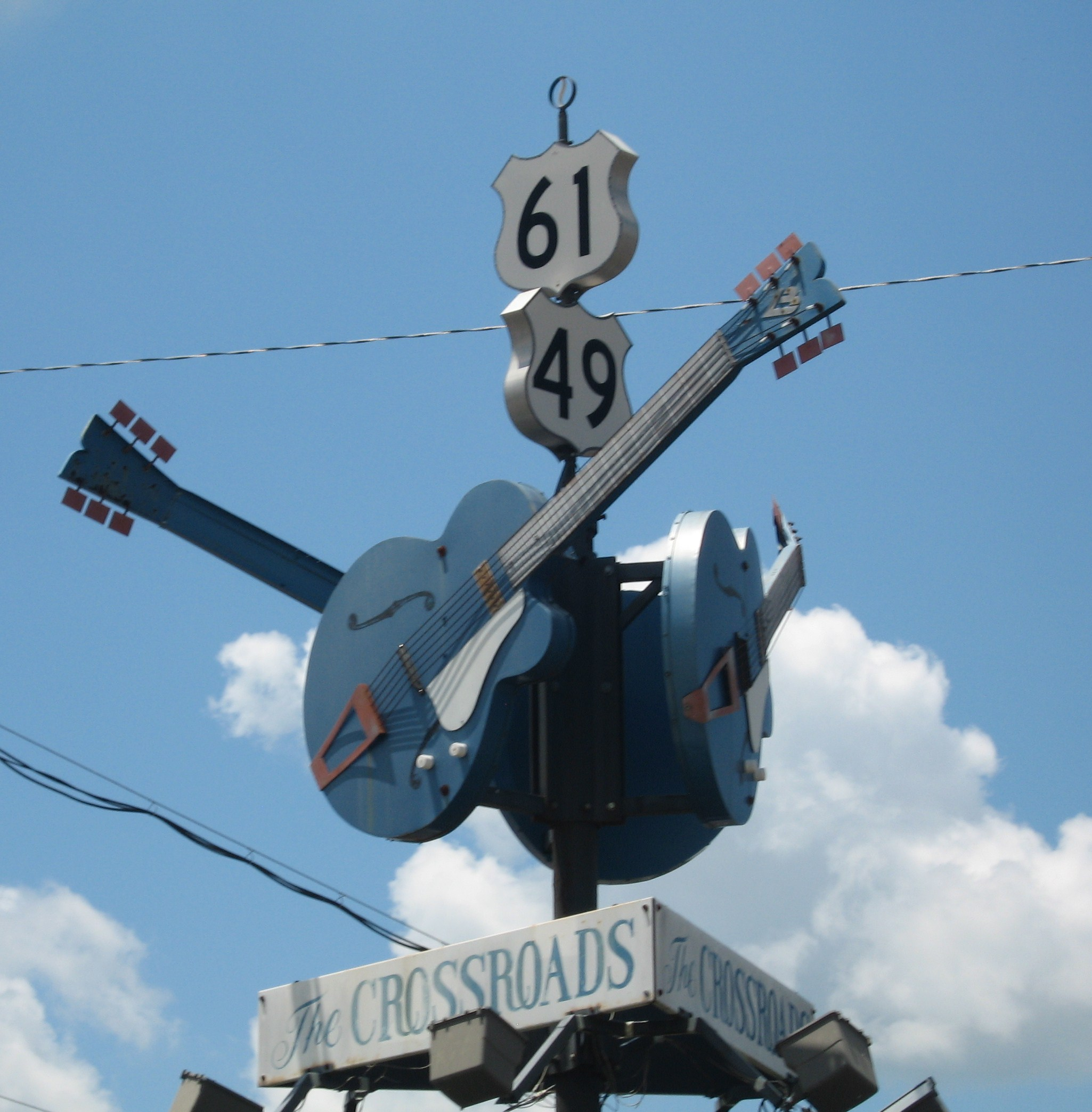
The crossroad of U.S. Route 61 and U.S. Route 49 in Clarksdale, Mississippi, one claimant to be where Robert Johnson supposedly sold his soul to the devil

Some 20th-century blues songs may be about making a deal with the devil at the crossroads. Many modern listeners believe that the premier song about soul-selling at a crossroads is "Cross Road Blues" by Robert Johnson. According to a legend, Johnson himself sold his soul at a crossroads in order to learn to play the guitar. This is chronicled in the Netflix documentary ReMastered: Devil at the Crossroads. However, the song's lyrics merely describe a man trying to hitchhike; the sense of foreboding has been interpreted as the singer's apprehension of finding himself, a young black man in the 1920s deep south, alone after dark and at the mercy of passing motorists.

== See also ==
- Liminal deities – Gods of boundaries or transitions, counterparts of Tutelary deities.
  - Liminality – Quality of ambiguity, disorientation, or state of transition
  - Wetlands and islands in Germanic paganism
  - Border – Geographic boundaries of political entity
  - Natural border – Boundaries that follow geographic features such as rivers or mountains
- Hecate – Greek goddess of magic and transitions
- Hermes – Ancient Greek deity
- Castor and Pollux – Greek mythical twins
- Limnoreia – Nereid in Greek mythology
- Janus – Roman god
- Papa Legba – Ginen in Haitian Vodou
- Boundary marker § Greece
  - Herma – Type of classical sculpture
  - Milestone – Numbered marker along a road or boundary
  - Runestone – Raised stone with a runic inscriptions
- Chaos (cosmogony) – Void state preceding creation
- Watchtower (magic) – Ceremonial magical tradition
- Classical compass winds – Historical wind directions
  - Cardinal direction – Directions of north, south, east and west
- Ceremonial magic – Variety of rituals of magic
- Magic circle – Protective device in ritual magic
  - Ouroboros – Symbolic serpent with its tail in its mouth
  - Möbius strip – Non-orientable surface with one edge
  - Mandala – Spiritual and ritual symbol in Hinduism, Jainism and Buddhism
- Otherworld – Indo-European concept of a supernatural realm
- Fairy ring#Oral tradition and folklore – Naturally occurring ring or arc of mushrooms
  - Fairyland – Mythical land of fairies in British folklore
- Ley line – Straight alignments between historic structures and landmarks
- Netherworld
- Limbo – Theological concept
- Purgatory – Religious belief of Christianity, primarily Catholicism
- Halloween – Annual celebration held on 31 October
- New Year – Beginning of the calendar year
  - New Year's Eve – Last day of the Gregorian year
  - Seasonal year – Time between successive recurrences of a seasonal event
  - Calendar year – Period of time
  - Lunar New Year – Beginning of a year in a lunar calendar
  - Solar New Year – Beginning of solar calendar year
  - Agricultural cycle – Annual cycle of crop growth/harvest activities
    - Academic year – Period of study in an educational institution
- Left-hand path and right-hand path – Dichotomy between two opposing approaches to magic
- Moral compass – Moral value system that provides guidance on the morality of choices
- Traffic sign – Signboard displaying information for road users
  - Direction, position, or indication sign – Type of road sign
- Intersection – Common elements of two or more sets
- Crossroads village
- Junction (traffic) – Location where traffic can change
- Road junction – Location where two or more roads meet
- Intersection (road) – Road junction where two or more roads either meet or cross at grade
