= Nausithoe =

Nausithoe may refer to:

- Nausithoe (cnidarian), a genus of jellyfish in the family Nausithoidae
- Nausithoe (mythology), a Nereid in Greek mythology
