= Nycheia =

Set index article on Greek mythology

In Greek mythology, Nycheia or Nychea (Ancient Greek: Νύχεια, lit. 'of the night' or 'nightly') may refer to two distinct nymphs:

- Nychea, a fountain-nymph on the island of Taphos. She was the daughter of the Titans Oceanus and Tethys, thus counted as one of the 3,000 Oceanids. As a personification of the said fountain, Nychea was said to provide sacred bathing for the nymphs and supply clean and restorative water to mortals. It was said that Pterelas, son of Ares, placed her on the island.
- Nycheia, another naiad associated with the myth of Hylas and the Argonauts. She inhabited the spring of Pegae near Lake Ascanius in Mysia (or Bithynia). When the Argo stopped in Mysia during the quest for the Golden Fleece, Heracles's young companion Hylas went to fetch water from her spring. Captivated by his beauty, Nycheia and her fellow nymphs (typically named Eunica and Malis) pulled Hylas beneath the water, causing him to vanish forever and prompting Heracles to abandon the expedition to search for him.
