= Dynamena =

Dynamena may refer to:

- Dynamena (hydrozoan), a genus of hydrozoans in the family Sertulariidae
- Dynamena, a genus of butterflies in the family Nymphalidae, synonym of Dynamine
- Dynamena, a genus of crustaceans in the family Sphaeromatidae, synonym of Dynamene
