= Phyllodoce =

Phyllodoce may refer to:

- Phyllodoce (mythology), a Nereid
- Phyllodoce (plant), a genus of plants which includes the mountainheaths or mountain heathers
- Phyllodoce (annelid), a genus of polychaete worms belonging to the family Phyllodocidae
- Phyllodoce, an invalid name for a genus of hydrozoans, Velella

== See also ==
- Phyllodoce floribunda or Acacia floribunda
- Phyllodoce stricta or Acacia stricta
- Phyllodoce verticillata or Acacia verticillata
