= Doryclus =

Greek mythological figure

In Greek mythology, Doryclus (Ancient Greek: Δόρυκλος, romanized: Dóruklos) may refer to the following personages:

- Doryclus, a Phoenician prince as son of King Phoenix and brother of Cilix and Phineus.
- Doryclus, a man from Tiryns who won the prize in boxing at the first Olympian games.
- Doryclus, a Lemnian living at the time when the Argonauts came to the island.
- Doryclus, an Indian warrior who fought against the army of Dionysus in the Indian War.
- Doryclus, the Trojan husband of Beroe.
- Doryclus, son of King Priam mentioned in Homer's Iliad, Hyginus' Fabulae and the Bibliotheca. His mother's name is unknown. He is ultimately killed by Ajax.
