= Watchtower (magic) =

Ceremonial magical tradition

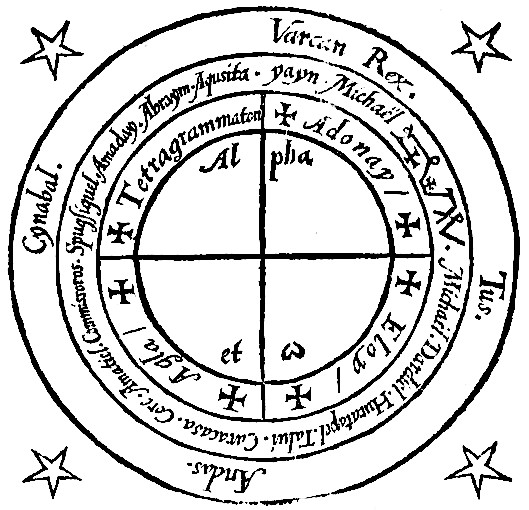
A Magic Circle based on the cardinal directions

A watchtower or guardian in ceremonial magical tradition is a tutelary spirit of one of the four cardinal points or quarters (East, South, West and North). In many magical traditions, they are understood to be Enochian angels or the Archangels Uriel, Raphael, Michael, and Gabriel. They are also variously associated in other traditions with each of the four classical elements (Earth, air, fire, and water) or stars (Fomalhaut, Aldebaran, Regulus, and Antares). Originating with the Enochian tradition of John Dee, a version of it was popularized by the Hermetic Order of the Golden Dawn, which became hugely influential in modern Western Esotericism, including Wicca. The watchtowers are invoked during the ritual of casting a magic circle.

== Origins in Enochian tradition ==
In the Enochian system of magic, brought to public attention by Dr. John Dee and his scryer Edward Kelley in the 16th century, was the first instance of Watchtower rituals being used. The rituals involved complex evocative designs. According to Dee's diaries, the two men summoned an angel, which Kelley saw in a small scrying crystal; Dee recorded the revelations which Kelley narrated to him. Among the surviving records of the Angelic Operations is A Book of Supplications and Invocations which "deals with the Invocation of the Angels who preside over the Four Quarters of the Terrestrial sphere." In Dee's original writings, the angels were not attributed to the quadrangles of the Great Table.

=== Western Hermeticism ===
==== Hermetic Order of the Golden Dawn and Ceremonial Magic ====
Dee's work was revived and expounded upon by the Hermetic Order of the Golden Dawn, primarily through the work of S.L. MacGregor Mathers. In the Golden Dawn magical system, the four Angelic or Enochian Tablets became the four watchtowers. Each watchtower was attributed to a direction and an element, by the Golden Dawn. At the core of the instructions was the Angelic Table: a grid of 25x27 squares, each square containing a letter. The Angelic Table is subdivided into four lesser grids for the four elements and the four directions, bound together by the cross-shaped Tablet of Union. They are used to call upon the aid of angels ruling over the four directions. The names of God and the angels to be used in the invocations are extracted from the tablets. The four tablets are often called the Enochian Tablets because the letters may be written in the Enochian alphabet also revealed to Dee and Kelley by the angel.

- The Great Eastern Quadrangle of Air
- The Great Western Quadrangle of Water
- The Great Northern Quadrangle of Earth
- The Great Southern Quadrangle of Fire

The Tablet of Union was rearranged to form a rectangle attributed to Spirit or Ether. The tablets were brightly colored; squares attributed to the elements were painted in the color of that element, with lettering in complementary colors.

- Air - yellow with violet letters
- Water - blue with orange letters
- Earth - black with green letters
- Fire - red with green letters

The use of complementary colors, called flashing colors in the Golden Dawn, means that the watchtowers belong to the class of talismans called flashing tablets. The flashing colors were supposed to draw energy from the atmosphere. The painted tablets were placed on the walls of the temple during some rituals to symbolize the four quarters. A favorite ritual in the Golden Dawn was the Opening by Watchtower. This is a preliminary ritual to purify space and call upon the guardians of the four quarters, which is the origin of casting the magic circle in Wicca. As part of the Opening by Watchtower, the practitioner uses the each elemental ceremonial weapon (air dagger, fire wand, water cup and Earth pentacle) to summon the angels of the quarters. In the South, for instance, the practitioner uses the Fire Wand to trace an invoking Fire Pentagram, then summons the angels using the three names of God found in the Fire Tablet:

OIP TEAA PEDOCE
In the names and letters of the Great Southern Quadrangle, I invoke ye, ye Angels of the Watch-tower of the South.

==== Wicca, Modern Witchcraft and Neopaganism ====
The watchtowers were among the Golden Dawn concepts introduced into Wicca by its founder Gerald Gardner. The complicated tablets and Enochian names were largely abandoned, but Wicca retained the watchtowers as "the four cardinal points, regarded as guardians of the Magic Circle." They are usually mentioned during the casting of the circle. In a conservative tradition such as Gardnerian or Alexandrian Wicca the invocation of the watchtowers begins in the East; the practitioner traces an invoking Earth Pentagram while saying;

Ye Lords of the Watchtowers of the East, ye Lords of Air; I do summon, stir and call you up, to witness our rites and to guard the Circle.

Many Wiccan circle-castings no longer mention the watchtowers by name. Another important development is experimentation with the attribution of elements to the directions, instead of adhering to the attributions used by the Golden Dawn and Gardnerian Wicca (North/Earth, East/air, South/fire, West/water). Many Wiccans perceive themselves as participants in an earth-based religion; they believe their practices should reflect their living experience of the local environment. Both the Golden Dawn and early Wicca were active in Great Britain; traditional attributions derived from the British climate may not appeal to or work for practitioners in other climates. A special instance of this problem is the circumstance of Wiccans living in the southern hemisphere, who tend to perceive the North, not the South, as the direction most characterized by fire and heat. Some Neopagans choose to follow the practices of a historical pagan group with whom they identify, or conform to local traditions; either choice may dictate a change of attributions.

== See also ==
- Cardinal direction – Directions of north, south, east and west
- Classical element – Earth, water, air, fire, and (later) aether
- Crossroads (folklore) – Places in folklore where the supernatural can happen
- Ceremonial magic – Variety of rituals of magic
- Magic circle – Protective device in ritual magic
- Mandala – Spiritual and ritual symbol in Hinduism, Jainism and Buddhism
- Table of correspondences – List of relations between magical objects
