= The Oceanids (The Naiads of the Sea) =

Painting by Gustave Doré

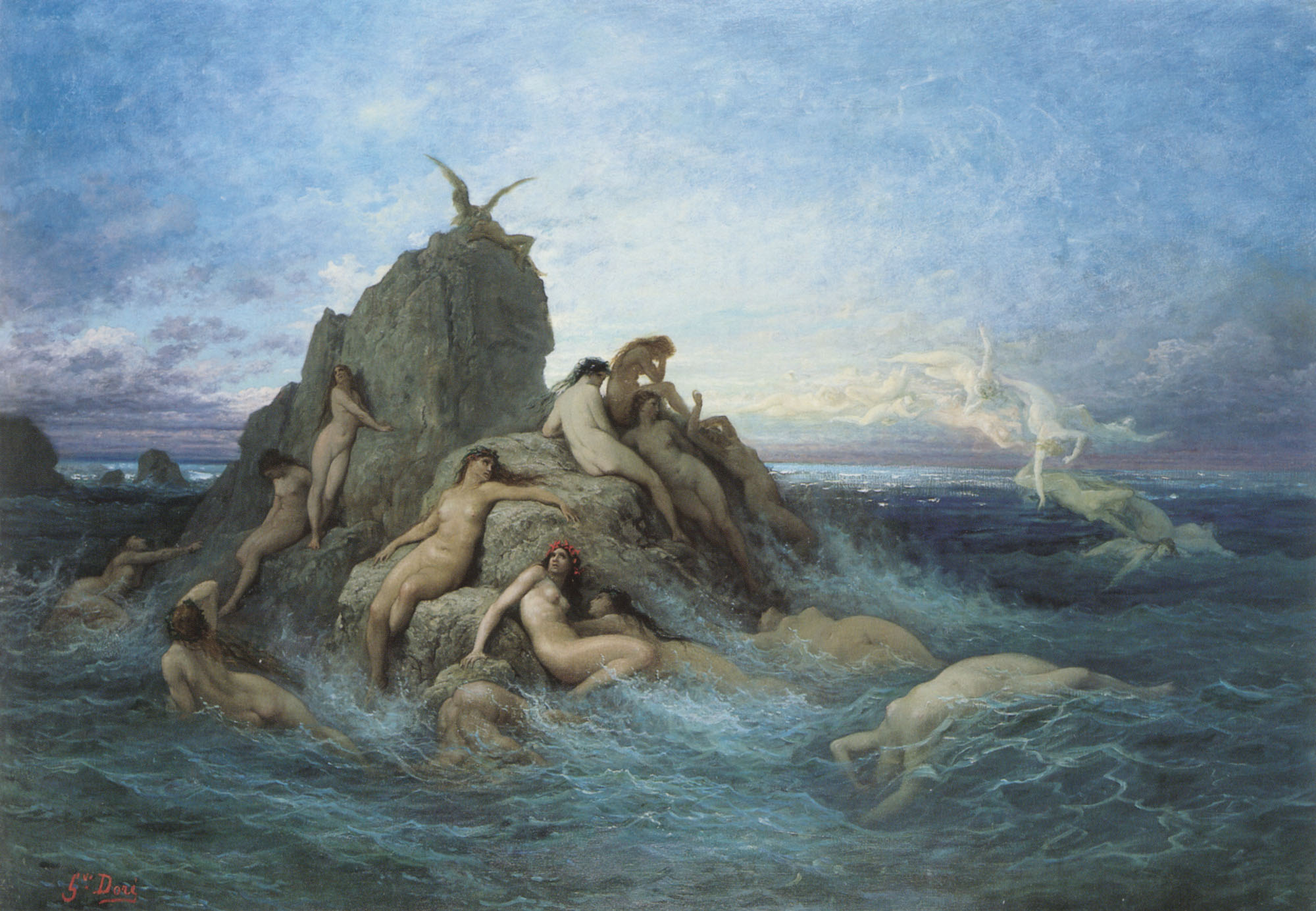
- Artist: Gustave Doré
- Year: c. 1860
- Medium: Oil on canvas
- Dimensions: 127 cm × 185.5 cm (50 in × 73.0 in)
- Location: Private collection

The Oceanids (The Naiads of the Sea) (French: Les Océanides (Les Naïades de la mer)) is a painting by Gustave Doré, dated to c. 1860. It depicts the Oceanids from Greek mythology with Prometheus chained to a rock in the background. The subject is from the ancient tragedy Prometheus Bound.

== Subject and composition ==
The subject of The Oceanids (The Naiads of the Sea) is from the ancient Greek tragedy Prometheus Bound, traditionally attributed to Aeschylus. The painting depicts a group of Oceanids—ocean nymphs from Greek mythology—gathered at a rock in the ocean. The nude Oceanids lie on the rock or in the water in contorted positions; a group of them circle in the sky on the right side of the picture. The water is foaming and there are dark clouds in the sky. In the background, the Titan Prometheus is chained to a cliff, a punishment given to him by Zeus after he stole fire from the gods and gave it to mankind.

== Reception ==
Peter Nahum and Sally Burgess complimented Gustave Doré's chiaroscuro in The Oceanids and wrote that the painting reveals his interest in how mythology relates to life and death; they described his work as crucial in the connection between romanticism and symbolism. Robert Rosenblum wrote that The Oceanids transfers the "menacing, primeval nature" and "apocalyptic mood" of Doré's prints to painted canvas. He compared it to Arnold Böcklin's paintings, placing it in "a genealogical table that would take us to de Chirico and beyond".

== Provenance ==
The Oceanids first belonged to Adèle Cassin (1831–1921), a wealthy woman who hosted dinners for distinguished men and sometimes invited Doré. It was sold at the Galerie Georges Petit in Paris in 1912. It has been in the private collection of the artist Dorothea Tanning.

== See also ==
- Prometheus Bound (Rubens)
- Prometheus Bound (Thomas Cole)
