= Nereids =

Greek Sea nymphs, daughters of Nereus

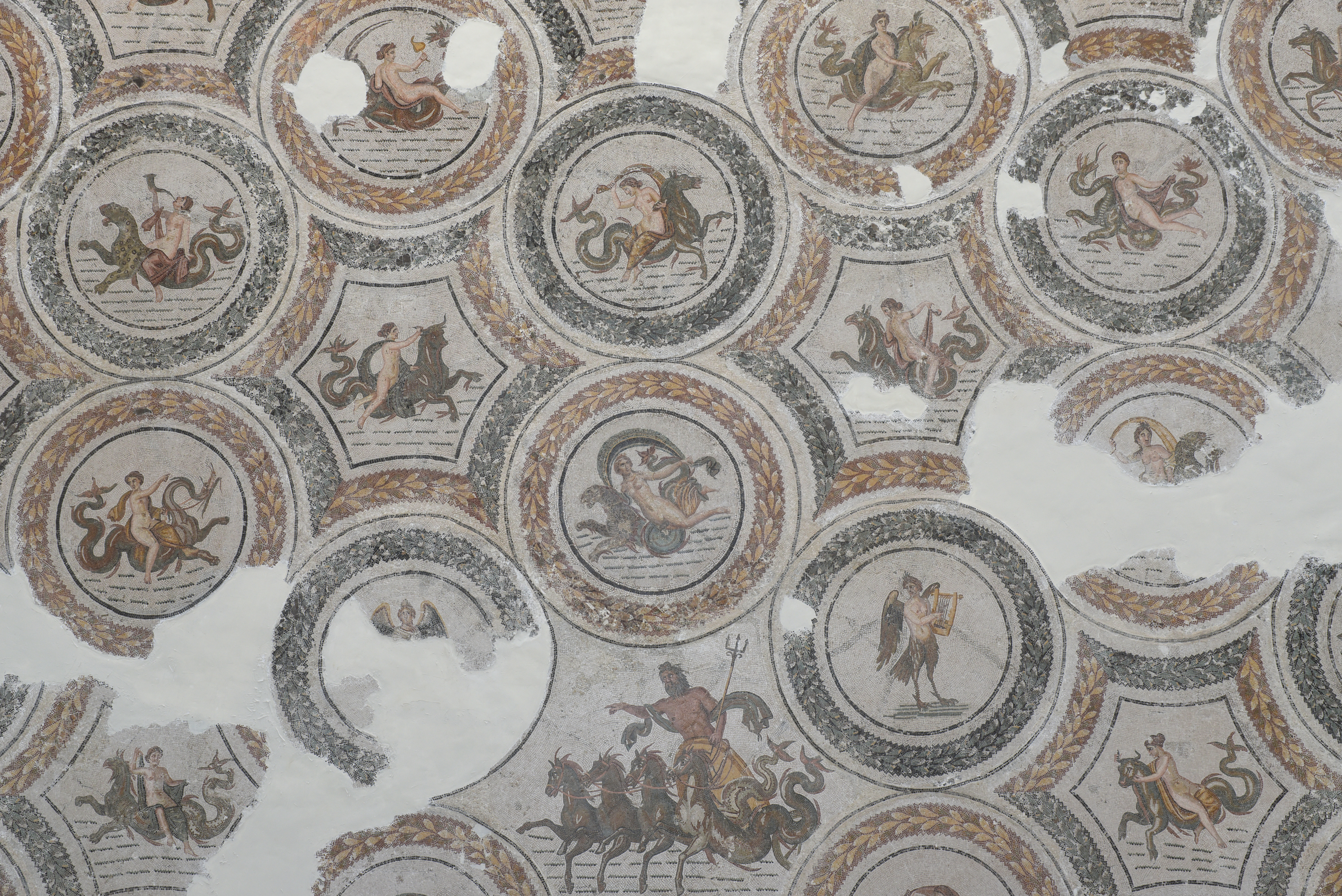
Nereids riding sea-creatures accompany Poseidon in his chariot on a 2nd century Roman mosaic in the National Museum of Bardo, Tunisia.

In Greek mythology, the Nereids or Nereides (/ˈnɪəriɪdz/ NEER-ee-idz; Ancient Greek: Νηρηΐδες, romanized: Nērēḯdes; sg. Νηρηΐς, Nērēḯs; Νημερτής was one of the 50) are sea nymphs (female spirits of sea waters), the 50 daughters of the 'Old Man of the Sea' Nereus and the Oceanid Doris, sisters to their brother Nerites. They often accompany Poseidon, the god of the sea, and can be friendly and helpful to sailors (such as the Argonauts in their search for the Golden Fleece).

== Name ==
It is not known whether the name Nereus was known to Homer or not, but the name of the Nereids is attested before it, and can be found in the Iliad. Since Nereus only has relevance as the father of the Nereids, it has been suggested that his name could actually be derived from that of his daughters; while the derivation of the Nereids from Nereus, as a patronymic, has also been suggested. According to Martin Litchfield West (1966), Nereus is much less important than his daughters, mentioning that Herodotus offered "the Nereids, not Nereus, as an example of a divine name not derived from Egypt".

The name of the Nereids has survived in modern Greek folklore as νεράιδες, neráides, 'fairies'.

== Mythology ==
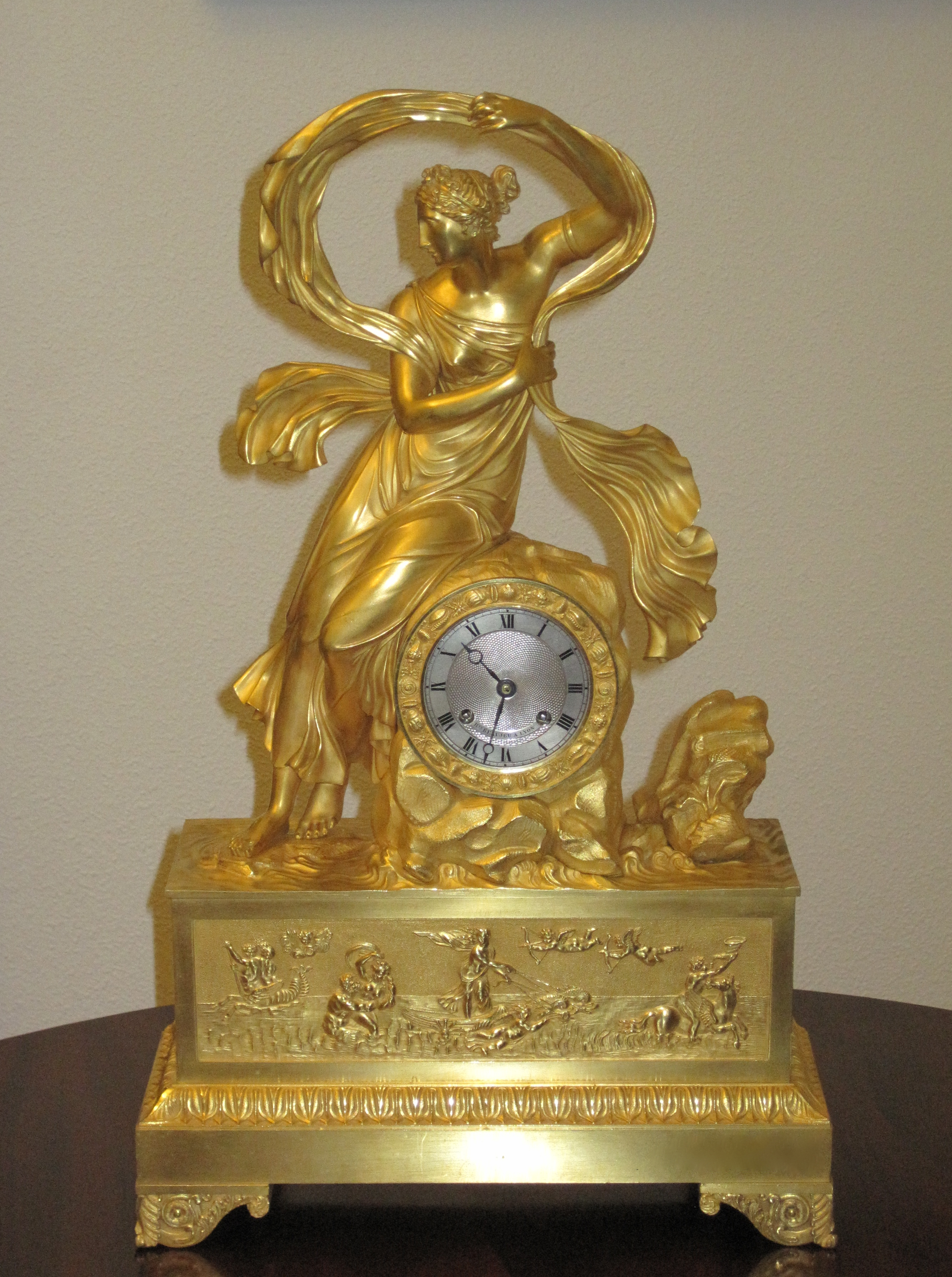
French Empire mantel clock (1822) depicting the nereid Galatea velificans

The Nereids symbolized everything that is beautiful and kind about the sea. Their melodious voices sang as they danced around their father. They are represented as beautiful women, crowned with branches of red coral and dressed in white silk robes trimmed with gold.

These nymphs are particularly associated with the Aegean Sea, where they dwelt with their father Nereus in the depths within a golden palace. The most notable of them are Thetis, wife of Peleus and mother of Achilles; Amphitrite, wife of Poseidon and mother of Triton; Galatea, the vain love interest of the Cyclops Polyphemus, and lastly, Psamathe who became the mother of Phocus by King Aeacus of Aegina, and Theoclymenus and Theonoe by Proteus, a sea-god or king of Egypt.

In Homer's Iliad XVIII, when Thetis cries out in sympathy for the grief of Achilles for the slain Patroclus, her sisters appear. Four of her siblings, Cymodoce, Thalia, Nesaea and Spio were also among the nymphs in the train of Cyrene. Later on, these four together with their other sisters Thetis, Melite and Panopea, were able to help the hero Aeneas and his crew during a storm.

In one account, Cassiopeia boasted that her daughter Andromeda was more beautiful than the Nereides, who were enraged by the claim. Poseidon, in sympathy for them, sent a flood and a sea monster to the land of the Aethiopians, demanding as well the sacrifice of the princess. These sea goddesses also were said to reveal to men the mysteries of Dionysus and Persephone.

== List of Nereids ==
This list is correlated from four sources: Homer's Iliad, Hesiod's Theogony, the Bibliotheca of Pseudo-Apollodorus and the Fabulae of Hyginus. Because of this, the total number of names goes beyond fifty.

No.	Name	Sources					Notes
No.	Name	Hom.	Hes.	Apol.	Hyg.	Others	Notes
1	Actaea	✓	✓	✓	✓		
2	Agaue	✓	✓	✓	✓		Appeared to Thetis when she cried out in sympathy for the grief of Achilles for Patroclus.
3	Amatheia	✓			✓		Appeared to Thetis when she cried out in sympathy for the grief of Achilles for Patroclus.
4	Amphinome	✓			✓		Feeds Poseidon's flock
5	Amphithoe	✓			✓		Appeared to Thetis when she cried out in sympathy for the grief of Achilles for Patroclus.
6	Amphitrite		✓	✓			Consort of Poseidon; The name of an Oceanid
7	Apseudes	✓			✓		
8	Arethusa				✓		
9	Asia				✓		The name of an Oceanid
10	Autonoe		✓	✓			Only mentioned by name
11	Beroe				✓		The name of an Oceanid
12	Callianassa	✓			✓		Appeared to Thetis when she cried out in sympathy for the grief of Achilles for Patroclus.
13	Callianeira	✓					Only mentioned by name on the Iliad.
14	Calypso			✓			The name of an Oceanid
15	Ceto			✓			The name of an Oceanid Only mentioned by name
16	Clio				✓		The name of an Oceanid
17	Clymene	✓			✓		The name of an Oceanid; appeared to Thetis when she cried out in sympathy for the grief of Achilles for Patroclus.
18	Cranto			✓			
19	Creneis				✓		
20	Cydippe				✓		In the train of Cyrene along with her other sisters
21	Cymatolege		✓				Only mentioned by name
22	Cymo		✓	✓			Only mentioned by name
23	Cymodoce	✓	✓		✓		
24	Cymothoe	✓	✓	✓	✓		Appeared to Thetis when she cried out in sympathy for the grief of Achilles for Patroclus.
25	Deiopea				✓		
26	Dero			✓			Only mentioned by name
27	Dexamene	✓			✓		Appeared to Thetis when she cried out in sympathy for the grief of Achilles for Patroclus.
28	Dione			✓			The name of an Oceanid
29	Doris	✓	✓		✓		The name of an Oceanid
30	Doto	✓	✓	✓	✓		
31	Drymo				✓		One of the nymphs in the train of Cyrene
32	Dynamene	✓	✓	✓	✓		
33	Eione		✓	✓			Only mentioned by name
34	Ephyra				✓		The name of an Oceanid
35	Erato		✓	✓			
36	Euagore		✓	✓			
37	Euarne		✓				
38	Eucrante		✓	✓			
39	Eudore		✓	✓			The name of an Oceanid
40	Eulimene		✓	✓			
41	Eumolpe			✓			Only mentioned by name
42	Eunice		✓	✓			
43	Eupompe		✓				Only mentioned by name
44	Eurydice				✓		
45	Galene		✓				
46	Galatea	✓	✓	✓	✓		
47	Glauce	✓	✓		✓		
48	Glauconome		✓	✓			Only mentioned by name
49	Halie	✓	✓	✓			
50	Halimede		✓	✓			
51	Hipponoe		✓	✓			
52	Hippothoe		✓	✓			Only mentioned by name
53	Iaera	✓			✓		Appeared to Thetis when she cried out in sympathy for the grief of Achilles for Patroclus.
54	Ianassa	✓			✓		Appeared to Thetis when she cried out in sympathy for the grief of Achilles for Patroclus.
55	Ianeira	✓		✓			The name of an Oceanid; appeared to Thetis when she cried out in sympathy for the grief of Achilles for Patroclus.
56	Ione			✓			
57	Iphianassa						Only mentioned by name
58	Laomedeia		✓				Only mentioned by name
59	Leiagore		✓				Only mentioned by name
60	Leucothoe				✓		
61	Ligea				✓		
62	Limnoreia	✓		✓	✓		
63	Lycorias				✓		
64	Lysianassa		✓	✓			
65	Maera	✓			✓		Appeared to Thetis when she cried out in sympathy for the grief of Achilles for Patroclus.
66	Melite	✓	✓	✓	✓		The name of an Oceanid
67	Menippe		✓				The name of an Oceanid
68	Nausithoe			✓			
69	Neaera						The name of an Oceanid
70	Nemertes	✓	✓		✓		
71	Neomeris			✓			
72	Nesaea	✓	✓	✓	✓		
73	Neso		✓				Only mentioned by name. Gives her name to Neso, one of Neptune's moons.
74	Opis				✓		
75	Oreithyia	✓			✓		Appeared to Thetis when she cried out in sympathy for the grief of Achilles for Patroclus.
76	Panope	✓		✓	✓		Appeared to Thetis when she cried out in sympathy for the grief of Achilles for Patroclus.
77	Panopea		✓		✓		Appeared to Thetis when she cried out in sympathy for the grief of Achilles for Patroclus.
78	Pasithea		✓				Only mentioned by name
79	Pherusa	✓	✓	✓	✓		Appeared to Thetis when she cried out in sympathy for the grief of Achilles for Patroclus.
80	Phyllodoce				✓		
81	Plexaure			✓			The name of an Oceanid
82	Ploto		✓				Only mentioned by name
83	Polynoe		✓				
84	Polynome			✓			Only mentioned by name
85	Pontomedusa			✓			Only mentioned by name
86	Pontoporeia		✓				Only mentioned by name
87	Pronoe		✓				Only mentioned by name
88	Proto	✓	✓	✓	✓		
89	Protomedeia		✓				Only mentioned by name
90	Psamathe		✓	✓			
91	Sao		✓	✓			Means 'the rescuer'; only mentioned by name
92	Speio	✓	✓	✓	✓		Appeared to Thetis when she cried out in sympathy for the grief of Achilles for Patroclus.
93	Thaleia	✓			✓		
94	Themisto		✓				Only mentioned by name
95	Thetis	✓	✓	✓			Mother of Achilles
96	Thoe	✓	✓		✓		The name of an Oceanid
97	Xantho				✓		The name of an Oceanid
Total		34	50	45	47		

== Iconography ==
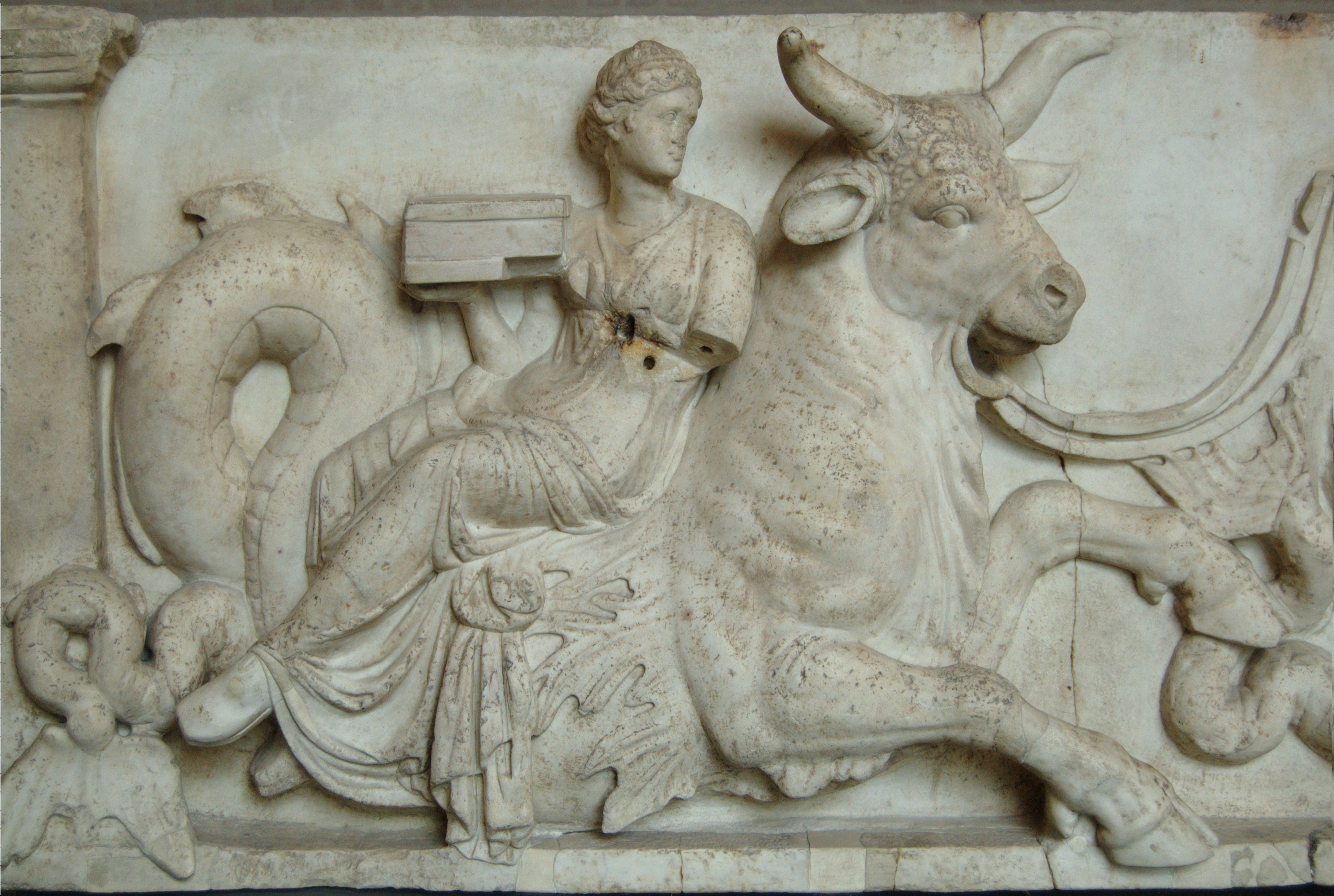
Nereid riding a sea-bull (latter 2nd century BC)

In ancient art the Nereides appear in the retinue of Poseidon, Amphitrite, Thetis and other sea-divinities. On black-figure Greek vases they appear fully clothed, such as on a Corinthian hydra (sixth century BCE; Paris) where they stand near the bier of Achilles. Later vase-paintings depict them nude or partially nude, mounted on dolphins, sea-horses or other marine creatures, and often grouped together with Tritons. They appear as such on Roman frescoes and sarcophagi. An Etruscan bronze cista from Palestrina depicts winged Nereides.

Famous is the Nereid Monument, a marble tomb from Xanthos (Lycia, Asia Minor), partially in the collection of the British Museum. At the top is a small temple surrounded by pillars between which Nereides stood. They were depicted in motion and with billowing, transparent clothes. The style is Attic-Ionian and dates to c. 400 BCE.

In the Renaissance and baroque periods the Nereid was frequently used to decorate fountains and garden monuments.

== Worship ==
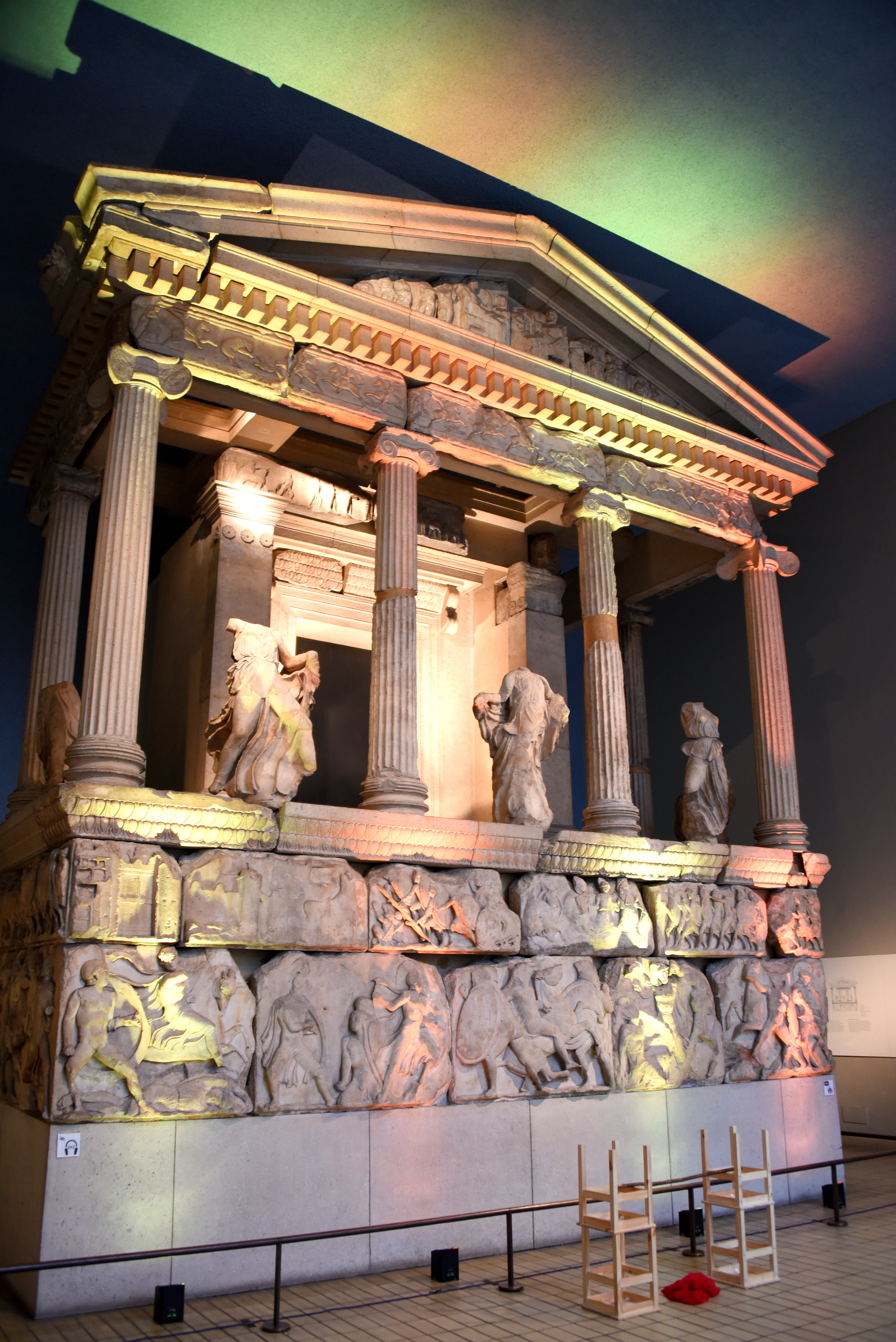
The Nereid Monument. From Xanthos (Lycia), modern-day Antalya Province, Turkey. 390–380 BC. Room 17, the British Museum, London

Nereides were worshiped in several parts of Greece, but more especially in seaport towns, such as Cardamyle, and on the Isthmus of Corinth. The epithets given them by the poets refer partly to their beauty and partly to their place of abode.

== Modern use ==
In modern Greek folklore, the term "nereid" (νεράιδα, neráida) has come to be used for all nymphs, fairies, or mermaids, not merely nymphs of the sea.

=== In modern folklore ===
The neraida appears in modern Greek folktales as a kind of supernatural wife, akin to the swan maiden, and gives its name to the homonymous type in the Catalogue of Greek Folktales: tale type ATU 400, "The Neraïda". She has been compared to the nymph, the female character of ancient Greek mythology. She is said to inhabit water sources (rivers and wells), similar to their ancient mythical counterpart, the Nereids (water nymphs). However, in modern speech, the term also encompasses fairy maidens from mountains and woodlands.

Greek folklorist Nicolaos Politis amassed a great amount of modern folkloric material regarding the neraida. In modern tales from Greek tellers, the neraides are said to dance at noon or at midnight; to have beautiful golden hair; to dress in white or rose garments and to appear wearing a veil on the head, or holding a handkerchief. Due to their beauty, young men are drawn to the neraides and steal their veils or kerchiefs to force their stay in the mortal realm. The women marry these men, but later regain their piece of clothing back and disappear forever. Greek scholar Anna Angeloupoulos terms this storyline The Stolen Scarf, one of four narratives involving the neraida. Also, this sequence is "the most frequent and stable introductory episode" in Greek variants of tale type 400.

In a tale from Greece, a human goatherd named Demetros, dances with ten fairies three nights, and in the third night, on a full moon, he dances with them and accidentally touches the handkerchief of Katena. Her companions abandon her to the mortal world and she becomes Demetros's wife, bearing him a daughter. For seven years, Demetros has hidden the handkerchief, until his wife Katena asks him for it. She takes the handkerchief and dances with it in a festival, taking the opportunity to return home and leave her mortal husband. Years later, their daughter follows her mother when she turns fifteen years old.

Another introductory episode of the Greek variants is one Angelopoulos dubbed The Sisters of Alexander the Great. This refers to a pseudo-historical or mythological account about Alexander the Great and a quest for a water of life that grants immortality. His sister (or sisters) drinks it instead of him, is thrown in the sea and becomes a gorgona, a half-human, half-fish creature with power over the storm who can sink boats and become birds. They approach ships to ask if Alexander still lives, and can only be appeased if answered positively. In one tale, a youth on a ship captures a gorgona three times (or three gorgones) and beats her until she promises not to threaten any more ships. The youth then arrives on a deserted island and sees three birds that become human (or flying maidens), and steals their garments. Richard MacGillivray Dawkins suggested that the modern gorgona was a merging of three mythological characters (the Sirens, the Gorgons, and the Scylla), and reported alternate tales where Alexander's sisters are replaced for his mother or a female lover. (Note: In another article, Dawkins claims the oldest version of the tale involves Alexander's daughter; later versions replacing her for his sister.)

=== Other uses ===
Nereid, a moon of the planet Neptune, is named after the Nereids, as is Nereid Lake in Antarctica.
