= Old Man of the Sea =

Mythological figure in Greek mythology

In Greek mythology, the Old Man of the Sea (Ancient Greek: ἅλιος γέρων, romanized: hálios gérōn; Greek: Γέροντας της Θάλασσας, romanized: Yérondas tis Thálassas) was a figure who could be identified as any of several water-gods, generally Nereus or Proteus, but also Triton, Pontus, Phorcys, or Glaucus, as well as the father of Semystra, or a descendant of the seer Leukias.

According to Pausanias' Description of Greece, the people of ancient Gythium called Nereus the Old Man of the Sea, after Homer's Iliad, which gives the same identification.

== Mythology ==
=== Homer ===
Illustration by Willy Pogany of Menelaus and his crew holding Proteus, from The Adventures of Odysseus and The Tales of Troy by Padraic Colum

In Homer's Iliad, the sea-god Nereus is identified as the Old Man of the Sea. Thetis is his daughter, and therefore Achilles is his grandson. After Thetis pledges to bring Achilles new armour from Hephaestus, she orders her sisters to visit the Old Man in his house and tell him about the situation in Troy regarding Patroclus, Achilles and Hector. Besides Thetis, his daughters include Glauce, Thaleia, Cymodoce, Nesaeë, Speio, Thoë, Halië, Cymothoë, Actaeë, Limnoreia, Melite, Iaera, Amphithoë, Agauë, Doto, Proto, Pherousa, Dynamene, Dexamene, Amphinome, Callianeira, Doris, Panope, Galateia, Nemertes, Apseudes, Callianassa, Clymene, Ianeira, Ianassa, Maera, Oreithyia and Amatheia.

In Book Four of Homer's Odyssey, the Old Man of the Sea is identified as the sea-god Proteus, father of Eidotheë. Menelaus recounts to Telemachus his journey home, and how he is obliged to seek the advice of the Old Man. The Old Man will answer truthfully any questions put to him when captured. Capturing him, however, entails holding on to him as he changes bewilderingly from one form to another in his attempts to break free from his interrogator. The dogged Menelaus succeeds in hanging on to the slippery god throughout all his transformations and, in the course of the following interrogation, is able to obtain an answer to his question as to whether Telemachus's father Odysseus is still alive.

In Book Thirteen of Homer's Odyssey, Phorcys is identified as Old Man of the Sea. It is said that there is a harbour in Ithaca named after him.

Book Twenty-Four of Homer's Odyssey addresses Achilles' funeral during the Trojan War and, like the Iliad, Nereus is identified as Old Man of the Sea. It is said that Thetis and the nymph daughters of the Old Man of the Sea rose from the sea and clad Thetis' son in deathless clothing.

=== Hesiod ===
In Hesiod's Theogony, Nereus is said to be the son of Pontus and Gaia, who earned the monikor "Old Man" because he is trusty, gentle, just, kind and does not forget customs. With Doris, he is said to have fathered Ploto, Eucrante, Sao, Amphitrite, Eudora, Thetis, Galene, Glauce, Cymothoë, Speo, Thoë, Halie, Pasithea, Erato, Eunice, Melite, Eulimene, Agaue, Doto, Proto, Pherusa, Dynamene, Nisaea, Actaea, Protomedea, Doris, Panopea, Galatea, Hippothoë, Hipponoë, Cymodoce, Cymatolege, Cymo, Eïone, Alimede, Glauconome, Pontoporea, Leagore, Euagore, Laomedea, Polynoë, Autonoë, Lysianassa, Euarne, Psamathe, Menippe, Neso, Eupompe, Themisto, Pronoë and Nemertes.

=== Dionysius of Byzantium ===
Dionysius of Byzantium lists a number of identifications for the identity of the Old Man of the Sea by different communities in Anaplous of the Bosporos. Some believed he was Nereus, some Phorcys, some Proteus, and some the father of Semystra. Others believed he was the guide of Jason and the Argonauts, who lead their escape through the Bosporus and the Symplegades, and was a descendant of the seer Leukias.

== Sinbad ==
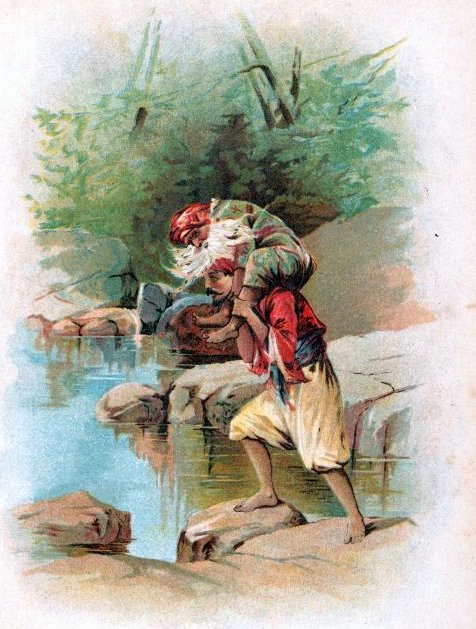
After being shipwrecked Sinbad the Sailor is enslaved by the "Old Man of the Sea".

Sinbad the Sailor encountered the monstrous Old Man of the Sea (Arabic: شَيْخ الْبَحْر, romanized: Šayḵ al-Baḥr) on his fifth voyage. The Old Man of the Sea in the Sinbad tales was said to trick a traveller into letting him ride on his shoulders while the traveller transported him across a stream. However, the Old Man would then not release his grip, forcing his victim to transport him wherever he pleased and allowing his victim little rest. The Old Man's victims all eventually died of this miserable treatment, with the Old Man either eating them or else robbing them. Sinbad, however, after getting the Old Man drunk with wine, was able to shake him off and kill him.

== References in poetry ==
The Old Man of the Sea is alluded to in Edwin Arlington Robinson's book-length narrative poem King Jasper. In part 3 of the poem, King Jasper dreams of his deceased friend Hebron (whom Jasper betrayed) riding on his back. "You cannot fall yet, and I'm riding nicely," Hebron tells Jasper. "If only we might have the sight of water, / We'd say that I'm the Old Man of the Sea, / And you Sinbad the Sailor." Hebron then turns to gold (a symbol of Jasper's motivation for betraying him) and coaxes Jasper to leap across a ravine with the heavy, golden Hebron on his back.

The Old Man of the Sea also figures in the work of West Indian poet Derek Walcott. In a 1965 paper, "The Figure of Crusoe", writing about the poem "Crusoe's Journal", Walcott notes:

It is not the Crusoe you recognize. I have compared him to Proteus, that mythological figure who changes shapes according to what we need him to be. Perhaps my mythology is wrong. I am, however, also summoning, in the combination of Crusoe and Proteus, the Old Man of the Sea with whom a mythological hero wrestled. The commercial Crusoe gives his name to our brochures and hotels. He has become the property of the Trinidad and Tobago Tourist board, and although it is the same symbol that I use, you must allow me to make him various, contradictory and as changeable as the Old Man of the Sea. ... My Crusoe, then, is Adam. Christopher Columbus, God, a missionary, a beachcomber, and his interpreter, Daniel Defoe.

Referencing the figures of Adam, Christofer (Columbus) and Friday in succession, the poem's narrator remarks, "All shapes, all objects multiplied from his,/our ocean's Proteus;/in childhood, his derelict's old age/was like a god's."
