= Doris (Oceanid) =

Goddess in Greek mythology

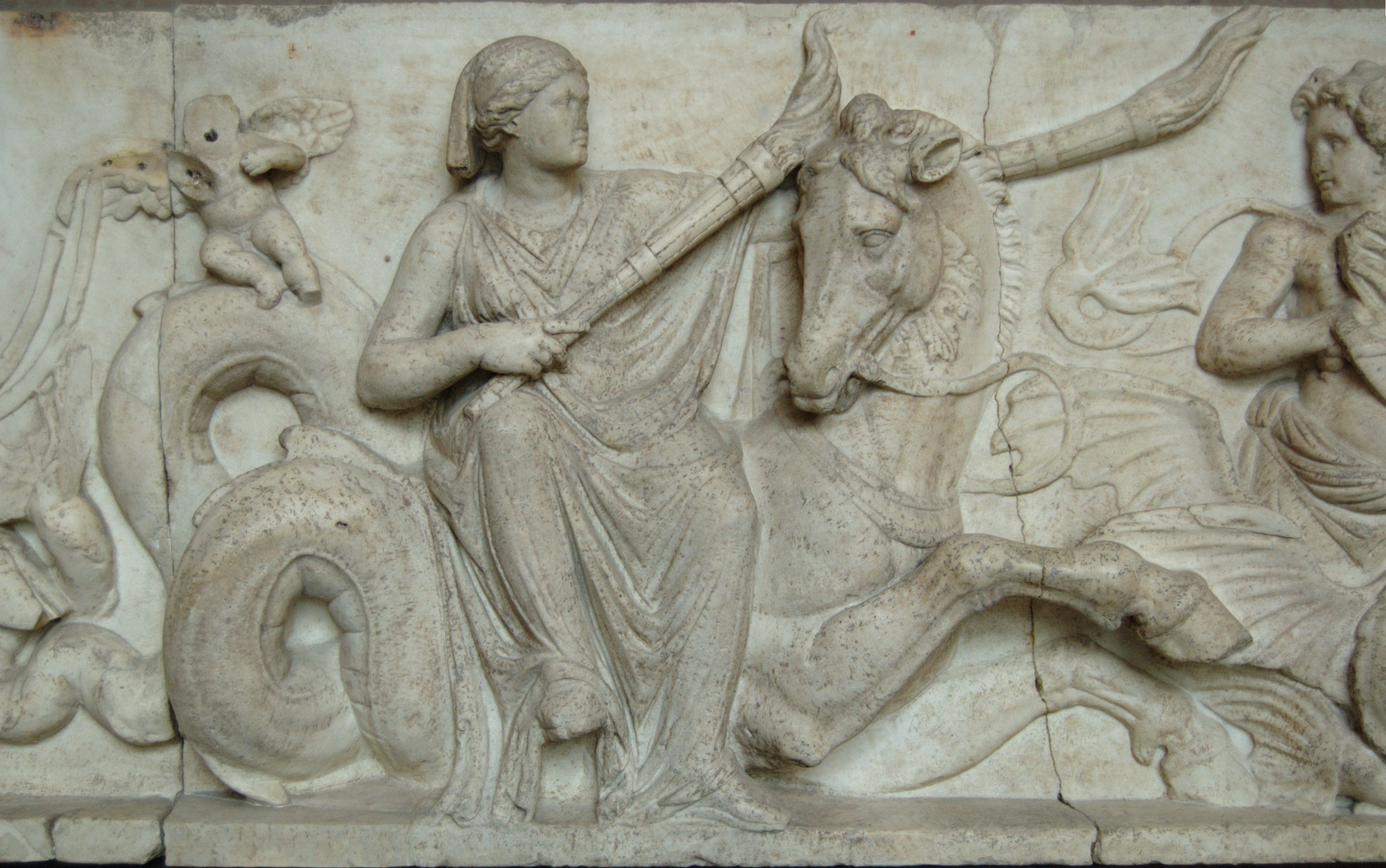
Doris riding a hippocampus and carrying two torches to light the wedding cortege of Poseidon and Amphitrite, base of a sculpted group, end 2nd century BC, Munich Glyptothek museum (Inv. 239).

Doris (/ˈdoʊrɪs/; Ancient Greek: Δωρίς, romanized: Dōrís, lit. 'bounty'), in Greek mythology, was a sea goddess. She was one of the 3,000 Oceanids, daughters of the Titans Oceanus and Tethys.

== Etymology ==
The name Doris is derived from the noun for a gift, δῶρον, which is derived from Proto-Indo-European *déh₃rom of the same meaning.

== Function ==
When not associated with a god, Doris represented the fertility of the ocean, goddess of the rich fishing-grounds found at the mouths of rivers where fresh water mingled with the brine.

== Family ==
As an Oceanid, Doris is sister to the three thousand river gods. By her husband Nereus she is the mother of the fifty Nereids, including Thetis, Amphitrite and Galatea. According to Aelian, she and Nereus also had a son, Nerites.

== Namesake ==
Doris Cove in Antarctica is named after the goddess.

== See also ==
- 48 Doris
