= Nereus =

Ancient Greek sea god and father of the Nereids

- Member of Sea Gods
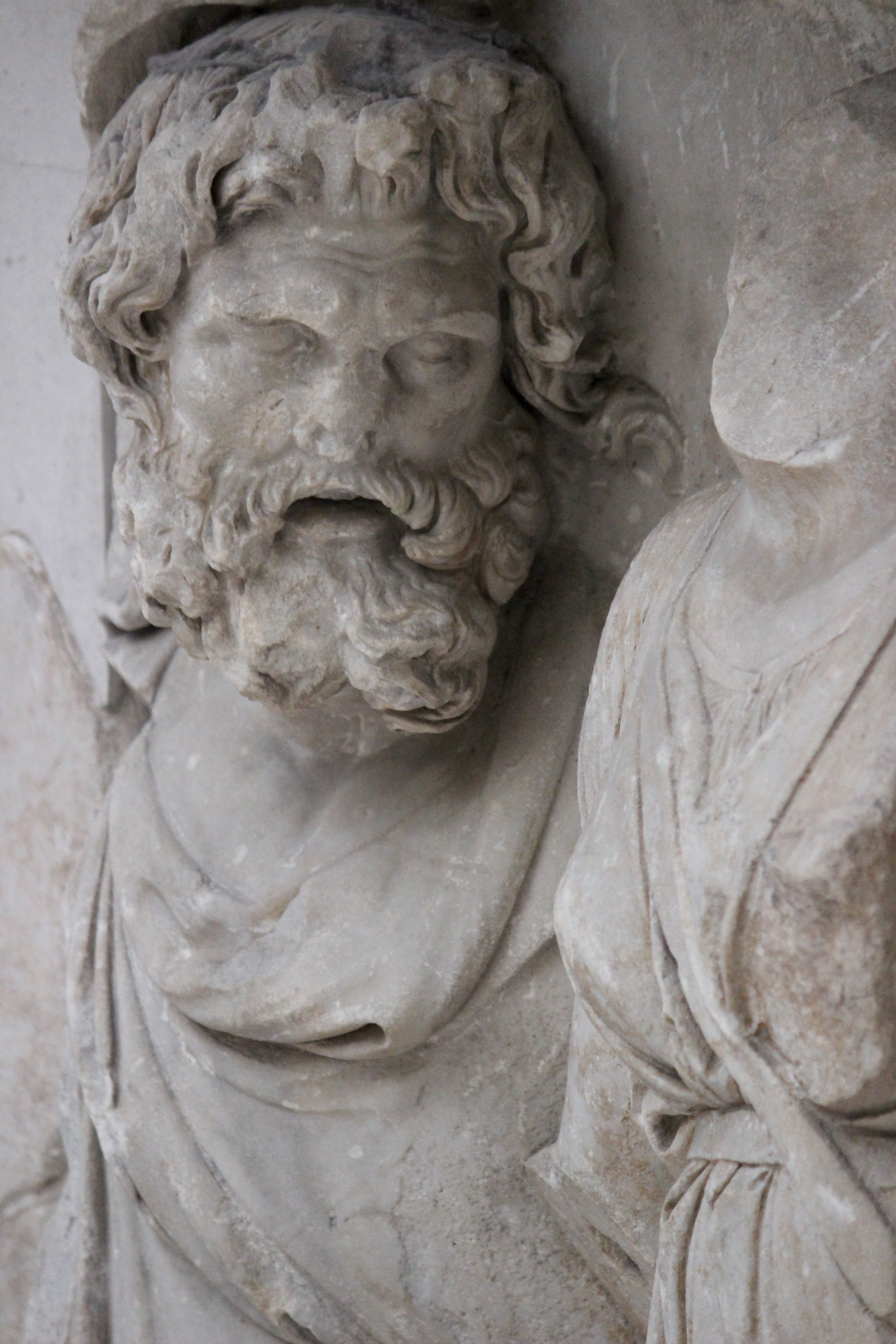
- Nereus in a frieze of the Pergamon Altar (Berlin).
- Other names: Old Man of the Sea
- Abode: Aegean Sea

Genealogy
- Parents: Pontus and Gaia
- Siblings: Thaumas; Phorcys; Ceto; Eurybia
- Consort: Doris
- Offspring: Nerites; the Nereids

In Greek mythology, Nereus (/ˈnɪəriəs/ NEER-ee-əs; Ancient Greek: Νηρεύς, romanized: Nēreús) was the eldest son of Pontus (the Sea) and Gaia (the Earth). Nereus and Doris became the parents of 50 daughters (the Nereids) and a son (Nerites), with whom Nereus lived in the Aegean Sea.

== Name ==
The name Nereus is absent from Homer's epics; the god's name in the Iliad is the descriptive ἅλιος γέρων 'Old Man of the Sea', and in the Odyssey the combination of ἅλιος γέρων and Πρωτεύς 'Proteus'. Besides Nereus and Proteus, the descriptive "Old Man of the Sea" was used for other water deities in Greek mythology who share several traits, among them Phorcys, Glaucus, and perhaps Triton. It is suggested that the "Old Man of the Sea" had at one time played a cosmogonic role comparable to that of Oceanus and could have received different names in different places. It is not known whether the name Nereus was known to Homer or not, but the name of the Nereids is attested before it and can be found in the Iliad. Since Nereus only has relevance as the father of the Nereids, it has been suggested that his name could actually be derived from that of his daughters; while the derivation of the Nereids from Nereus, as a patronymic, has also been suggested. According to Martin Litchfield West (1966), Nereus is much less important than his daughters, mentioning that Herodotus offered "the Nereids, not Nereus, as an example of a divine name not derived from Egypt".

In Hesiod's Theogony, where the name was first attested, Nereus is presented in immediate juxtaposition to Eris, and this extends to their children. First of all, there exists a feminine-masculine opposition. Eris is the youngest child of Nyx and the only one for whom children are mentioned, while Nereus is Pontus' oldest son and, again, is granted the most attention. Hesiod chooses verbs and adjectives to describe Nereus in juxtaposition to Eris' children, such as ἀ-ψευδέα 'does-not-lie' and ἀ-ληθέα 'does-not-forget', as opposed to Ψευδέα 'Lies' and Λήθη 'Forgetfulness'. This has prompted scholars to propose a derivation from Ἔρις Eris 'Discord' with the negative prefix νη‑ ne‑ added to it; namely, Ne-Eris 'Not-Discord', which evolved to Νηρεύς (< νη-ερ(ι)-ευς). Furthermore, Hesiod plays with the verbal likeness between Nereus and his last daughter Νημερτής Nemertes 'Unerring', whose name also bears the negative prefix νη‑.

Another possible etymology could be from νηρόν, nerón '(fresh) water or fish', which is a contraction of the Greek adjective νεαρός, nearós 'new, fresh, young'. It is commonly believed that the contraction of νεαρός to νηρός happened later than Hesiod; however, the contraction of ε and α to η is quite old and widespread over many Greek dialects.

The name could be related to the Hesychian glosses νηρίδας 'hollow rocks' or νηρόν 'low-lying'. Robert S. P. Beekes (2010) favors a Pre-Greek (pre-Indo-European) origin, as is suggested by the suffix ‑εύς, ‑eús. Another view is that of Apostolos Athanassakis (1983), who suggested an Illyrian origin for the name and compared it to the Albanian word njeri 'man'.

According to August Fick (1890), the closest Indo-European relative of Nereus and Nereids is the Lithuanian verb nérti 'to dive'; moreover, the Lithuanian noun nėrõvė 'mermaid' has been associated with the Nereids. Papachristophorou (1998) supported a derivation from the aforementioned Lithuanian verb, citing Pierre Chantraine (1968), while Tsantsanoglou (2015) considered the relation plausible.

The name of the Nereids has survived in modern Greek folklore as νεράιδες, neráides 'fairies'.

== Mythology ==
In the Iliad, the Old Man of the Sea is the father of Nereids, though Nereus is not directly named. He was never more manifestly the Old Man of the Sea than when he was described, like Proteus, as a shapeshifter with the power of prophecy, who would aid heroes such as Heracles who managed to catch him even as he changed shapes. Nereus and Proteus (the "first") seem to be two manifestations of the god of the sea who was supplanted by Poseidon when Zeus overthrew Cronus.

The earliest poet to link Nereus with the labours of Heracles was Pherekydes, according to a scholion on Apollonius of Rhodes.

During the course of the 5th century BC, Nereus was gradually replaced by Triton, who does not appear in Homer, in the imagery of the struggle between Heracles and the sea-god who had to be restrained in order to deliver his information that was employed by the vase-painters, independent of any literary testimony.

In a late appearance, according to a fragmentary papyrus, Alexander the Great paused at the Syrian seashore before the climacteric battle of Issus (333 BC), and resorted to prayers, "calling on Thetis, Nereus and the Nereids, nymphs of the sea, and invoking Poseidon the sea-god, for whom he ordered a four-horse chariot to be cast into the waves."

Nereus was known for his truthfulness and virtue:

But Pontos, the great sea, was father of truthful Nereus who tells no lies, eldest of his sons. They call him the Old Gentleman because he is trustworthy, and gentle, and never forgetful of what is right, but the thoughts of his mind are mild and righteous.

The Attic vase-painters showed the draped torso of Nereus issuing from a long coiling scaly fishlike tail. Bearded Nereus generally wields a staff of authority. He was also shown in scenes depicting the flight of the Nereides as Peleus wrestled their sister Thetis.

In Aelian's natural history, written in the early third century, Nereus was also the father of a watery consort of Aphrodite and lover of Poseidon named Nerites who was transformed into "a shellfish with a spiral shell, small in size but of surpassing beauty."

Nereus was father to Thetis, one of the Nereids, who in turn was mother to the great Greek hero Achilles, and Amphitrite, who married Poseidon.
