= Oceanids =

Nymph daughters of Oceanus

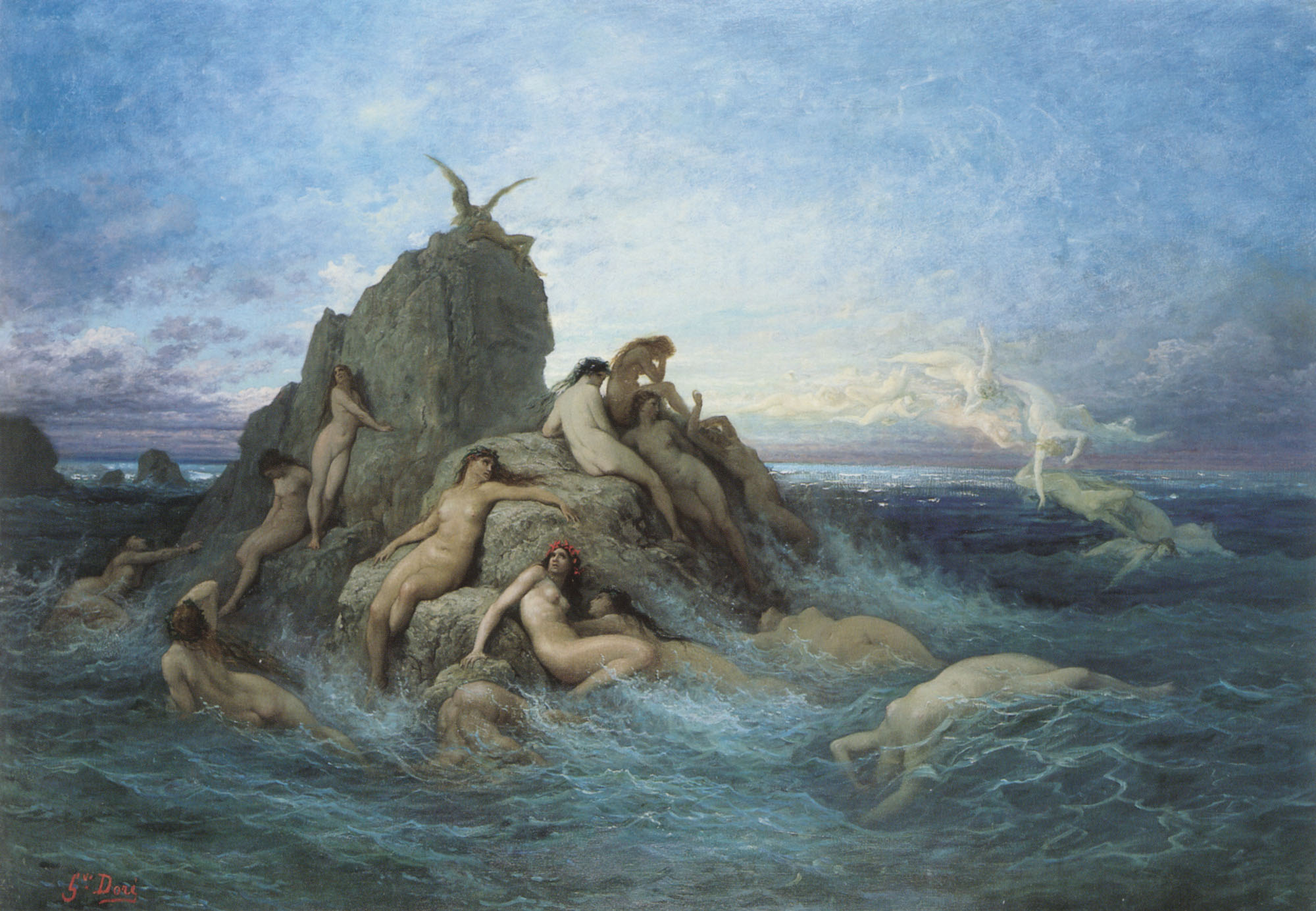
Les Océanides, Gustave Doré (c. 1860)

In Greek mythology, the Oceanids or Oceanides (/oʊˈsiːənɪdz, ˈoʊʃənɪdz/ oh-SEE-ə-nidz, OH-shə-nidz; Ancient Greek: Ὠκεανίδες, romanized: Ōkeanídes, sing. Ὠκεανίς, Ōkeanís) are the nymphs who were the three thousand (a number interpreted as meaning "innumerable") daughters of the Titans Oceanus and Tethys.

== Description and function ==
The Oceanids' father Oceanus was the great primordial world-encircling river, their mother Tethys was a sea goddess, and their brothers the river gods (also three thousand in number) were the personifications of the great rivers of the world. Like the rest of their family, the Oceanid nymphs were associated with water, as the personification of springs. Hesiod says they are "dispersed far and wide" and everywhere "serve the earth and the deep waters", while in Apollonius of Rhodes' Argonautica, the Argonauts, stranded in the desert of Libya, beg the "nymphs, sacred of the race of Oceanus" to show them "some spring of water from the rock or some sacred flow gushing from the earth".

The Oceanids are not easily categorized, nor confined to any single function, not even necessarily associated with water. Though most nymphs were considered to be minor deities, many Oceanids were significant figures. Metis, the personification of intelligence, was Zeus' first wife, whom Zeus impregnated with Athena and then swallowed. The Oceanid Doris, like her mother Tethys, was an important sea-goddess. While their brothers, the river gods, were the usual personifications of major rivers, Styx (according to Hesiod the eldest and most important Oceanid) was also the personification of a major river, the underworld's river Styx. And some, like Europa, and Asia, seem associated with areas of land rather than water.

The Oceanids were also responsible for keeping watch over the young. According to Hesiod, who described them as "neat-ankled daughters of Ocean ... children who are glorious among goddesses", they are "a holy company of daughters who with the lord Apollo and the Rivers have youths in their keeping—to this charge Zeus appointed them".

Like Metis, the Oceanids also functioned as the wives (or lovers) of many gods, and the mothers, by these gods, of many other gods and goddesses. Doris was the wife of the sea-god Nereus, and the mother of the fifty sea nymphs, the Nereids. Styx was the wife of the Titan Pallas, and the mother of Zelus, Nike, Kratos, and Bia. Eurynome, Zeus' third wife, was the mother of the Charites. Clymene was the wife of the Titan Iapetus, and mother of Atlas, Menoetius, Prometheus, and Epimetheus. Electra was the wife of the sea god Thaumas and the mother of Iris and the Harpies. Other notable Oceanids include: Perseis, wife of the Titan sun god Helios and mother of Circe, and Aeetes the king of Colchis; Idyia, wife of Aeetes and mother of Medea; and Callirhoe, the wife of Chrysaor and mother of Geryon.

Sailors routinely honored and entreated the Oceanids, dedicating prayers, libations, and sacrifices to them. Appeals to them were made to protect seafarers from storms and other nautical hazards. Before they began their legendary voyage to Colchis in search of the Golden Fleece, the Argonauts made an offering of flour, honey, and sea to the ocean deities, sacrificed bulls to them, and entreated their protection from the dangers of their journey. They were also recorded as the companions of Persephone when she was abducted by Hades.

The goddess Artemis requested that sixty Oceanids of nine years be made her personal choir, to serve her as her personal handmaids and remain virgins.

== Names ==
Hesiod gives the name of 41 Oceanids, with other ancient sources providing many more. While some were important figures, most were not. Some were perhaps the names of actual springs, others merely poetic inventions. Some names, consistent with the Oceanids' charge of having "youths in their keeping", represent things which parents might hope to be bestowed upon their children: Plouto ("Wealth"), Tyche ("Good Fortune"), Idyia ("Knowing"), and Metis ("Wisdom"). Others appear to be geographical eponyms, such as Europa, Asia, Ephyra (Corinth), and Rhodos (Rhodes).

Several of the names of Oceanids were also among the names given to the Nereids.

== The arts ==
=== Paintings ===
As a group, the Oceanids form the chorus of the ancient Greek tragedy Prometheus Bound, coming up from their cave beneath the ground to console the chained Titan Prometheus. There they are described as moving with haste, in contrast to the hero's immobility. In his new interpretation of the Greek play's continuation, Prometheus Unbound (1820), Percy Bysshe Shelley included three Oceanids among his characters. Ione and Panthea accompany the suffering hero and are joined by his lover, Asia. The setting is in the Caucasus mountains and Shelley describes these characters as winged beings.

Two 19th-century artists depicted the mourning of the Oceanids about the rock on which Prometheus is chained, which was interpreted in this case as rising mid-ocean. The first of these was La Désolation des Océanides (1850) by Henri Lehmann, presently in the Musée départemental de Gap. The other, titled simply The Oceanids (The Naiads of the Sea) (1869), was by Gustave Doré. Lehmann's painting was savaged as lacking in Classical decorum by the critics of the Salon at which it was exhibited; in particular, the nymphs clustered about the sea-girt rock on which Prometheus is chained were compared to "a troop of young seals clambering onshore". Doré's naiads, engaged in the same occupation, were eventually identified more elegantly by Dorothea Tanning as akin to mermaids.

Later artists reinterpreted the nymphs tumbling among the waves, as depicted by both painters, in order to portray individual Oceanids as female manifestations of sea foam. Examples include Wilhelm Trübner's study of a female form in a frothy wave (Weiblicher Akt im Schaum einer Welle), which he titled "Oceanide" (1872); and William-Adolphe Bouguereau's Océanide (1904), portraying a nude extended on the shore in the track of the incoming tide, of which a more sympathetic critic of the 1905 Salon noted how the artist delights in comparing a lissom body to the sea's undulations. Manchester-born Annie Swynnerton's "Oceanid" emerging from the sea was painted the same year and is presently in the Cartwright Hall Art Gallery, Bradford.

=== Sculptures ===
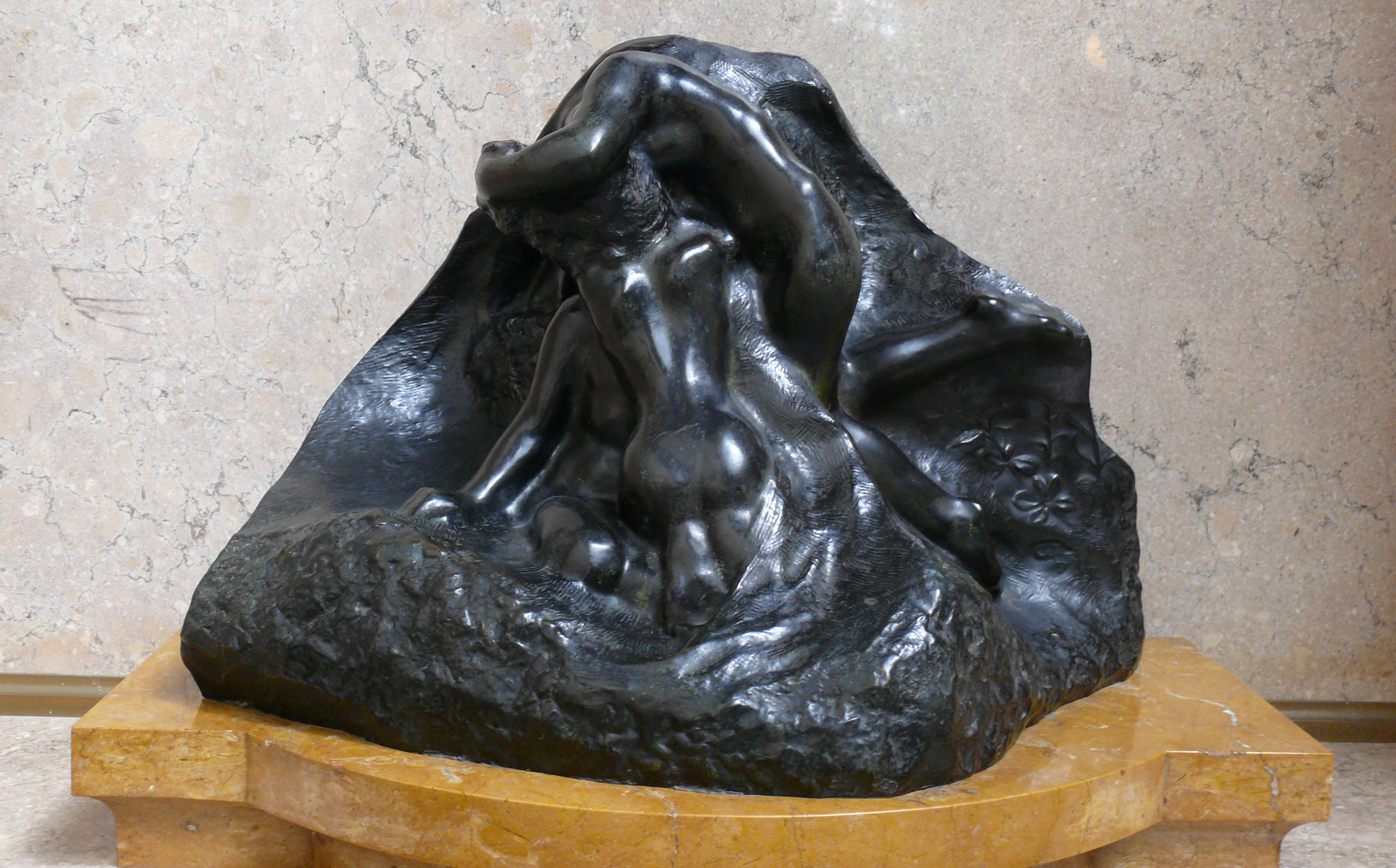
The 1925 bronze copy of the Océanides in the Rodin Museum, Philadelphia

Sculptures of the subject are comparable to the paintings in some respects. In Johann Eduard Müller's marble statue of "Prometheus and the Oceanides" (1868–79), the nymphs scramble upwards in an attempt to alleviate the Titan's suffering, as they do in Lehmann's canvas. The smaller-scale Océanides (1905) of Auguste Rodin cluster like waves breaking at the base of a rock, their "supple feminine forms emerging from rough marble". A larger scale version of the sculpture was finally cast in bronze in 1925 and is in Philadelphia's Rodin Museum.

The fountain at York House, Twickenham concentrates on a purely marine theme and is of much wider extent. This gave the turn of the century sculptor, Oscar Spalmach (1864–1917), the opportunity to drape his white marble Oceanids about the rocks of the cascade in a variety of painterly poses. Henri Laurens created a bronze Océanide in 1933 which was equally suited for outdoor display. Largely abstract in conception, the sea connection is suggested by the shell-like wave shape that upholds one of her legs. Several copies of the sculpture exist, displayed in the Middelheim Open Air Sculpture Museum outside Antwerp, the German Staatliche Kunsthalle Karlsruhe and the Centre Pompidou in Paris. And in Australia Helen Leete went on to create an equally abstracted group of "Oceanides" in 1997 to mount on the seaside rocks off Manly, New South Wales.

=== A tone poem ===
A musical interpretation of these mythical figures was the result of the visit by Jean Sibelius to the US in 1914, before which he was commissioned to compose a tone poem. Though this is generally titled The Oceanides (Opus 73), Sibelius referred to it in his diary as Aallottaret: the Finnish word for "nymphs of the waves".

== See also ==
- Nereid
