= Amopaon =

Trojan soldier in Greek mythology

In Greek mythology, Amopaon (Ancient Greek: Ἀμοπάονα) was a Trojan soldier who participated in the Trojan War. He was the son of Polyaemon.

== Mythology ==
Amopaon was shot dead by an arrow of the Achaean hero, Teucer, son of Telamon and half-brother of Ajax the Great.

“Whom first then of the Trojans did peerless Teucer slay? Orsilochus first and Ormenus and Ophelestes and Daetor and Chromius and godlike Lycophontes and Amopaon, Polyaemon's son, and Melanippus. All these, one after another, he brought down to the bounteous earth. And at sight of him Agamemnon, king of men, waxed glad, as with his mighty bow he made havoc of the battalions of the Trojans;”
