= Psamathe (Nereid) =

Nereid in Greek mythology

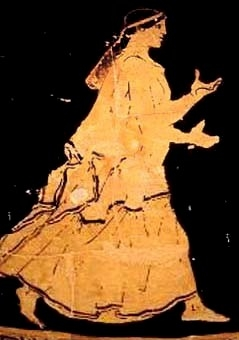
Psamathe, detail of a vase depicting the struggle between Peleus and Thetis. Psamathe is among the Nereids fleeing from the couple.

In Greek mythology, Psamathe (Ancient Greek: Ψαμάθη) is a Nereid, one of the fifty daughters of the sea god Nereus and the Oceanid Doris. By Aeacus, the king of Aegina, she is the mother of a son, Phocus. When Phocus is killed by his half-brothers Peleus and Telamon, Psamathe sends a giant wolf at Peleus's herd.

== Family ==
Psamathe is one of the fifty Nereids, daughters of Nereus and Doris. By Aeacus, the king of Aegina, she is the mother of a son, Phocus. She is later the wife of Proteus, king of Egypt, by whom she has a son, Theoclymenus, and a daughter, Eido (later known as Theonoe).

== Mythology ==
There are two myths which involve Psamathe. The first is the story of her violation by Aeacus. Upon his advances, she transforms herself into a seal in an attempt to escape. She is unsuccessful, however, and from their union is born Phocus, whose name (phoke meaning "seal") recalls his mother's metamorphosis.

Peleus and Telamon are the sons of Aeacus by his wife Endeis. The two of them kill their half-brother Phocus, and they are subsequently exiled from Aegina by their father. The second story which features Psamathe involves her sending of a wolf at the herds of Peleus, out of revenge for her son's death. After the wolf eats part of Peleus's herd, it is turned to stone by either Psamathe herself, or her sister Thetis.

== Sources ==
Psamathe is first mentioned in Hesiod's Theogony (c. 730–700 BC), where she described as "Psamathe of charming figure" and "the fair goddess". Hesiod lists her among the Nereids, and calls her the mother of Phocus by Aeacus. Pindar (c. 518–438 BC), who calls her "Psamatheia" (Ψαμάθεια), says that she bore Phocus by the shore of the sea, while Euripides, in his play Helen (c. 412 BC), offers a very different account of Psamathe, in which, "after she left Aiakos's bed", she is the wife of Proteus, the king of Egypt, by whom she has two children, Theoclymenus and Eido (the latter of which is later known as Theonoe).

The myth of Psmathe's transformation into a seal comes from the mythographer Apollodorus (first or second century AD) and a scholiast on Euripides's play Andromache, while multiple versions of the story of the wolf are given by different authors. Ovid, in his Metamorphoses (c. 8 AD), presents the most detailed account. After Phocus is killed by his half-brothers Peleus and Telamon, they are exiled from the island of Aegina by their father Aeacus. Psamathe, out of revenge for her son's murder, sends at Peleus's herd of cattle a wolf that is described as a "huge beast", with "great, murderous jaws" and "eyes blazing with red fire". Peleus is informed of the wolf by his herdsman, and "well [knows] that the bereaved Nereid [is] sending this calamity upon him". In desperation, he prays to Psamathe to "put away her wrath and come to his help"; she remains unmoved, however, until her sister Thetis prays for her forgiveness alongside Peleus, at which point she transforms the wolf into what Ovid describes as "marble". Antoninus Liberalis (second to third century AD), in his Metamorphoses, presents a much briefer version, which he attributes to Nicander of Colophon (second century BC). In this version the origin of the wolf is not specified, and it is transformed into stone, not by Psamathe, but by "divine will". A wolf is similarly mentioned by the Hellenistic poet Lycophron (born 330–325 BC), in his Alexandra: "... the Wolf that devoured the atonement and was turned to stone ...". The byzantine poet John Tzetzes (c. 1110–1180), in his commentary on Lycophron's Alexandra, presents a version of the story in which Psamathe sends the wolf, but does not transform it herself; instead it is Thetis who turns it to stone.

Psamathe also appears in book 43 of Nonnus's Dionysiaca (c. fifth century AD), during the fight between Poseidon and Dionysus, where, from the beach, she pleads to Zeus to end the battle.

== Iconography ==
Psamathe is depicted on a number of Attic vases dating from the late fifth century BC. The iconography of Psamathe is typical for a Nereid, and she is depicted in such scenes as the fight between Peleus and Thetis, and the transportation of the weapons and armour of Achilles, where she is among the Nereids carrying his weaponry while riding on a dolphin.

== Genealogy ==
Psamathe's family tree

Nereus	Doris
Aeacus	PSAMATHE	Proteus
Phocus	Eido/Theonoe	Theoklymenos
