= Daetor =

Character from Greek mythology

In Greek mythology, Daetor (Ancient Greek: Δαίτωρ) one of the Trojan warriors who attacked the Greek fleet during the tenth year of the Trojan War.

== Mythology ==
Daetor was shot dead by Teucer, half-brother of Telamonian Ajax.

“Whom first then of the Trojans did peerless Teucer slay? Orsilochus first and Ormenus and Ophelestes and Daetor and Chromius and godlike Lycophontes and Amopaon, Polyaemon's son, and Melanippus. All these, one after another, he brought down to the bounteous earth. And at sight of him Agamemnon, king of men, waxed glad, as with his mighty bow he made havoc of the battalions of the Trojans;”
