= Endeïs =

Character of ancient Greek mythology

In Greek mythology, Queen Endeïs (/ɛnˈdiːɪs/; Ancient Greek: Ενδηίς or Ενδαΐς) was the wife of King Aeacus and mother of the heroes Telamon and Peleus (since Peleus was the father of Achilles and Telamon was the father of Ajax the Great and Teucer, Endeïs was the grandmother of Achilles, Ajax and Teucer). The name is a dialect variant of Engaios (Ἐγγαῖος, "in the earth").

== Family ==
Endeïs was either the daughter of Chiron and the nymph Chariclo; the daughter of Pandion of Athens; or the daughter of the Megarian warlord Sciron.

In some versions, Endeïs's father, Sciron, married her to Aeacus after he declared Sciron the military leader of Megara.

== Mythology ==
Endeïs hated her stepson Phocus, Aeacus's son by the Nereid Psamathe, and wished he were dead. It is also thought that Telamon and Peleus were jealous of Phocus because he excelled at athletic sports. In either case they drew lots and Telamon was chosen to murder Phocus, his half brother. This was done in a ruse at the pentathlon which they convinced Phocus to participate in. In the sport, Telamon threw a discus under the pretense of participating in the competition. The projectile hit its target, "accidentally" killing Phocus.

Both Telamon and Peleus hid the body of Phocus, but it was soon discovered. For this Aeacus exiled them both from Aegina.
