= Alcimache =

In Greek mythology, the name Alcimache (Ancient Greek: Ἀλκιμάχη, romanized: Alkimákhe, lit. 'strong in battle' or 'brave warrior') may refer to:

- Alcimache, daughter of Aeacus and the mother of Medon by Oileus. Alternately, Alcimache was a daughter of Phylacus and mother of Ajax the Lesser, and on that account was equated with Eriopis by the author of Naupactica.
- Alcimache or Alcimacheia, daughter of Harpalion, a Maenadic follower of Dionysus; she participated in the god's Indian campaign and was killed by Morrheus (Μορρεὺς).
- Alcimache, a surname of Athena.
