= Sesostris =

Legendary pharaoh

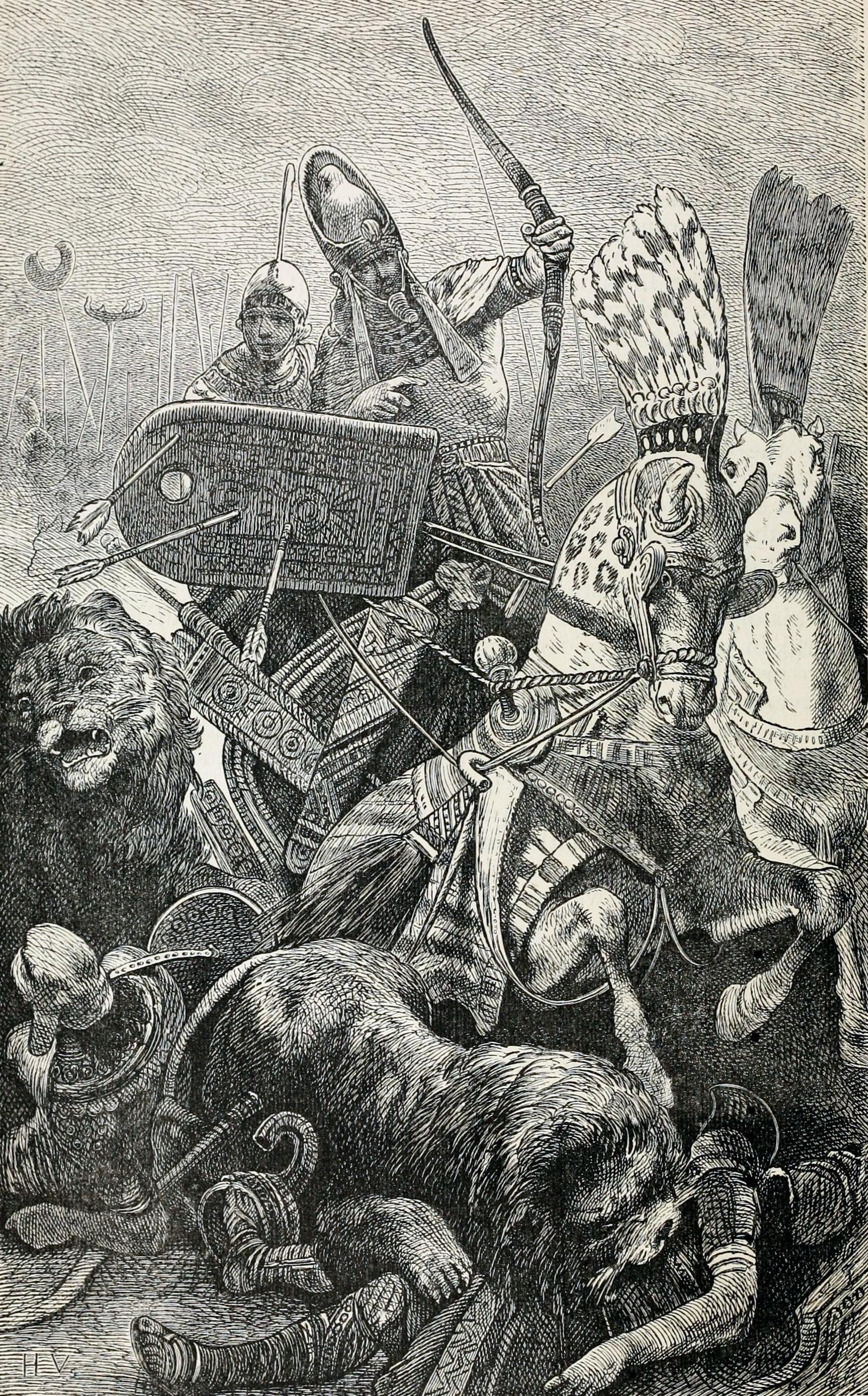
"The great Sesostris", identified in this 19th-century engraving as Ramesses II during the Battle of Kadesh.

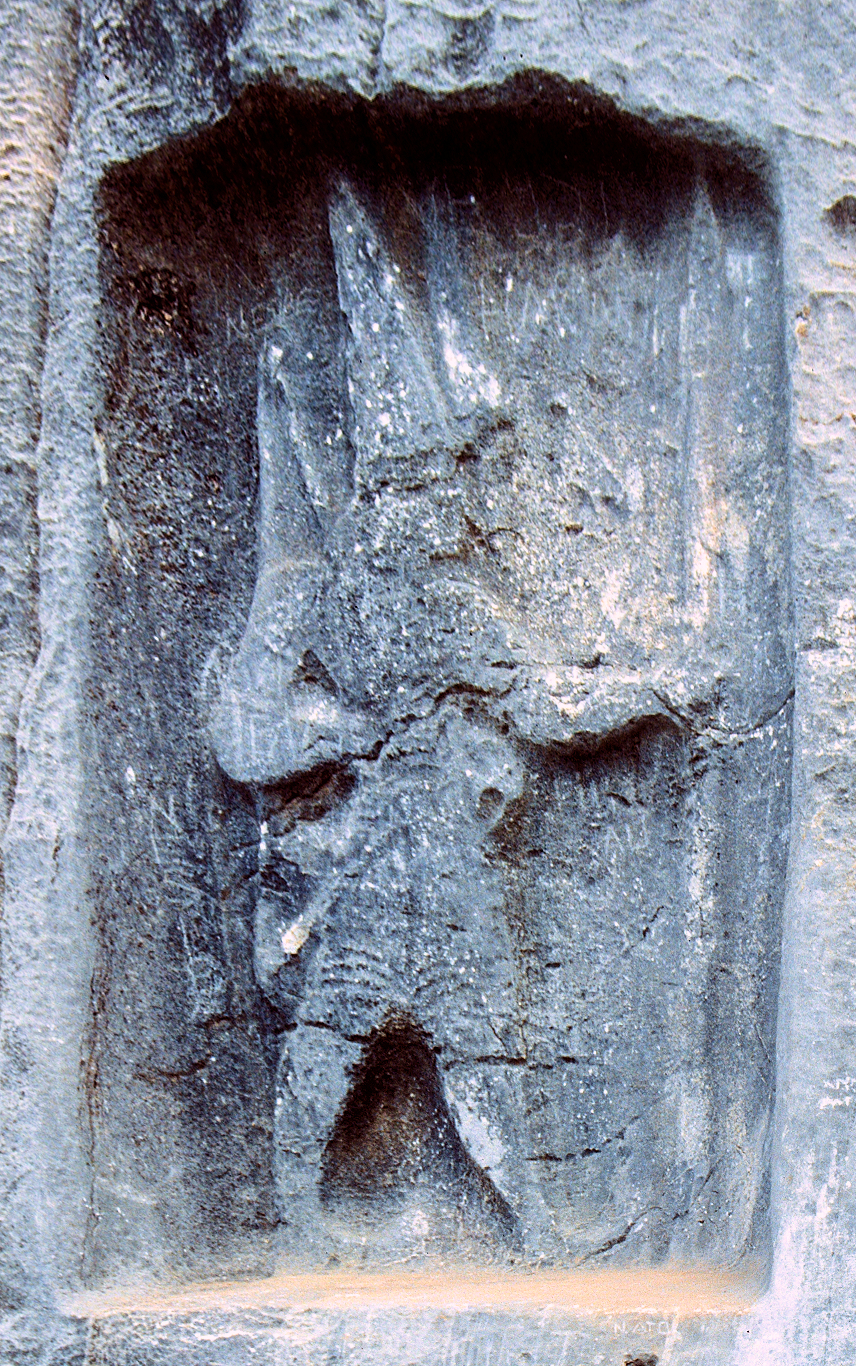
Herodotus misidentified the relief of King Tarkasnawa of Mira, as belonging to Sesostris. Karabel relief, circa 1350 BC.

Sesostris (Ancient Greek: Σέσωστρις) is the name of a king of ancient Egypt who, according to Herodotus, led a military expedition across Asia into parts of Europe. Tales of Sesostris are probably based on the life of Senusret I, Senusret III and perhaps other Pharaohs such as Shoshenq I and Ramesses II.

Sesostris's name is also given as Sesoösis or Sesonchosis in other sources.

== Account of Herodotus ==
Herodotus's Histories relate a story told by Egyptian priests about a Pharaoh Sesostris who had led an army overland northward to Asia Minor, then fought his way westward into Europe, where he defeated the Scythians and the Thracians — possibly in modern Romania and Bulgaria. Sesostris then returned home, leaving colonists behind at the river Phasis in Colchis. Herodotus cautioned the reader that much of this story came second hand via Egyptian priests, but also noted that the Colchians were commonly believed to be Egyptian colonists.

Herodotus also related that when Sesostris defeated an army without much resistance he erected a pillar in their capital with an image of a vulva on it to shame the defeated side by comparing them to women. Pliny the Elder also made mention of Sesostris, who, he claimed, was defeated by Saulaces, a gold-rich king of Colchis.

Herodotus further described how the priests told him that when Sesostris returned to Egypt, he divided the country among all the Egyptians by giving each an equal square parcel of land, which became his revenue base through an annual land tax. According to Herodotus, he also then built two statues, one of himself and one of his wife, each thirty cubits high, and statues of his four sons, each twenty cubits in height, outside the "temple of Hephaestus."

Herodotus wrote that Sesostris was the father of the blind king Pheron, who was, unlike him, not warlike.

According to Professor Alan Lloyd, the core of the narrative advanced by Herodotus is "provided by an Egyptian tradition which presented Sesostris as a model of the ideal of kingship. This certainly contained an historical element, but it has been supplemented and contaminated by folklore, nationalist propaganda, and Greek attitudes."

== Diodorus Siculus ==
According to Herodotus, Sesostris conquered Scythia and Aethiopia, while Strabo related that he also sent armies to Iberia and Diodorus asserted that he organized the rules governing the warrior class and "set in order all the regulations that have to do with military campaigns". Diodorus also wrote that "with regard to this king not only are the Greek writers at variance with one another, but also among the Egyptians the priests and the poets who sing his praises give conflicting stories”; that Sesostris was sent to Arabia by his father, with an army in tow, to hunt animals, after which he conquered Arabia; and that he "subdued all Asia" before facing difficulties in Thrace and "fix[ing] the limits of his expedition" there. Finally, Diodorus mentioned the reported practice of circumcision among the Colchians as evidence given by some Egyptians that the Colchians were descended from Egyptian settlers.

== Other classical sources ==
Aelian wrote that the Egyptians believed that Hermes taught wisdom to Sesostris, while the 4th century Christian historian Eusebius reported that Sesostris was said to be 4 cubits and 3 palms tall, and Aristotle asserted that Sesostris lived before King Minos, and that he established a caste system in Egypt. Aristotle also wrote that Sesostris was the first to attempt to build a canal to the Red Sea, but that he stopped when he realised the sea was higher than the land.

== Modern research ==
In his Aegyptiaca, the Hellenistic-era Egyptian priest and historian Manetho wrote that a pharaoh he calls "Sesostris" occupied the same position as the known pharaoh Senusret III of the Twelfth Dynasty; "Sesostris" is now usually viewed as a Greek corruption of "Senusret"/"Senwosret"/"Senwosri". Moreover, Manetho's "Sesostris" is believed to be based on the historical Senusret III — possibly conflated with memories of other namesake pharaohs of his dynasty — as well as on Seti I and Ramesses II of the much later Nineteenth Dynasty.

The images of Sesostris carved in stone in Ionia which Herodotus describes should likely be identified with the Luwian inscriptions of Karabel Pass, the Karabel relief, now known to have been carved by Tarkasnawa, king of the Arzawan rump state of Mira in Anatolia. The kings of the Eighteenth and Nineteenth dynasties were possibly the greatest conquerors that Egypt ever produced, and their records are much clearer than the older dynasties on the limits of Egyptian expansion. Senusret III raided into the Levant as far as Shechem, also into Aethiopia, and at Semna above the second cataract set up a stela of conquest that in its expressions recalls the stelae of Sesostris in Herodotus: Sesostris may, therefore, be the highly magnified portrait of this Pharaoh.

Sesostris is also mentioned in the Alexander Romance where Alexander the Great is described as "the new Sesostris, ruler of the world.

The 1728 play Sesostris is based on this king's legendary life.

== See also ==
- War of Vesosis and Tanausis

== Bibliography ==
- Herodotus ii. 102-111
- Diodorus Siculus i. 53-59
- Strabo xv. p. 687
- Kurt Sethe, "Sesostris", in Untersuchungen zur Geschichte und Altertumskunde Agyptens, tome ii. Hinrichs, Leipzig (1900).
