= Theonoe (daughter of Proteus) =

Egyptian character in Greek mythology

In Greek mythology, Theonoe (Ancient Greek: Θεονόη, romanized: Theonóē, lit. 'she of god-like mind') is a character in Athenian playwright Euripides' play Helen. She is presented as the daughter of the Egyptian king, Proteus, and the Nereid Psamathe. She was the sister of Theoclymenus, the ‌current king of Egypt. Her name means "divine wisdom," coming from theós 'god' and nóos or noûs 'mind.' Theonoe's earlier name was Eido (Eidothea).

== Mythology ==
According to Euripides' telling, Paris only abducted a phantom of the title heroine from her husband, Menelaus, and the real Helen was taken to Egypt by the gods, where Theoclymenus attempted to marry her, but she would not consent. Theonoe didn't want her brother to marry Helen against the latter's will, and when Menelaus also ended up in Egypt, (after getting caught in a sea storm on his way home from Troy), she helped them escape together. Theoclymenus accused Theonoe of plotting against him and sentenced her to death, but the Dioscuri (brothers of Helen) intervened and saved her life. According to Conon, Theonoe fell in love with Canopus, the young and handsome pilot of Menelaus' ship; he, however, did not return her feelings.
