= Rhampsinit =

Fictional Egyptian king

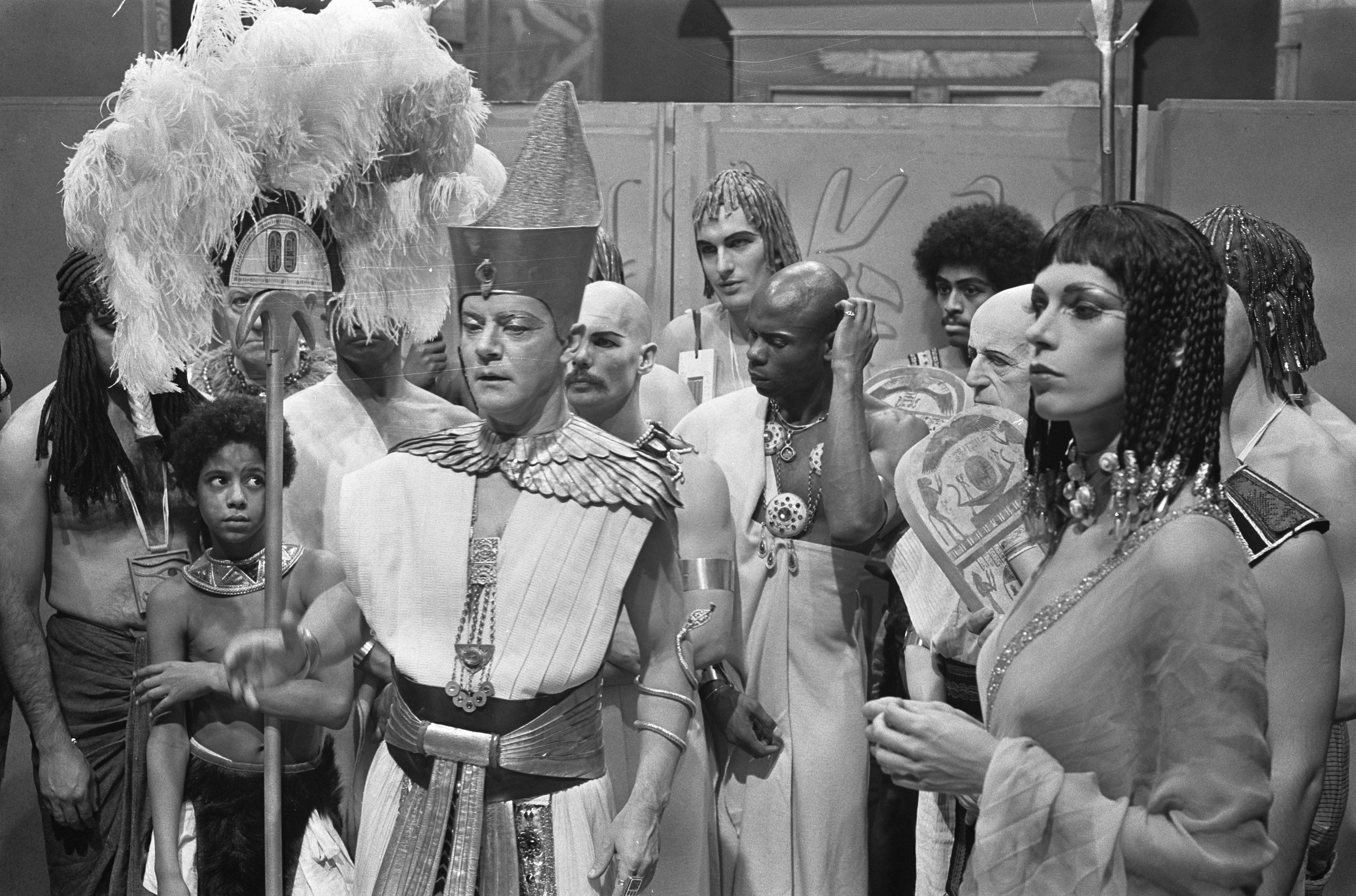
Rhampsinit and the masterthief (Dutch TV, 1973)

Rhampsinit (also called Rhampsinitos, Rhampsinitus, Rampsinitus, Rampsinit, derived from Herodotus' Greek Ῥαμψίνιτος Rhampsínitos) is the hellenized name of a legendary king (pharaoh) from Ancient Egypt. He is named by the ancient Greek historian Herodotus as a literary figure in his Historiae. There it is told that Rhampsinit was the predecessor of Kheops, Herodotus’s name for Khufu. The first tale of Rhampsinit is about two thieves who rob the king until one of them dies. His brother tries to rescue the corpse and then manages to fool the king to avoid arrest. The second tale is about Rhampsinit's visit to Hades.

== Tales ==
The stories of Rhampsinit are told in book 2 (chapter 121–124) and today known as Rhampsinit and the masterthief and Rhampsinit's visit to Hades. Herodotus starts the story in chapter 121 with a short introduction of the king: “After Proteus, they told me, Rhâmpsinitós received in succession the kingdom, who left as a memorial of himself that gateway to the temple of Hephaistos which is turned towards the West.” Then he tells the two tales of king Rhampsinit:

=== Rhampsinit and the masterthief ===
Rhampsinit has hoarded a large amount of gold and silver, and orders a mason to build him a secure treasure room. When building the room, the mason secretly leaves one stone loose, so that it can be removed. On his deathbed, the mason tells his two sons about the loose stone. The brothers decide to sneak into the treasury house frequently and fill their pockets with loot.

After some time has passed, Rhampsinit becomes aware that his treasury is decreasing and gets upset, as the treasure room’s well-guarded door remains untouched. The king then places a large trap in the room. The next time the brothers sneak into the treasury, one of them becomes ensnared in the trap. Recognizing that he cannot escape, he begs his brother to decapitate him, so that the living brother can escape identification. His brother does so and brings his brother’s head to their mother. Rhampsinit is stupefied upon the discovery of the headless thief, realizing that another thief lives, and orders soldiers to hang the body up on a wall and to arrest anyone seen weeping or grieving near it. The thief’s mother demands that he retrieve the body of his brother, threatening to reveal the story to the king if he cannot do so.

The thief uses the stolen money to procure several donkeys, which he loads with full wineskins and drives nearby the body of his brother. Upon arriving, he deliberately loosens the wineskins, causing the wine to leak onto the ground, and begins lamenting and berating his donkeys. The ruckus draws over the soldiers guarding the body, who try to calm him down. The thief acts as if he is grateful for the guardians’ help and gives them large amounts of wine. By night, the guards have passed out drunk. The thief then takes his brother’s body back to his mother, shaving one side of each guard’s face on his way out.

In another attempt to catch the thief, the king orders his daughter to pretend to be a "maid" in the royal brothel. The princess is then ordered to sweet-talk every lover into telling her his most sinister deed. The master thief visits the princess, but, suspecting the ruse, he brings the right arm of his deceased brother and then tells her about his deed. When the princess tries to hold him by the arm, he releases the dead arm and flees.

Embarrassed and baffled, yet impressed, Rhampsinit declares that he will not punish the masterthief and will give him his daughter in marriage if the thief will tell Rhampsinit how he accomplished his feats. The masterthief accepts the invitation, and tells his story to a fascinated Rhampsinit.

=== Rhampsinit's visit to Hades ===
After leaving the royal throne to the masterthief, Rhampsinit travels alive to the underworld, which is called “Hades” by the Hellenes. There he plays dice with the goddess Demeter. After defeating her, the king is allowed to return to the realm of the living, and Demeter gives him a golden towel as his prize. As soon as Rhampsinit returns home, all priests of Egypt celebrate a feast; Herodotus says that this feast was still celebrated in his lifetime.

Herodotus closes his stories in chapter 124, where Rhampsinit is followed by a king Kheops, whom the author describes as "cruel" and "evil."

== Further sources about Rhampsinit ==
Rhampsinit is also mentioned by the late Roman Egyptian historian John of Nikiû, who evidently took his information from Herodotus. However, John of Nikiû confused Rhampsinit partly with king Khufu and additionally reports that Rhampsinit built three temples (the pyramids) and that he closed all temples of the country.

== Modern evaluations ==
The story of Rhampsinit is today evaluated as some sort of satire, in which a king is fooled by a humble citizen. The tale shows great similarities to other demotic fairy tales, in which Egyptian kings are depicted as being dimwits and their deeds are negligent or cruel. It is also typical for those fables to depict mere servants or citizens as superior to the king. Herodotus' stories fit perfectly into that schema. In all of his anecdotes he somehow manages to draw a negative or, at least, sinister character picture of any Egyptian ruler. Morris Silver points to similarities of Herodotus' story to that of Trophónios and Agamedes and the treasury of Hyreus, written by Pausanias in 200 A.D.. The story of Rhampsinit playing dice with Demeter in Hades is seen as an allusion to the old tradition to throw dice in attempt to clear up economical and/or political decisions, such as division of conquered lands or allocations of estates.

In folkloristics, the story of Rhampsinitus is classified in the Aarne-Thompson-Uther Index as tale type ATU 950.

== Bibliography ==
- Charles, Robert H. (2007) [1916]. The Chronicle of John, Bishop of Nikiu: Translated from Zotenberg's Ethiopic Text. Merchantville, NJ: Evolution Publishing. ISBN 9781889758879.
- Katharina Wesselmann: Mythische Erzählstrukturen in Herodots "Historien". de Gruyter, Berlin 2011, ISBN 3110239663, page 282–286.
- Alexandra von Lieven: Fiktionales und historisches Ägypten (Das Ägyptenbild der Odysee aus ägyptologischer Sicht) In: Andreas Luther: Geschichte und Fiktion in der homerischen Odyssee (interdisziplinäre Tagung, Oktober 2003 an der Freien Universität in Berlin). Beck, München 2006, ISBN 3-406-54192-5, page 61–76.
- William F. Hansen: Ariadne's Thread: A Guide to International Tales Found in Classical Literature. Cornell University Press, 2002, ISBN 0801436702, page 358–262.
- Morris Silver: Taking Ancient Mythology Economically. BRILL, Leiden 1992, ISBN 9004097066, page 33–35.
- Wiedemann, Alfred. Altägyptische Sagen und Märchen. Leipzig: Deutsche Verlagsactiengesellschaft. 1906. pp. 146–153.
