= Prothoon (mythology) =

In Greek mythology, Prothoon (Ancient Greek: Προθόων, lit. 'first to rush forward' or 'one who speeds ahead') may refer to the following characters:

- Prothoon, possibly the accurate name of Protheon, one of the sons of Aegyptus, who married and was killed by his cousin Hyparete, daughter of Danaus.
- Prothoon, a minor Trojan warrior who fought against the Greeks during the Trojan War. He was killed by Teucer, the legendary Achaean archer and half-brother of Ajax the Great.
