= Proteus (king of Egypt) =

King of Egypt in Greek mythology

In Greek mythology, Proteus (/ˈproʊtiəs, ˈproʊt.juːs/ PROH-tee-əs, PROHT-yooss; Ancient Greek: Πρωτεύς, romanized: Prōteús, lit. 'first') was an ancient Egyptian king who was associated with the island of Pharos, his residence in Homer's Odyssey. Virgil, however, instead of Pharos, mentions the island of Carpathos, between Crete and Rhodes. This Greek island is the closest to Pharos geographically.

== Etymology ==
'Proteus' may be based on one of the titles of the Egyptian king, pꜣ-rwtj, signifying the "high doors" (cf. Sublime Porte) of the temple.

Proteus also seems to have been associated with Thrace, and legends portray him as coming from Thrace to Egypt, or as going from Egypt to Thrace.

There's also some sort of association of Proteus with the island of Lemnos, close to Thrace.

== Mythology ==
=== Alternate story of Helen ===
Herodotus invoked Proteus in his telling of the story of Helen of Troy. In Book II of The History, the story is told of how Proteus rose to the throne of Egypt out of Memphis, succeeding Pheron as king. He was later succeeded by Rhampsinitus. When Paris stole Helen from Sparta, winds blew him off his intended course and he found himself in Egypt. Upon their arrival, Paris and his servants discovered a temple, in which the slaves realized it would be profitable for them to take refuge. Thus, they deserted Paris, informing the authorities of his numerous wrongdoings. Word of Paris' crimes reached Proteus, who then requested Paris be brought forth for inquiry. Proteus asked Paris for the details of his journey, ultimately concluding that despite his anger and Paris' terrible actions, he cannot kill a man who is a stranger from another land. Instead of death as Paris' punishment, Proteus took Helen from Paris and seized the treasure stolen from Menelaus, intending to return both Helen and the treasure to Menelaus, to whom they were rightfully due. Proteus then urged Paris to leave Egypt.

Herodotus also makes references to Homer's Iliad and Odyssey, claiming Homer must have been aware of this version of events despite using the more common story.

=== Tragedy by Euripides ===
Another take on this story is presented in the tragedy Helen by Euripides. In Euripides' version, Hera had Helen taken to Egypt by Hermes, and she created a phantom replacement of Helen which Paris takes to Troy. The play takes place when Menelaus arrives at Egypt after the war. Here Proteus had safeguarded Helen throughout the Trojan War, but is dead before the play begins. It opens with Helen visiting his tomb. According to Euripides, Proteus was married to the Nereid Psamathe, had a son Theoclymenus, and a daughter Theonoe who was a gifted seer. Theoclymenus became the new king of Egypt after Proteus and had intentions of marrying Helen.

=== Proteus in The Odyssey ===
In the tale which Menelaus recites to Telemachus, Menelaus mentions being stranded on the island called Pharos. It is here after 20 days that he is approached by the goddess Eidothea, daughter of Proteus, the first minister of Poseidon. In this meeting she asks why Menelaus willingly stays on the island, to which he replies "Whichever of the divinities you are, let me tell you that I am not here of my own free will, I seem to have angered a god but which one I do not know, tell me now since gods are all knowing to whom I have displeased". Eidothea explains that it was Proteus who keeps him ashore. She hatches a plan which allows Menelaus to escape from the island, which includes the ambush of Proteus - who is described as being able to change his shape into various animals, plants, and substances.

=== Proteus in Plato's dialogues ===
Proteus is briefly mentioned in several of Plato's dialogues. In the dialogue Euthydemus, Proteus is referred to by Socrates as an Egyptian wizard who can wear different external images. Socrates uses the story of Proteus to illustrate that just as he was able to deceive others by changing himself into different images, so can persons be deceptive in speech. The same analogy is repeated in the dialogue Ion.
