= Trambelus =

Son of Telamon in Greek mythology

In Greek mythology, Trambelus (Ancient Greek: Τράμβηλος, romanized: Trámbēlos) was a son of Telamon (thus a half-brother of Ajax the Great and Teucer). His mother was the Trojan captive, Hesione or Theaneira.

== Mythology ==
When Trambelus' mother had already been made pregnant by Telamon, she escaped by jumping off his ship and swimming until she reached the land of Miletus. She then hid in the forest but was soon found by Arion, king of Miletus, who rescued her and raised her newborn son Trambelus as his own.

According to Parthenius, Trambelus lived on Lesbos where he fell in love with a girl named Apriate, but she rejected all his advances. Desperate, he laid a snare for her and tried to take her by force, but she defended herself so vigorously that he got enraged and pushed her off a cliff into the sea; alternately, she leaped off the cliff herself, preferring to die rather than give up her chastity.

Not much later, the same source relates, Lesbos was attacked by Achilles and his troops. Trambelus was among the defenders of the island and was mortally wounded in the battle. Achilles, impressed by his valor, inquired of his name; Trambelus managed to answer before he died. On realizing that the fallen opponent was his cousin, Achilles mourned Trambelus and piled up a tomb for him on the seashore; this tomb was still there in historical times.

John Tzetzes relates the same story of Trambelus' death, but states that it took place in Miletus (not on Lesbos). This version is also hinted at by Athenaeus, who refers to Trambelus as "king of the Leleges", and informs that there was a spring in Miletus known as the "Achilles' Well", in which Achilles was believed to have cleansed himself for the murder of Trambelus; the water of the spring was said to be salty on the surface, but very sweet in the main stream.
