= Saulaces of Colchis =

Saulaces was a king of Colchis known from Naturalis Historia by the 1st-century Roman author Pliny the Elder and identified by one hypothesis as a king mentioned on eight coins found on the eastern Black Sea coast.

== Pliny ==
According to Pliny, Saulaces was a descendant of Aeëtes, a king of Colchis of the Argonautic fame. He was further claimed to have found rich gold and silver deposits in the land of the Suani and to have furnished his palace with golden and silver structures obtained on his conquest of Sesostris, king of Egypt:

Saulaces, the descendant of Aeëtes, had reigned in Colchis, who, on finding a tract of virgin earth, in the country of the Suani, extracted from it a large amount of gold and silver, it is said, and whose kingdom besides, had been famed for the possession of the Golden Fleece. The golden arches, too, of his palace, we find spoken of, the silver supports and columns, and pilasters, all of which he had come into possession of on the conquest of Sesostris, king of Egypt; a monarch so haughty, that every year, it is said, it was his practice to select one of his vassal kings by lot, and yoking him to his car, celebrate his triumph afresh.

Pliny's account of Saulaces and his victory over the Egyptians is uncorroborated by other written sources, but Sesostris' connection with Colchis was treated by many Classical authors, first by the 5th-century BC historian Herodotus, who credited Sesostris with leading an expedition into Asia and transplanting a group of Egyptians to settle Colchis. Martin Bernal, who accepted the historicity of Sesostris' campaign, dated the event to the 1930s or 1920s BC.

== Coinage ==
In the 19th century, Saulaces was identified by Alfred von Gutschmid on eight rare coins, five of which were acquired in West Georgia, near Sokhumi and in Vani. This interpretation was disputed since then. The Greek inscription on these coins is incomplete (ΒΑΣΙΛΕ... ΣΑΥ or ΣΑΥΜ). The coins are now in the collections located in Moscow, Berlin, London, and Vani. In 1951, Davit Kapanadze also supported the Saulaces identification.

The alternative hypothesis is that the coins attributed to Saulaces belonged to Saumacus, a Scythian, who seized power in the Bosporan Kingdom c. 108 BC. In particular, this was argued in 2013 by Giorgi Dundua. However, another such coin was also reported in 2007 as found in Crimea, near Theodosia. The inscription on it is complete, and reads "ΣΑΥΛΑΚΟΥ" in Greek, which supports the older Saulaces identification.

== Literature ==
- Zeev Wolfgang Rubinsohn. Saumakos: Ancient History, Modern Politics // Historia: Zeitschrift für Alte Geschichte Bd. 29, H. 1 (1st Qtr., 1980), pp. 50-70
