= Karabel relief =

Bronze Age rock relief near modern Izmir, Turkey

Coordinates: 38.3706°N 27.4560°E

Location of the Karabel relief in Turkey

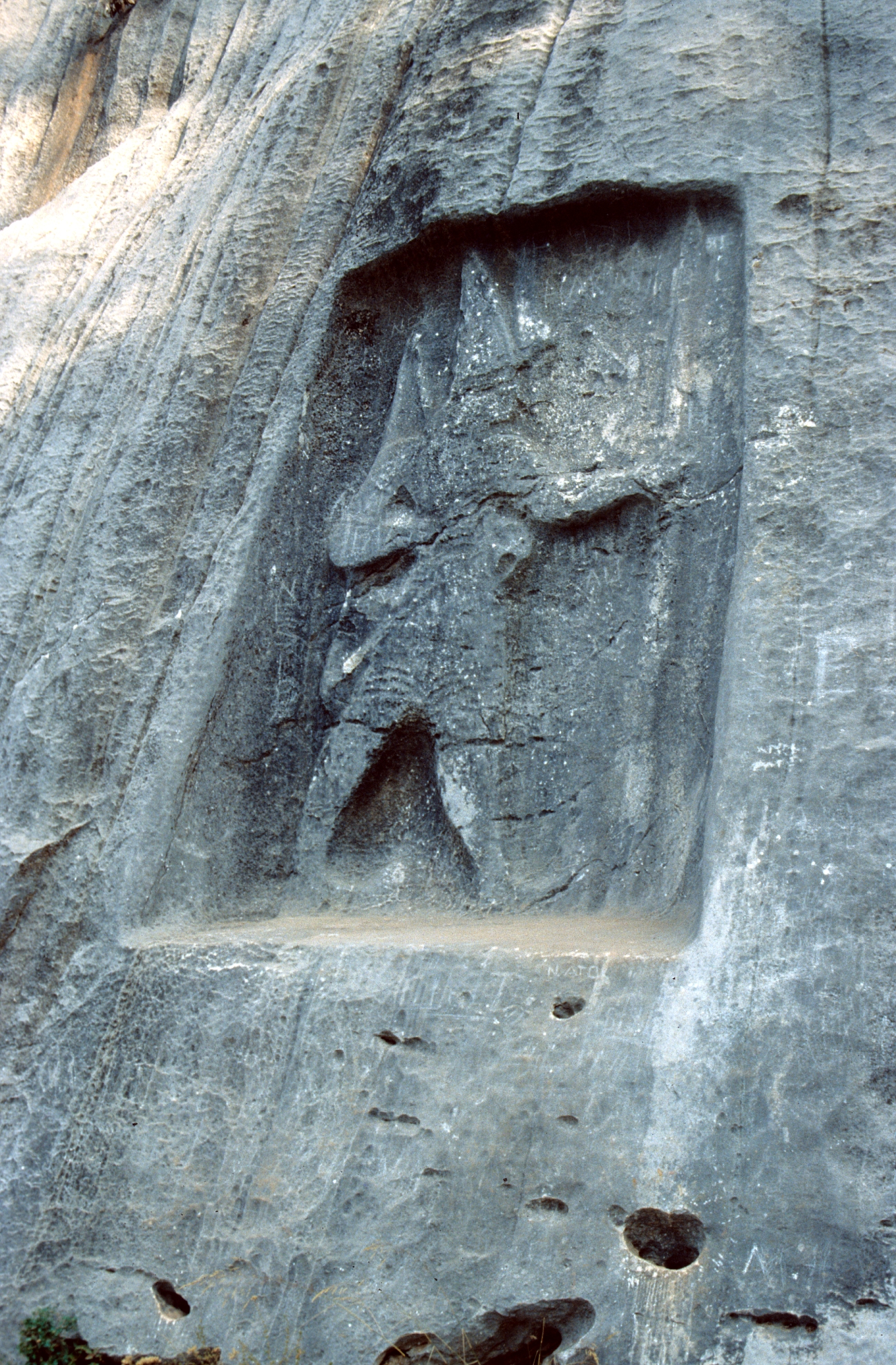
Hittite rock relief of King Tarkasnawa, Turkey

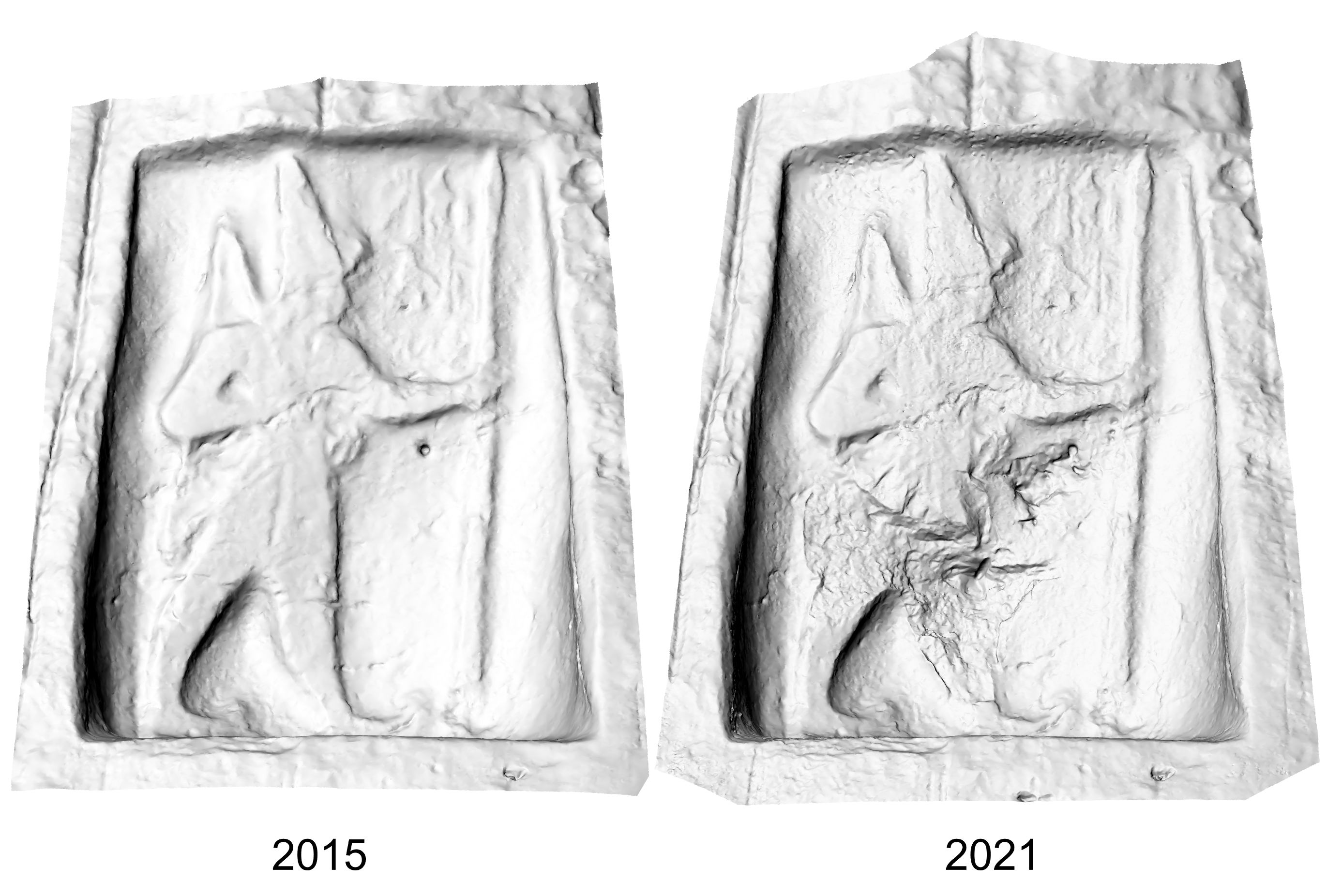
Comparison of photogrammetric scans from 2015 and 2021 showing damage inflicted in 2019

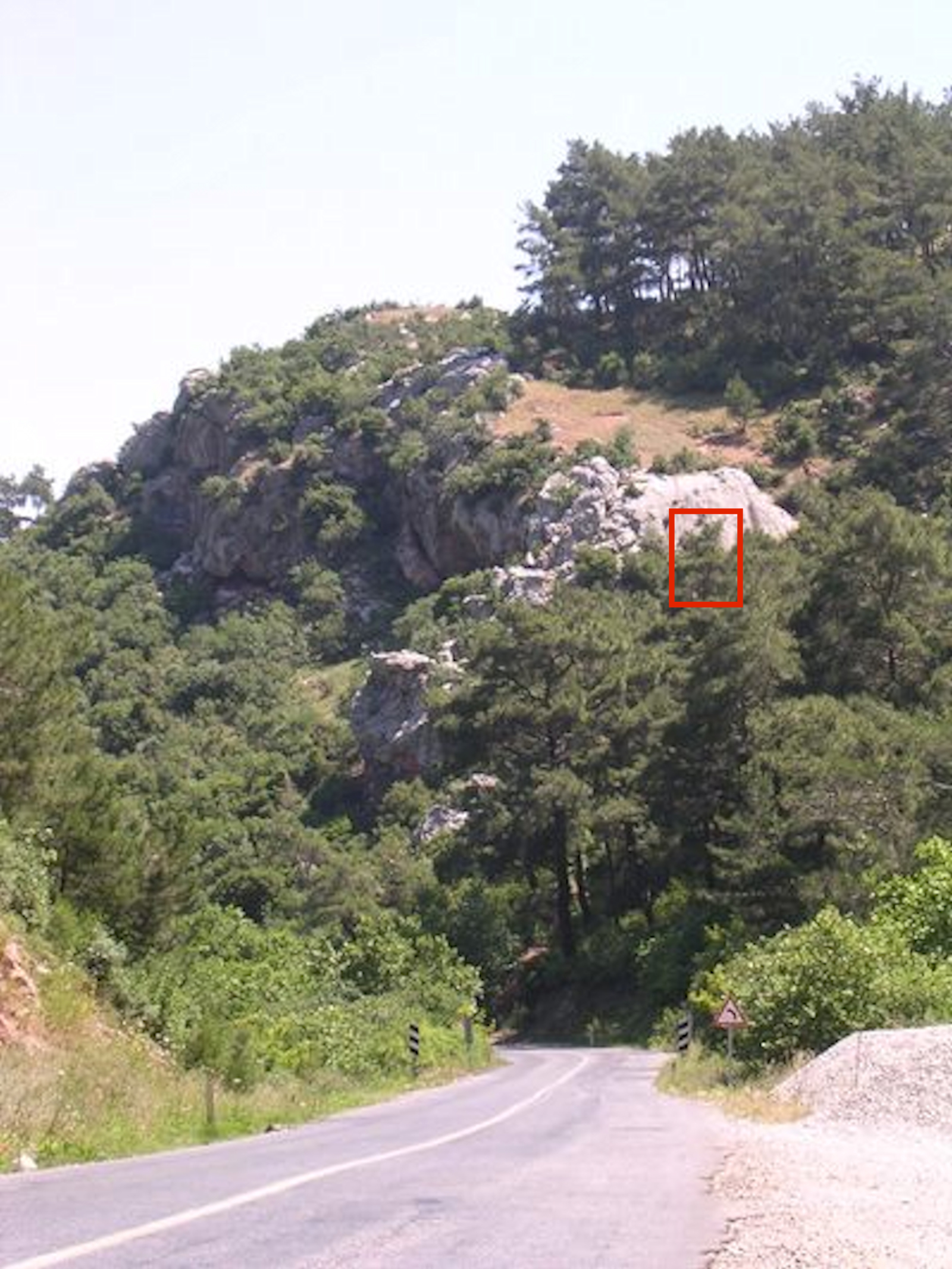
Karabel Pass, with location of the Tarkasnawa rock relief seen from the south

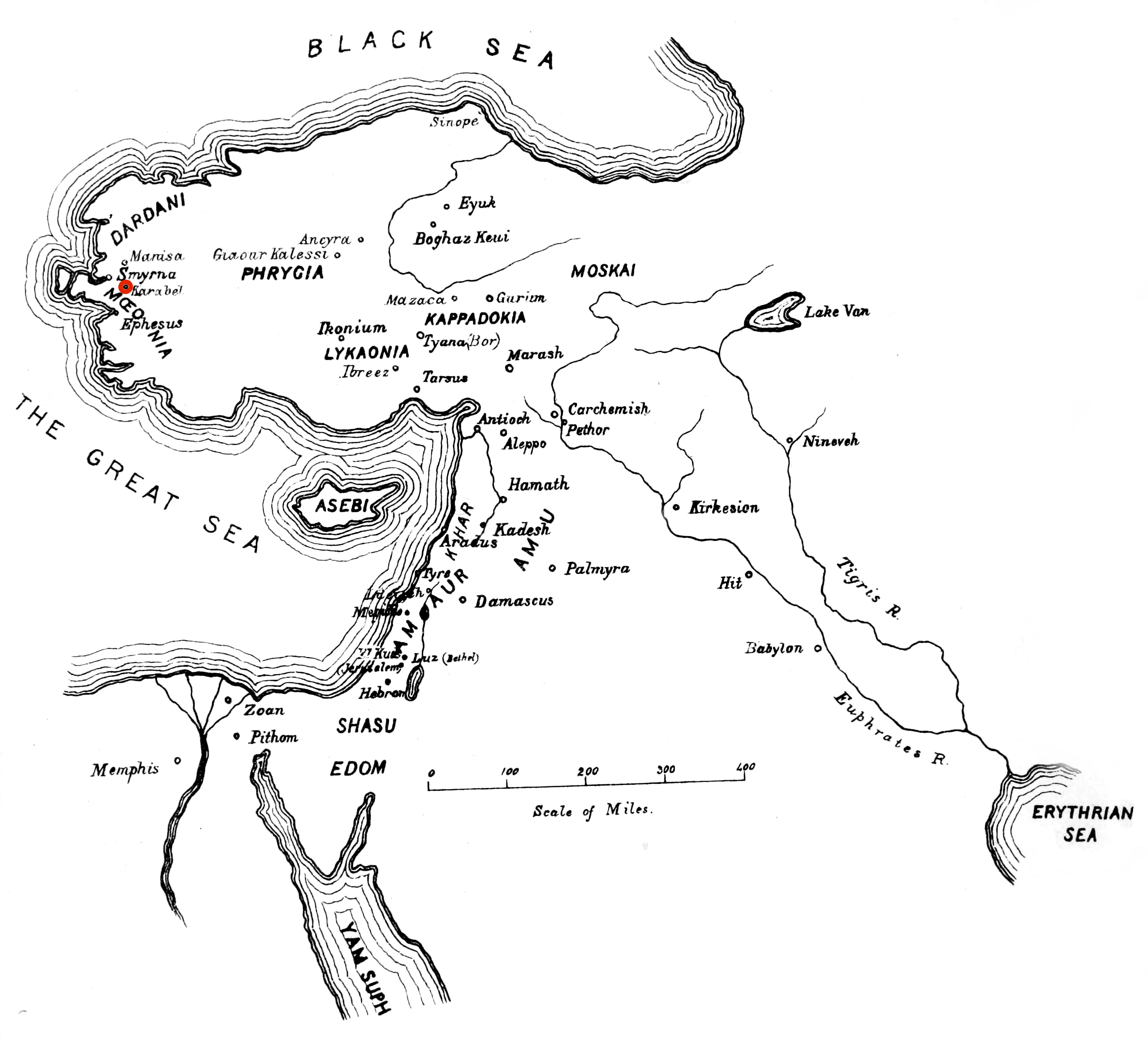
Location of the Karabel relief

The Hittite / Luwian Karabel relief is a rock relief in the pass of the same name, between Torbalı and Kemalpaşa, about 20 km from İzmir in Turkey. Rock reliefs are a prominent aspect of Hittite art.

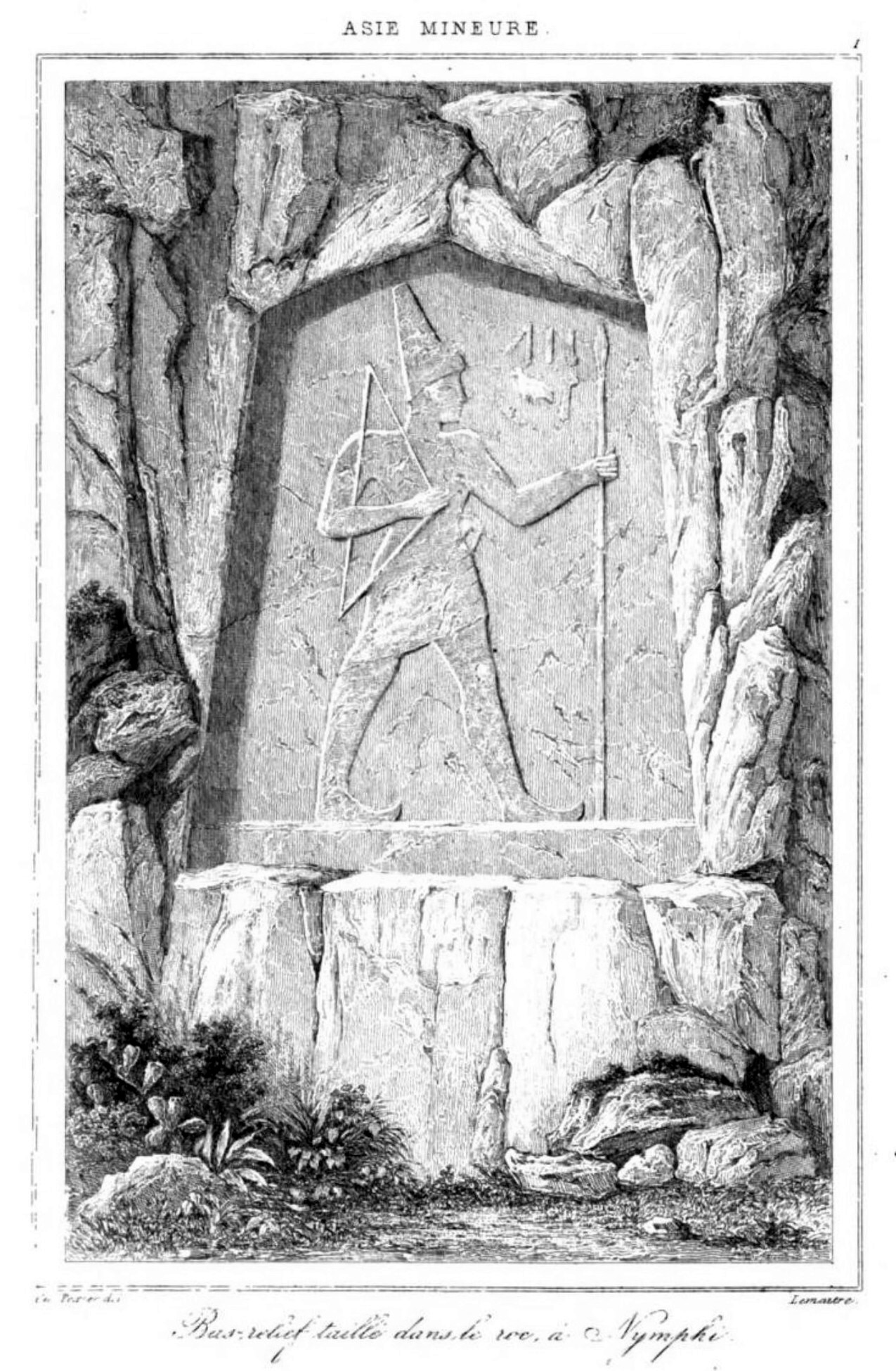
Illustration by Charles Texier

== Description ==
The monument originally consisted of four parts: two ruler figures carved into the cliff (Karabel A and B) and two inscriptions on boulders (Karabel C_{1} and C_{2}). During the construction of a road through the pass between 1977 and 1982, all the reliefs except for Karabel A were destroyed. Karabel A shows a warrior marching to the right with a bow in his right hand and a spear in his left. There are Luwian hieroglyphs inscribed above his left arm. The relief is 1.5 m wide and 2.5 m high

The Karabel relief was damaged by unknown persons, presumed to be treasure hunters, in early 2019: a hole was drilled into the relief so that dynamite could be inserted and detonated.

== Research history ==
Herodotus interpreted the figure as the Egyptian Pharaoh Sesostris. The relief was visited by the French traveller Charles Texier in 1839 – he published a description in 1862. After him, Karl Richard Lepsius visited it in 1840. Both accepted it as Egyptian. Heinrich Kiepert disproved this in 1843 by comparing it with the reliefs of Yazılıkaya. Subsequently, when the relief was accepted as Hittite, the place was visited and described by several scholars, including Kurt Bittel, Helmuth Theodor Bossert, Hans Gustav Güterbock, Ekrem Akurgal, Heinrich Otten and Annelies Kammenhuber.

== Interpretation ==
According to the latest research, the relief depicts Tarkasnawa, the king of the Hittite vassal state of Mira under the Hittite empire (13th century BC). In 1998 John David Hawkins was able to read the inscription as follows:

Tarkasnawa, King [of the land] of Mira

[son] of Alantallis, King of the land of Mira

grandson of ...., King of the land of Mira

No traces of the name of the grandfather survive, but other evidence indicates that it was Kubantaruntija.

The relief has wider historical significance as evidence that the kingdom of Mira was south of the Seha River Land. From Hittite diplomatic letters, chiefly the Milawata letter, it is known that the Seha River Land was bordered on one side by the kingdom of Mira and on the other side by Wilusa. The relief proves that Wilusa cannot have been south of the Gediz river, but must have been to the north of the river, in the Troad. This aids in the identification of Wilusa with the city of Ilion, another name for Troy in Homer's Iliad.

== Bibliography ==
- Birgit Brandau, Hartmut Schickert: Hethiter, die unbekannte Weltmacht. Piper, München 2001. ISBN 3-492-04338-0
- J. David Hawkins. "Tarkasnawa, King of Mira: 'Tarkondemos', Boğazköy sealings and Karabel," Anatolian Studies 48, 1998, pp. 1–31.
- Joachim Latacz: Troy and Homer: Towards a Solution of an Old Mystery Kevin Windle & Rosh Ireland (trans.). Oxford University Press. ISBN 3-7338-0332-9
