= Phocus (son of Aeacus) =

In Greek mythology, Phocus (/ˈfoʊkəs/; Ancient Greek: Φῶκος means "seal"), was a prince of Aegina and son of Aeacus and Psamathe.

== Mythology ==
Phocus' mother Psamathe, the Nereid goddess of sand beaches, transformed herself into a seal when she was ambushed by Aeacus, and was raped as a seal; conceived in the rape, Phocus' name means "seal". According to Pindar, Psamathe gave birth to Phocus on the seashore. By Asteria or Asterodia, Phocus had twin sons, Crisus and Panopeus.

Aeacus favored Phocus over Peleus and Telamon, his two sons with Endeïs. The Bibliotheca characterizes Phocus as a strong athlete, whose athletic ability caused his half-brothers to grow jealous. Their jealousy drove them to murder him during sport practice; Telamon, the stronger half-brother, threw a discus at Phocus' head, killing him. The brothers hid the corpse in a thicket, but Aeacus discovered the body and punished Peleus and Telamon by exiling them from Aegina. Telamon was sent to Salamis, where he became king after Cychreus, the reigning king, died without an heir, while Peleus went to Phthia, where he was purified by the Phthian King Eurythion.

However, the tradition varies with regards to the nature of Phocus' death. Other myths use the following as a means to describe Phocus' death:

1. Telamon threw a quoit at his head.
2. Telamon killed him with a spear while hunting.
3. Peleus killed him with a stone during a contest in pentathlon to please Endeis, as Phocus was her husband's son by a different woman.
4. Some authors simply mention that Peleus and Telamon killed Phocus out of envy, without giving any details.
5. Other sources say that whichever brother was responsible, it was an accident.

John Tzetzes relates that Psamathe sent a wolf to avenge her son's death, but when the wolf began to devour Peleus' kine, Thetis changed it into stone.

According to Pausanias, Phocus visited the region that was later called Phocis shortly before his death, with the intent of settling there and gaining rule over the local inhabitants. During his stay there, he became friends with Iaseus: Pausanias describes a painting of Phocus giving his seal ring to Iaseus as a sign of friendship; the author notes that Phocus is portrayed as a youth while Iaseus looks older and has a beard. Elsewhere, Pausanias mentions that Phocus' sons Crisus and Panopaeus emigrated to Phocis.

The tomb of Phocus was shown at Aegina beside the shrine of Aeacus.
