= Pheron =

King of Ancient Egypt

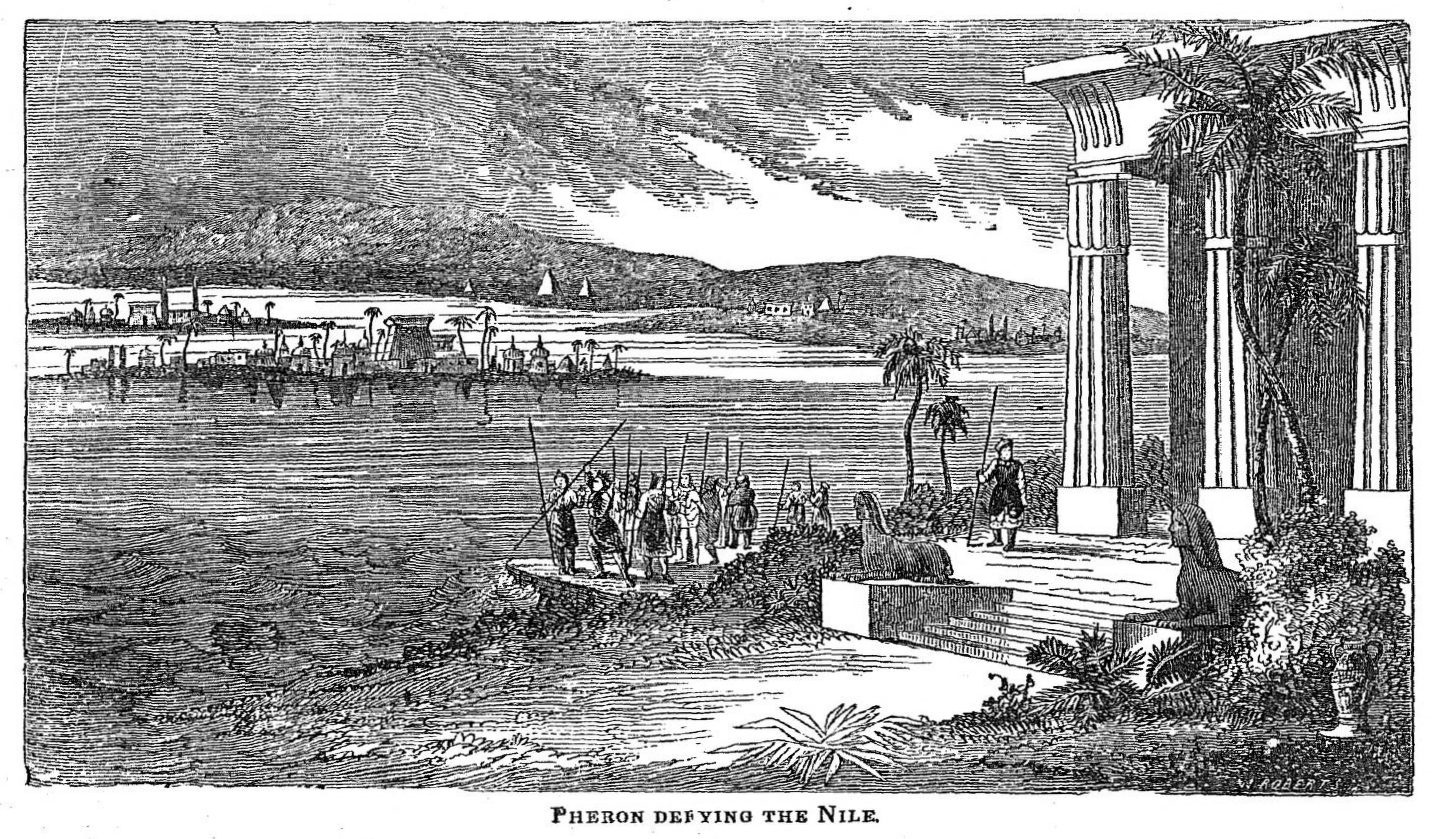
Pheron defying the Nile

Pheron (/ˈfɪrən/; Ancient Greek: Φηρῶν, Phērōn), mentioned in the Histories by Herodotus, was a king of ancient Egypt. His existence, like that of his supposed father, Sesostris, is somewhat contested. It is likely that both kings were either fully mythological, a conflation of multiple pharaohs, or corrupted interpretations of real-life monarchs. "Pheron" is probably not a name, but rather a transliteration of the title Pharaoh.

== Legend ==
According to legend, Pheron had been made blind for ten years after attacking the flooded Nile with a spear. He was told by an oracle that the only cure would be to wash his eyes with the urine of a woman who was faithful to her husband. After the urine of several women failed, including that of his own wife, he finally found one woman who cured him. He then had the other women burned to death, but he married the one that cured him. Once his sight was restored, he dedicated an obelisk at Heliopolis in gratitude for his recovery. According to Pliny, this obelisk, along with another erected by him, was brought to Rome and placed at the foot of the Vatican hill.

The next in line to the throne after Pheron was Proteus, whose legend ties in with Helen of the Trojan War. Pheron has also been identified as the Pharaoh of the Book of Exodus.
