= Lycophontes (mythology) =

In Greek mythology, Lycophontes (Ancient Greek: Λυκοφόντης) may refer to two different characters:

- Lycophontes, one of the Thebans who laid an ambush for Tydeus when he returned from Thebe at the time of the war of the Seven Against Thebes. Like many others in this ambush Lycophontes was killed by Tydeus. He might be the same with Polyphontes, the Theban son of Autophonus, who also tried to ambush Tydeus.
- Lycophontes, a Trojan soldier who participated in the Trojan War. He was shot dead by the Achaean hero, Teucer, son of Telamon and half-brother of Ajax the Great.
