= Theoclymenus (mythology) =

Several men in Greek mythology

In Greek mythology, Theoclymenus (Ancient Greek: Θεοκλύμενος, romanized: Theoklúmenos, lit. 'god-renowned' or 'famed by god') can refer to several people:

- Theoclymenus, a seer in the Odyssey who accompanies Telemachus on his journey back to Ithaca. He foresees Odysseus' return and the death of Penelope's suitors, but is not believed initially.
- Theoclymenus, king of Egypt during the final years of the Trojan War, son of Proteus and brother to Theonoe. When Proteus was still king, Hera transferred Helen to Egypt while giving Paris a false eidolon of her. Theoclymenus succeeded his father to the throne after his death and tried to marry Helen, who sought refuge at Proteus' tomb for years. Eventually her husband Menelaus stopped in Egypt during his journey back home and was reunited with Helen. Helen lied to Theoclymenus about Menelaus dying, and asked him to arrange his funeral, which was to include marine rituals on a ship. Helen and Menelaus used the ship to escape while the apotheosised Dioscuri (Helen's brothers) advised Theoclymenus not to pursue them.
- Theoclymenus, son of the Lydian king Tmolus, who buried his father after his savage death due to a wild bull attack, and named the nearby mountain after him.
- Theoclymenus, a Theban man and lover of Ismene. Athena led Tydeus, one of the attackers of Thebes, to their location, and there Tydeus drew his sword and slew Ismene.

== Bibliography ==
- Euripides, Helen in The Complete Greek Drama, edited by Whitney J. Oates and Eugene O'Neill Jr. in two volumes. 2. Translated by Robert Potter. New York. Random House. 1938. Online version at the Perseus Digital Library.
- Homer; The Odyssey with an English Translation by A.T. Murray, Ph.D. in two volumes. Cambridge, MA., Harvard University Press; London, William Heinemann, Ltd. 1919. Online version at the Perseus Digital Library.
- Mimnermus in Greek Elegiac Poetry: From the Seventh to the Fifth Centuries BC. Edited and translated by Douglas E. Gerber. Loeb Classical Library 258. Cambridge, MA: Harvard University Press, 1999.
- Pseudo-Plutarch (1878). Brady Kiesling (ed.). Names of Rivers and Mountains, in Plutarch, The Moralia. Translated by William Watson Goodwin.
