= Naupactia =

Ancient Greek lost epic poem

The Naupactia (Greek: Ναυπάκτια, Naupaktia) is a lost epic poem of ancient Greek literature. In antiquity the title was also written Naupaktika (Latin Naupactica), and it is also in the present day sometimes referred to among scholars by the Latin phrase carmen Naupactium ("Naupactian poem"). Naupactus is a city in Greece on the Corinthian Gulf.

The Naupactia was probably composed in the 6th or 5th century BC. Its authorship is uncertain: most ancient writers simply refer to "the author of the Naupactia". The 2nd-century AD travelogue writer Pausanias, who in his work refers to the poem on several occasions, records that most people in his time considered that it was by an anonymous Milesian poet, but he himself judges that it was most likely by Carcinus of Naupactus; Pausanias' reasoning is open to doubt.

It is not known how long the poem was. In current critical editions, only ten lines of the poem's text survive. Pausanias records that the poem was "written about women"; fewer than a dozen other fragmentary references give indications as to the content, but they tend to suggest that the content was largely genealogical. These two facts combined suggest similarities with the pseudo-Hesiodic poem the Catalogue of Women. More than half of the surviving fragments are devoted to the heroic story of the Argonauts: it is likely that this occupied a large proportion of the poem, and probably influenced later poetic accounts of the story such as Pindar's fourth Pythian ode, and the best-known version, Apollonius' Argonautica. One fragment recounts the tale of how Artemis revives her dead devotee, Hippolytus, and turns him into a god named Virbius. Pausanias also records a tale of the death of Mermerus in the Naupactia.

== Editions ==
- No e-texts of the Naupaktia fragments are available.
- Printed editions (Greek):
  - A. Bernabé 1987, Poetarum epicorum Graecorum testimonia et fragmenta pt. 1 (Leipzig: Teubner)
  - M. Davies 1988, Epicorum Graecorum fragmenta (Göttingen: Vandenhoek & Ruprecht)
- Printed editions (Greek with English translation):
  - M.L. West 2003, Greek Epic Fragments (Cambridge, Massachusetts: Harvard University Press)
