= Helen (play) =

Ancient Greek tragedy by Euripides

- First lines of the play, from a print edition by Oxford University Press, 1832
- Original language: Ancient Greek
- Written by: Euripides
- Chorus: Greek slave women
- Characters: Helen; Teucer; Menelaus; Proteus; First Messenger; Second Messenger; Theonoe; King Theoclymenus; Servant; Castor
- Mute: Polydeuces
- Genre: Tragedy
- Setting: Palace of Theoclymenus, Pharos

Premiere
- Date: 412 BC
- Place: Athens

Helen (Ancient Greek: Ἑλένη, Helénē) is a drama by Euripides about Helen, first produced in 412 BC for the Dionysia in a trilogy that also contained Euripides' lost Andromeda. The play has much in common with Iphigenia in Tauris, which is believed to have been performed around the same time period.

== Historical frame ==
Helen was written soon after the Sicilian Expedition, in which Athens had suffered a massive defeat. Concurrently, the sophists – a movement of teachers who incorporated philosophy and rhetoric into their occupation – were beginning to question traditional values and religious beliefs. Within the play's framework, Euripides starkly condemns war, deeming it to be the root of all evil.

== Background ==
About thirty years before this play, Herodotus argued in his Histories that Helen had never in fact arrived at Troy, but was in Egypt during the entire Trojan War. The Archaic lyric poet Stesichorus had made the same assertion in his "Palinode" (itself a correction to an earlier poem corroborating the traditional characterization that made Helen out to be a woman of ill repute). The play Helen tells a variant of this story, beginning under the premise that rather than running off to Troy with Paris, Helen was actually whisked away to Egypt by the gods. The Helen who escaped with Paris, betraying her husband and her country and initiating the ten-year conflict, was actually an eidolon, a phantom look-alike. After Paris was promised the most beautiful woman in the world by Aphrodite and he judged her fairer than her fellow goddesses Athena and Hera, Hera ordered Hermes to replace Helen, Paris' assumed prize, with a fake. Thus, the real Helen has been languishing in Egypt for years, while the Greeks and Trojans alike curse her for her supposed infidelity.

In Egypt, king Proteus, who had protected Helen, has died. His son Theoclymenus, the new king with a penchant for killing Greeks, intends to marry Helen, who after all these years remains loyal to her husband Menelaus.

== Plot ==
Helen receives word from the exiled Greek Teucer that Menelaus never returned to Greece from Troy, and is presumed dead, putting her in the perilous position of being available for Theoclymenus to marry, and she consults the prophetess Theonoe, sister to Theoclymenus, to find out Menelaus' fate.

Her fears are allayed when a stranger arrives in Egypt and turns out to be Menelaus himself, and the long-separated couple recognize each other. At first, Menelaus does not believe that she is the real Helen, since he has hidden the Helen he won in Troy in a cave. However, the woman he was shipwrecked with was in reality, only a mere phantom of the real Helen. Before the Trojan war even began, a judgement took place, one that Paris was involved in. He gave the Goddess Aphrodite the award of the fairest since she bribed him with Helen as a bride. To take their revenge on Paris, the remaining goddesses, Athena and Hera, replaced the real Helen with a phantom. Menelaus did not know better, but one of his sailors steps in to inform him that the false Helen has disappeared into thin air.

The couple still must figure out how to escape from Egypt, but the rumor that Menelaus has died is still in circulation. Thus, Helen tells Theoclymenus that the stranger who came ashore was a messenger there to tell her that her husband was truly dead. She informs the king that she may marry him as soon as she has performed a ritual burial at sea, thus freeing her symbolically from her first wedding vows. The king agrees to this, and Helen and Menelaus use this opportunity to escape on the boat given to them for the ceremony.

Theoclymenus is furious when he learns of the trick and nearly murders his sister Theonoe for not telling him that Menelaus is still alive. However, he is prevented by the miraculous intervention of the demi-gods Castor and Polydeuces, brothers of Helen and the sons of Zeus and Leda.

== Themes ==
Virtue and Oaths: In Helen, Euripides emphasizes the importance of virtue and oaths. Awaiting the return of her husband Menelaus for 17 years — the ten of the Trojan War and another seven for the search — Helen remains faithful to Menelaus and the promises she has made him: Helen made two oaths, one to the Spartan river Eurotas and another on the head of Menelaus himself as sanctifying object. Menelaus also swears fidelity to Helen: so seriously do husband and wife take their vows that they agree to commit suicide and never marry another if their plans fail. Such importance to oath-keeping is consonant with general practice during the time period (Torrance, 2009). With these oaths, Helen and Menelaus declare their love for each other and their desire to live only with the other. These oaths prove their devotion and exemplify the importance of oaths. Given the play's humor and Euripides' general challenging of norms and values, it remains uncertain what our playwright's own views are.

Identity and Reputation: Throughout all the different permutations of the story of Helen and the Trojan War, what makes the Trojan war distinctive is the fact that it is always caused, somehow, by Helen as the supreme embodiment of female beauty, whether she is or is not physically in Troy and whether she acts as an enthusiastic partner of Paris or as a reluctant victim of his unwanted rape. Euripides expands more on this idea by presenting his play largely from Helen's point of view, revealing how she truly feels about being the symbolic villain of the Trojan War. Helen's character in the play is deeply affected by the losses of the people who have died fighting to bring her back to her homeland and husband and expresses this guilt frequently: "The wrecked city of Ilium / is given up to the teeth of fire, / all through me and the deaths I caused, / all for my name of affliction" (lines 196-198). Despite this guilt, she also feels anger for being made into a symbol that people can project their hate on, even though they do not know her: "I have done nothing wrong and yet my reputation / is bad, and worse than a true evil is it to bear / the burden of faults that are not truly yours" (lines 270-272). Although she spends a lot of the beginning of the play feeling pity for the men who have died and herself as well, Euripides' Helen is independent, confident, and intelligent. She displays her ability to think on her feet as she formulates a workable plan to return home and as she rejects her husband Menelaus' unworkable plans. Therefore, Euripides in his play portrays a living and breathing Helen filled with compassion and wit, not at all similar to the blameworthy person others believe her to be.

== Translations ==
- Robert Potter, 1783 – verse: full text
- Edward Philip Coleridge, 1891 - prose: (full text at Wikisource)
- Arthur S. Way, 1896 – verse: (full text at Wikisource)
- Philip Vellacott, 1954 – prose and verse
- Richmond Lattimore, 1956 – verse
- James Morwood, 1997 – prose
- Andrew Wilson, 2007 – prose (full text)
- Frank McGuinness, 2008 – for Shakespeare's Globe
- George Theodoridis, 2011 – prose: full text
- Emily Wilson, 2016 – verse

== See also ==
- Norma Jeane Baker of Troy, 2019 play
- Richard Strauss's opera Die ägyptische Helena, the libretto for which was adapted by Hugo von Hofmannsthal from the play by Euripides
