= Tarkasnawa =

King of Mira (13th century B.C.E.)

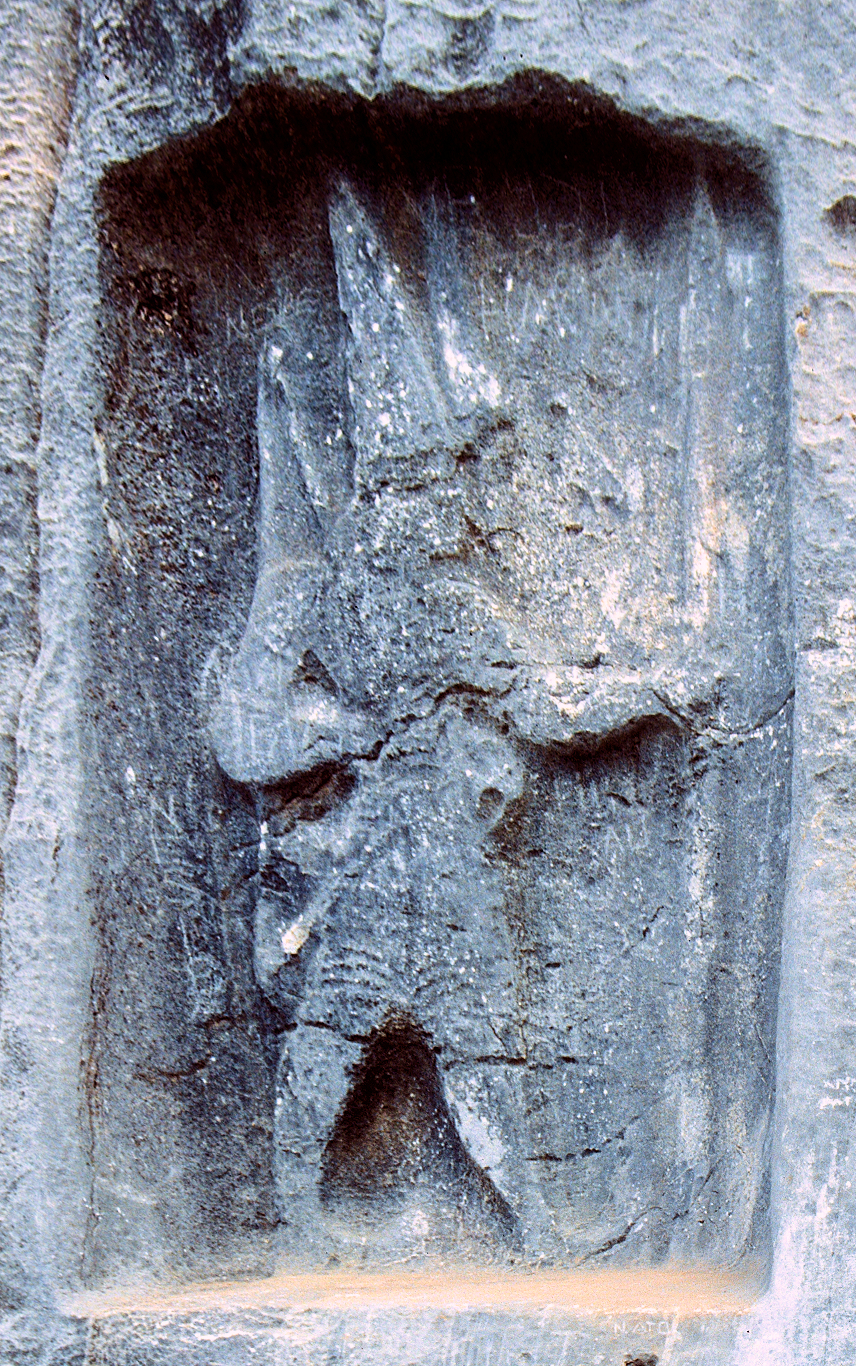
King Tarkasnawa of Mira, in the Karabel relief

Tarkasnawa was ruler of the Kingdom of Mira, and one of the last independent kings of Arzawa, a Bronze Age confederation of kingdoms in western Anatolia. He was probably the son of King Alantalli, and a contemporary of the Hittite king Tudḫaliya IV. If, as proposed, Tarkasnawa was the recipient of the Milawata letter, he may have been subject to the Hittite king.

Tarkasnawa appears in the Karabel relief, where his name is inscribed in Luwian hieroglyphs. The inscription, next to the figure of the king, reads:

(King) Tarkasnawa, king of <the land> Mira,

[son] of BIRD-li(?), king of the land Mira, grandson

of [ ... ], king of the land Mir.

He is also known from various seals, one of them in which his name was formerly read "Tarkondemos". This is a bilingual seal, combining a cuneiform inscription on the rim and the corresponding Hittite hieroglyphs around the figure in royal dress, giving the name of the ruler: Tarkasnawa. This bilingual inscription provided the first clues for deciphering Hittite hieroglyphs.

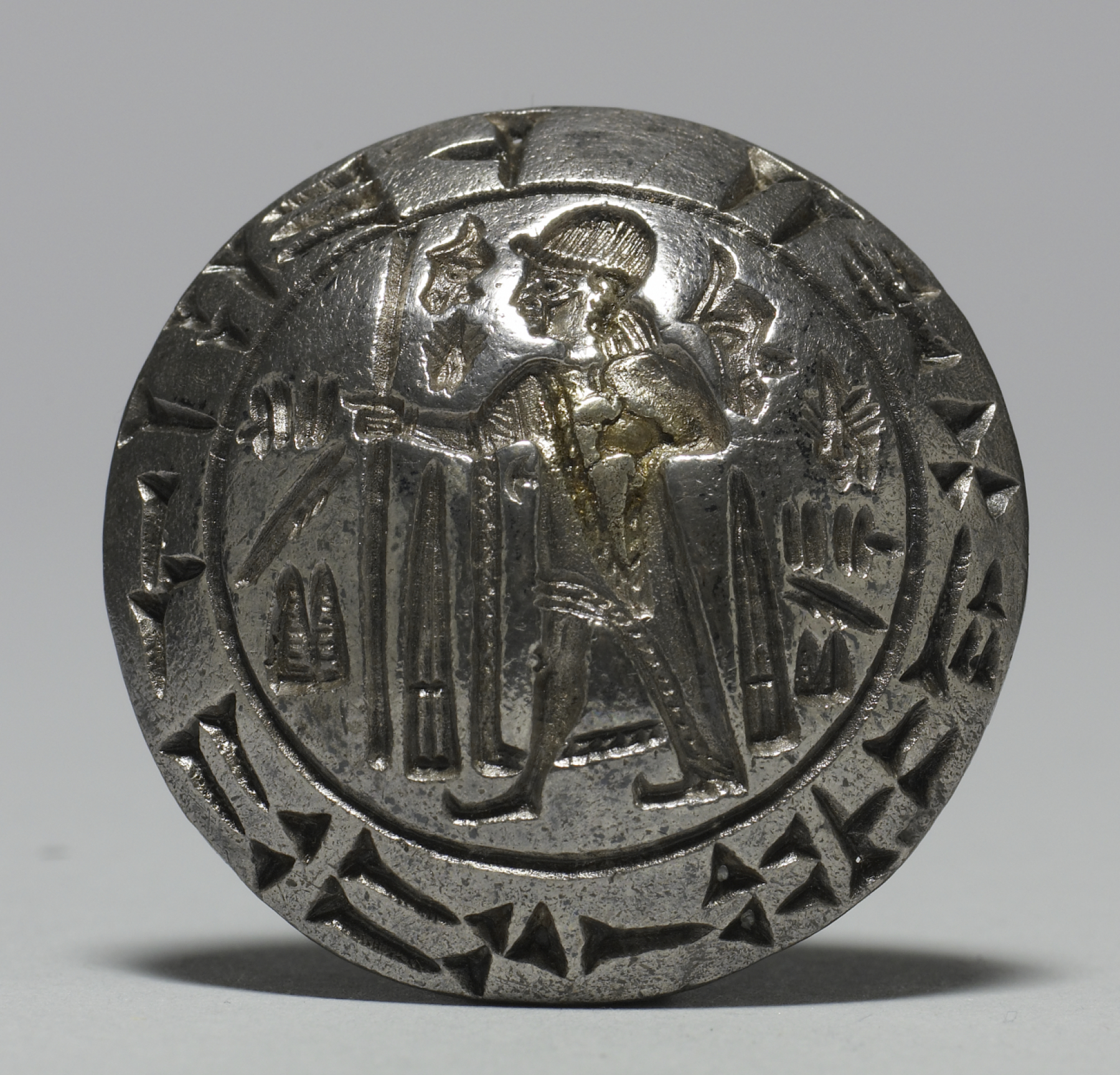
Seal of Tarkasnawas, also known as the "Tarkondemos seal", with the cuneiform inscription "tar-kaš-ša-na-wa"

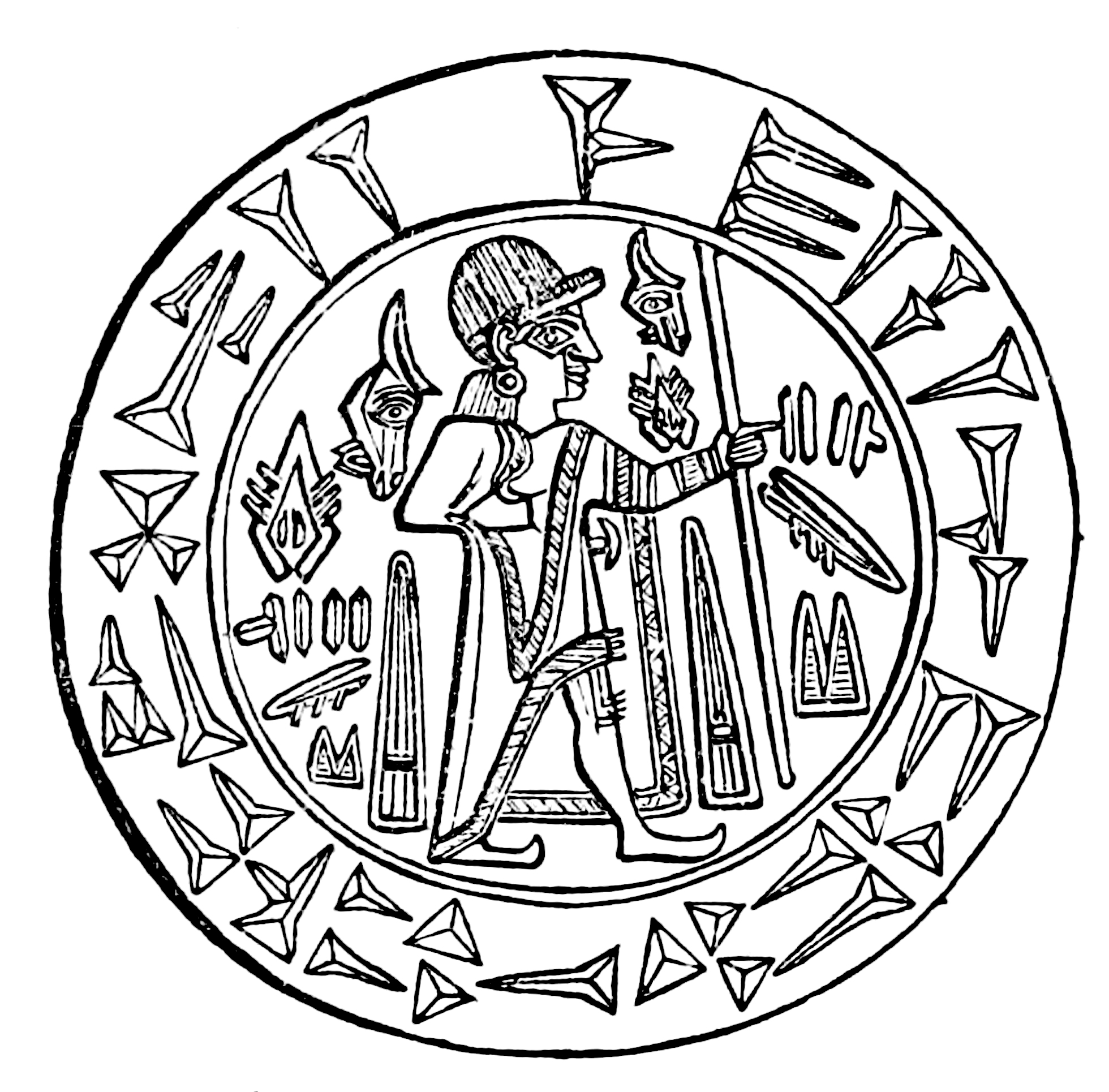
Seal of Tarkasnawa (drawing of imprint)

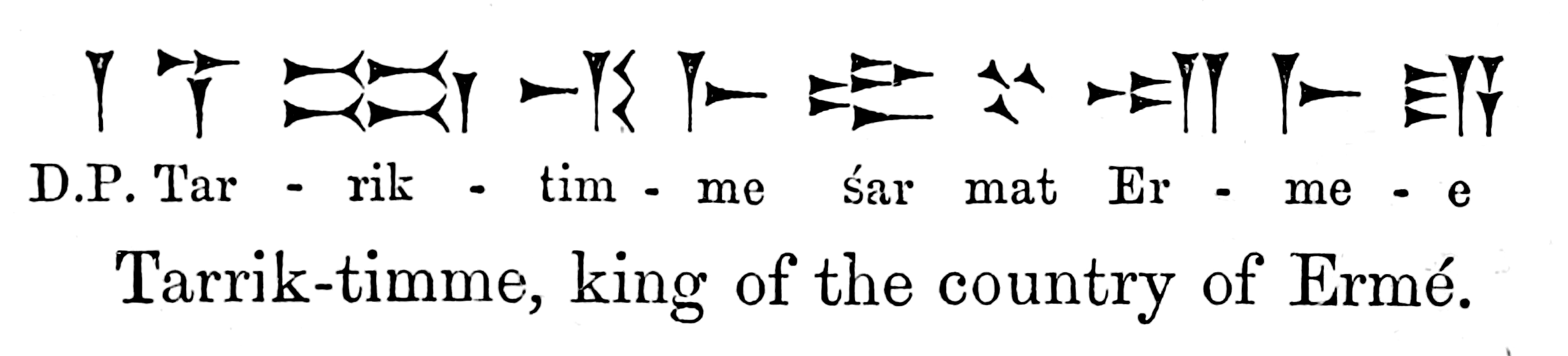
Seal of Tarkasnawa: 19th-century reading of the cuneiform

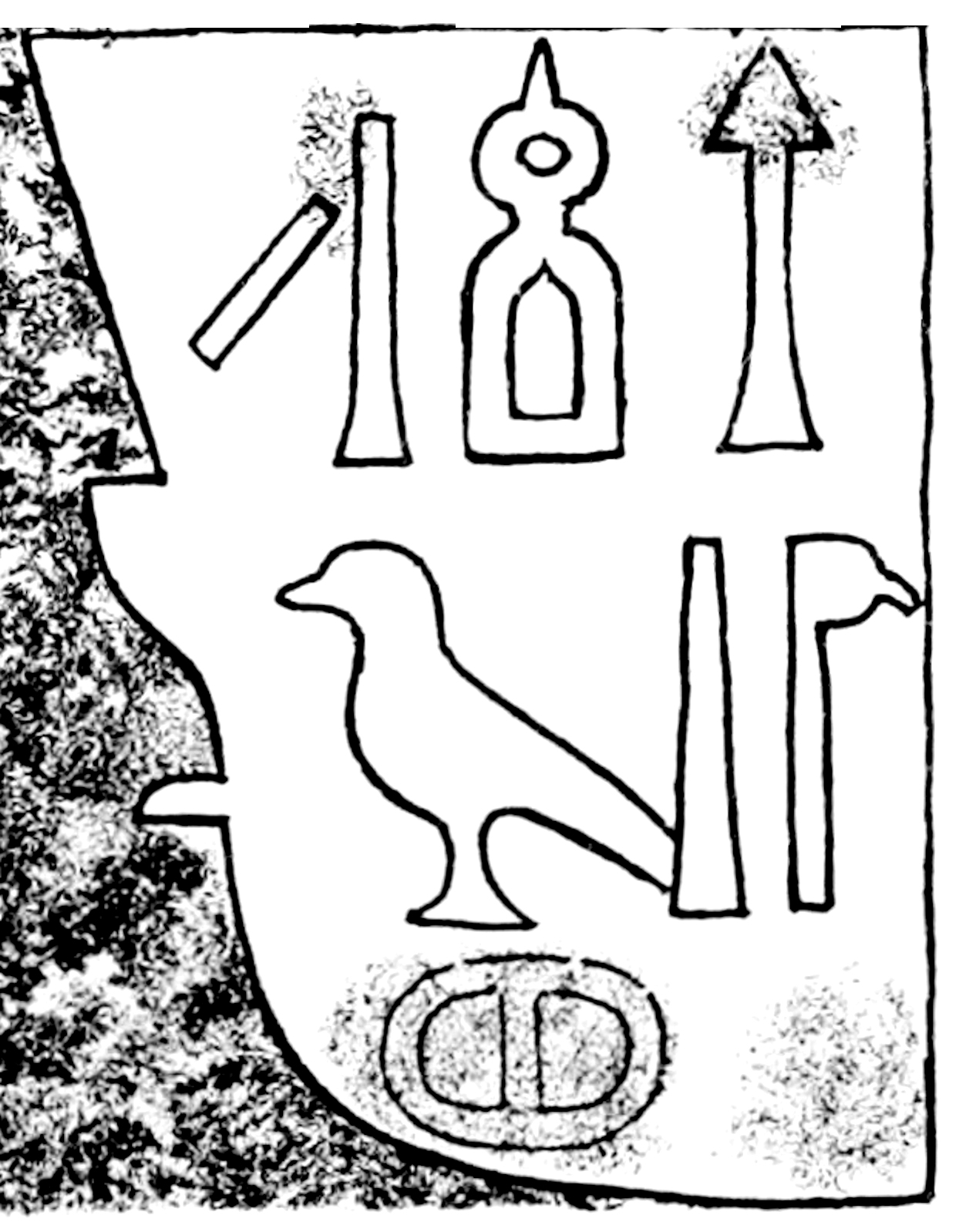
Name of Tarkasnawa in Luwian hieroglyphs on the Karabel relief
