= Ophelestes =

In Greek mythology, Ophelestes (Ancient Greek: Ὀφελέστης) may refer to the following individuals:

- Ophelestes, one of the Trojan warriors who attacked the Greek fleet during the tenth year of the Trojan War. He was killed by an arrow of Teucer, one of the leaders of the Salaminian troops.
- Ophelestes, a Paeonian soldier killed by Achilles beside the Scamander River during the Trojan War. Along with his fellow Paeonians, he was killed by the Achaean hero with his spear.
