= Telamon =

Greek mythological figure

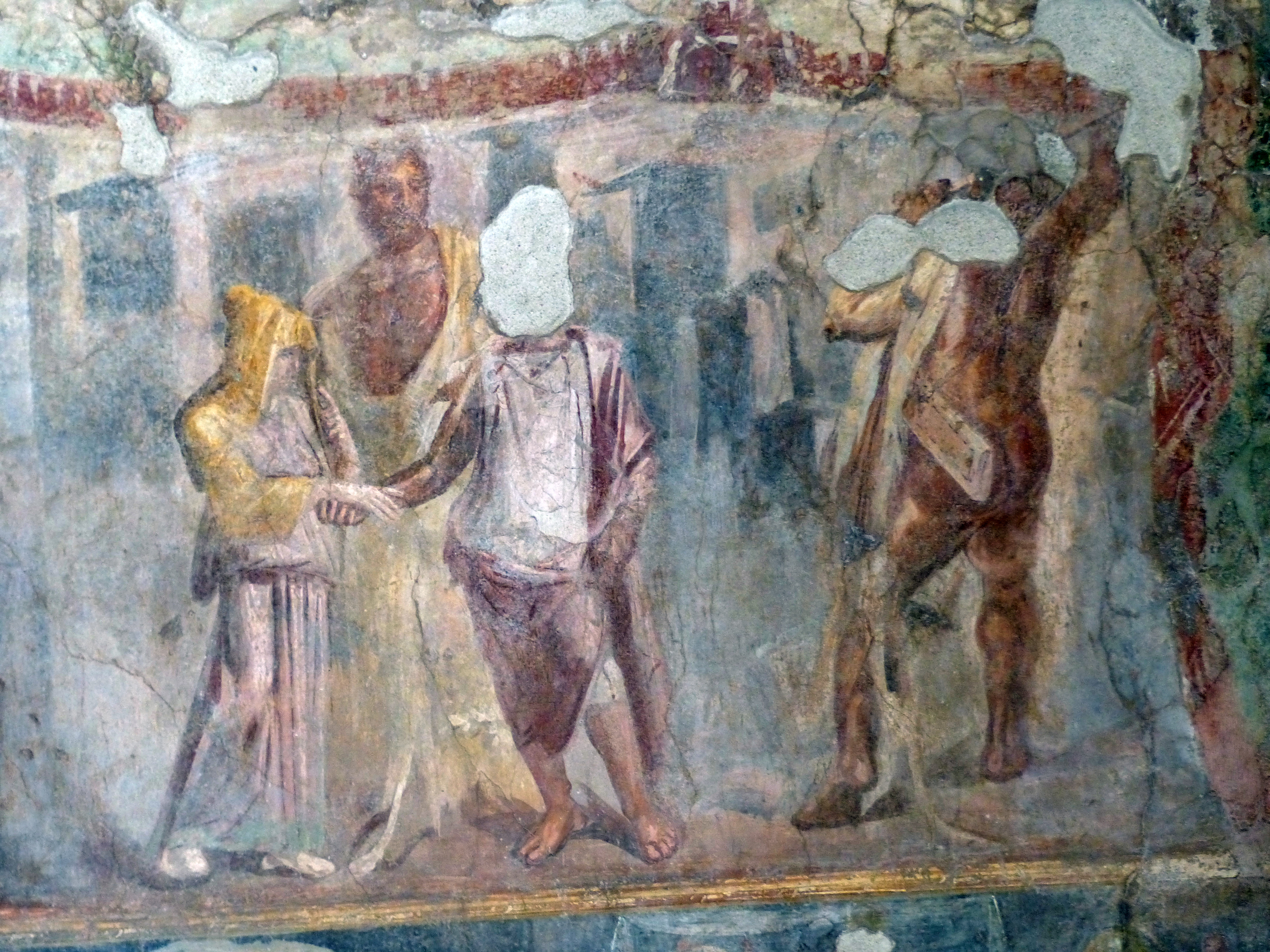
The marriage of Telamon and Hesione or Hesione's farewell to her brother Priam under the attention of Heracles and Telamon on the right, detail of fresco from the triclinium of the House of Octavius Quartio at Pompeii

Telamon (/ˈtɛləmən/; Ancient Greek: Τελαμών, Telamōn means "broad strap") in Greek mythology was the son of King Aeacus of Aegina, and Endeïs, a mountain nymph. The elder brother of Peleus, Telamon sailed alongside Jason as one of his Argonauts, and was present at the hunt for the Calydonian Boar. In the Iliad, he was the father of Greek heroes Ajax the Great and Teucer by different mothers. Some accounts mention a third son of his, Trambelus. He and Peleus were also close friends of Heracles, assisting him on his expeditions against the Amazons and his assault on Troy (see below).

In an earlier account recorded by Pherecydes of Athens, Telamon and Peleus were not brothers, but friends. According to this account, Telamon was the son of Actaeus and Glauce, with the latter being the daughter of Cychreus, king of Salamis; and Telamon married Periboea (Eriboea), daughter of King Alcathous of Megara.

== Mythology ==
After killing their half-brother, Phocus, Telamon and Peleus fled Aegina and made their way to the island of Salamis, where King Cychreus welcomed Telamon and befriended him. Telamon married Cychreus' daughter Periboea, who gave birth to Ajax; sometime later, Cychreus gave Telamon his kingdom. In other versions of the myth Cychreus' daughter is named Glauce, and Periboea is Telamon's second wife, and the daughter of Alcathous.

=== Trojan War ===
Telamon also features in both versions of Heracles' sacking of Troy, which was ruled by King Laomedon (or Tros in the alternate versions). Before the Trojan War, Poseidon sent a sea monster to attack Troy.

Tros version

In the King Tros version, Heracles (along with Telamon and Oicles) agreed to kill the monster if Tros would give him the horses he received from Zeus as compensation for Zeus' kidnapping Tros' son, Ganymede. Tros agreed; Heracles succeeded and Telamon married Hesione, Tros' daughter, by whom he sired Teucer.

Laomedon version

In the King Laomedon version, Laomedon planned on sacrificing his daughter Hesione to Poseidon in the hope of appeasing him. Heracles rescued her at the last minute and killed both the monster and Laomedon and Laomedon's sons, except for Ganymede, who was on Mount Olympus, and Podarces, who saved his own life by giving Heracles a golden veil Hesione had made. Telamon took Hesione as a war prize and married her, and she gave birth by him to Teucer. When Ajax later committed suicide at Troy, Telamon banished Teucer from Salamis for failing to bring his brother home.

Bibliotheca version

In Apollodorus' Library, Telamon was almost killed during the siege of Troy. Telamon was the first one to break through the Trojan wall, which enraged Hercules as he was coveting that glory for himself. Hercules was about to cut him down with his sword when Telamon began to quickly assemble an altar out of nearby stones in honor of Hercules. Hercules was so pleased, after the sack of Troy he gave Telamon Hesione as a wife. Hesione requested that she be able to bring her brother Podarces with her. Hercules would not allow it unless Hesione bought Podarces as a slave. Hesione paid for her brother with a veil. Podarces' name was then changed to Priam – which, according to Greek author Apollodorus, was derived from the Greek phrase "to buy".

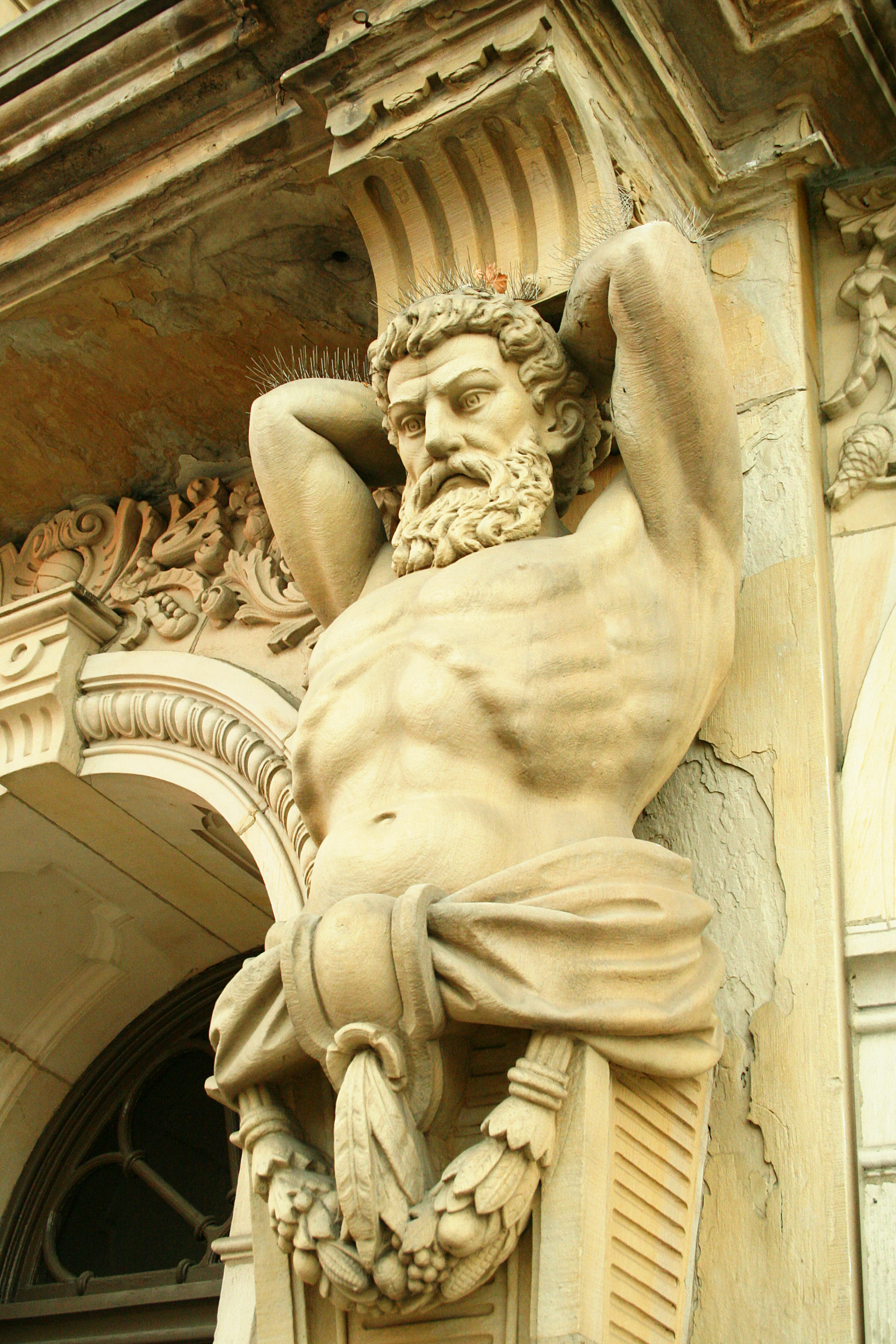
Architectural Telamon / atlantides on the Wayne County, Ohio courthouse

== In architecture ==
In architecture, telamons are colossal male figures used as columns. These are also called atlantes (the plural of "Atlas"), or atlantids; they are the male versions of caryatids.

== The Telamon ==
The "Telamon" (also "Song of Telamon", "Telamon Song", "Telamon-song") is an ancient Greek song (fl. 5th century BC) only found referred to by name in some ancient Greek plays and later scholia or commentaries. It is usually thought to be a warlike song about Telamon's son Ajax, though some other commentaries thought it to be a mournful song about Telamon himself. It began with: "Son of Telamon, warlike Ajax! They say you are the bravest of the Greeks who came to Troy, next to Achilles."

== Sources ==
- pseudo-Apollodorus. Bibliotheca. I, viii 2; ix 16; II, vi 4; III, xii 6–7.
- pseudo-Apollodorus (1921). "Online version". Bibliotheca [The Library]. Perseus Digital Library. Translated by Frazer, Sir James George. Cambridge, MA / London, UK: Harvard University Press / William Heinemann. ISBN 0-674-99135-4 – via Tufts University. Greek text. "Greek text available at the same website."
- Apollonius Rhodius. Argonautica. I, 90–94.
- Apollonius Rhodius (1912). "Online version". Argonautica. R.C. Loeb Classical Library. Vol. 1. Translated by Seaton, Robert Cooper. London, UK: William Heinemann – via Topos Text Project (topostext.org).
- Apollonius Rhodius (1912). "Greek text". In Mooney, George W. (ed.). Argonautica. London, UK: Longmans, Green – via Perseus Digital Library, Tufts University.
- Publius Ovidius Naso. Metamorphoses. VIII, 309.
- Publius Ovidius Naso (1922). "Online version". Metamorphoses. Perseus Digital Library. Translated by More, Brookes. Boston, MA: Cornhill Publishing – via Tufts University.
- Publius Ovidius Naso (1892). "Latin text". Metamorphoses. Gotha, Germany: Hugo Magnus / Friedr. Andr. Perthes. – via Perseus Digital Library, Tufts University.
- Tzetzes, John (2015). Allegories of the Iliad. Dumbarton Oaks Medieval Library. Translated by Goldwyn, Adam J.; Kokkini, Dimitra. Harvard University Press. ISBN 978-0-674-96785-4.
