= Teucer =

Greek mythical figure

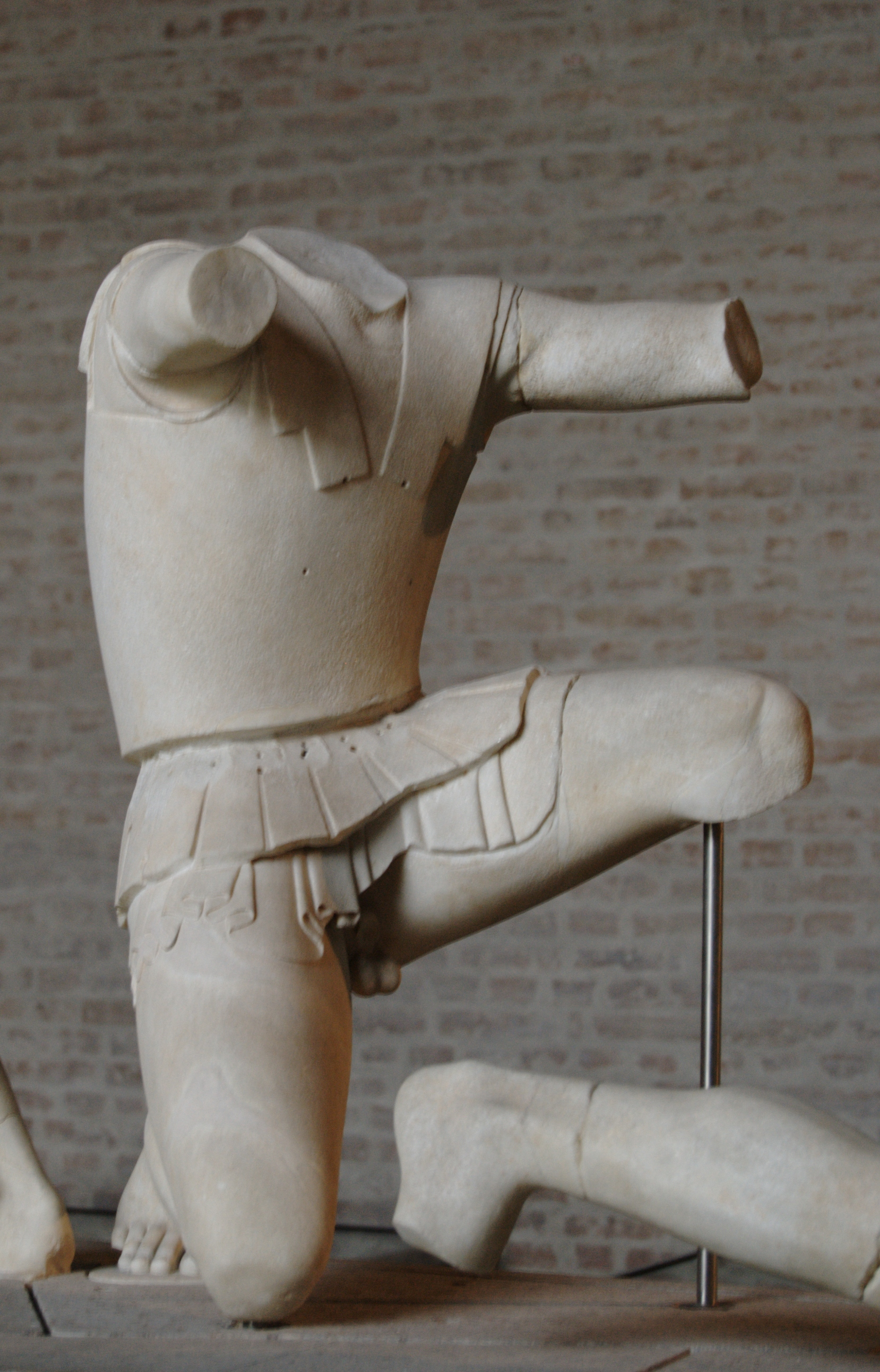
Statue of an archer, traditionally called "Teucer," from the Temple of Aphaia, ca. 505–500 BC, Munich.

In Greek mythology, Teucer (/ˈtjuːsər/; Ancient Greek: Τεῦκρος, romanized: Teûkros, also Teucrus, Teucros or Teucris), was the son of King Telamon of Salamis Island and his second wife Hesione, daughter of King Laomedon of Troy. He fought alongside his half-brother, Ajax, in the Trojan War and is the legendary founder of the city of Salamis on Cyprus. Through his mother, Teucer was the nephew of King Priam of Troy and the cousin of Hector and Paris—all of whom he fought against in the Trojan War.

== Myths ==
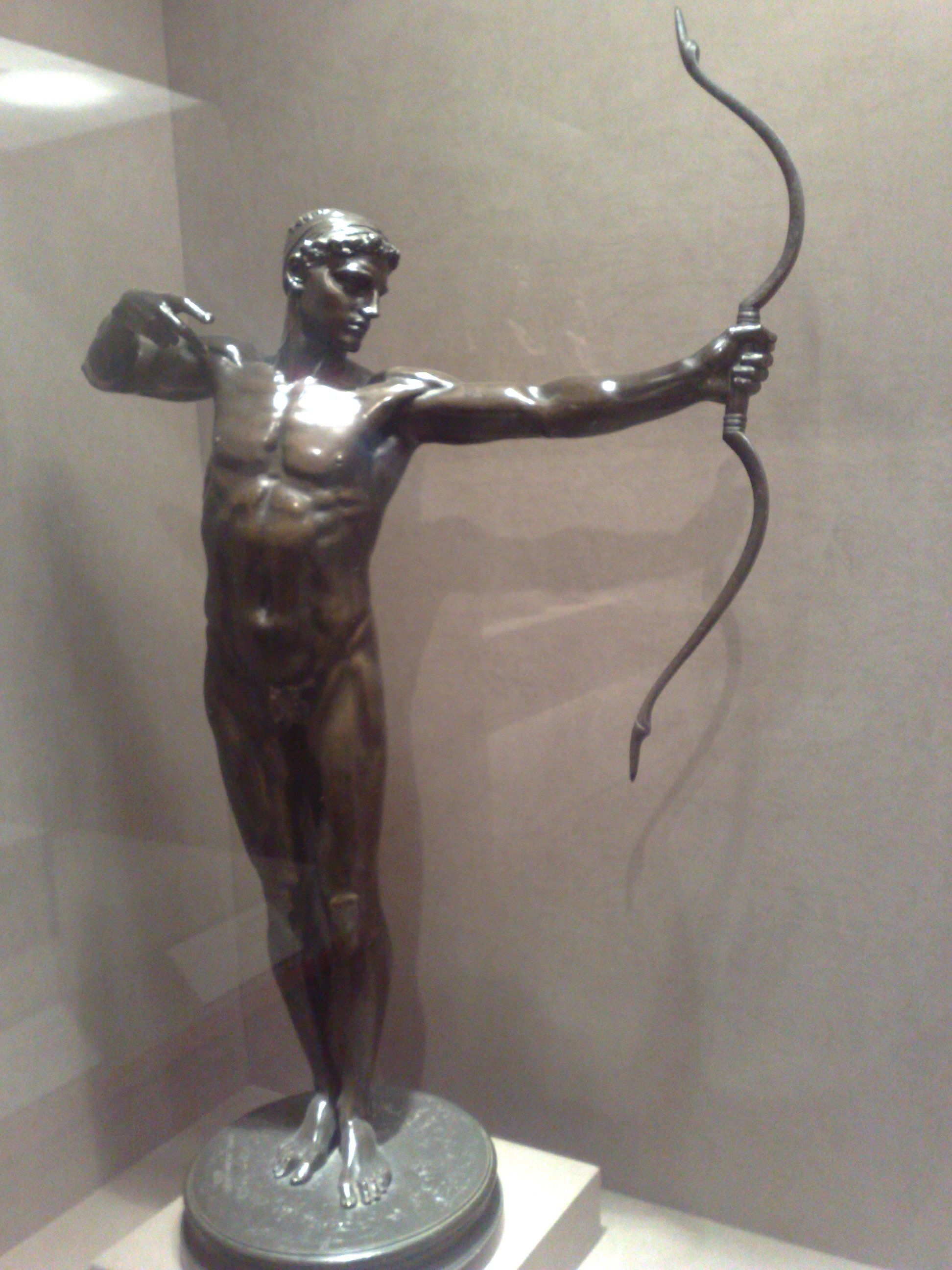
Statue of Teucer by Sir William Hamo Thornycroft

During the Trojan War, Teucer was mainly a great archer, who loosed his shafts from behind the giant shield of his half-brother Ajax the Great. When Hector was driving the Achaeans back toward their ships, Teucer gave the Argives some success by killing many of the charging Trojans, including Hector's charioteer, Archeptolemus son of Iphitos. However, every time he shot an arrow at Hector, Apollo, the protector of the Trojans, would foil the shot. At one point in his rage at Teucer's success, Hector picked up a huge rock and flung it at him. The rock injured Teucer, so that he retired from the fighting for a time. He took up a spear to fight in the war after his bow was broken by Zeus. He once again challenged Hector, and narrowly avoided the path of Hector's flying javelin in the ensuing battle. He was also one of the Danaans to enter the Trojan Horse. In total, Teucer slew thirty Trojans during the war; of those Homer mentions Aretaon, Orsilochus, Ormenus, Ophelestes, Daetor, Chromius, Lycophontes, Amopaon, Melanippus, Prothoon and Periphetes, as well as the aforementioned Archeptolemus. He also wounded Glaucus, son of Hippolochus.

After Ajax's suicide, Teucer guarded the body to make sure it was buried, insulting Menelaus and Agamemnon when they tried to stop the burial. Finally, Odysseus persuaded Agamemnon to let the burial happen. Because of his half-brother's suicide, Teucer stood trial before his father, where he was found guilty of negligence for not bringing his dead half-brother's body or his arms back with him. He was disowned by his father, was not allowed back on Salamis Island, and set out to find a new home. His departing words were introduced in the seventh ode of the first book of the Roman poet Horace's Odes, in which he exhorts his companions "nil desperandum", "do not despair", and announces "cras ingens iterabimus aequor", "tomorrow we shall set out upon the vast ocean". This speech has been given a wider applicability in relation to the theme of voyages of discovery, also found in the Ulysses of Tennyson.

Teucer eventually joined King Belus of Tyre in his campaign against Cyprus, and when the island was seized, Belus handed it over to him in reward for his assistance. Teucer founded the city of Salamis on Cyprus, which he named after his home state. He further married Eune, daughter of Cinyras, king of Cyprus, and had by her a daughter Asteria. Anaxarete of Cyprus was called "a proud princess in the line of Teucer's descendants".

The name Teucer is believed to be related to the name of the West Hittite God Tarku (East Hittite Teshub)—the Indo-European Storm God—a role which explains his relationship to Belus, who is associated with the Carthaginian god Baal Hammon.

Local legends of the city of Pontevedra (Galicia) relate the foundation of this city to Teucer (Teucro), although this seems to be based more on the suspicions that Greek traders might have reached that area in ancient times, hence introducing a number of Greek stories. The city is sometimes poetically called "The City of Teucer" and its inhabitants teucrinos. A number of sporting clubs in the municipality use names related to Teucer. Some versions of the legend say that Teucer reached Galicia by following a sea nymph or mermaid called Leucoina, while others point to her as the cause of his death, when the hero drowned trying to reach her.

The Lindos Chronicle records a dedication attributed to Teucer, who is said to have dedicated a quiver and a bow at the temple to Athena at Lindos. The quiver bore the inscription, "Teucer, the (quiver) of Pandaros".
