= Britomart =

Britomart may refer to:

- Britomartis, a nymph of Greek mythology
- A character in Edmund Spenser's epic poem The Faerie Queene
- Lady Britomart Undershaft, a character in George Bernard Shaw's play, Major Barbara.
- HMS Britomart, seven ships of the Royal Navy
- G-ACOY Britomart, a Boulton & Paul P.71A mailplane
- LNWR Experiment Class 4-6-0 No. 2645 Britomart
- A Hunslet quarry locomotive named Britomart
- Point Britomart, a former headland between former Commercial Bay, and Official Bay, Auckland, New Zealand
  - Britomart Transport Centre (Now known as Waitematā railway station), Auckland's CBD public transport hub, located in the area of the former headland
  - Fort Britomart, a fortification of the British Army during early colonial days, located on the headland
