= Cydon =

Various mythological figures

In Greek mythology, the name Cydon (Ancient Greek: Κύδων) may refer to:

- Cydon of Crete, eponym of Cydonia. According to one version, he was a son of Tegeates and possibly, Maera, daughter of the Titan Atlas. He was the brother of Leimon, Schephrus, Gortys and Archedius: the three brothers were said to have migrated to Crete from Arcadia. Alternately, Cydon was a native of Crete, son of Acacallis by Hermes or Apollo. He is probably the same as Cydon, the father of Eulimene. The town of Cydonia was named after him.
- Cydon of Thebes, name shared by three defenders of Thebes in the war of the Seven against Thebes:
  - One of the fifty warriors who laid an ambush against Tydeus and were killed by him.
  - Son of Abas, was killed by Parthenopaeus.
  - Another Theban, killed by Hippomedon.
- Cydon of Lemnos, half-brother of Hypsipyle. Was slain by Myrmidone the night all Lemnian men were killed by their women.
- Cydon, an ally of Turnus, lover of Clytius. Clytius fell in the battle against Aeneas.
- Cydon, one of the horses of Hippodamus.
