= List of deified people in Greek mythology =

The Greek pantheon of gods included mortal-born heroes and heroines who were elevated to godhood through a process which the Greeks termed apotheosis. Some of these received the privilege as a reward for their helpfulness to mankind example: Heracles, Asclepius and Aristaeus, others through marriage to gods, example: Ariadne, Tithonus and Psyche, and some by luck or pure chance example: Glaucus.

== List ==
Name	Parents	Notes	Sources
Dionysus	Zeus and Semele	Also an Olympian	
Ariadne	Minos and Pasiphaë		
Heracles	Zeus and Alcmene	Also the Protector of Mankind and the Patron of Gymnasiums	
Leucothea	Cadmus and Harmonia		
Palaemon	Athamas & Leucothea	Palaemon's sacred animal was the dolphin	
Ganymede	Tros and Callirhoe		
Asclepius	Apollo and Coronis		
Aristaeus	Apollo and Cyrene	Also the patron of oil milling, medicinal herbs, hunting, and the Etesian winds	
Attis	Galaos		
Bolina		Transformed into a nymph by Apollo	
Britomartis	Zeus and Carme		
Endymion	Aethlius and Calyce	Granted immortality in eternal sleep	
Glaucus	Poseidon	Became immortal after eating a herb which was sowed by Kronos.	
Hemithea	Staphylus or Apollo and Khrysothemis		
Hyacinthus	Amyclas and Diomede		
Leucippides (Phoebe and Hilaeira)	Leucippus or Apollo		
Orithyia	Erechtheus and Praxithea		
Parthenos	Staphylus or Apollo and Khrysothemis	Hunter of Artemis	
Phylonoe	Tyndareus and Leda	Hunter of Artemis	
Semele (or Thyone)	Cadmus and Harmonia	Made immortal by her son Dionysus after she died.	
Triptolemos	Celeus and Metanira	One of the gods involved in the Eleusinian Mysteries	
Trophonius	Apollo	A seer transformed into an immortal Daimon	
Iphigenia (also known as Orsilokhia )	Agamemnon and Clytemnestra	Priestess of Artemis	
Acis	Pan and Symaethis	One of the river gods	
Alcyone and Ceyx	Aeolus and Enarete (Alcyone), Eosphorus (Ceyx)		
Cleitus	Mantius		
Memnon	Eos and Tithonus	Fought in the Trojan War	
Lampsace	Mandron		
