= Eubuleus =

Greek mythical character

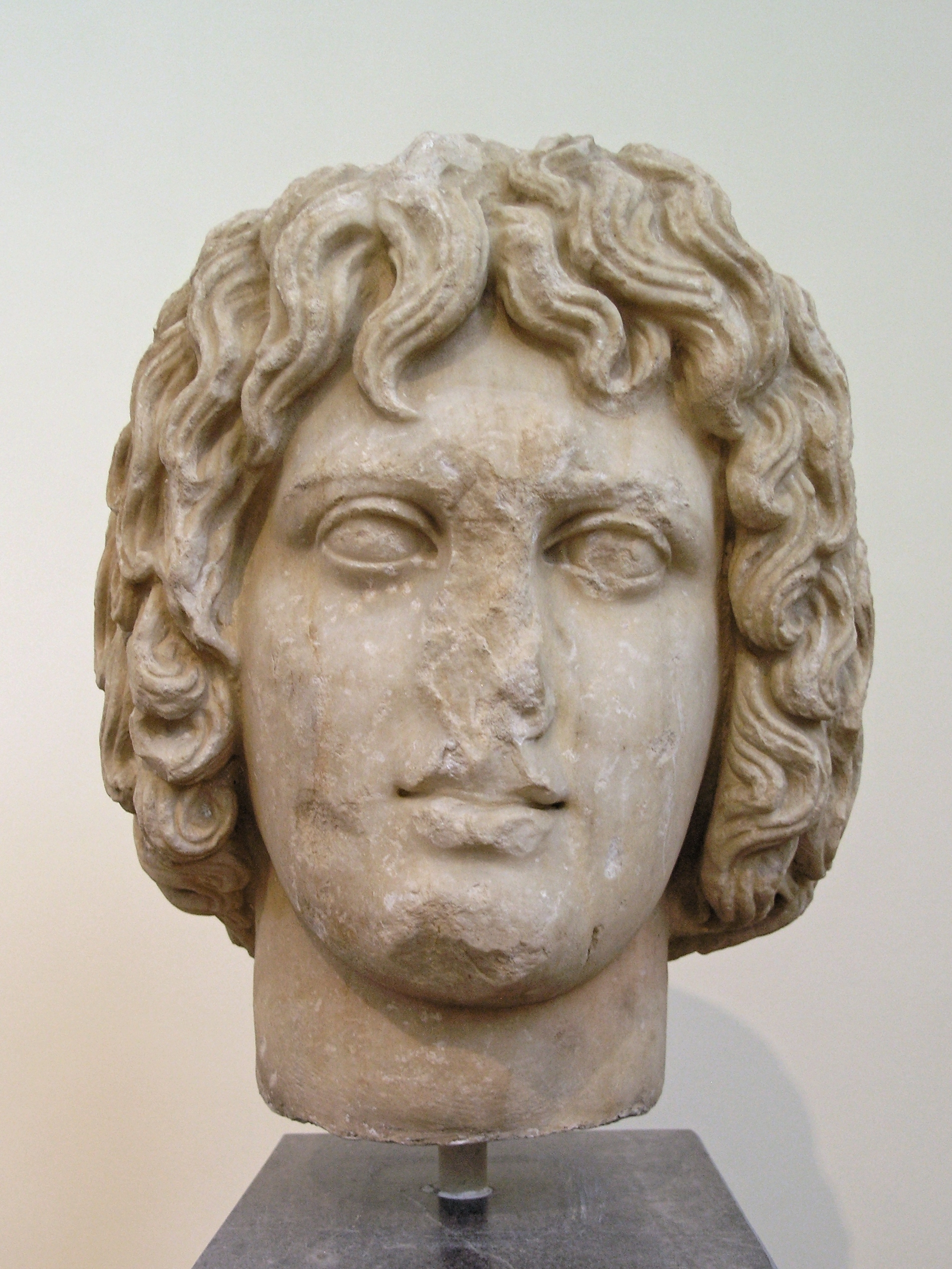
This marble head, sometimes thought to be the work of Praxiteles, probably depicts Eubuleus

In ancient Greek religion and myth, Eubuleus or Eubouleus (Ancient Greek Εὐβουλεύς Eubouleus means "good counsel" or "wise in counsel") is a god known primarily from devotional inscriptions for mystery religions. The name appears several times in the corpus of the so-called Orphic gold tablets spelled variously, with forms including Euboulos, Eubouleos and Eubolos. It may be an epithet of the central Orphic god, Dionysus or Zagreus, or of Zeus in an unusual association with the Eleusinian Mysteries. Scholars of the late 20th and early 21st centuries have begun to consider Eubuleus independently as "a major god" of the mysteries, based on his prominence in the inscriptional evidence. His depiction in art as a torchbearer suggests that his role was to lead the way back from the underworld.

== Genealogy and identity ==
Literary texts provide only scant evidence of the mythology of Eubuleus. He is not mentioned in the Homeric Hymn to Demeter. Differences among genealogies and cross-identifications with other gods raise the question of whether all the sources using a form of the name refer to the same figure. Diodorus Siculus says that he was a son of Demeter and the father of Karme, thus grandfather of Britomartis. One of the Orphic tablets identifies him as the son of Zeus, as does one of the Orphic Hymns. Hesychius identifies him with Plouton, who is also hailed as Euboulos in the Orphic Hymn to Plouton, but other contexts distinguish the two.

== In art ==
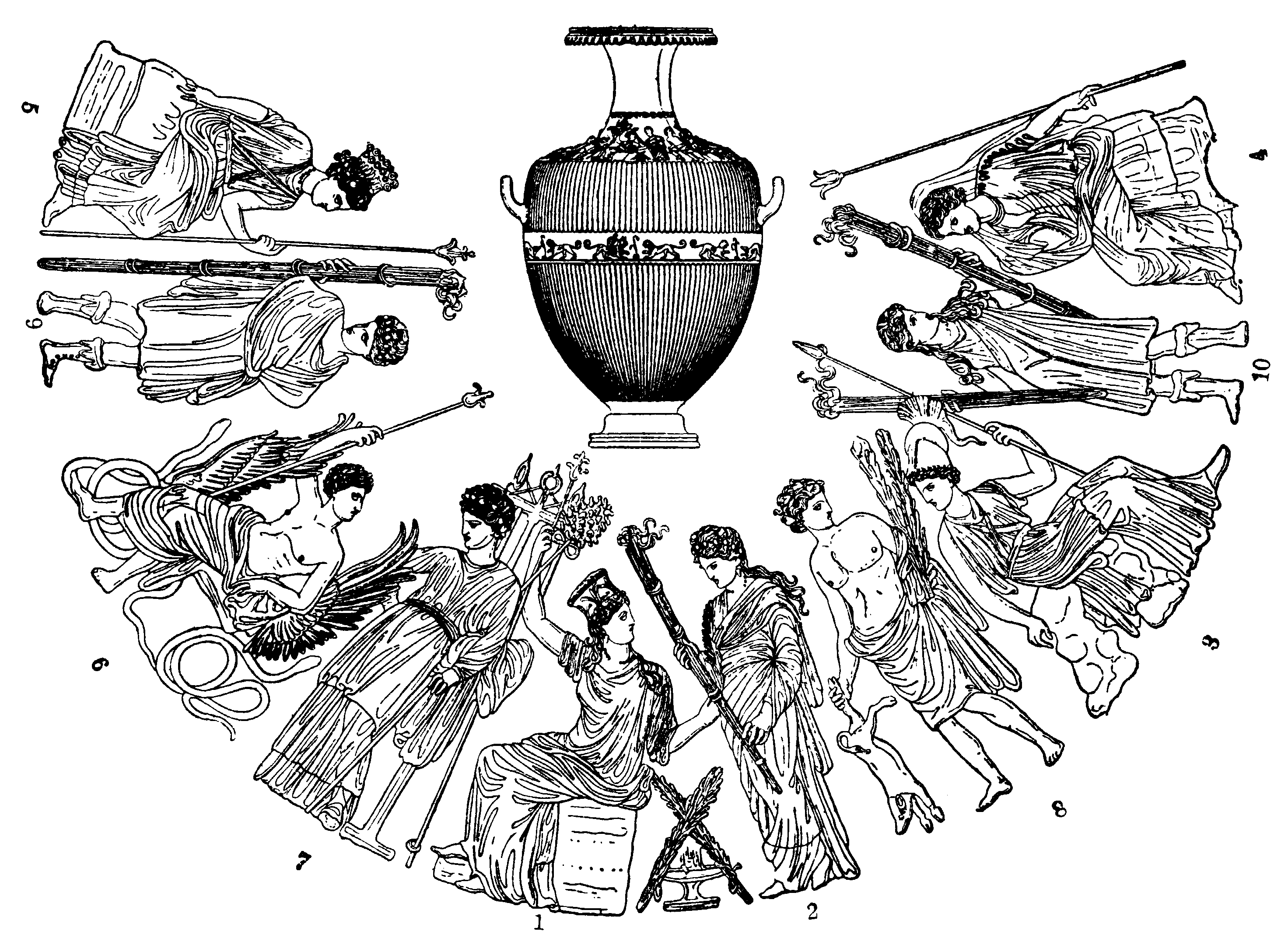
In this drawing of figures around the neck of the "Queen of Vases" (pictured center), the bare-chested pig-bearer at position 8 is most likely Eubuleus

In visual representations, Eubuleus resembles Iacchos. Both are often depicted with a "dreamy" or "mystical" expression, and long hair styled in a particular manner. Both figures can also be represented as torchbearers. Eubuleus is sometimes identified as one of the figures on the so-called Regina Vasorum ("Queen of Vases"), a mid-4th-century BC hydria from Cumae that depicts various figures from Eleusinian myth.

A sculptural head most often attributed to the Athenian artist Praxiteles has sometimes been identified as Eubuleus. Uncovered by archaeologists in 1883 in the Ploutonion of Eleusis, it may instead represent Triptolemus. Alternatively, the head could be an idealized portrait of the type frequently made of Alexander, perhaps of Demetrius Poliorcetes, as it agrees in respects with Plutarch's description. The identification as Eubuleus is based on comparisons with other sculptural heads that have the name inscribed, and the presence of the name on a base found separately but also within the Eleusinian Ploutonion.

Eubuleus is also identified as the youthful figure holding a torch on the right side of the fragmentary Lacrateides Relief, a second-century BC votive relief found in Eleusis. The Hellenistic marble relief is probably the earliest artistic appearance of Eubuleus.

== Myth ==
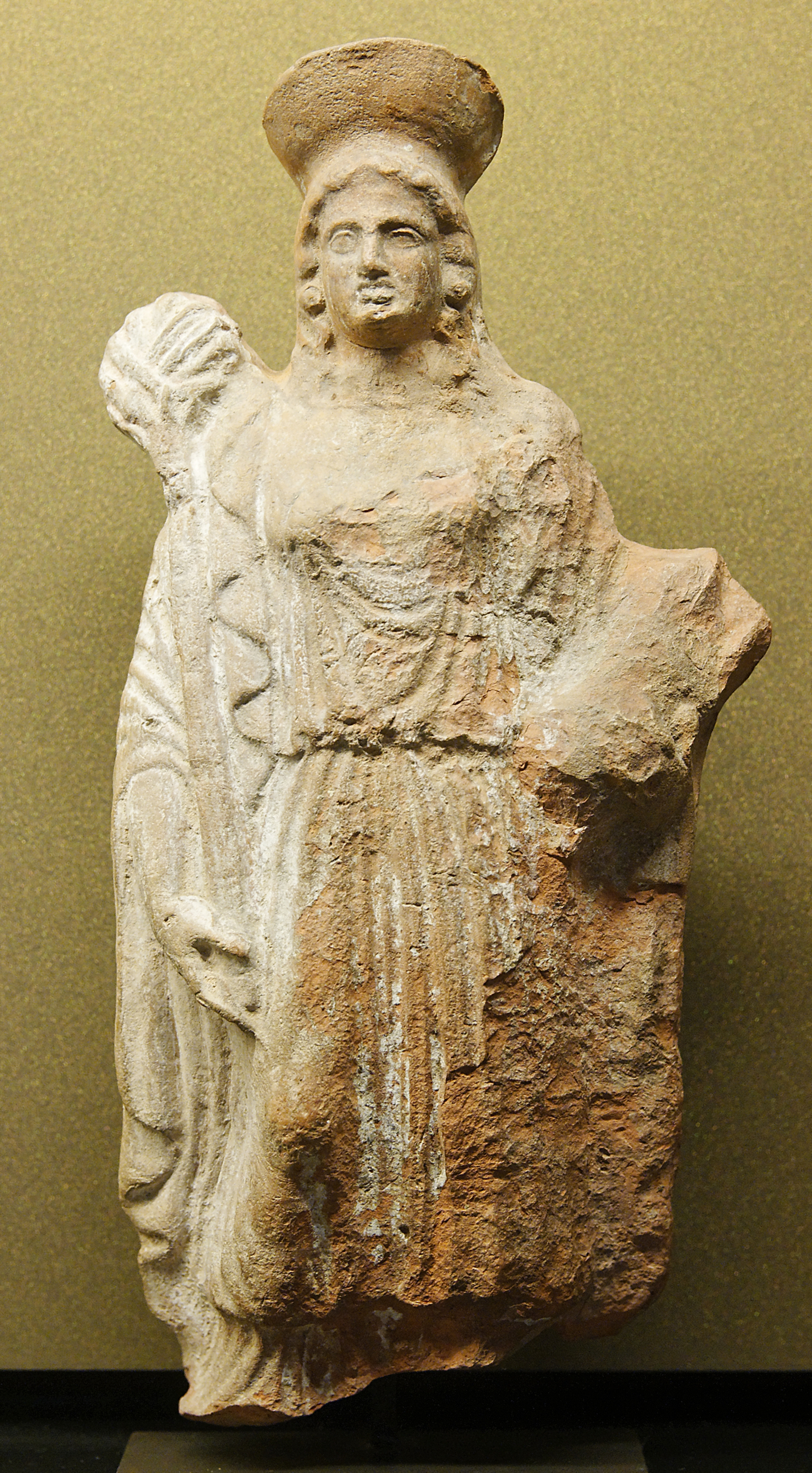
Female attendant carrying piglet and torch, a terracotta figurine from Eleusis

The Scholia to Lucian say that Eubuleus was a swineherd who was feeding his pigs at the opening to the underworld when Persephone was abducted by Hades. His swine were swallowed by the earth along with her. The scholiast presents this narrative element as an aition for the ritual at the Thesmophoria in which piglets are thrown into a sacrificial pit (megara) dedicated to Demeter and Persephone. Ritual attendants called "bailers" (ἀντλήτριαι, antlêtriai) then descended into the pit and retrieved the decayed remains, which were placed on altars, mixed with seeds, then planted. Pits rich in organic matter at Eleusis have been taken as evidence that the Thesmophoria was held there as well as in other demes of Attica.

In keeping with his ritualist approach to myth and other preoccupations in The Golden Bough, J.G. Frazer thought that the pigs, rather than merely accompanying Persephone in her descent, were an original feature of the story, representing the "corn spirit" that was later anthropomorphized as the young goddess.

== Cult role ==
The "First Fruits Decree" (5th century BC) requires sacrifices for Demeter and Kore ("the Maiden," usually identified with Persephone), Triptolemus, Theos (God), Thea (Goddess) and Eubolos. The inscription with the Lakrateides relief identifies the person making the dedication as a priest of the God and Goddess — that is, of the King and Queen of the Underworld, in reference to mystery cult — and of Eubouleus. In the Orphic tablets, Eubuleus is invoked four times along with Eucles ("Good Fame"), following a declaration in the first line to the Queen of the Underworld, Persephone. He is also invoked in the Gurôb Papyrus of the mid-3rd century BC.

Because Eubuleus seems to be a human being in the narrative alluded to by the scholiast to Lucian, he has sometimes been considered a hero who received cult veneration, as are Triptolemus and even Iacchos.
