= Metus =

Metus may refer to:

- Metus (fungus), lichenized fungi in the family Cladoniaceae
- Metus (mythology), the son of Poseidon and Melite in Greek mythology
- Metus or Deimos (deity), the personification of terror in Roman and Greek mythology
