= Cymodoce =

Cymodoce may refer to:

- Cymodoce (crustacean), a genus of isopod in the family Sphaeromatidae
- Cymodoce (mythology), a Nereid (sea nymph) in Greek mythology

== See also ==
- Cymodocea, a genus of grass
