= Melite (mythology) =

Greek mythological figures

Melite or Melita (/ˈmɛlɪtiː/; Ancient Greek: Μελίτη, romanized: Melitê, lit. 'calm, honey sweet' or 'glorious, splendid') was the name of several characters in Greek mythology:

- Melita, one of the 3,000 Oceanids, water-nymph daughters of the Titans Oceanus and his sister-spouse Tethys. She was one of the companions of Persephone along with her sisters when the daughter of Demeter was abducted by Hades.
- Melite or Melie, the "gracious" Nereid of the calm seas. She was a sea-nymph daughter of the "Old Man of the Sea" Nereus and the Oceanid Doris. Melite and her other sisters appear to Thetis when she cries out in sympathy for the grief of Achilles at the slaying of his friend Patroclus. Later on, together with her sisters Thaleia, Speio, Cymodoce, Nesaea, Panopea and Thetis, they were able to help the hero Aeneas and his crew during a storm.
- Melite, naiad daughter of the river god Aegaeus and mother of Hyllus by Heracles.
- Melite, one of the Erasinides, four naiad daughters of the Argive river-god Erasinus. Together with her sisters, Anchiroe, Byze and Maera, they became the followers of Britomartis.
- Melite, an Egyptian princess as the daughter of King Busiris and possible sister of Amphidamas. She was the mother of Metus by Poseidon.
- Melite or Meta, daughter of Hoples and the first wife of Aegeus.
- Melite, eponym of a deme in Attica.
- Melite, one of the sacrificial victims of the Minotaur, and the daughter of Thriagonos.
