= Archedius =

In Greek mythology, Archedius (Ancient Greek: Ἀρχήδιον) was an Arcadian prince as son of King Tegeates of Tegea and Maera, daughter of the Titan Atlas. He was the brother of Scephrus, Leimon, Gortys, and Cydon. Together with the last two brothers, they migrated to Crete on their own free will and that after them were named the cities Cydonia, Gortyna and Catreus.
