= Gortys (mythology) =

Several figures in Greek mythology

In Greek mythology, Gortys (Ancient Greek: Γόρτυνα) may refer to the following Arcadian princes:

- Gortys, son of King Tegeates of Tegea and Maera, daughter of the Titan Atlas. He was the brother of Scephrus, Leimon, Archedius, and Cydon. Together with the last two brothers, they migrated to Crete on their own free will and that after them were named the cities Cydonia, Gortyna and Catreus. In some accounts, Gortys was called the son of Rhadamanthys, son of Europa and Zeus.
- Gortys, founder of the city Gortys in Arcadia on a river which was also called after him. He was son of King Stymphalus and brother of Agamedes.
