= Maera (mythology) =

Multiple figures in Greek mythology

In Greek mythology, Maera or Maira (Ancient Greek: Μαῖρα, romanized: Maira) may refer to the following personages:

Humans

- Maera or Mera, one of the 50 Nereids, sea-nymph daughters of the "Old Man of the Sea" Nereus and the Oceanid Doris. She and her other sisters appear to Thetis when she cries out in sympathy for the grief of Achilles at the slaying of his friend Patroclus.
- Maera, daughter of Atlas and ancestor of the below Maera. She was the mother by Tegeates, of Leimon, Scephrus, Archedius, Gortys, and Cydon.
- Maera, descendant of the above Maera.
- Maera, daughter of Proetus, son of Thersander, son of Sisyphus, was still a maid when she died. Otherwise, she was the mother of Locrus by Zeus. In some accounts, Locrus' mother was Megaclite, daughter of Macareus. Maera's shade appeared to Odysseus when the hero visited the underworld.
- Maera, one of the Erasinides, Argive naiad daughters of the river-god Erasinus. She and her sisters, Anchiroe, Byze and Melite, received Britomartis.
- Maera, priestess of Aphrodite, and mother of two sons killed by Tydeus during the war of the Seven Against Thebes.

Animal

- Maera, name of Hecabe when she was changed into the black bitch of Hecate to spread terror among the Thracians with her howling.
- Maera, hound of Erigone.
