= Leimon (mythology) =

Arcadian prince in Greek mythology

In Greek mythology, Leimon (Ancient Greek: Λειμὼν means 'meadow') was an Arcadian prince as the son of King Tegeates of Tegea and Maera, daughter of the Titan Atlas. He was the brother of Scephrus, Archedius, Gortys and Cydon.

== Mythology ==
When Apollo and Artemis visited the land of Tegea, Leimon suspected that his brother Scephrus plotted against him during a private conversation with the god. Leimon rushed on his brother and slayed him. To punish the murder of Scephrus, Artemis shot Leimon afterwards.
