= Spio =

Nereid in Greek mythology

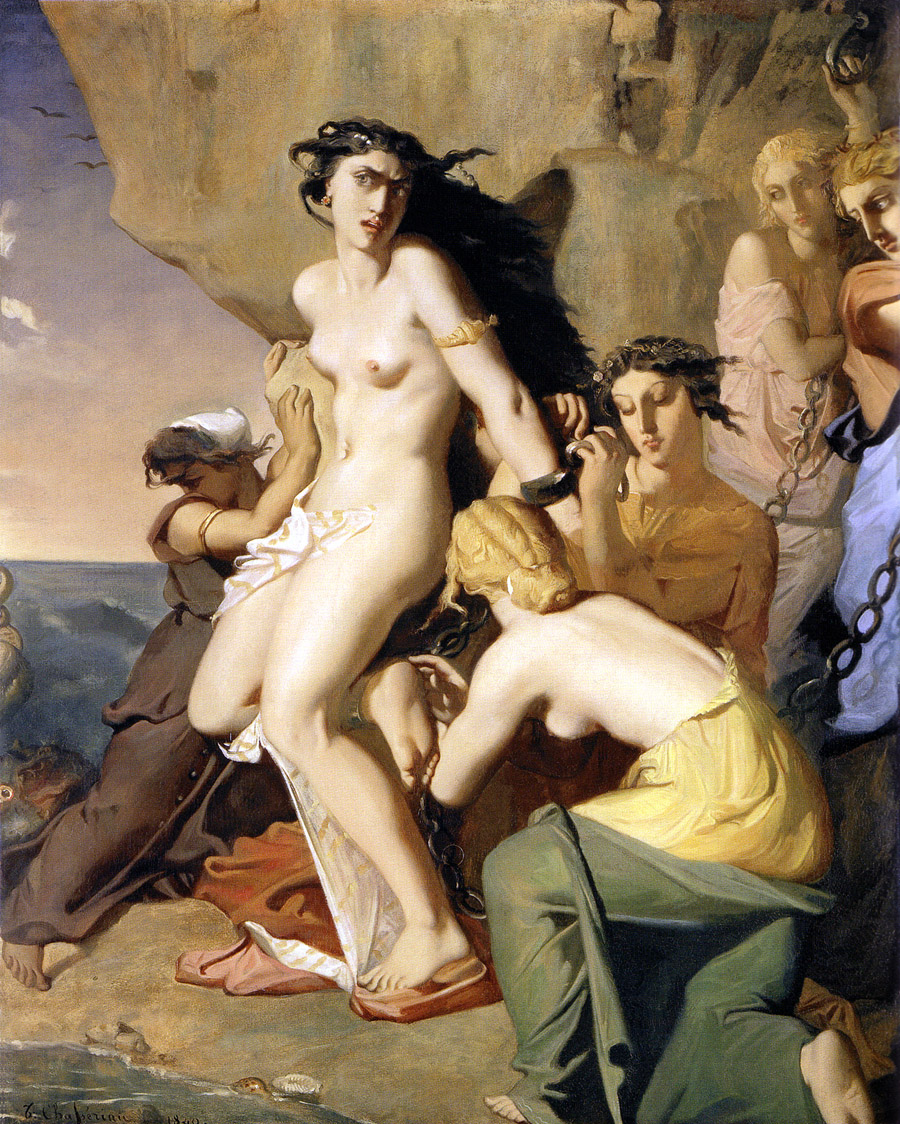
Andromeda Chained to the Rock by the Nereids by Théodore Chassériau (1840). Oil on canvas, 92 x 74 cm (36.2 x 29.1 in). Louvre, Paris

In Greek mythology, Spio (Ancient Greek: Σπειώ means 'the dweller in the caves') was one of the 50 Nereids, marine-nymph daughters of the "Old Man of the Sea" Nereus and the Oceanid Doris. Variations of her name were Speio and Speo.

== Mythology ==
Speio and her other sisters appear to Thetis when she cries out in sympathy for the grief of Achilles at the slaying of his friend Patroclus.

In some accounts, Spio, together with her sisters Cymodoce, Nesaea and Thalia, was one of the nymphs in the train of Cyrene. Later on, these four together with their other sisters Thetis, Melite and Panopea, were able to help the hero Aeneas and his crew during a storm.
