= Erasinos =

Greek mythologcal character

In Greek mythology, Erasinus or Erasinos (Ancient Greek: Ἐρασῖνος) was a river god of Arkadia and Argos in southern Greece. His daughters Byze, Melite, Maera and Anchiroe. The river itself appears in Pausanias' Description of Greece.

== Mythology ==
Erasinus's only appearance in myth was recounted by Antoninus Liberalis in his Metamorphoses, where he was mentioned as the father of the above daughters who received Britomartis when she fled from King Minos of Crete.

"First she [ie. Britomartis] arrived in Argos from Phoenicia, entering into the company of the daughters of Erasinos, Byze, Melite, Maira, and Ankhirhoe (Anchirhoe)."
