= Mount Tityros =

Mountain in Greece

Mount Tityros is a hill landform in western Crete in the vicinity of the modern-day city of Chania, Greece. In ancient times Mount Tityros was associated with the early Cretan city of Kydonia. Residents of the ancient city of Kydonia dedicated a temple to the goddess Britomartis on Mount Tityros.

== See also ==
- Britomartis
