= Tegeates =

Mythological Greek figure

In Greek mythology, Tegeates (Ancient Greek: Τεγεάτης) was an Arcadian prince as son of King Lycaon, and the reputed eponymous founder and of Tegea.

== Family ==
Tegeates was married to Maera, daughter of Atlas, by whom he had five sons: Archedius, Gortys, Cydon, Leimon and Scephrus; Tegeates' and Maera's tombs were shown at Tegea. Of their children, the following is related.

== Mythology ==
When Apollo and Artemis were traveling about Greece in search for those who had once refused their mother Leto to punish them, they came to Tegea, where Apollo had a private conversation with Scephrus. Leimon, suspecting that his brother was charging against him, killed Scephrus. For his crime, Leimon was shot by Artemis; afterwards, despite Tegeates and Maera offering sacrifices to propitiate the gods, famine fell on the land. To avert the calamity, rites in honor of Scephrus were instituted and have since then been performed during the festival of Apollo Agyieus: as part of the ritual, a priestess of Artemis pursued a man, imitating Artemis' pursuit of Leimon. The other three sons of Tegeates, Archedius, Gortys and Cydon, were said to have migrated to Crete and to have founded the cities Cydonia, Gortys and Catreus.
