= Apotheosis =

Glorification of a subject to divine level

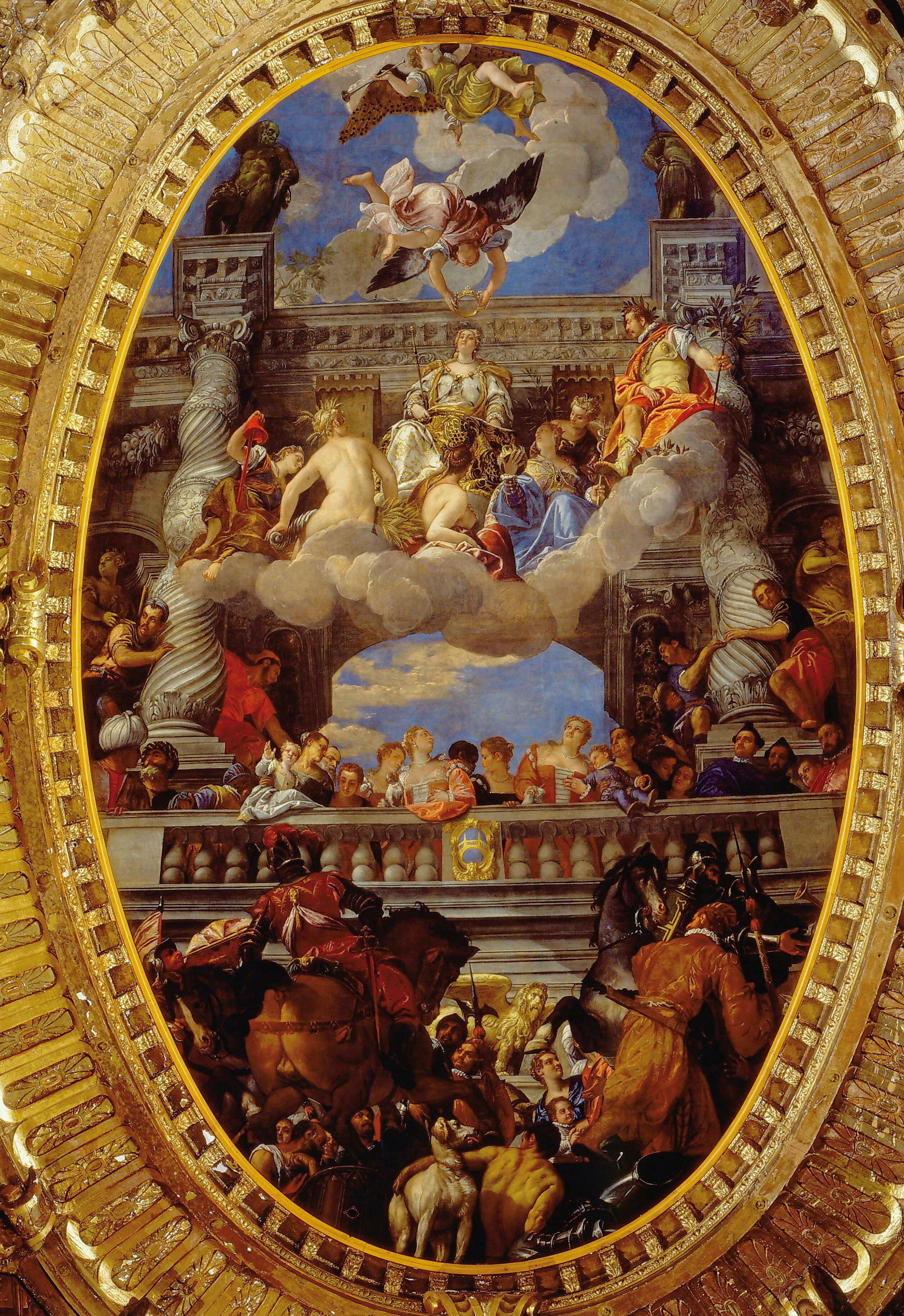
Apotheosis of Venice (1585) by Paolo Veronese, a ceiling in the Doge's Palace

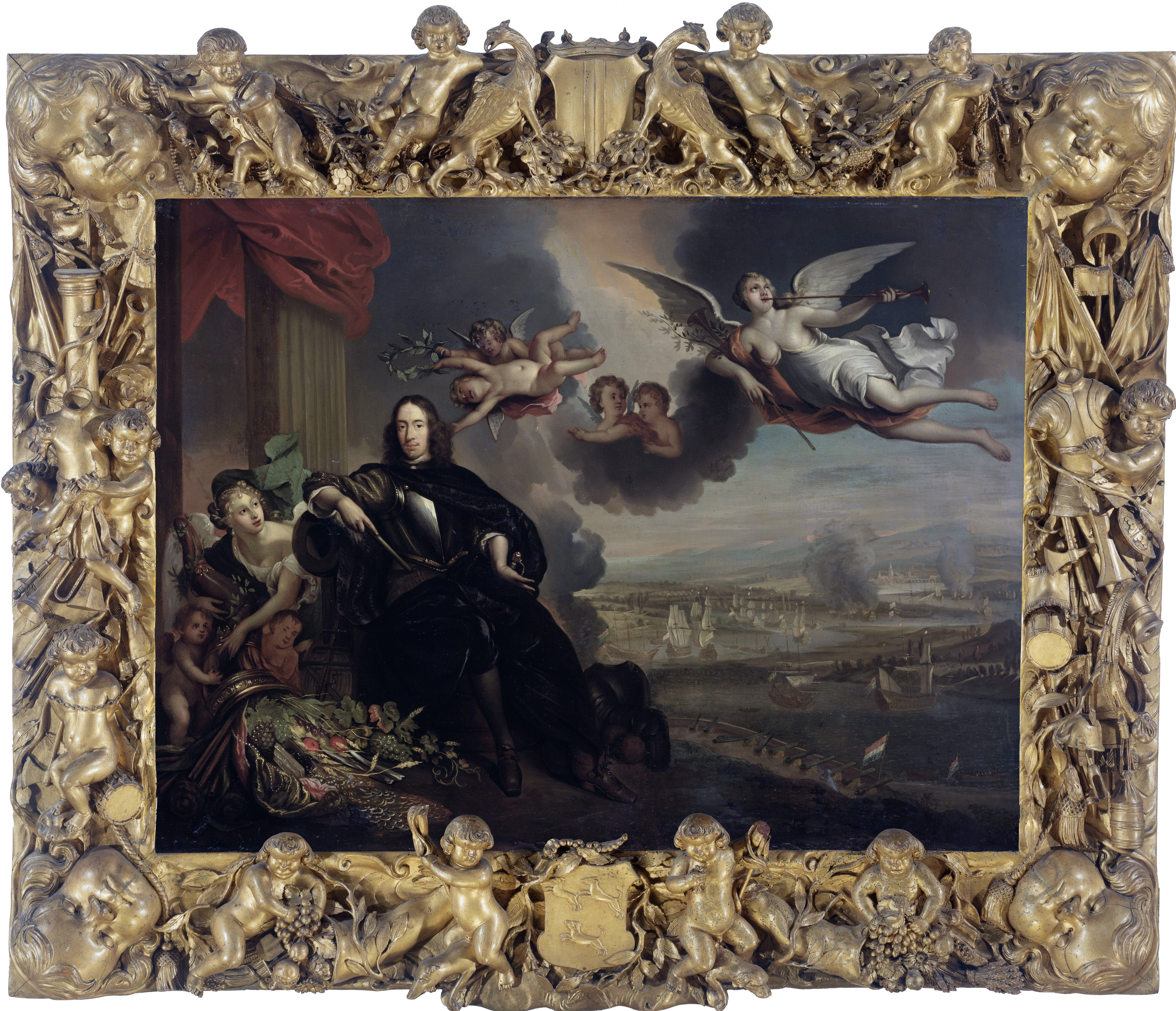
The Apotheosis of Cornelis de Witt, with the Raid on Chatham in the background

Apotheosis (from Ancient Greek ἀποθέωσις (apothéōsis), from ἀποθεόω/ἀποθεῶ (apotheóō/apotheô) 'to deify'), also called divinization or deification (from Latin deificatio 'making divine'), is the glorification of a subject to divine levels and, commonly, the treatment of a human being, any other living thing, or an abstract idea in the likeness of a deity.

Apotheosis relates to religion and is the subject of many works of art. Figuratively, "apotheosis" may be used in almost any context for "the deification, glorification, or exaltation of a principle, practice, etc.", so normally attached to an abstraction of some sort.

Apotheosis is a feature of many religions in the world, and some that are active today. It is a belief in a possibility of newly created gods, so a polytheistic belief system. The Abrahamic religions of Islam and Judaism do not allow for this, though many recognize minor sacred categories such as saints (created by a process called canonization). In Christian theology there is a concept of the faithful becoming god-like, called divinization or, in Eastern Christianity, theosis. In Hinduism there is some scope for new deities. A human may be deified by becoming regarded as an avatar of an established deity, usually a major one, or by being regarded as a new, independent, deity (usually a minor one), or some mixture of the two.

In art, an apotheosis scene typically shows the subject in the heavens or rising towards them, often accompanied by a number of angels, putti, personifications of virtues, or similar figures. Especially from Baroque art onwards, apotheosis scenes may depict rulers, generals or artists purely as an honorific metaphor; in many cases the "religious" context is classical Greco-Roman pagan religion, as in The Apotheosis of Voltaire, featuring Apollo. The Apotheosis of Washington (1865), high up in the dome of the United States Capitol Building, is another example. Personifications of places or abstractions are also showed receiving an apotheosis. The typical composition was suitable for placement on ceilings or inside domes.

== Ancient Egypt ==
Before the Hellenistic period, imperial cults were known in ancient Egypt (pharaohs) and Mesopotamia (from Naram-Sin through Hammurabi). In the New Kingdom of Egypt, all dead pharaohs were deified as the god Osiris, having been identified as Horus while on the throne, and sometimes referred to as the "son" of various other deities.

The architect Imhotep was deified after his death, though the process seems to have been gradual, taking well over a thousand years, by which time he had become associated primarily with medicine. About a dozen non-royal ancient Egyptians became regarded as deities.

== Ancient Greece ==
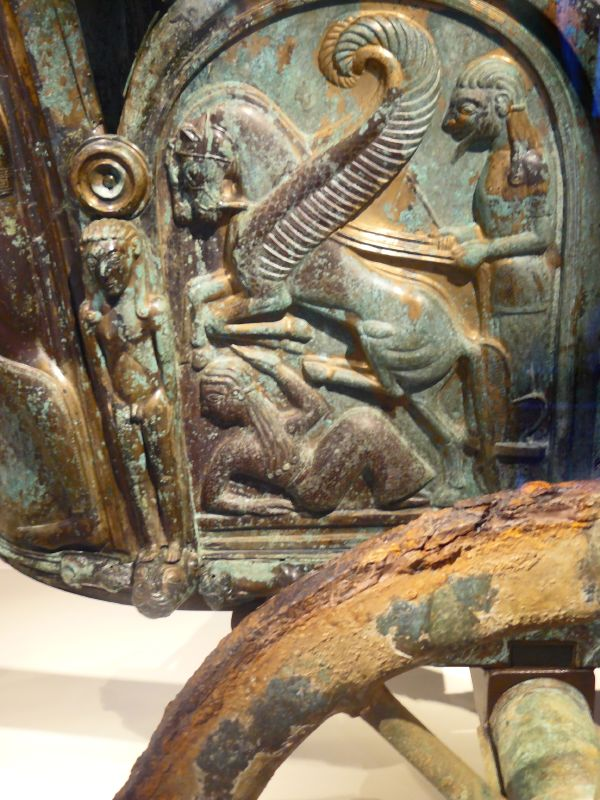
The Apotheosis of Achilles, from the Monteleone Chariot, Etruscan, 6th century BC

Ancient Greek religion and its Roman equivalent have many figures who were born as humans but became gods, for example Hercules. They are typically made divine by one of the main deities, the Twelve Olympians. In the Roman story Cupid and Psyche, Zeus gives the ambrosia of the gods to the mortal Psyche, turning her into a goddess. In the case of the Hellenistic queen Berenice II of Egypt, herself deified like other rulers of the Ptolemaic dynasty, the court propagated a myth that her hair, cut off to fulfill a vow, had its own apotheosis before becoming the Coma Berenices, a group of stars that still bear her name.

From at least the Geometric period of the ninth century BC, the long-deceased heroes linked with founding myths of Greek sites were accorded chthonic rites in their heroon, or "hero-temple".

In the Greek world, the first leader who accorded himself divine honours was Philip II of Macedon. At his wedding to his sixth wife, Philip's enthroned image was carried in procession among the Olympian gods; "his example at Aigai became a custom, passing to the Macedonian kings who were later worshipped in Greek Asia, from them to Julius Caesar and so to the emperors of Rome". Such Hellenistic state leaders might be raised to a status equal to the gods before death (e.g., Alexander the Great) or afterwards (e.g., members of the Ptolemaic dynasty). A heroic cult status similar to apotheosis was also an honour given to a few revered artists of the distant past, notably Homer.

Archaic and Classical Greek hero-cults became primarily civic, extended from their familial origins, in the sixth century; by the fifth century none of the worshipers based their authority by tracing descent back to the hero, with the exception of some families who inherited particular priestly cults, such as the Eumolpides (descended from Eumolpus) of the Eleusinian Mysteries, and some inherited priesthoods at oracle sites.

The Greek hero cults can be distinguished on the other hand from the Roman cult of dead emperors, because the hero was not thought of as having ascended to Olympus or become a god: he was beneath the earth, and his power purely local. For this reason, hero cults were chthonic in nature, and their rituals more closely resembled those for Hecate and Persephone than those for Zeus and Apollo. Two exceptions were Heracles and Asclepius, who might be honoured as either gods or heroes, sometimes by chthonic night-time rites and sacrifice on the following day. One god considered as a hero to humankind is Prometheus, who secretly stole fire from Mount Olympus and introduced it to humankind.

Some mystery cults, such as the Dionysian Mysteries, allowed those initiated into the cult to become gods during the initiation ceremony as is evidenced by the Orphic-Bacchic gold tablets.

== Ancient Rome ==
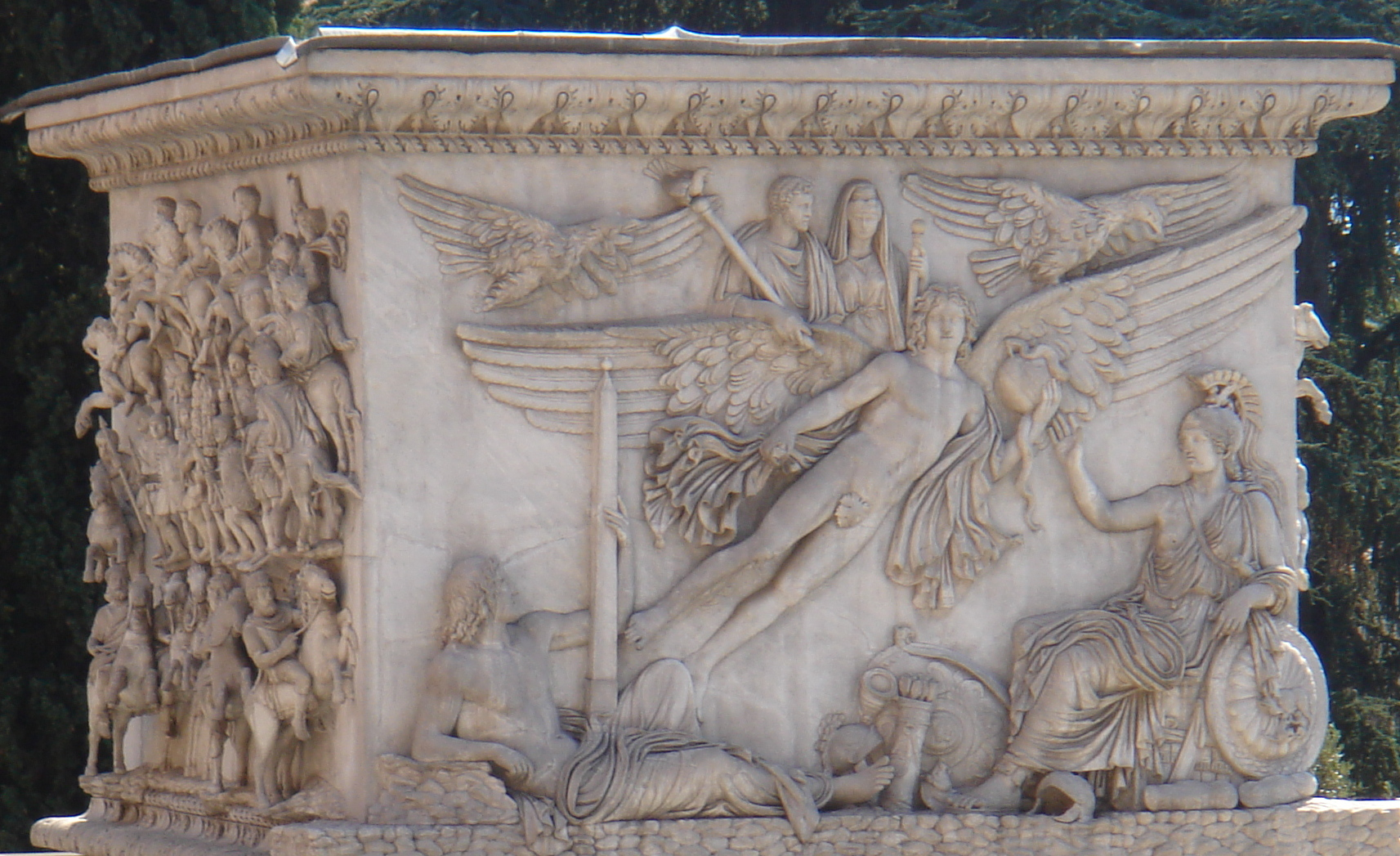
Apotheosis of Emperor Antoninus Pius (d. 161) and his wife Faustina the Elder (d. c. 140), base of his column in Rome

Up to the end of the Republic, the god Quirinus was the only one the Romans accepted as having undergone apotheosis, for his identification/syncretism with Romulus (see Euhemerism). Subsequently, apotheosis in ancient Rome was a process whereby a deceased ruler was recognized as divine by his successor, usually also by a decree of the Senate and popular consent. The first of these cases was the posthumous deification of the last Roman dictator Julius Caesar in 42 BC by his adopted son, the triumvir Caesar Octavian. In addition to showing respect, often the present ruler deified a popular predecessor to legitimize himself and gain popularity with the people.

A vote in the Roman Senate, in the later Empire confirming an imperial decree, was the normal official process, but this sometimes followed a period with the unofficial use of deific language or imagery for the individual, often done rather discreetly within the imperial circle. There was then a public ceremony, called a consecratio, including the release of an eagle which flew high, representing the ascent of the deified person's soul to heaven. Imagery featuring the ascent, sometimes using a chariot, was common on coins and in other art.

The largest and most famous example in art is a relief on the base of the Column of Antoninus Pius (d. 161), showing the emperor and his wife Faustina the Elder (d. c. 140) being carried up by a much larger winged figure, described as representing "Eternity", as personifications of "Roma" and the Campus Martius sit below, and eagles fly above. The imperial couple are represented as Jupiter and Juno.

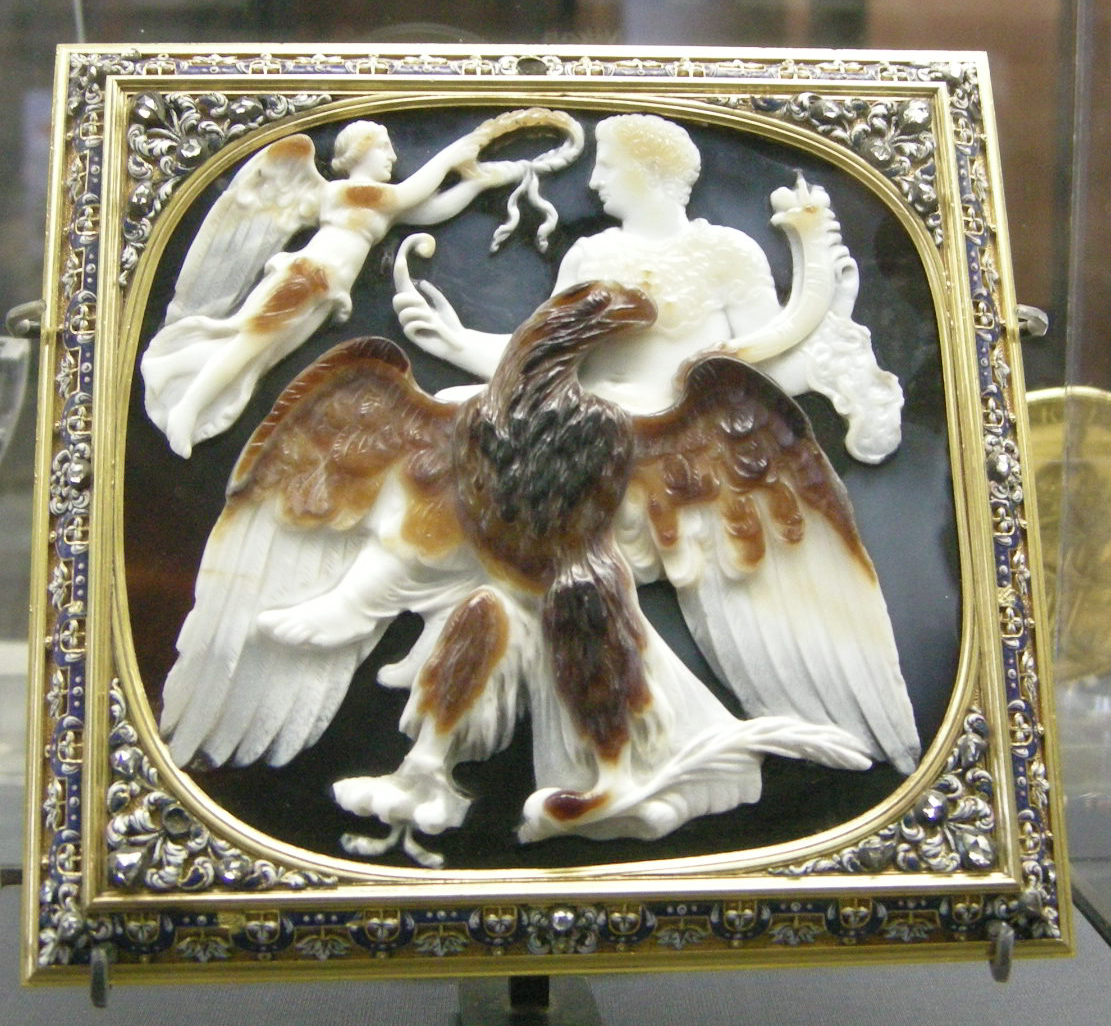
Cameo with the Apotheosis of Claudius, c. 54 AD

The historian Dio Cassius, who says he was present, gives a detailed description of the large and lavish public consecratio of Pertinax, emperor for three months in 193, ordered by Septimius Severus.

At the height of the imperial cult during the Roman Empire, sometimes the emperor's deceased loved ones—heirs, empresses, or lovers, as Hadrian's Antinous—were deified as well. Deified people were awarded posthumously the title Divus (Diva if women) to their names to signify their divinity. Traditional Roman religion distinguished between a deus (god) and a divus (a mortal who became divine or deified), though not consistently. Temples and columns were erected to provide a space for worship.

The imperial cult was mainly popular in the provinces, especially in the Eastern Empire, where many cultures were well-used to deified rulers, and less popular in Rome itself, and among traditionalists and intellectuals. Some privately (and cautiously) ridiculed the apotheosis of inept and feeble emperors, as in the satire The Pumpkinification of (the Divine) Claudius, usually attributed to Seneca.

== Eastern philosophy ==
Numerous mortals have been deified into the Taoist pantheon, such as Guan Yu, Iron-crutch Li and Fan Kuai. Song dynasty general Yue Fei was deified during the Ming dynasty and is considered by some practitioners to be one of the three highest-ranking heavenly generals. The Ming dynasty epic Investiture of the Gods deals heavily with deification legends.

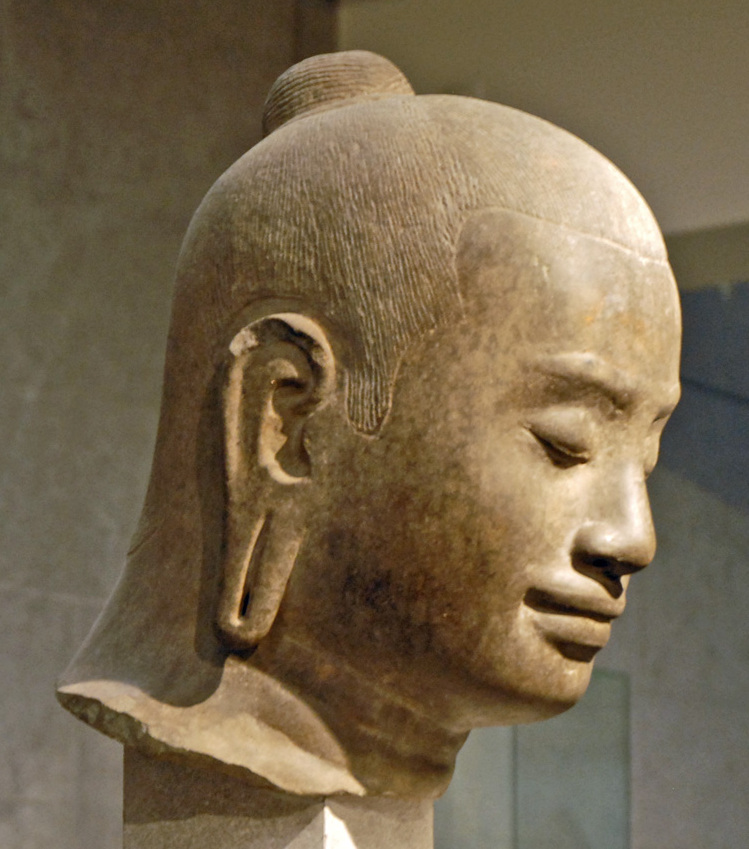
Head of Buddha/King Jayavarman VII; probably regarded as a royal portrait, but with attributes of the Buddha.

In the complicated and variable conceptions of deity in Buddhism, the achievement of Buddhahood may be regarded as an achievable goal for the faithful, and many significant deities are considered to have begun as normal humans, from Gautama Buddha himself downwards. Most of these are seen as avatars or re-births of earlier figures.

Some significant Hindu deities, in particular Rama, were also born as humans; he is seen as an avatar of Vishnu. In more modern times, Swaminarayan is an undoubted and well-documented historical figure (1781–1830), who is regarded by some Hindus as an avatar of Krishna, himself another avatar of Vishnu, or as being a still more elevated deity. Bharat Mata ("Mother India") began as a national personification devised by a group of Bengali intellectuals in the late 19th century, but now receives some worship.

Various Hindu and Buddhist rulers in the past have been represented as deities, especially after death, from India to Indonesia. Jayavarman VII, King of the Khmer Empire (r. 1181–1218) the first Buddhist king of Cambodia, had his own features used for the many statues of Buddha/Avalokitesvara he erected.

The extreme personality cult instituted by the founder of North Korea, Kim Il-Sung, has been said to represent a deification, though the state is avowedly atheist.

== Christianity ==
Instead of the word "apotheosis", Christian theology uses in English the words "deification" or "divinization" or the Greek word "theosis". Pre-Reformation and mainstream theology, in both East and West, views Jesus Christ as the preexisting God who undertook mortal existence, not as a mortal being who attained divinity (a view known as adoptionism). It holds that he has made it possible for human beings to be raised to the level of sharing the divine nature as 2 Peter 1:4 states that he became human to make humans "partakers of the divine nature". In John 10:34, Jesus referenced Psalm 82:6 when he stated "Is it not written in your Law, I have said you are gods?" Other authors stated: "For this is why the Word became man, and the Son of God became the Son of man: so that man, by entering into communion with the Word and thus receiving divine sonship, might become a son of God." "For He was made man that we might be made God." "The only-begotten Son of God, wanting to make us sharers in his divinity, assumed our nature, so that he, made man, might make men gods." Accusations of self deification to some degree may have been placed upon heretical groups such as the Waldensians.

The Westminster Dictionary of Christian Theology, authored by Anglican Priest Alan Richardson, contains the following in an article titled "Deification":

Deification (Greek theosis) is for Orthodoxy the goal of every Christian. Man, according to the Bible, is 'made in the image and likeness of God'. ... It is possible for man to become like God, to become deified, to become god by grace. This doctrine is based on many passages of both OT and NT (e.g. Ps. 82 (81).6; II Peter 1.4), and it is essentially the teaching both of St Paul, though he tends to use the language of filial adoption (cf. Rom. 8.9–17; Gal. 4.5–7), and the Fourth Gospel (cf. 17.21–23). The language of II Peter is taken up by St Irenaeus, in his famous phrase, 'if the Word has been made man, it is so that men may be made gods' (Adv. Haer V, Pref.), and becomes the standard in Greek theology. In the fourth century, St. Athanasius repeats Irenaeus almost word for word, and in the fifth century, St. Cyril of Alexandria says that we shall become sons 'by participation' (Greek methexis). Deification is the central idea in the spirituality of St. Maximus the Confessor, for whom the doctrine is the corollary of the Incarnation: 'Deification, briefly, is the encompassing and fulfillment of all times and ages', ... and St. Symeon the New Theologian at the end of the tenth century writes, 'He who is God by nature converses with those whom he has made gods by grace, as a friend converses with his friends, face to face.'

=== Roman Catholic Church ===
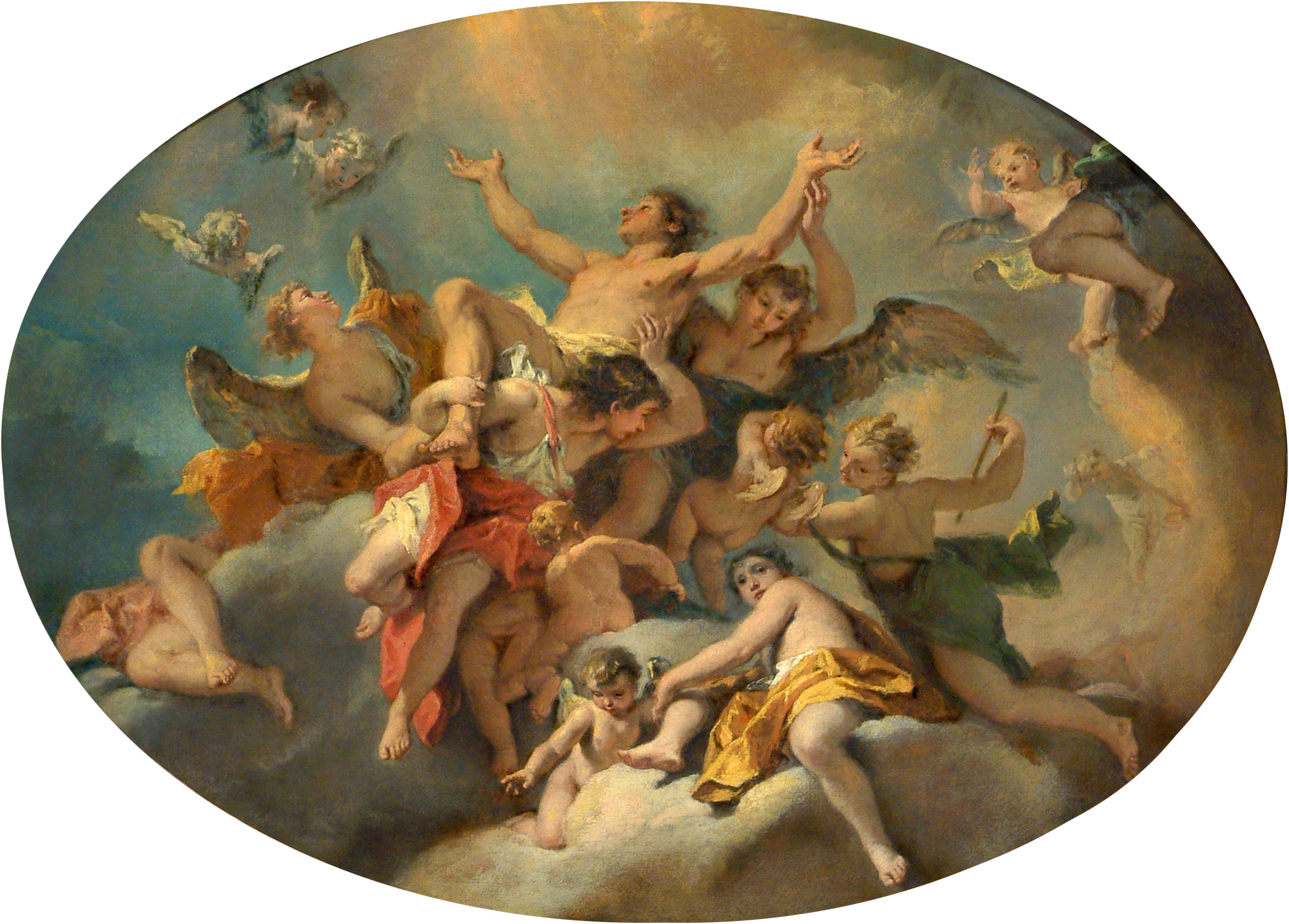
Sebastiano Ricci, Apotheosis of Saint Sebastian, 1725

The Roman Catholic Church does not use the term "apotheosis" in its theology. Corresponding to the Greek word theosis are the Latin-derived words "divinization" and "deification" used in the parts of the Catholic Church that are of Latin tradition. The concept has been given less prominence in Western theology than in that of the Eastern Catholic Churches, but is present in the Latin Church's liturgical prayers, such as that of the deacon or priest when pouring wine and a little water into the chalice: "By the mystery of this water and wine may we come to share in the divinity of Christ who humbled himself to share in our humanity."

Catholic theology stresses the concept of supernatural life, "a new creation and elevation, a rebirth, it is a participation in and partaking of the divine nature" (cf. 2 Peter 1:4). In Catholic teaching there is a vital distinction between natural life and supernatural life, the latter being "the life that God, in an act of love, freely gives to human beings to elevate them above their natural lives" and which they receive through prayer and the sacraments; indeed the Catholic Church sees human existence as having as its whole purpose the acquisition, preservation and intensification of this supernatural life.

Deification for humans is holistic because people have a body and a soul. It begins immaterially or spiritually in the soul via the infusion of sanctifying grace - such as the fruit of the Holy Spirit - in baptism. Spiritual deification is consummated at entry into Paradise. Full deification is achieved at the resurrection on Judgment Day, via material or physical deification, when the body is deified. Only saints will be fully deified, whereas the damned will only be made immortal. The whole Universe is unconditionally predestined for deification on Judgment Day, save for humans and angels, whose predestination to deification is conditioned on moral behavior.

Despite the theological differences, in Catholic church art depictions of the Assumption of the Virgin Mary in art and the Ascension of Jesus in Christian art share many similarities in composition to apotheosis subjects, as do many images of saints being raised to heaven. These last may use "apotheosis" in their modern titles. Early examples were often of the founders of religious orders, later canonized, with those of Saint Ignatius Loyola in the Church of the Gesù (Andrea Pozzo, 1691–1694, to the side of the nave cupola) and Saint Dominic in Santi Domenico e Sisto (1674–1675) two examples in Rome.

The Allegory of Divine Providence and Barberini Power by Pietro da Cortona (1630s) celebrated Pope Urban VIII and his family, combining heraldic symbols including the crossed keys of the papacy and giant bees representing the Barberini family with personifications.

=== Eastern Orthodox Church ===
In Eastern Orthodox theology, Theosis is the transformation of oneself in union with God. The theosis transformation includes a purification of the body and mind (catharsis), an illumination via a vision of God (theoria). In Eastern Christianity, the purpose of human life is theosis. According to Hierotheos (Vlachos), this process is based on direct spiritual insight (gnosis) rather than the rational thought or intellectual and academic pursuits primary in Western Christian traditions.

=== Mormonism ===
Several denominations in Mormonism teach the concept of apotheosis using the term exaltation. The largest denomination of Mormons, the Church of Jesus Christ of Latter-day Saints (LDS Church), teaches that through exaltation, many sufficiently obedient adherents will reach the highest level of salvation in the celestial kingdom and eternally live in God's presence, continue as families, become gods, and have spirit children over whom they will govern. Some more fundamentalist denominations like the Fundamentalist Church of Jesus Christ of Latter-Day Saints (FLDS Church) teach that religious polygamy is required to achieve exaltation. The LDS Church no longer teaches that polygyny is a requirement for exaltation.

=== Wesleyan Protestantism ===
Distinctively, in Wesleyan Protestantism theosis sometimes implies the doctrine of entire sanctification which teaches, in summary, that it is the Christian's goal, in principle possible to achieve, to live without any (voluntary) sin (Christian perfection). Wesleyan theologians detect the influence on Wesley from the Eastern Fathers, who saw the drama of salvation leading to the deification (apotheosis) of the human, in order that such perfection as originally part of human nature in creation but distorted by the fall might bring fellowship with the divine.

== Druze faith ==
The Druze faith further split from Isma'ilism as it developed its own unique doctrines, and finally separated from both Ismāʿīlīsm and Islam altogether; these include the belief that the Imam Al-Ḥākim bi-Amr Allāh was God incarnate. Hamza ibn Ali ibn Ahmad is considered the founder of the Druze faith and the primary author of the Druze manuscripts, he proclaimed that God became flesh, assumed a human nature, and became a man in the form of al-Hakim bi-Amr Allah.

Historian David R. W. Bryer defines the Druzes as ghulat of Isma'ilism, since they exaggerated the cult of the caliph al-Hakim bi-Amr Allah and considered him divine; he also defines the Druzes as a religion that deviated from Islam. He also added that as a result of this deviation, the Druze faith "seems as different from Islam as Islam is from Christianity or Christianity is from Judaism". The Druze deify al-Hākim bi-Amr Allāh, attributing to him divine qualities similar to those Christians attribute to Jesus.

== Music ==
Apart from the visual arts, several works of classical music use the term in the titles or works or sections.

In French Baroque music it was an alternative title to tombeau ("tomb" or "tombstone") for "memorial pieces" for chamber forces to commemorate individuals who were friends or patrons. François Couperin wrote two pieces titled as apotheoses, one for Arcangelo Corelli (Le Parnasse, ou L'Apothéose de Corelli), and one for Jean Baptiste Lully (L'Apothéose de Lully), whose movements have titles such as Enlévement de Lully au Parnasse ("The raising of Lully to Parnassus").

In Romantic music, apotheosis sections usually contain the appearance of a theme in grand or exalted form, typically as a finale. The term is especially associated with the symphonic works of Franz Liszt, where "the main theme, which may by and large be considered as characterizing the hero, is presented in its constituent elements blown up beyond all proportions and, because it is typically slowed down tremendously, is split up into smaller segments". Such a treatment has often been seen by 20th-century critics as "vacuous bombast".

Richard Wagner famously used the term metaphorically in describing Beethoven's Seventh Symphony as "the apotheosis of the dance".

Hector Berlioz used "Apotheose" as the title of the final movement of his Grande symphonie funèbre et triomphale, a work composed in 1846 for the dedication of a monument to France's war dead. Two of Pyotr Ilyich Tchaikovsky's ballets, The Sleeping Beauty and The Nutcracker, contain apotheoses as finales; the same is true of Ludwig Minkus's La Bayadère. Igor Stravinsky composed two ballets, Apollo and Orpheus, which both contain episodes entitled "Apotheose". The concluding tableau of Maurice Ravel's Ma mère l'Oye is also titled "Apotheose." Czech composer Karel Husa, concerned in 1970 about arms proliferation and environmental deterioration, named his musical response Apotheosis for This Earth. Aram Khachaturian entitled a segment of his ballet Spartacus "Sunrise and Apotheosis."

== Poetry ==
Samuel Menashe (1925–2011) wrote a poem entitled Apotheosis, as did Barbara Kingsolver. Emily Dickinson (1830–1886) wrote Love, Poem 18: Apotheosis. The poet Dejan Stojanović's Dancing of Sounds contains the line, "Art is apotheosis." Paul Laurence Dunbar wrote a poem entitled Love's Apotheosis. Samuel Taylor Coleridge wrote a poem entitled "The Apotheosis, or the Snow-Drop" in 1787.

Parodic Apotheoses include the conclusion of Alexander Pope's mock heroic The Rape of the Lock, where the lock of hair that has caused the dispute rises to the heavens:

The Lock, obtain'd with Guilt, and kept with Pain,
In ev'ry place is sought, but sought in vain: ...
But trust the Muse; she saw it upward rise,
Tho' mark'd by none but quick Poetick Eyes:
(So Rome's great Founder to the Heav'ns withdrew,
To Proculus alone confess'd in View.)
A sudden Star, it shot thro' liquid Air,
And drew behind a radiant Trail of Hair.
Not Berenice's Locks first rose so bright,
The Skies bespangling with dishevel'd Light.
The Sylphs behold it kindling as it flies,
And pleas'd pursue its Progress thro' the Skies.

== Anthropolatry ==
Anthropolatry is the deification and worship of humans. It was practiced in ancient Japan towards their emperors. Followers of Socinianism were later accused of practicing anthropolatry. Anthropologist Ludwig Feuerbach professed a religion to worship all human beings while Auguste Comte venerated only individuals who made positive contributions and excluded those who did not.

== See also ==
- Amaterasu
- Cult of personality
- God complex
- Incarnation
- Idolatry
- List of people who have been considered deities
- List of pharaohs deified during lifetime
- List of deified people in Greek mythology
- Religion in ancient Rome
- Sacred king
- Veneration of the dead
- Totenpass
