= Anippe =

Naiad of Greek mythology

In Greek mythology, Anippe (Ancient Greek: Ἀνίππης, romanized: Anippê, lit. 'royal-mare' or 'horse-queen') was the Egyptian daughter of the river-god Nilus. Anippe bore King Busiris of Egypt to Poseidon. This son had the habit of killing strangers under the pretense of hospitality and was ultimately slain by the hero Heracles with his club.

Otherwise, Busiris's mother was called Libya or Lysianassa.
