= Busiris (king of Egypt) =

Mythical king of Egypt

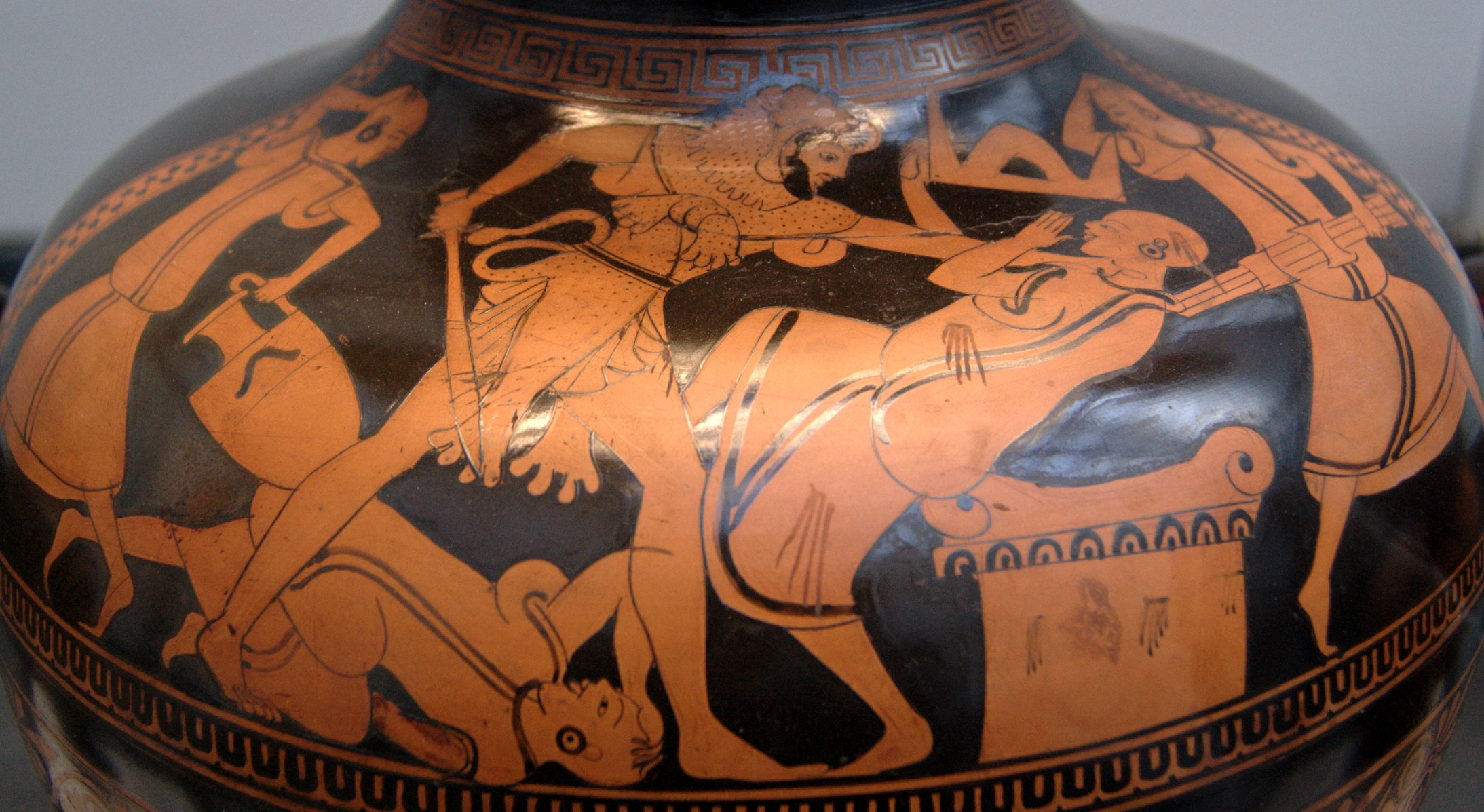
Heracles killing Busiris and his suitors, Attic red-figure hydria, ca. 480 BC, Staatliche Antikensammlungen (Inv. 2428)

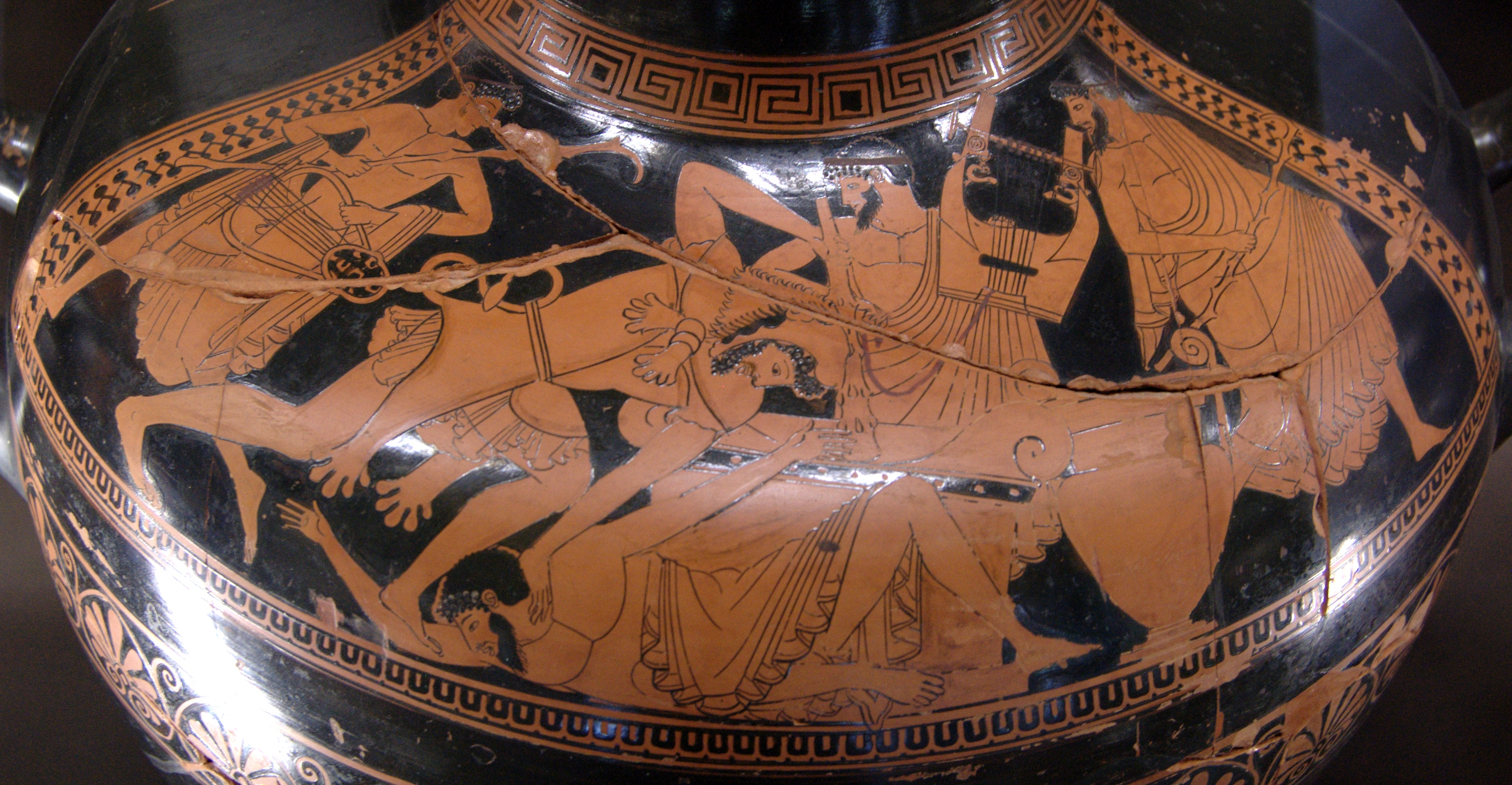
Hercules and Busiris terracota, 490 and circa 480 BC. Louvre Museum collection.

In Greek mythology, Busiris (Ancient Greek: Βούσιρις) was an Egyptian king of the central Delta who was killed by Heracles.

== Biography ==
Isocrates, in his declamation Busiris, recounts "the false tale of Heracles and Busiris" (11.30–11.40), which was a comic subject represented almost entirely in the repertory of early 5th century BC Athenian vase-painters: the theme has a narrow narrative range, according to Niall Livingstone: Heracles being led to sacrifice; his escape; the killing of Busiris; the rout of his entourage.

In Isocrates's rhetorical use of a theme that he considers unworthy of serious treatment, the villainous king of Egypt named Busiris, a son of Poseidon and Libya or Lysianassa, was the ancient founder of Egyptian civilization, with an imagined "model constitution" that Isocrates sets up as a parodic contrast to the Republic by Plato. Otherwise, Busiris's mother was Anippe, daughter of the river-god Nilus. The monstrous Busiris sacrificed all visitors to his gods. Heracles defied Busiris, broke out of his shackles at the last minute, and killed him. Another person who doubted the story of Busiris was Eratosthenes, who said that there was no such king as Busiris, and says that it simply smears Egyptians for being protective of their borders, even though the Carthaginians did the same, and that the whole story was made up to insult the city which bears the name Busiris.

In Diodorus Siculus, Busiris appears as the founder of the line of kings at Thebes, which historically would have been the 11th Dynasty.

According to Hyginus, Busiris was the father of Melite, who became the mother of Metus by her grandfather Poseidon.

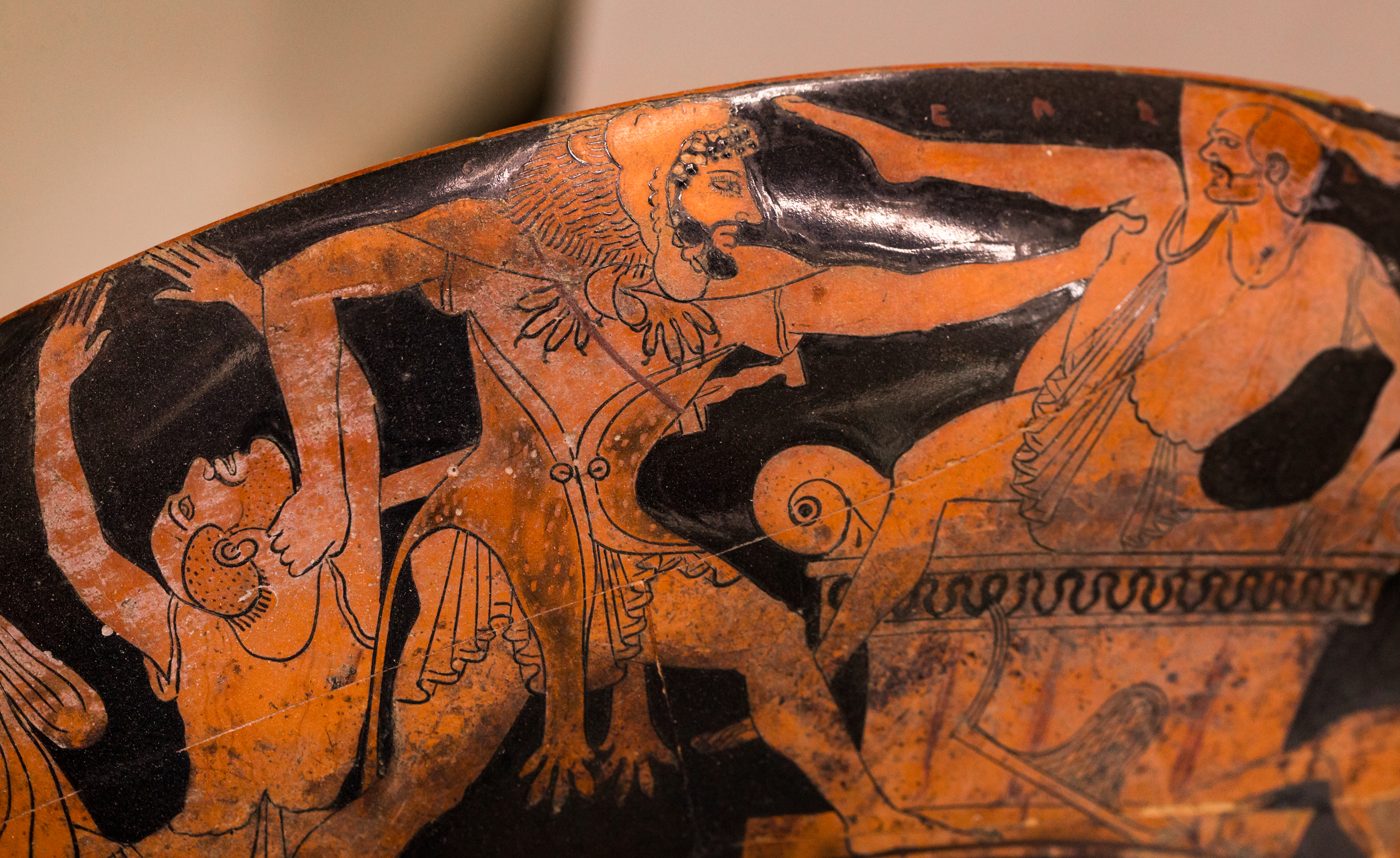
Herakles slaying Busiris on the altar, with other Egyptians, Attic red-figure, ca. 525-500 BC, from the National Etruscan Museum.

This part of the mythology concerning Herakles appears to have origins in a corruption of an Egyptian myth concerning Osiris's sacrifice by Set, and subsequent resurrection (see Legend of Osiris and Isis).

== In literature ==
The mythical king Busiris appears as the leader of a revolt in Lucian's True History (2.23), written in the 2nd century CE.

In Paradise Lost, John Milton uses "Busiris" as the name of the Pharaoh of the Exodus, which suggests a comparison between Heracles's escape and the Israelites' escape from slavery.

In Don Quixote (Part II, Chapter LX) the bandit Roque Guinart refers to himself as "not some cruel Osiris," meaning "Busiris."

== Gallery ==
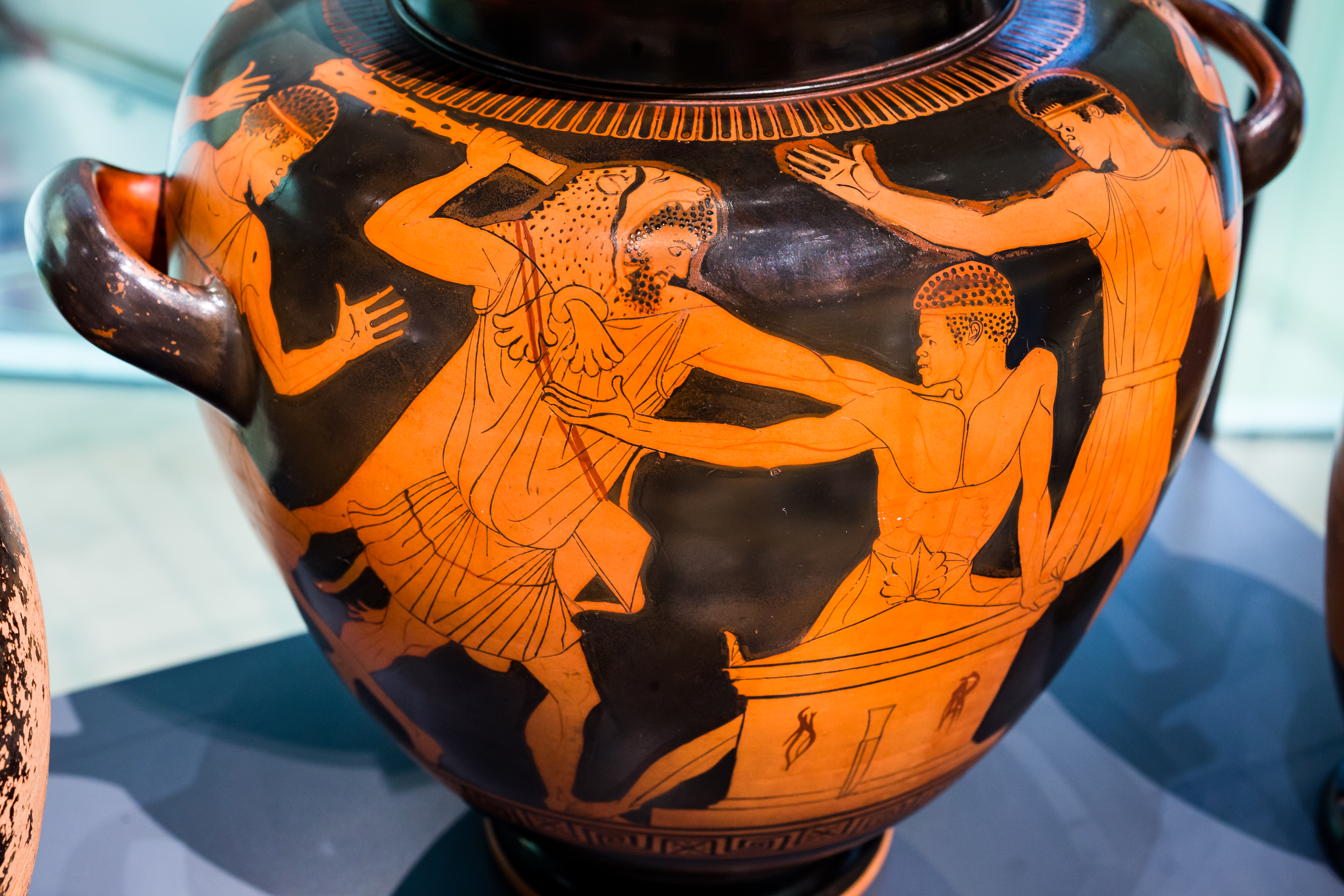
Herakles and Busiris on the altar

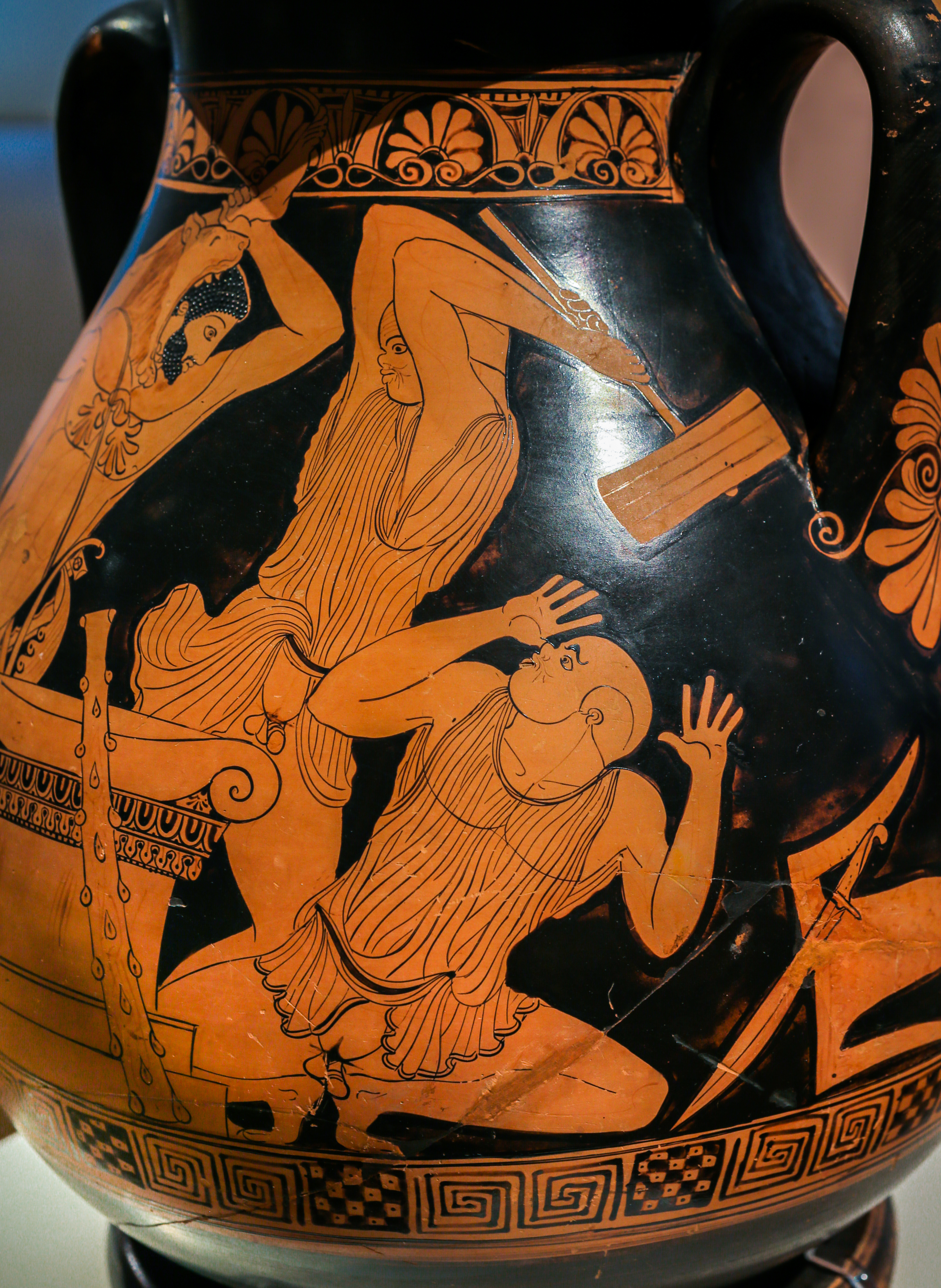
Herakles striking the mythical King Busiris

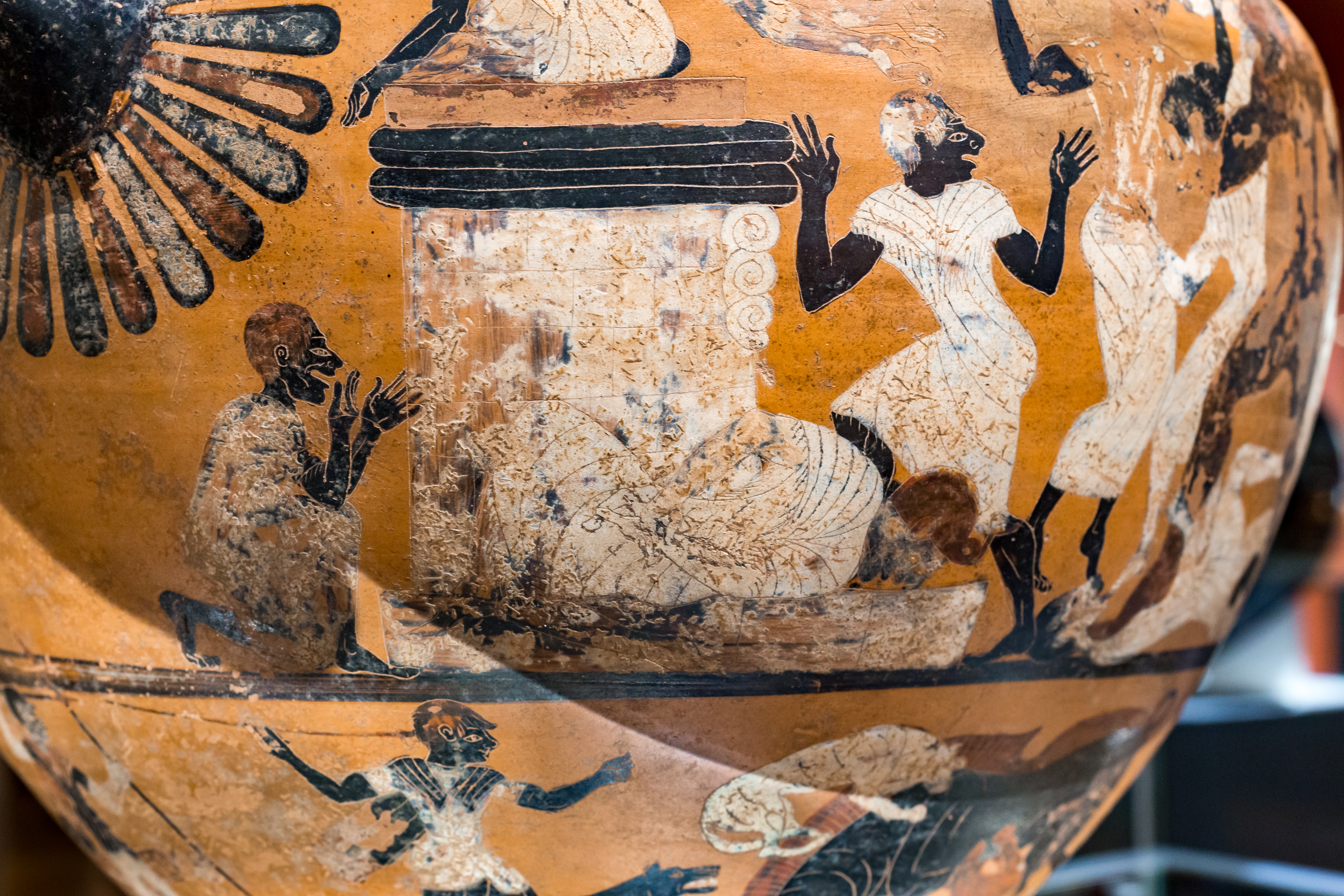
Herakles fighting Busiris and Egyptians

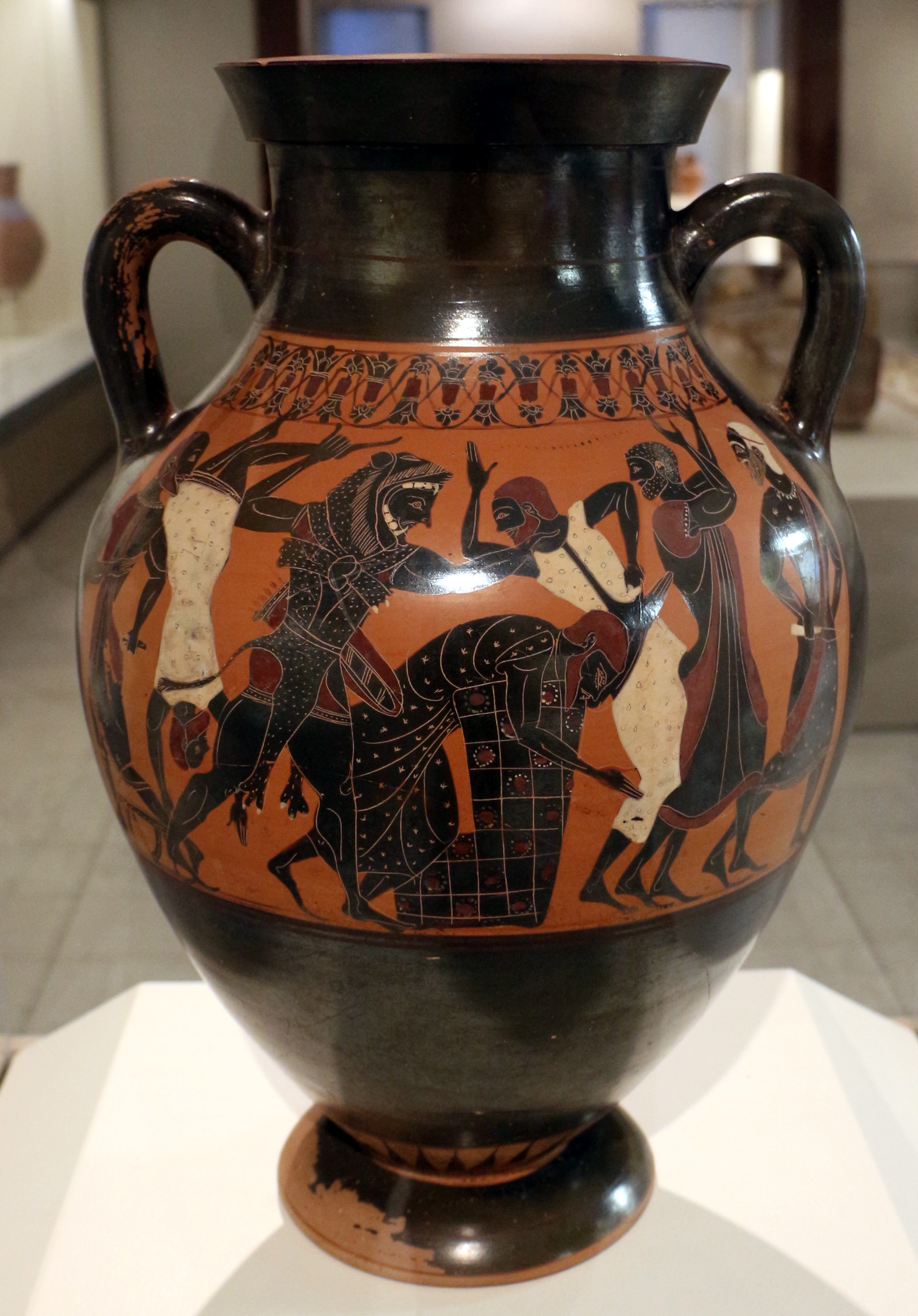
Busiris slain by his Egyptian priests

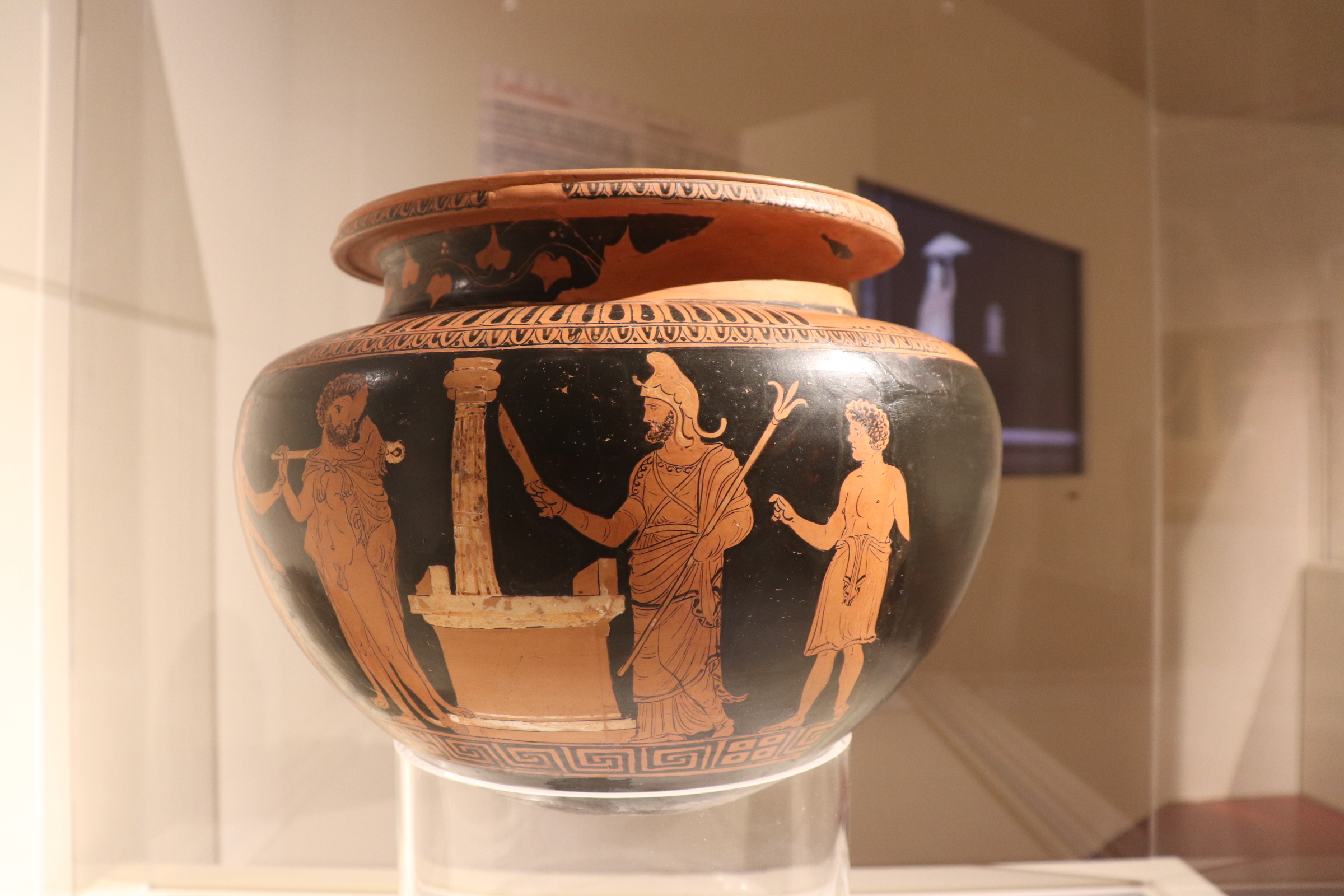
Hercules, Busiris and Dinos at the altar
