= Panopea =

Figures in Greek mythology

In Greek mythology, Panopea (Ancient Greek: Πανόπεια Panopeia) or Panope (Πανόπη) may refer to various characters. The names mean 'panorama' or means 'of the beautiful husband'.

- Panope or Poenope, the Nereid of the sea panorama. She was one of the 50 marine-nymph daughters of the 'Old Man of the Sea' Nereus and the Oceanid Doris. Panope, together with Doto and Galatea, escorted her sister Thetis out of the sea to her wedding with Peleus. Later on, Panope and her other sisters appeared to Thetis when she cries out in sympathy for the grief of Achilles for his slain friend Patroclus.
- Panopea, Panopeia or Panopaea, another 'virgin' Nereid who together with her sisters, Thetis, Nesaea, Spio, Thalia, Cymodoce and Melite, helped the hero Aeneas and his crew during a storm. She may be the same with her above supposed sister who was doubled by Hyginus in his account.
- Panope, a Thespian princess as one of the 50 daughters of King Thespius and Megamede or by one of his many wives. When Heracles hunted and ultimately slew the Cithaeronian lion, Panope with her other sisters, except for one, all lay with the hero in a night, a week or for 50 days as what their father strongly desired it to be. Panope bore Heracles a son, Threpsippas.
