= Nesaea =

Nereid of Greek mythology

In Greek mythology, Nesaea, Nesaia or Nisaea (Ancient Greek: Νησαίη Nêsaiê means 'the dweller on islands') was the "white" Nereid of islands, one of the 50 marine-nymph daughters of the "Old Man of the Sea" Nereus and the Oceanid Doris.

== Mythology ==
Nesaea was one of the Nereids who gathered round Thetis in her sympathetic grief for Achilles' loss of Patroclus.

In some accounts, Nesaea, together with her sisters Thalia, Cymodoce and Spio, was one of the nymphs in the train of Cyrene Later on, these four together with their other sisters Thetis, Melite and Panopea, were able to help the hero Aeneas and his crew during a storm.

== Legacy ==
This name is used to describe a genus of plants in the family Lythraceae.
