= Thalia (Nereid) =

Nereid of Greek mythology

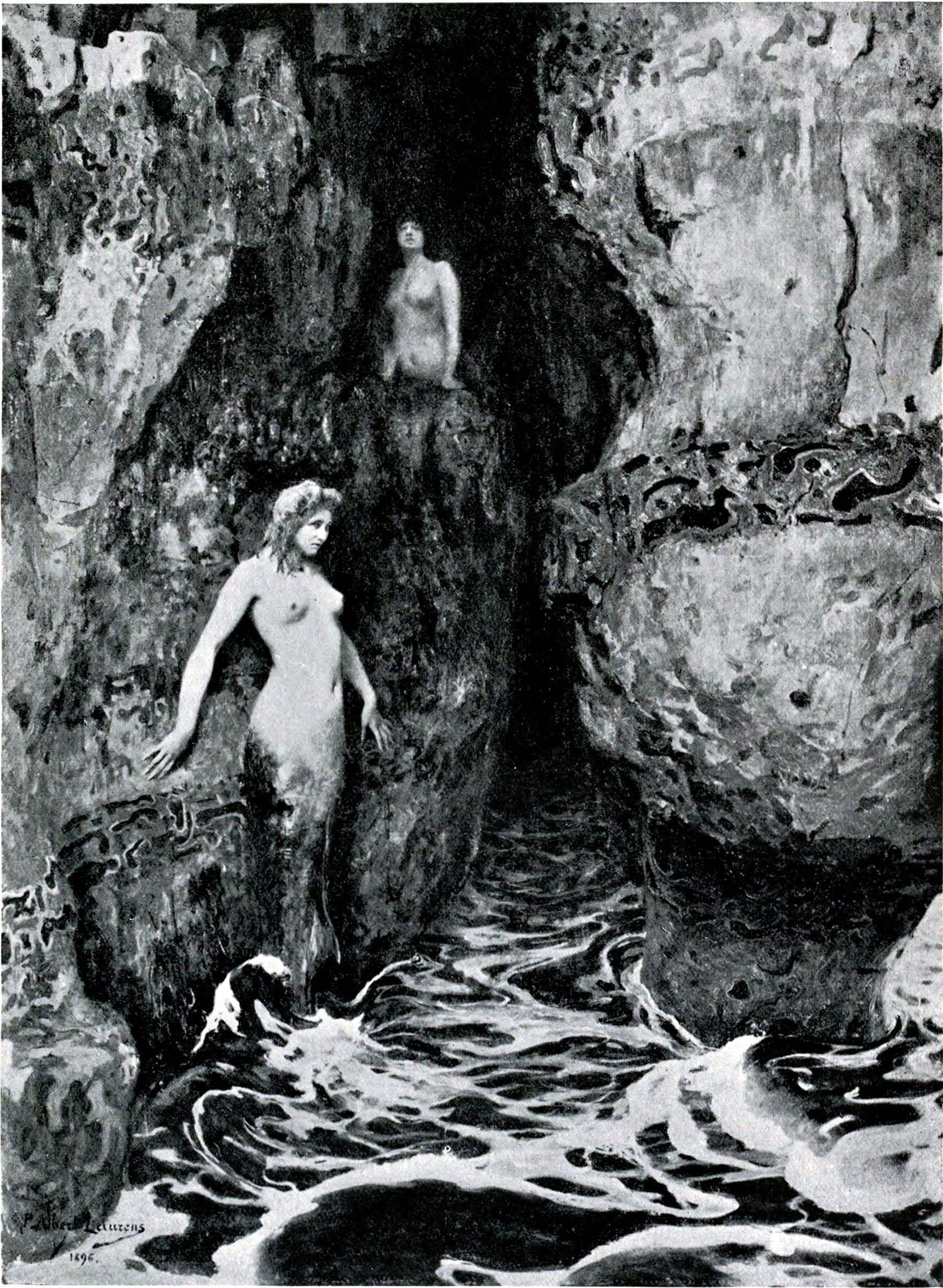
Glauke and Thaleia by Paul Albert Laurens

In Greek mythology, Thalia or Thaleia (/ˈθeɪliə/ or /θəˈlaɪə/; Ancient Greek: Θάλεια Tháleia "the joyous, the abundance") was one of the fifty Nereids, marine-nymph daughters of the 'Old Man of the Sea' Nereus and the Oceanid Doris. Her name was derived from θάλλειν thállein which means "to flourish, to be green".

== Mythology ==
Thaleia was mentioned as one of the 33 Nereids who gather on the coast of Troy from the depths of the sea to mourn with Thetis who cried out in sympathy for the grief of her son Achilles for his slain lover Patroclus in Homer's Iliad.

In some accounts, Thalia, together with her sisters Cymodoce, Nesaea and Spio, was one of the nymphs in the train of Cyrene Later on, these four together with their other sisters Thetis, Melite and Panopea, were able to help the hero Aeneas and his crew during a storm.

== See also ==
- Thalia (Muse)
- Thalia (Grace)
- Thalia (nymph)
