= Cymodoce (mythology) =

In Greek mythology, Cymodoce (Ancient Greek: Κυμοδόκη, romanized: Kymodokê, lit. 'wave-gatherer', 'wave-receiver' or 'awaiting waves') is one of the 50 Nereids, sea-nymph daughters of the 'Old Man of the Sea' Nereus and the Oceanid Doris. She is briefly mentioned in Statius' Silvae.

== Mythology ==
Cymodoce and her other sisters appeared to Thetis when she cried out in sympathy for the grief of Achilles for his slain friend Patroclus. She is also said to be a companion of Aphrodite.

In some accounts, Cymodoce, together with her sisters Thalia, Nesaea and Spio, is one of the nymphs in the train of Cyrene Later on, these four together with their other sisters Thetis, Melite and Panopea, were able to help the hero Aeneas and his crew during a storm.

== Other Cymodoce ==
According to Virgil, when Aeneas landed in Italy, a local warlord named Turnus set his pine-framed ships ablaze. Upon seeing that, the goddess Cybele, remembering that those hulls had been crafted from trees felled on her holy mountains, transformed the vessels into sea nymphs. One of those newly created nymphs was named Cymodoce, like the Nereid.
