= Carme (mythology) =

Mother of Britomartis in Greek mythology

In Greek mythology, Carme (/ˈkɑːrmi/; Ancient Greek: Κάρμη, romanized: Karmē, lit. 'she who cuts the grain', 'shearer' or 'crop') was the mother of the Cretan goddess Britomartis by Zeus.

== Family ==
Carme was either the daughter of Euboulus, the son of the Cretan priest Carmanor and a god revered in mystery religions, or the daughter of Phoenix (son of Agenor) and Cassiopeia. She therefore may have been either of Cretan or Phoenician origin.

== Mythology ==
Like other members of her family, Carme may have been an agricultural or harvest demigoddess. In various myths her potential father Euboulus was associated with Demeter, Persephone, grain, and swine. Some tellings additionally refer to him as the son of Demeter. Chrysothemis, sister of Euboulus, may have been a harvest demigoddess as well.
