= Metus (mythology) =

Son of Neptune in the Fabulae

In H. J. Rose's 1934 edition of the Fabulae (2nd century AD), Metus is the son of the sea god Neptune and Melite, daughter of the Egyptian king Busiris. In Peter K. Marshall's 2002 edition of the work, this figure is given as Amykos and his mother's name as Melie. The former reading comes from the F manuscript of the Fabulae, and the latter from Daniel Heinsius's edition.
