= Regina Vasorum =

Ancient Greek vase

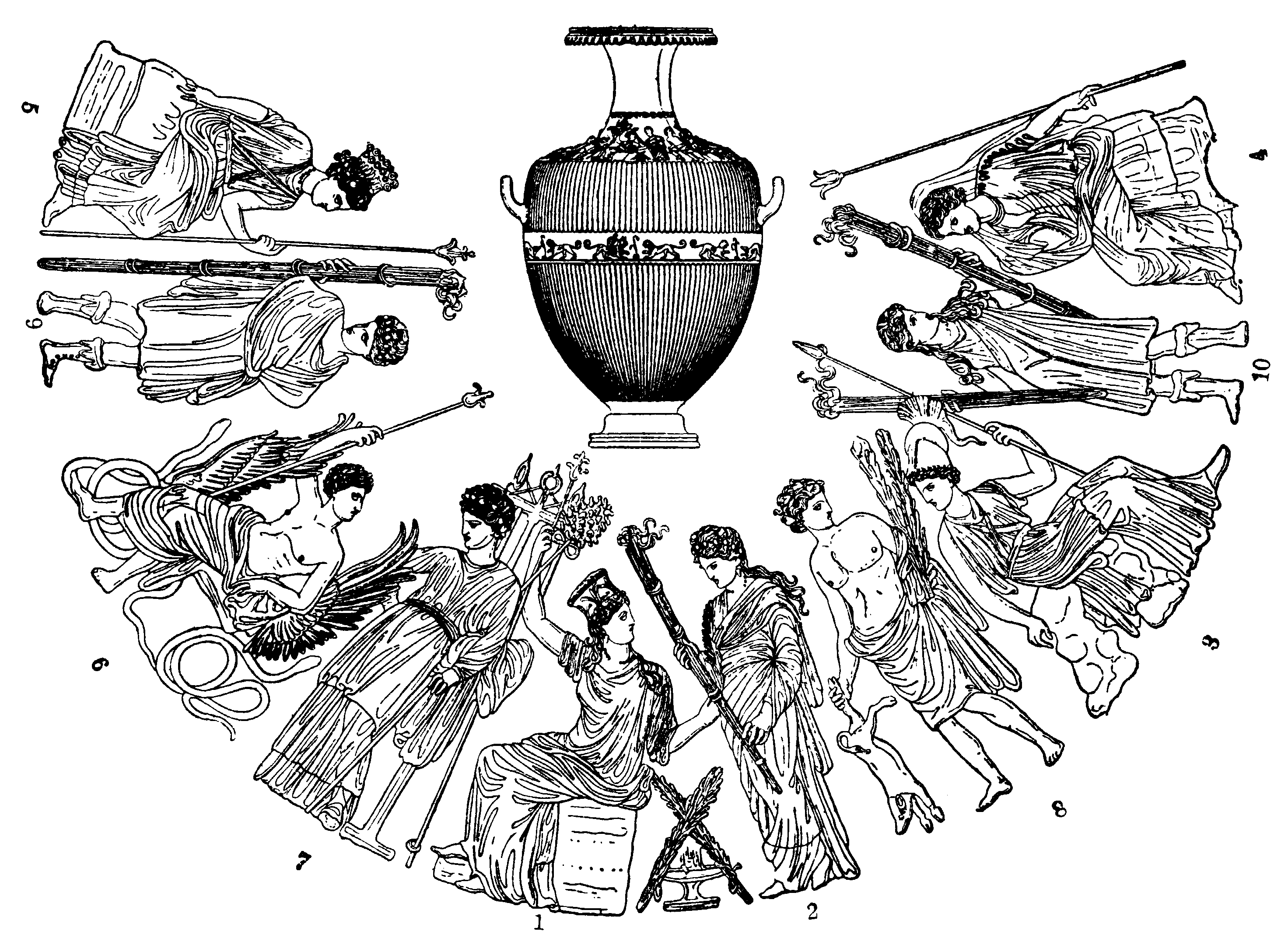
Drawing of Eleusinian figures around the neck of the Queen of Vases

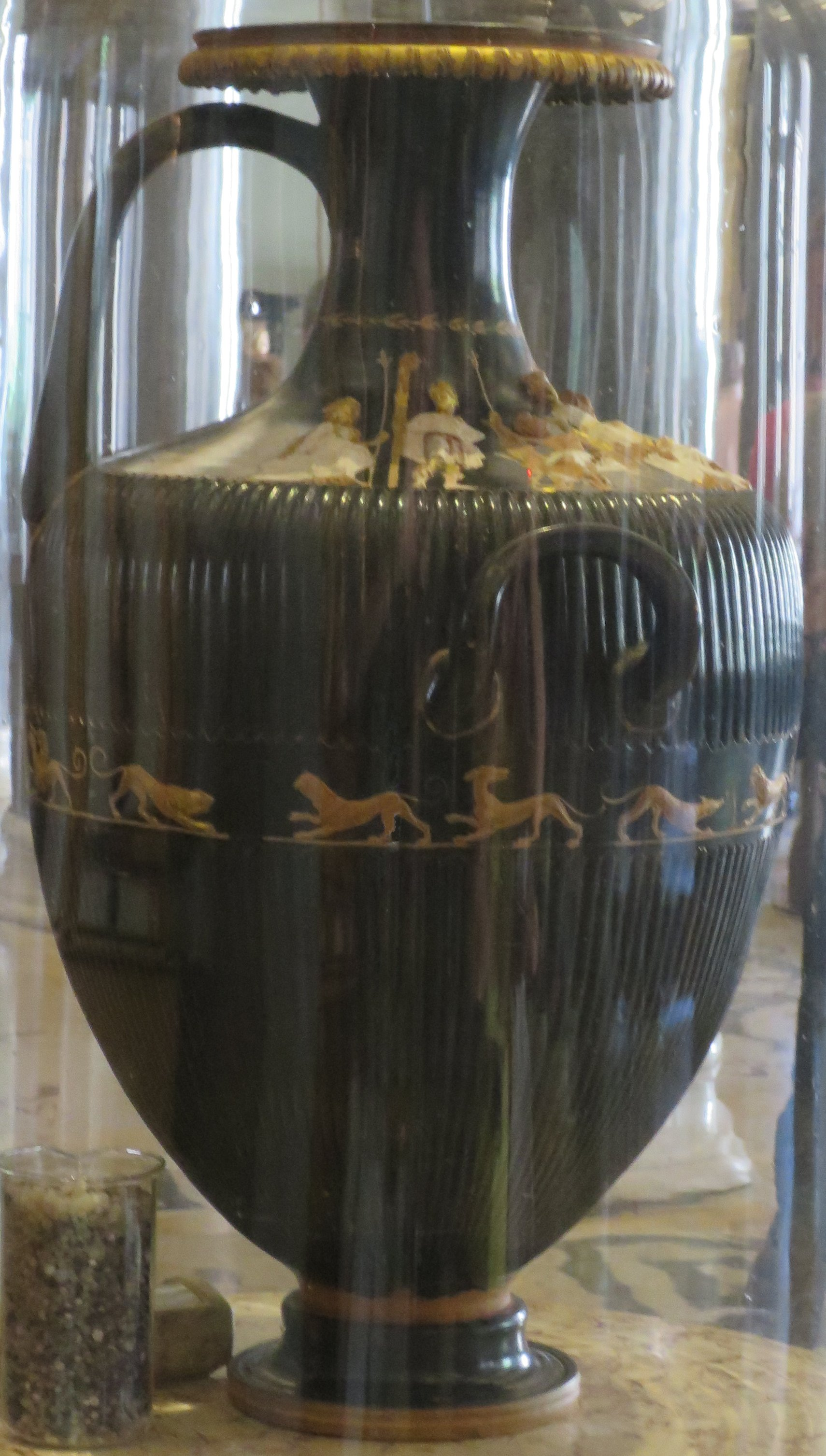
Photo of the Regina Vasorum; the hydria stands 65.5 cm high

The Regina Vasorum or Queen of Vases is a 4th-century BC hydria from Cumae depicting Eleusinian divinities with gilded flesh in polychrome relief. It is held in the collections of the Hermitage Museum, St. Petersburg. In addition to its aesthetic qualities, it is valued as an iconographical source for ancient Greek religion.

The Regina Vasorum is a "spectacular" and unusually large example of technical experimentation among Greek potters after the red-figure style had run its course. The figures were made separately, painted, and gilded, then attached to the vase with slip, possibly by sprigging.

== See also ==
- South Italian ancient Greek pottery B2AC911

== Sources ==
- Elena Ananitch, Lucanian Vases («L'Erma» di Bretschneider, 2005), p. 7 online.
- Kevin Clinton, Greek Sanctuaries, p. 92 online.
- Beth Cohen, The Colors of Clay: Special Techniques in Athenian Vases (J. Paul Getty Museum, 2006), p. 115.
- Erika Simon, Festivals of Attica: An Archaeological Commentary (University of Wisconsin Press, 1983), passim.
