= HMS Britomart =

Seven ships of the Royal Navy have borne the name HMS Britomart, after the Britomartis of Greek mythology:

- HMS Britomart was a 16-gun brig-sloop captured from the Danes in 1807 and commissioned as HMS Glommen. She was renamed HMS Britomart in 1808, but the name change was rescinded before she wrecked in 1809.
- HMS Britomart (1808) was a 10-gun Cherokee-class brig-sloop launched in 1808. She participated in the capture of several small privateers and merchant vessels. She was also at the bombardment of Algiers (1816). The Navy sold Britomart in 1819. She then entered mercantile service. She sailed to South America, Van Diemen's Land (now Tasmania), and the Indian Ocean. She spent much of her time sailing between England, Van Diemen's Land and the Australian mainland. She foundered in 1839 on her way between Port Phillip and Hobart.
- HMS Britomart (1820) was another 10-gun Cherokee-class brig-sloop, launched in 1820 and sold in 1843. Captain William Hobson, of Britomart, asserted British sovereignty over New Zealand in 1840
- HMS Britomart (1847) was an 8-gun brig launched in 1847. She was used as a coastguard vessel from 1857 and was renamed WV25 in 1863. She was broken up by 1874.
- HMS Britomart (1860) was a wood screw Britomart-class gunboat launched in 1860. She was sold in 1892, and then resold as a mooring hulk, being broken up in 1946.
- HMS Britomart (1899) was a Bramble-class gunboat launched in 1899 and sold in 1920 into civilian service, being renamed Sakuntala.
- HMS Britomart (J22) was a Halcyon-class minesweeper launched in 1938 and sunk in 1944.
