= Scephrus =

In Greek mythology, Scephrus (Ancient Greek: Σκέφρος) was the son Tegeates and Maera, and the brother of Leimon. When Apollo and Artemis visited the land of Tegea, Scephrus came to the god and had a private conversation with him; Leimon, thinking that they were plotting against him, reacted by murdering his brother. To punish the death of Scephrus, Artemis shot Leimon dead afterwards. Following this, at the Tegean festival of Apollo Agyieus, one part of the proceedings honoured Scephrus.
