= Britomartis =

Cretan goddess of mountains and hunting

- Goddess of mountains, fishing nets, and hunting
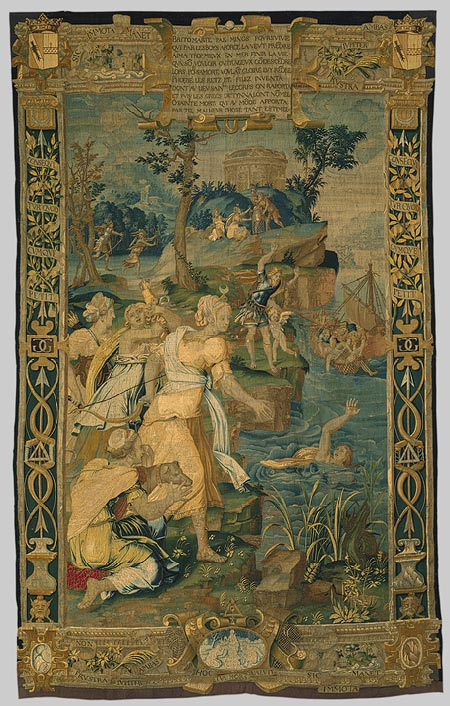
- The Drowning of Britomartis tapestry, probably designed by Jean Cousin the Elder
- Other names: Dictynna, Dictymna, Dicte
- Major cult centre: Crete
- Symbols: Mountains, fishing nets, the moon
- Temple: Diktynnaion
- Festivals: Britomarpeia

Genealogy
- Parents: Zeus (father); Carme (mother)

Equivalents
- Aeginian: Aphaea

Britomartis (/brɪtoʊˈmɑːrtɪs/; Ancient Greek: Βριτόμαρτις) was a Greek goddess of mountains, nets, and hunting who was primarily worshipped on the island of Crete. She was sometimes described as a nymph, but she was more commonly conflated or syncretized with the goddesses Artemis, Athena, and Aphaea. She was also known as Dictynna, Dicte, Dictymna, or as a daughter of Dictynna (Δίκτυννα).

In the 16th century, Edmund Spenser named a character identified with English military prowess as "Britomart" in his knightly epic The Faerie Queene. This subsequently led to a number of appearances of "Britomart" figures in British art and literature.

== Etymology ==
According to Solinus, the name 'Britomartis' is from a Cretan dialect. He also says that her name means virgo dulcis, or "sweet virgin". It is possible that her name also means "sweet" or "blessing" (βριτύς) "maiden," with Hesychius of Alexandria equating the Cretan βριτύ (britý) with the Greek word γλυκύ (glyký) 'sweet'. Other scholars have argued that Britomartis is an epithet that does not reveal the goddess's name or character, instead arguing that it may be a noa-name.

== Mythology ==
The goddess was frequently portrayed on Cretan coinage, either as herself or as Diktynna, the goddess of Mount Dikte, Zeus' birthplace. As Diktynna, she was depicted as a winged goddess with a human face, standing atop the mountain and grasping an animal in each hand. This imagery is directly related to the Potnia Theron motif, also known as the mistress of animals. She also occasionally appeared on coinage with a crescent moon, likely due to her close relationship with Artemis, goddess of the moon.

By the Hellenistic period Britomartis had been given a genealogical setting that cast her into a classical context:

Britomartis, who is also called Dictynna, the myths relate, was born at Caeno in Crete of Zeus and Carmê, the daughter of Eubulus who was the son of Demeter; she invented the nets (dictya) which are used in hunting.

One of the primary myths involving Britomartis concerns her being pursued by King Minos. According to Diodorus, Britomartis was a nymph and huntress much beloved by Artemis. Minos took interest in her and pursued her for nine months. She continually fled his advances, and to escape, she at last leapt into the sea (possibly from Mount Dikte) and landed in fishermen's nets. She became entangled but was rescued by Artemis, who then made her a goddess. In his third hymn to Artemis, Callimachus tells a similar tale, and claims it is the source of the name and title Diktynna, "Lady of the Nets." Some tellings instead claim that she was taken by fishermen to Greece, therefore explaining the spread of her cult on mainland Greece. Diodorus Siculus found it less than credible:

But those men who tell the tale that she has been named Dictynna because she fled into some fishermen's nets when she was pursued by Minos, who would have ravished her, have missed the truth; for it is not a probable story that the goddess should ever have got into so helpless a state that she would have required the aid that men can give, being as she is the daughter of the greatest one of the gods.

Another version of the myth claims Britomartis vowed to live in perpetual maidenhood, and that she was a frequent wanderer before eventually settling in Crete. It claims she was born in Phoenicia, travelled to Argos and visited the daughters of the river god Erasinos, went to Cephalonia and was worshiped under the name Laphria, and then finally arrived in Crete and was pursued by Minos. This version of the myth additionally has her flee onto the island of Aegina, where she was then built a temple and worshipped as a goddess.

Strabo notes she was venerated as Diktynna primarily in western Crete, in the regions of Cydonia and Lysos, where there was a Diktynnaion, or temple of Diktynna. Occasionally she was conflated with Artemis or Athena as the same goddess, with Solinus explicitly identifying her as the Cretan Artemis. Diodorus suggests that since "she passed her time in the company of Artemis," that this was the "reason why some men think Diktynna and Artemis are one and the same goddess." She was also been associated with Hecate.

== As Diktynna ==
320-280 BC silver stater coin with the head of Artemis Dictynna from Cydonia, Crete, now kept in the Archaeological Museum of Chania.

A xoanon of Britomartis, allegedly carved by Daedalus, sat in the temple of Olous. In Chersonesos and Olous, she was often portrayed on coins and celebrated during the festival Britomarpeia, showing that she was worshipped in those cities. As Diktynna, her face was pictured on Cretan coins of Kydonia, Polyrrhenia and Phalasarna as the nurse of Zeus. Some early Britomartis coins produced in Kydonia were manufactured as overstrikes of specimens manufactured in Aegina.

Temples dedicated to her existed in Athens, Sparta, Massalia and between Ambrosus and Anticyra in Phocis, where, as Artemis Diktynna, her cult object was a black stone worked by Aeginetans. One temple dedicated to the goddess was located on Mount Tityros near Cydonia. Her temples were said to be guarded by vicious dogs stronger than bears.

Another name, Pipituna, found in Linear B scripts, may be another form of Diktynna.

== As Aphaea ==
In the second century CE, the Greek writer Pausanias described Britomartis saying, "She was made a goddess by Artemis, and she is worshipped, not only by the Cretans, but also by the Aiginetans." The myths surrounding the Aeginian version of Britomartis differ slightly. Antoninus Liberalis wrote that, after escaping Minos, she arrived at Aegina, but a local fisherman named Andromedes attempted to assault her, so she jumped off the boat and fled onto the island. There, she became known as Aphaea, the "invisible" patroness of the island. Antoninus interprets the name Aphaea as 'she who disappeared'. Aphaea was primarily worshiped at the temple of "Athena Aphaea," where she had a statue. A temple dedicated to her also existed at Aspropyrgos on the outskirts of Athens.

Like Britomartis and Artemis, Aphaea was associated with the moon.

== Spenser's "Britomart" ==
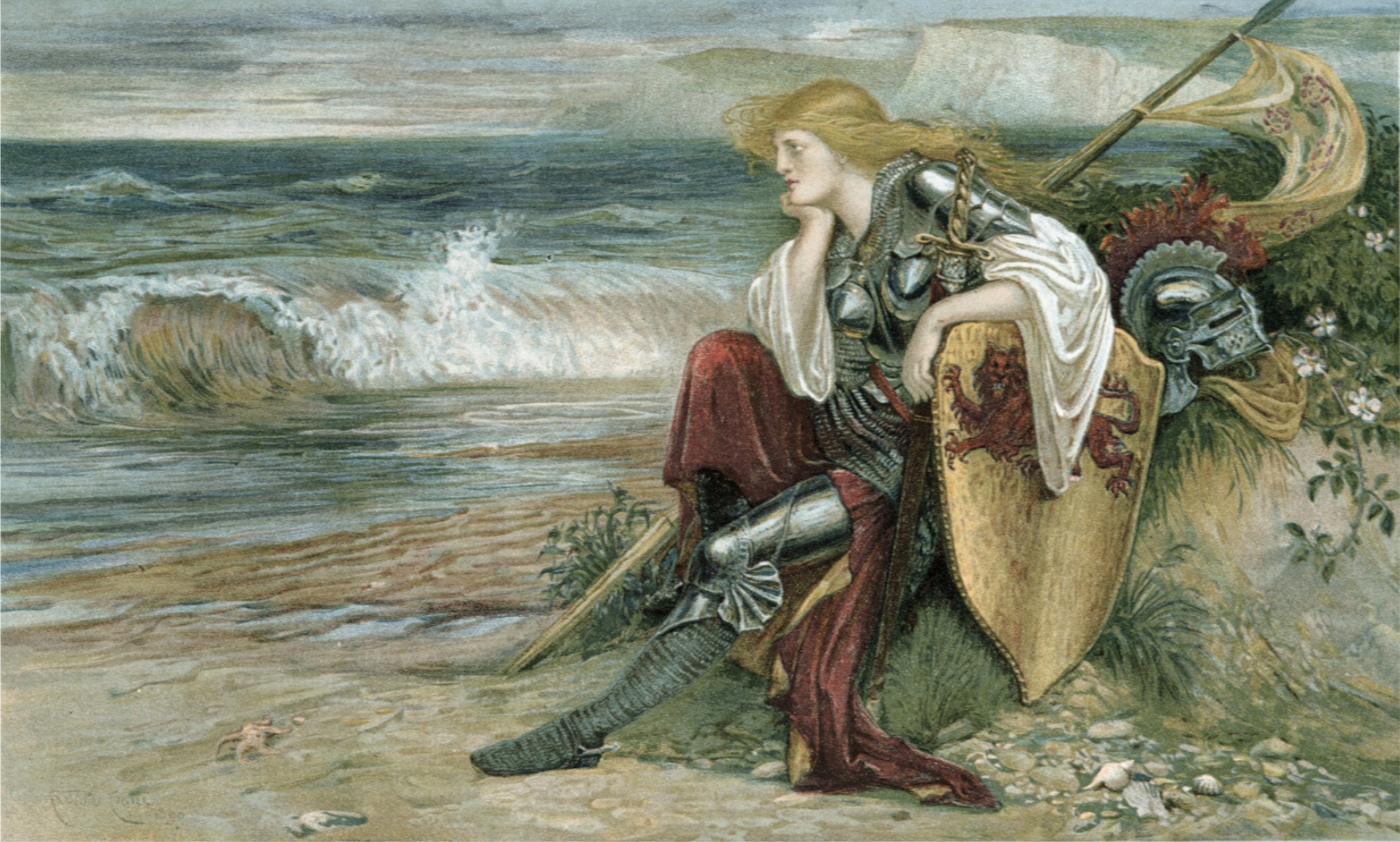
Walter Crane - Britomart (1900)

Britomart figures in Edmund Spenser's knightly epic The Faerie Queene, where she is an allegorical figure of the virgin Knight of Chastity, representing English virtue—in particular, English military power—through a folk etymology that associated Brit-, as in Briton, with Martis, here thought of as "of Mars", the Roman war god.

== See also ==
- HMS Britomart, any of several Royal Navy ships of that name
- Point Britomart, location in Auckland, New Zealand, former namesake of Britomart Station
