= Domuztepe (Aslantaş) =

Coordinates: 37.291389°N 36.256944°E

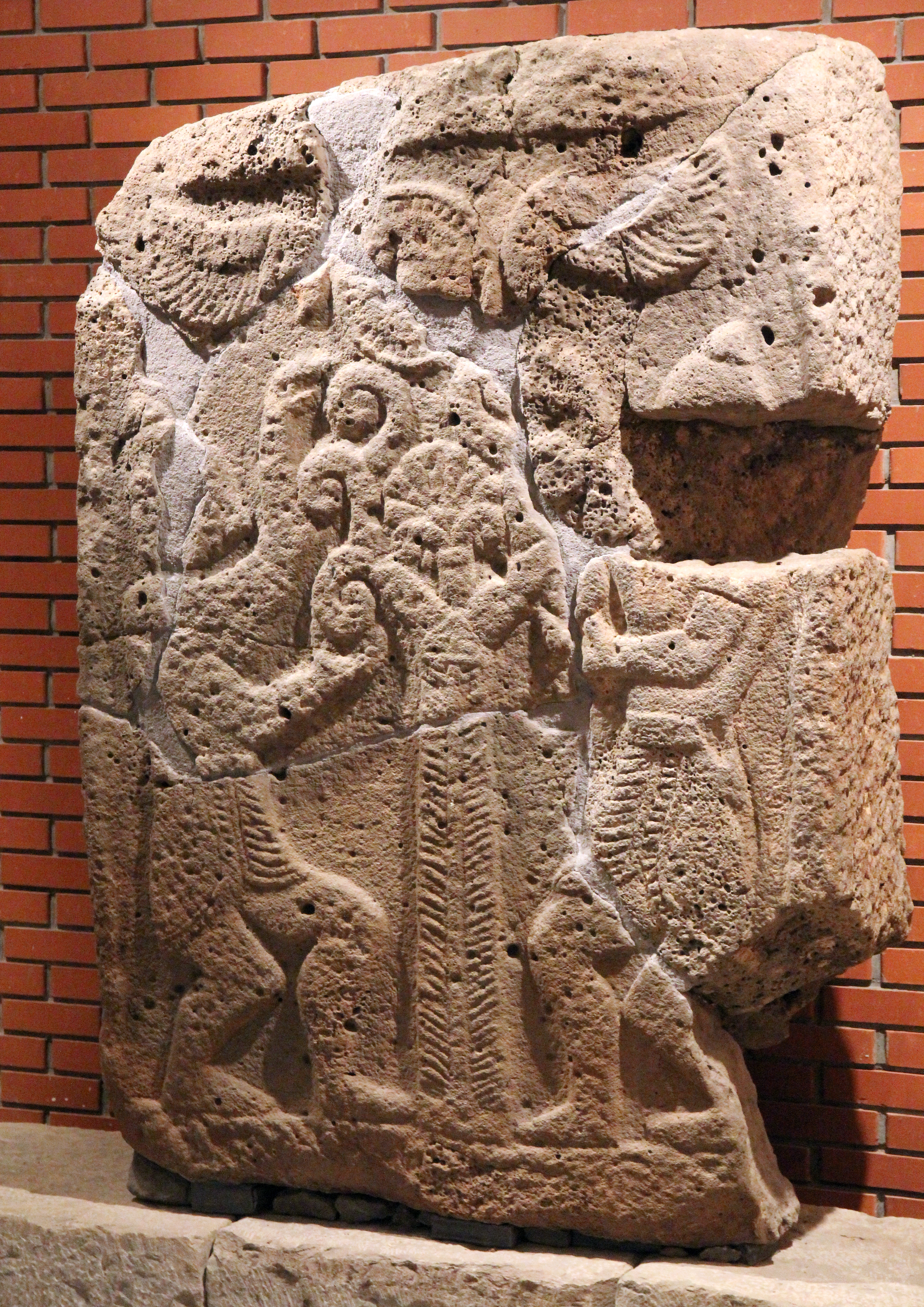
Domuztepe orthostat - Tree of Life; 8th century BC. Karatepe-Aslantaş Open-Air Museum

Domuztepe (Aslantaş) is an archaeological site in Osmaniye Province in southern Turkey. It is located on the eastern bank of the Ceyhan River within the Karatepe-Aslantaş National Park. Across the river, there is the important Hittite site of Karatepe that was inhabited at the same time, starting in the ninth century BC.

This site is different from Domuztepe (Domuztepe Höyüğü (Kahramanmaraş)), the large mound of the Halaf period (fifth millennium BC) that is situated near Kahramanmaraş. Kahramanmaras is also located on the Ceyhan river; it is about 70km upstream from Karatepe and Domuztepe.

After the construction of Aslantaş Dam, Domuztepe (Aslantaş) was substantially flooded.

Unlike Karatepe, which was founded in the Iron Age period, Domuztepe (Aslantaş) has a long sequence of occupation beginning with the Neolithic period (8th Millennium BC). Domuztepe is located on a natural hill. It was partly excavated in the early 1980s, before the lower parts of the site became mostly submerged by the dam lake.

A fortified city of the Hittite empire period also flourished there. At that time, there was a river crossing here on the caravan route between Syria and Anatolia.

== Excavations ==
In 1947, Th. Bossert and B. Alkım reported finding a statue base with two bulls at the site. It carries a poorly preserved hieroglyphic Luwian inscription. The find is currently at the Karatepe Museum.

In 1982, a Storm God stele was discovered at the site by Halet Çambel. Also several portal lions were found.

Some villas of Roman period have also been discovered. In 1958, this currently forested area was designated as a Historic National Park.

An 8th century BC "Tree of Life" orthostat was found here (illustration above). Two figures, probably gods, dance around a tree of life, under a winged sun disc. It is the only sample from Domuztepe which can be called an orthostat. From the viewpoint of design and workmanship the relief must have been carved by a sculptor from a workshop of Karatepe–Aslantaş.

== See also ==
- Syro-Hittite states

== Bibliography ==
- Çambel, H. Corpus of Hieroglyphic Luwian Inscriptions, Vol. 2: Karatepe-Aslantaş, Berlin. 1999: 1–11, 94–95 and plts. 122–25

== External sites ==
- Domuztepe on the Ceyhan at vici.org
- Karatepe-Aslantaş (2017) turkisharchaeonews.net
