= Bahadır Alkım =

Turkish archaeologist

Bahadır Alkım Bayraktar
- Born: February 28, 1915; İzmir, Ottoman Empire
- Died: May 6, 1981 (aged 66); Istanbul, Turkey
- Education: Istanbul University
- Occupation: Archaeology

Bahadır Alkım Bayraktar (February 28, 1915 – May 6, 1981) was a Turkish archaeologist.

Bahadır Alkım Bayraktar was born in İzmir, then Ottoman Empire on February 28, 1915. After his high school education, he entered the Faculty of Letters at Istanbul University in 1935 studying Assyriology, Hittitology, Archaeology and Ancient history. He graduated in 1939, and in 1941 he became a scientific assistant at the same faculty. Alkın obtained a PhD degree in 1944. In 1945, he became a lecturer, and in 1960, he was appointed professor serving at this post until his death. Between 1962 and 1975, he lectured at Robert College, where he acted as the Turkish director in the 1963–64 term. He founded the Institute of Archaeometry at the same institution, which is now the Boğaziçi University. He served at several European universities as visiting scholar.

Alkım took part at archaeological excavations in Vize (1942), Alaca Höyük (1942), and with Leonard Woolley in Alalakh (1947). In 1947, he was elected member of the Turkish Historical Society (Turkish: Türk Tarih kurumu), which sponsored all his later archaeological excavations.

He participated at Karatepe excavation in southern Turkey with Helmuth Theodor Bossert (1889–1961) and Halet Çambel (1916–2014) in 1947. The discovery of Karatepe Bilingual decisively led to the decryption of Hieroglyphic Luwian with the help of Phoenician alphabet.

In 1949, he carried out research work at Domuztepe across Karatepe. His expeditions between 1947 and 1957 in the area of Anti-Taurus Mountains and Amanos Mountains led him the discovery of an ancient trail network. From 1957 until 1961, Alkım excavated at the Yesemek Quarry and Sculpture Workshop in Gaziantep Province, which was discovered by Felix von Luschan (1854–1924). He took part also at the excavation in Amik Valley, Cilicia.

His excavation between 1958 and 1972 at Tilmen Höyük unearthed four overlaid settlements dating back from the Late Chalcolithic period to the Islamic epoch, including a 19th-century BC old city and a palace building of the Yamhad Kingdom. He began in 1964 to work at Gedikli Karahöyük excavation, which lasted until 1967. There, a necropolis was revealed featuring unusual burial forms of ancient Asia Minor.

Alkım localized more than fifty settlements at his surface surveys he carried out in the Black Sea Region in the years from 1971 to 1973. His last excavation was at İkiztepe near Bafra, Samsun Province, he began in 1974, and lasted until his death. At İkiztepe, finds and artifacts dating back to the Early Bronze Age and the Early Hittite Period were retrieved.

Bahadır Alkım died at age 66 in Istanbul on May 6, 1981. He was married to Handan Alkım, who worked with him at several excavations.

== Selected bibliography ==
- Karatepe kazisi / Excavations at Karatepe. Ankara, Türk Tarih Kurumu Basımevi 1948.
- Anatolia I: From the Beginning to 1000 B. C. Cleveland / New York, Hippocrene Books 1968, ISBN 978-0-88254-146-4.
