= List of Ankara University rectors =

Below is the list of rectors of the Ankara University in Turkey. The first rector was Şevket Aziz Kansu. The incumbent rector is Erkan İbiş.

Rector (president)	Duration
Şevket Aziz Kansu	22.06.1946–26.04.1948
Enver Ziya Karal	30.04.1948–22.06.1949
Hikmet Birand	22.06.1949–22.06.1951
Ekrem İzmen	22.06.1951–22.06.1953
Cahit Oğuzoğlu	22.06.1953–22.06.1955
İzzet Birant	22.06.1955-22.06.1957
Zihni Erençin	22.06.1957–22.06.1959
Suut Kemal Yetkin	22.06.1959–4.11.1963
İhsan Doğramacı	4.11.1963–4.11-1965
Cumhur Ferman	4.11.1965–10.06.1969
Tahsin Özgüç	1.08.1969–31.05.1980
Türkan Akyol	31.05.1980–31.07.1982
Tarık Galip Somer	31.07.1982–1.08.1987
Necdet Serin	1.08.1987–20.08.1992
Günal Akbay	20.08.1992–7.08.2000
Nusret Aras	7.08.2000–6.08.2008
Cemal Taluğ	6.08.2008–6.08.2012
Erkan İbiş	6.08.2008–28.07.2016
