= Yusuf Akçura =

Turkish politician, writer and ideologist of ethnic Tatar origin (1876–1935)

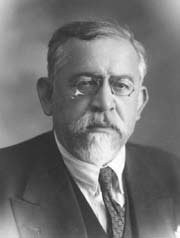

President of Turkish Historical Society
- In office 8 April 1932 – 11 March 1935
- Preceded by: Tevfik Bıyıklıoğlu
- Succeeded by: Hasan Cemil Çambel

Personal details
- Born: 2 December 1876 Simbirsk, Russian Empire (now Ulyanovsk, Russia)
- Died: 11 March 1935 (aged 58) Istanbul, Turkey
- Occupation: politician, writer, ideologist

Yusuf Akçura (Tatar: Йосыф Хәсән улы Акчура, romanized: Yosıf Xəsən ulı Aqçura; Russian: Юсуф Хасанович Акчурин, romanized: Jusuf Hasanovich Akchurin; 2 December 1876 – 11 March 1935) was a prominent Turkish politician, writer and ideologist of ethnic Russian Tatar origin. He developed into a prominent ideologue and advocate of Pan-Turkism during the early republican period, whose writings became widely read and who became one of the leading university professors in Istanbul.

== Biography ==
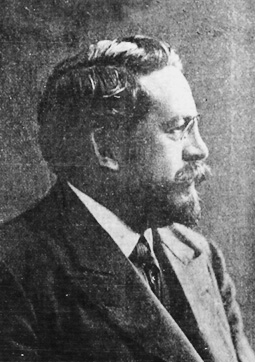
Yusuf Akçura in his early days

He was born in Simbirsk, Russian Empire to a Tatar family and lived there until he and his mother emigrated to the Ottoman Empire when he was seven. He received primary and secondary education in Constantinople and entered the Harbiye Mektebi (Military College) in 1895. He took up a post in the Erkân-i Harbiye (General Staff Course), a prestigious training programme for the Ottoman military. But in 1896 he was accused of belonging to the Young Turk movement and was exiled to Trablusgarb in Fezzan, Ottoman Libya.

He escaped exile in 1899 and made his way to Paris where he began to emerge as a staunch advocate of Turkish nationalism and Pan-Turkism. There he contributed to Meşveret, a periodical published by the exiled members of the Committee of Union and Progress. He returned to Russia in 1903, settling in Zöyebașı beside Simbirsk and began to write extensively on the topic. He garnered most attention for his 1904 work Üç Tarz-ı Siyaset (Three Types of Policy), which was originally printed in the Cairo-based magazine Türk. The work encouraged the formation of an Ottoman Nation with a citizenship based on Islam and compared such a nation with Germany, Switzerland and France which according to him had also emerged from different races. Further on, he demanded to abandon the multi-ethnic concept of the Ottoman Empire and to focus on the assimilation of the non-Turks. He was one of the co-founders of the Ittifaq al-Muslimin, a Muslim party in Russia. In 1908 he returned to Istanbul where his ideas began to gain more interest after the Young Turk Revolution and the proclamation of the Second Constitutional Era. In 1911 he founded the Türk Yurdu Association together with Ahmet Ağaoğlu, Ali Hüseynzade and others. In November 1911 The association began to publish a magazine bearing its name, Türk Yurdu, which sought to become the intellectual force behind Turkish nationalism. In June 1911, he became a leading force within the Turkish Hearths, acting as their Vice-President.

In 1915 he founded again with Ahmet Ağaoğlu and Ali Hüseynzade the Turco-Tatar Committee (TTC) in Istanbul which had the aim to defend the rights of the Turco-Tatar Muslims in Russia. In June 1916 the TTC sent a delegation to the Conference of Nationalities, but it could not present a united resolution. Every delegate had to represent his nation. Akçura therefore spoke for the Tatars and demanded the same civil, political and religious rights as the Russian Orthodox and the right to teach in their native tongue. In July 1916 he visited Zurich and made contact with Vladimir Lenin. He wanted to know what fate awaited the Turkic peoples from the leader of the revolutionaries. In summer 1917, he was given the task to negotiate the liberation of the Ottoman prisoners in Russia by the Ottoman Red Crescent. He therefore first travelled to Denmark, Sweden and stayed about one year in Russia.

After having accomplished his mission for the Ottoman Red Crescent, he returned to Turkey and joined the newly founded party Milli Türk Fırkası in October 1919. Differing from the regime somewhat, he defined the Turkish identity in purely ethnic terms and came to look outside the borders of the country for a kinship with other Turkic peoples. He also called for creation of a national economy and a move away from Islamic values (an area in which he clashed with Ziya Gökalp, as Akçura wanted a secular Turkey, fearing that Pan-Islamism would hinder nationalist development), meaning that he was largely sympathetic to Kemal Atatürk. In 1923 he was elected MP for Istanbul, which he stayed until 1934, when he was elected MP for Kars. In 1932 he became president of the Turkish Historical Society.

He died in Istanbul in 1935. He was laid to rest at the Edirnekapı Martyr's Cemetery in Istanbul.

== See also ==
- List of Tatars
