= Yesemek Quarry and Sculpture Workshop =

Yesemek
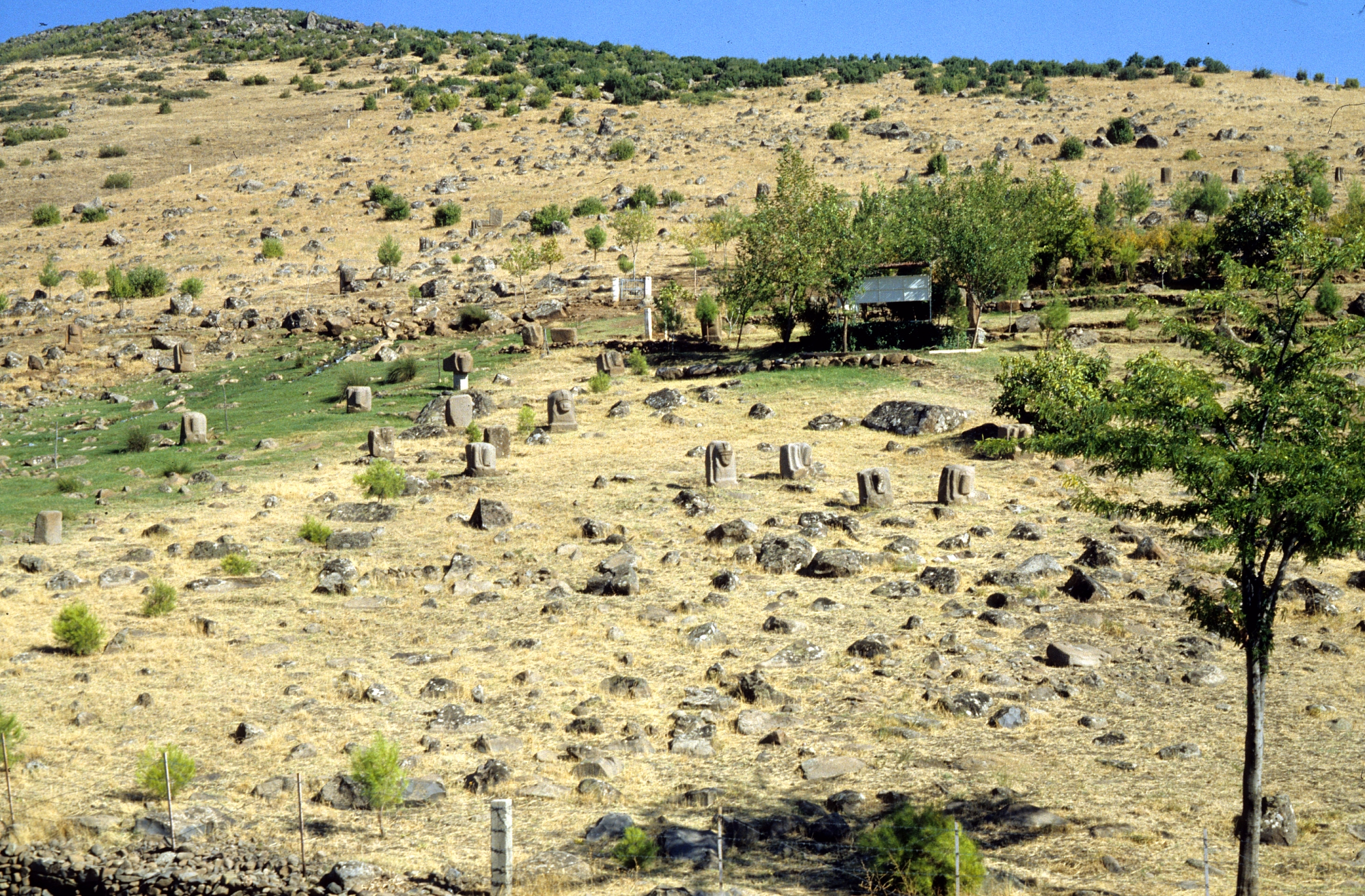
- General view of the workshop

- Location within Turkey
- 36°53′35″N 36°44′40″E
- Type: Workshop and quarry
- Cultures: Hittites
- Location: Islahiye, Gaziantep Province, Turkey
- Region: Southeastern Anatolia

History
- Built: 14th century BC
- Built by: Suppiluliuma I

Site notes
- Material: Basalt
- Area: 100,000 m^{2} (1,100,000 sq ft)
- Archaeologists: Felix von Luschan; Bahadır Alkım; İlhan Temizsoy
- Condition: In ruins

Yesemek Quarry and Sculpture Workshop is an open-air museum and archaeological site in Gaziantep Province, Turkey. The site was a quarry in Hittite times and occupies a 100000 m^{2} area, making it the largest known stonemasonry workshop from the ancient Near East.

== Geography ==
The museum is to the south of the village of Yesemek in İslahiye ilçe (district) of Gaziantep Province at 36°53′35″N 36°44′40″E. It is situated on the western slopes of the mounteneous area and to the east of Tahtalı Dam reservoir. Its distance to village is about 1.5 kilometres (0.93 mi), to İslahiye is 23 kilometres (14 mi) and to Gaziantep is 113 kilometres (70 mi). Visitors can drive to the site from Gaziantep, İskenderun or Antakya.

== History of the excavations ==
The ruins were partially unearthed by Austrian archaeologist Felix von Luschan during his excavations at Zincirli to the north of the area in 1890. Between 1957-1961 Turkish archaeologist Bahadır Alkım continued excavations, revealing around 200 sculptures. The most recent work was carried out in the 1990s by İlhan Temizsoy, director of the Museum of Anatolian Civilizations and brought another hundred objects to light. The site is now an open-air museum administered by the Gaziantep Museum of Archaeology.

== History of the site ==
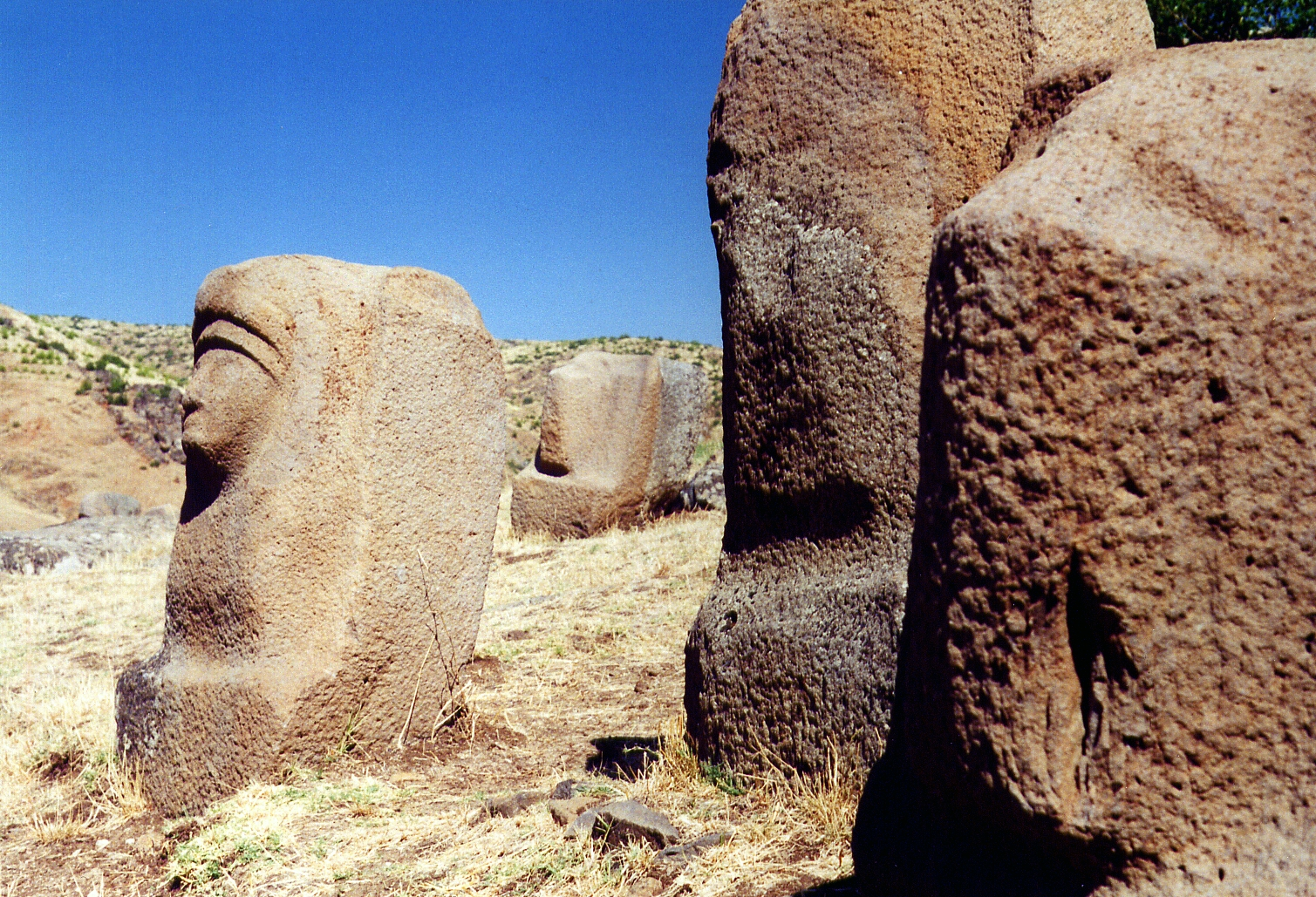

The site was a workshop of sculpture. It was established by the Hittite emperor Suppiluliuma I (r.1344–1322 BC) . With the collapse of the Hittite Empire, activity probably ceased, but the workshop was again active in the ninth century BC, when Yesemek was part of the Aramaic kingdom of Sam'al. The artefacts from this period show Aramaic and Assyrian influence. In the 8th century BC, the region came under Assyrian control and the site was abandoned once more. It is not clear whether the artisans simply stopped working or were transported to the Assyrian capital. The area around the workshop is mostly covered by basalt and the raw material of the sculptures is basalt. The total area of the workshop is about 100,000 square metres (1,100,000 sq ft). Among the 300 unearthed items there are sphinx, lions, chariot, gods etc.

=== Sculptures ===
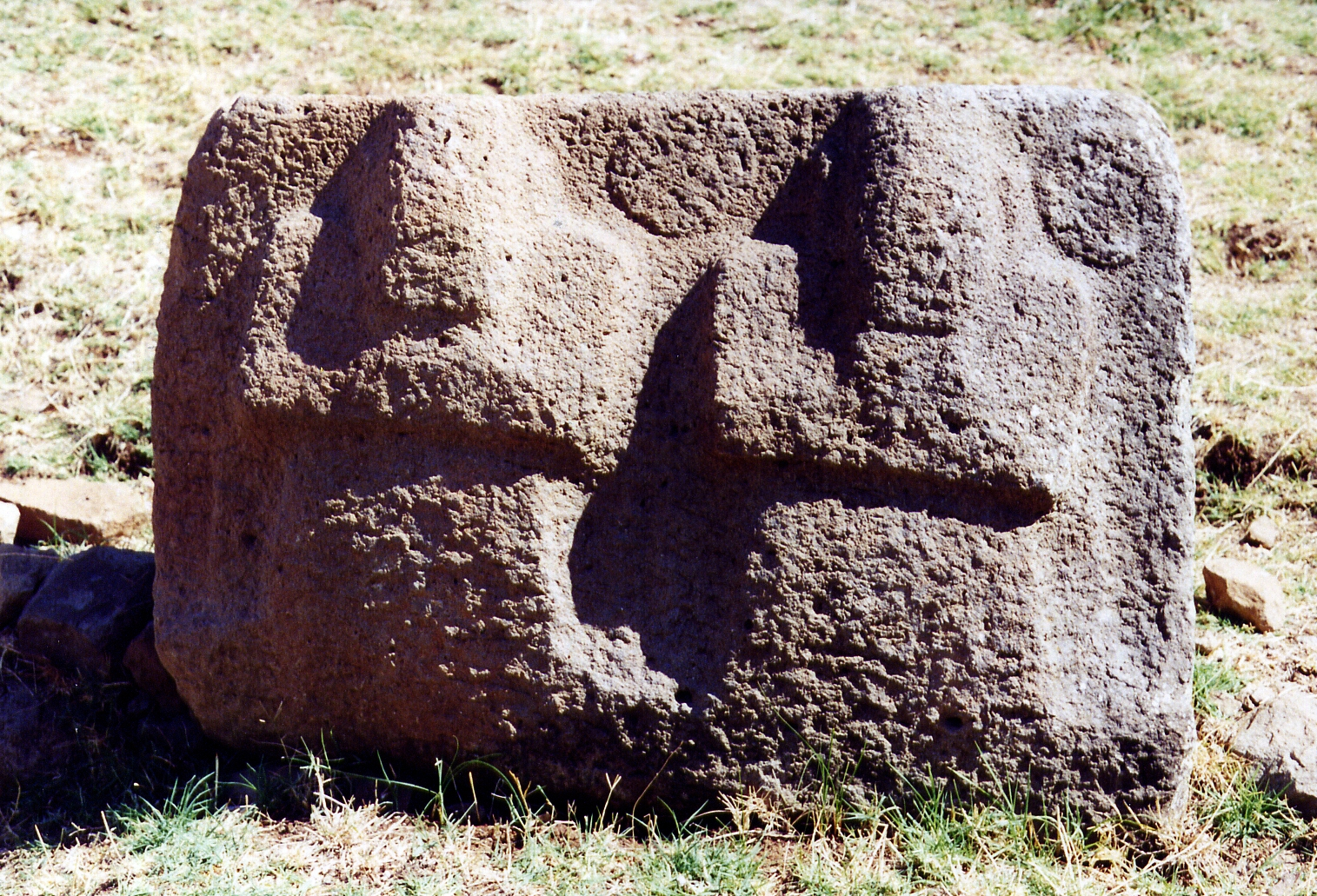
Mountain gods

There are several basic types of sculpture on the site. The majority are sphinxes with a female head and a lion's body or lions (some of which are winged). These sphinxes and lions were probably intended to flank the gates of Hittite cities, palaces and temples, and are very similar to the door sculptures found at Hattusa and Alaca Höyük. In addition, there are groups of mountain gods with arms crossed over their chests, reliefs of hunting scenes, and a bear-person. These objects are believed to be special commissions. The mountain gods closely resemble the ones that were used as supports in the well sanctuary at Eflatun Pınar. Sculptures can be seen in all stages of production. A particularly noteworthy sphinx found at Zincirli is now on display in the Museum of Gaziantep.

=== Stoneworking ===
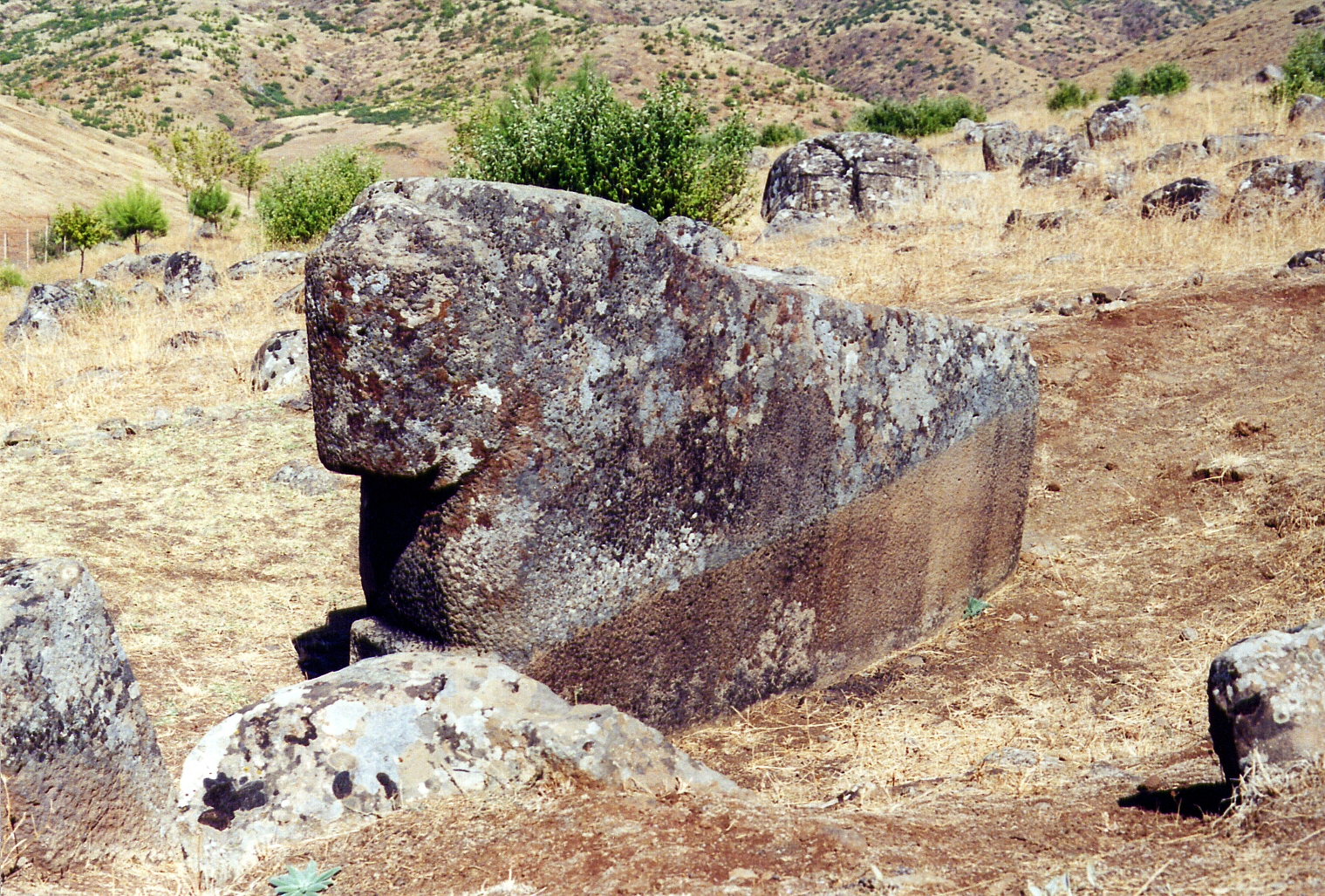
Door lion

In the quarry, large blocks of red basalt were broken up, by striking pre-existing cracks with hammer and chisel. Wooden wedges were inserted into these cracks and water was poured over them. The waterlogged wood expanded, splitting off large fragments. The rough shape of figures was carved from these with a chisel and the outer surface was smoothed. Fine carving followed and then the piece was polished. The final details were generally not done in the workshop, but at their final destinations. How they were transported from the quarry is not clear.

== World Heritage Status ==
This site was added to the UNESCO World Heritage Tentative List on April 13, 2012 in the Cultural category.

== Bibliography ==
- Marianne Mehling (ed.): Knaurs Kulturführer in Farbe Türkei. Droemer-Knaur 1987 ISBN 3-426-26293-2
