= Helmuth Theodor Bossert =

German and Turkish art historian and archaeologist (1889–1961)

- Born: 11 September 1889; Landau, German Empire
- Died: 5 February 1961 (aged 71); Istanbul, Turkey
- Citizenship: German, Turkish
- Education: History of art, history, archaeology and German studies
- Alma mater: Heidelberg University, University of Strasbourg, Ludwig-Maximilians-Universität München, University of Freiburg
- Occupations: Art historian, philologist and archaeologist
- Known for: Excavation of the Hittite site Karatepe ln Turkey, and decryption of Luwian hieroglyphs

Helmuth Theodor Bossert (11 September 1889 – 5 February 1961) was a German and Turkish art historian, philologist and archaeologist. He is best known for his excavations of the Hittite fortress city at Karatepe, Turkey, and the discovery of bilingual inscriptions, which enabled the translation of Hittite hieroglyphs.

== Early life ==
Bossert was born in Landau, German Empire, on 11 September 1889. He was educated in history of art, history, archaeology and German studies at Heidelberg University, the University of Strasbourg, the Ludwig-Maximilians-Universität München, and the University of Freiburg. In 1913, he was awarded the title PhD by University of Freiburg with a thesis on "Der ehemalige Hochaltar in Unserer Lieben Frauen Pfarrkirche zu Sterzing in Tirol" ("The former high altar in the Parish of "Our Lady of Marsh" to Sterzing in Tyrol"). He began to work as an assistant at the Freiburg Library.

Subsequently, he completed his military service in the German Army during World War I. After the World War, Bossert found a job at Ernst Wasmuth Publishing in Berlin, where he worked as lector and author in ethnology of diverse ethnic groups and times. He lost his job when the publishing company suffered from the 1929 Great Depression. He wrote critiques on the effects of World War I with his books Kamerad im Westen ("Comrade in the West") published in 1930, which became a bestseller, and Wehrlos hinter der Front ("Defenseless Behind the Front") in 1931. Between 1919 and 1934, Bossert authored around fifteen books on various topics from ancient Cretan civilisation to European folk art.

Financially independent through the royalties from his books' sales, he devoted himself from 1930 on to the study of Hittite hieroglyphics. He soon became a notable expert in the translation of Cretan and Hittite pictographics. He was granted a study journey to Turkey by the Notgemeinschaft der Deutschen Wissenschaft (Emergency Association of German Science) in 1933.

== Turkey years ==
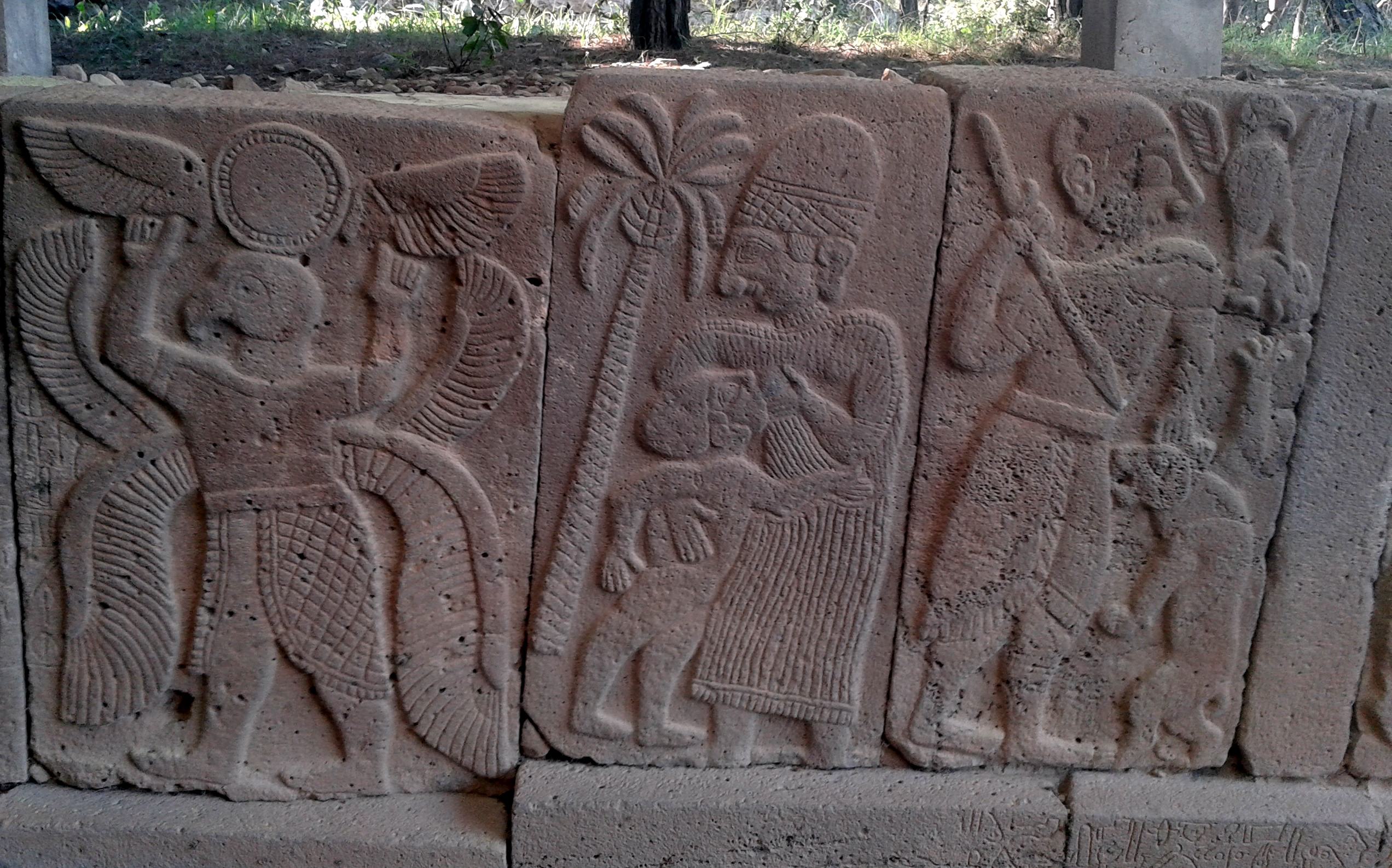
A late Hittite stone relief at the Karatepe-Aslantaş Open-Air Museum.

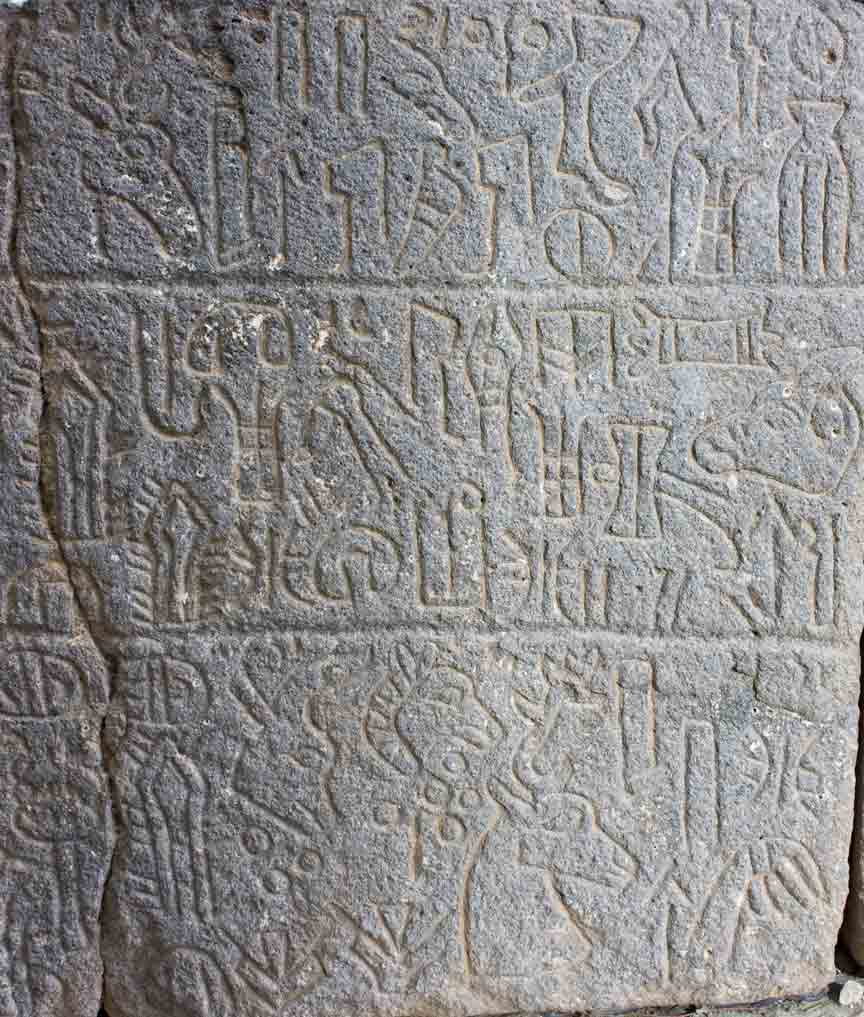
Luwian hieroglyphs at the Karatepe-Aslantaş Open-Air Museum.

The main purpose of his journey to Turkey was to take part at the archaeological excavations under the leadership of German Kurt Bittel in Hattusa (formerly Boğazköy, today Boğazkale), the capital of the Hittite Empire (c. 1600 BC–c. 1178 BC).

During his stay in Turkey, he was appointed professor of "Linguistics and Art of Ancient Asia Minor" at Istanbul University in April 1934. He became later director of the newly established Institute of Archaeology. He authored scientific publications on the artefacts unearthed at Hittite sites, he visited in the summer breaks. Between 1939 and 1946, his scientific research work came almost to halt due to World War II.

After 1946, he discovered the late Hittite ruins in Karatepe in southern Turkey along with the Turkish archaeologists Bahadır Alkım and Halet Çambel. The Karatepe Bilingual found there eventually led to the decryption of Hittite hieroglyphics -according to current understanding Luwian hieroglyphs or Anatolian hieroglyphs.

In 1947, he acquired↘ Turkish citizenship, and remarried to Turkish woman Hürmüz Hanim. Archaeologist Eva-Maria Bossart, his 1925-born daughter from the first marriage, worked under him and Çambel at excavations in Turkey until 1956. In 1954, Bossert began to publish the scientific journal Jahrbuch für Kleinasiatische Forschung ("Yearbook for Asia Minor Research"), which came out for three years. From 1955 on, Bossert carried out several archaeological excavations at Mopsuestia in southern Turkey.

In 1959, he became emeritus at Istanbul University. He was appointed honorary professor in Freiburg, but stayed, however, in Istanbul. Bossart died at age 71 in Istanbul on 5 February 1961.

== Bibliography ==
Bossert authored 34 books and 107 articles in total. Some of his publications are as follows:

- Der ehemalige Hochaltar in Unserer Lieben Frauen Pfarrkirche zu Sterzing in Tirol, Innsbruck 1914
- Das Ornamentwerk. Eine Sammlung angewandter farbigen Ornamente und Dekorationen. Unter besonderer Berücksichtigung der weniger bekannten Kulturen für den praktischen Gebrauch, Wasmuth, Berlin 1924
- Volkskunst in Europa. Nahezu 2100 Beispiele unter besonderer Berücksichtigung der Ornamentik auf 132 Tafeln, darunter 100 in mehrfarbiger originalgetreuer Wiedergabe, Wasmuth, Berlin 1926
- Geschichte des Kunstgewerbes aller Zeiten und Völker, 6 Bände, Wasmuth, Berlin 1928–1935
- Kamerad im Westen, 1930
- Wehrlos hinter der Front, 1931
- Šantaš und Kupapa. Neue Beiträge zur Entzifferung der kretischen und hethitischen Bilderhandschrift, 1932
- Altanatolien, 1942
- Die Ausgrabungen auf dem Karatepe (Erster Vorbericht) – Karatepe Kazilari. Birinci ön-rapor, Ankara 1950
- Altsyrien. Kunst und Handwerk in Cypern, Syrien, Palästina, Transjordanien und Arabien von den Anfängen bis zum völligen Aufgehen in der griechisch-römischen Kultur, 1951

== See also ==
- Karatepe-Aslantaş Open-Air Museum
