= Karatepe-Aslantaş Open-Air Museum =

Open-air museum in Osmaniye Province, Turkey

- Karatepe-Aslantaş Açık Hava Müzesi
- Location of Karatepe-Aslantaş Open-Air Museum in Turkey.
- Established: 1958; 68 years ago
- Location: Kadirli, Osmaniye Province, Turkey
- Coordinates: 37.30022°N 36.25004°E
- Type: Archaeology

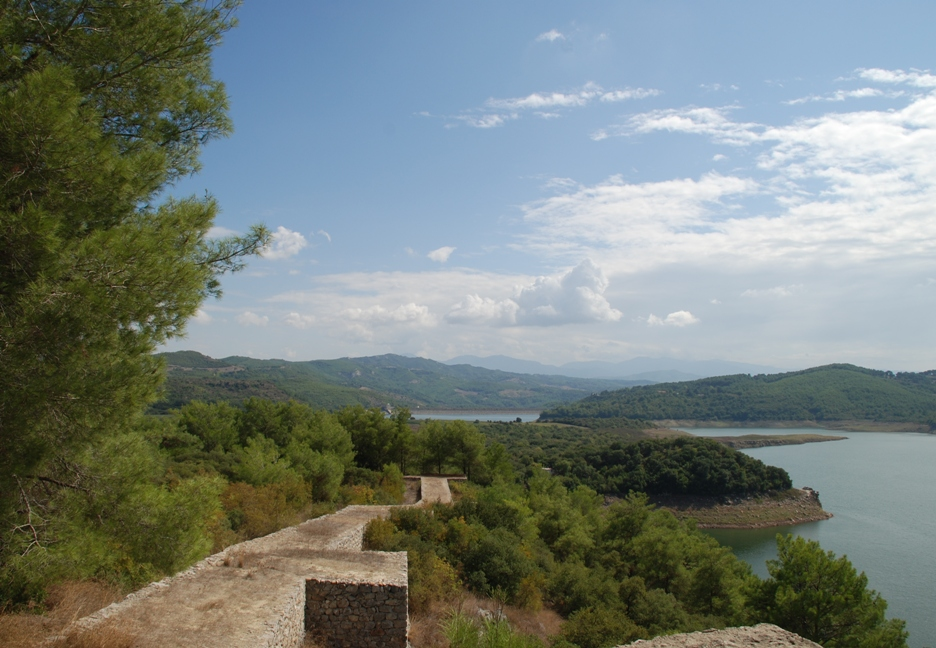
Fortress wall in the open-air museum.

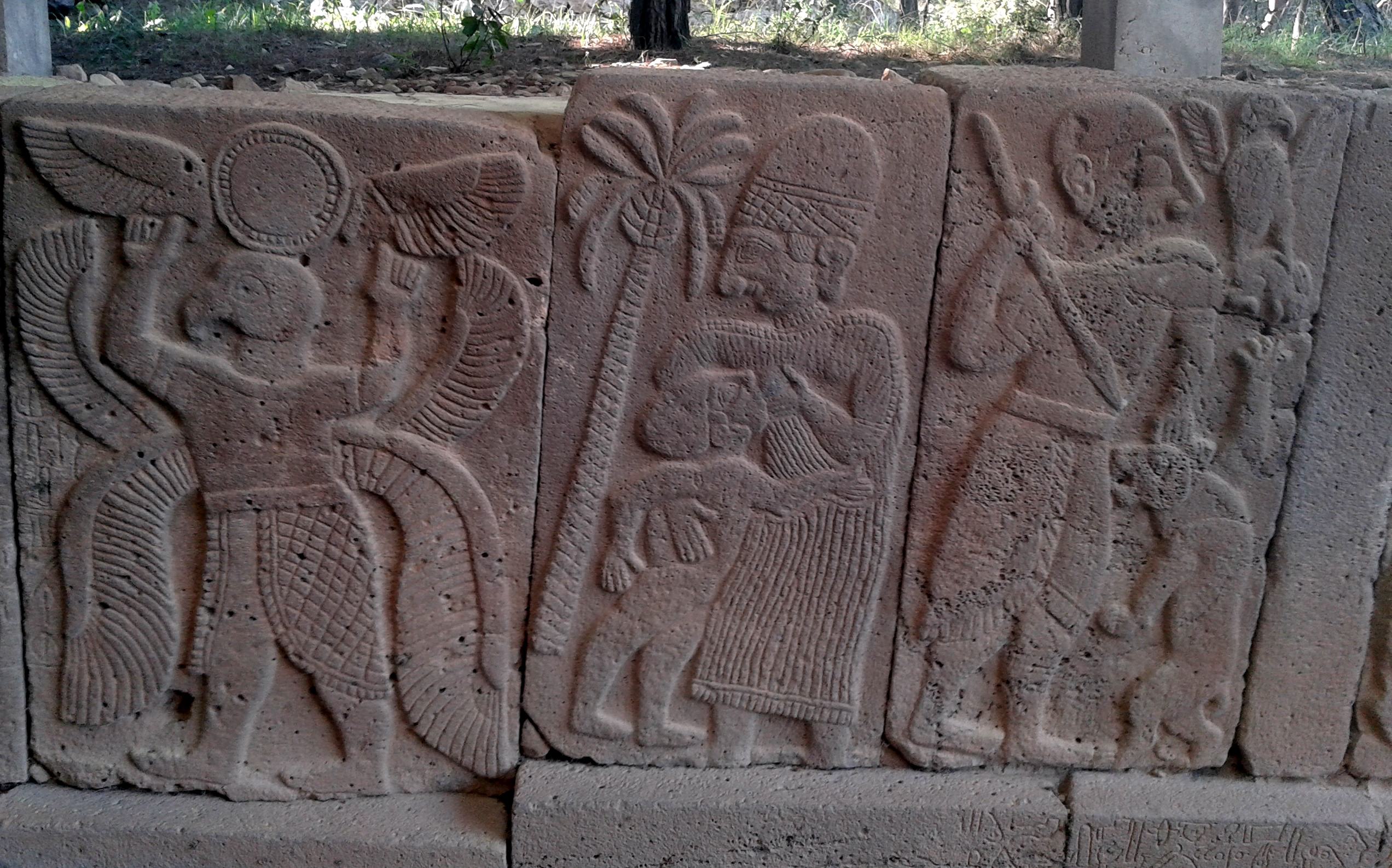
Hittite stone relief in the open-air museum.

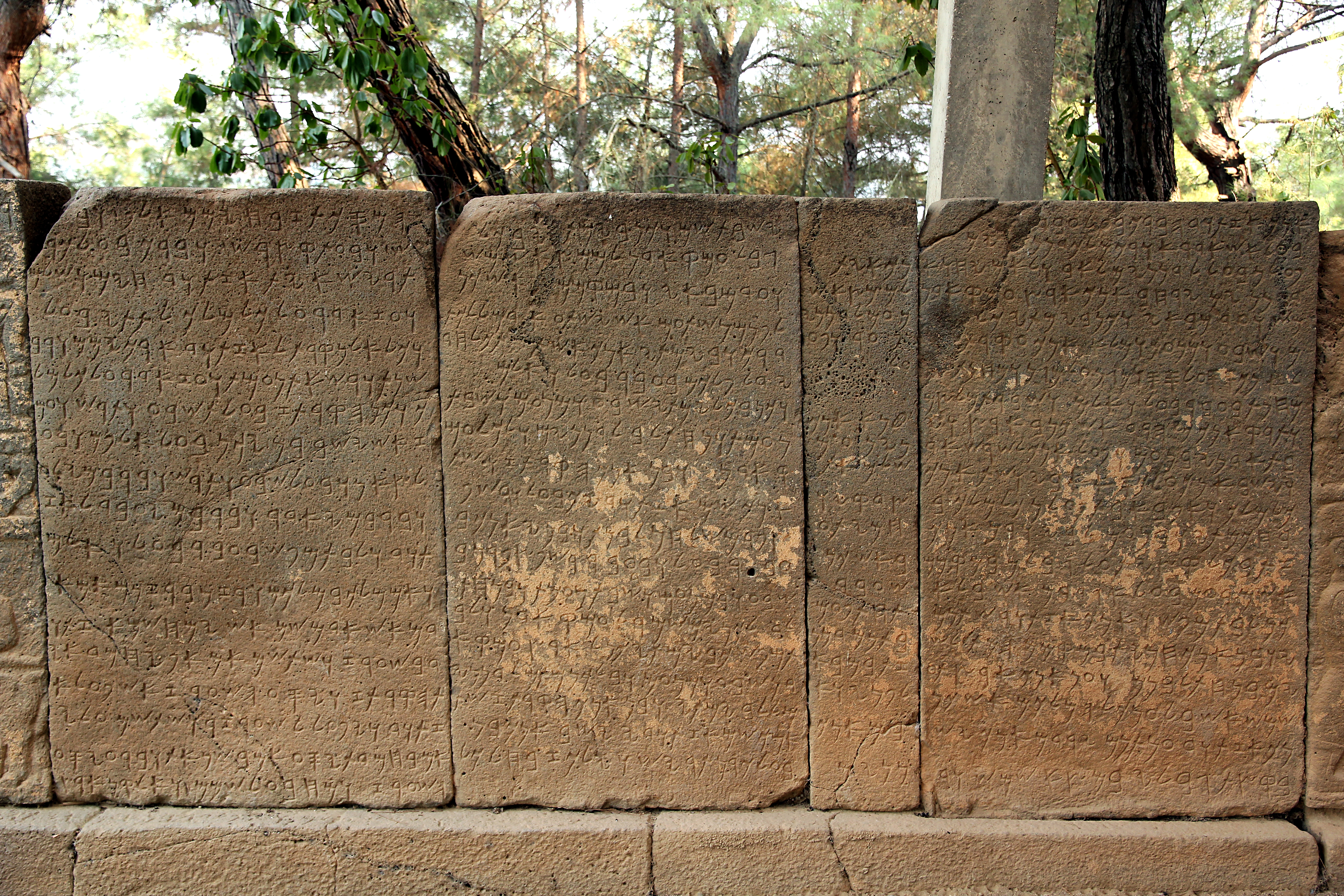
Phoenician alphabet at North Gate.

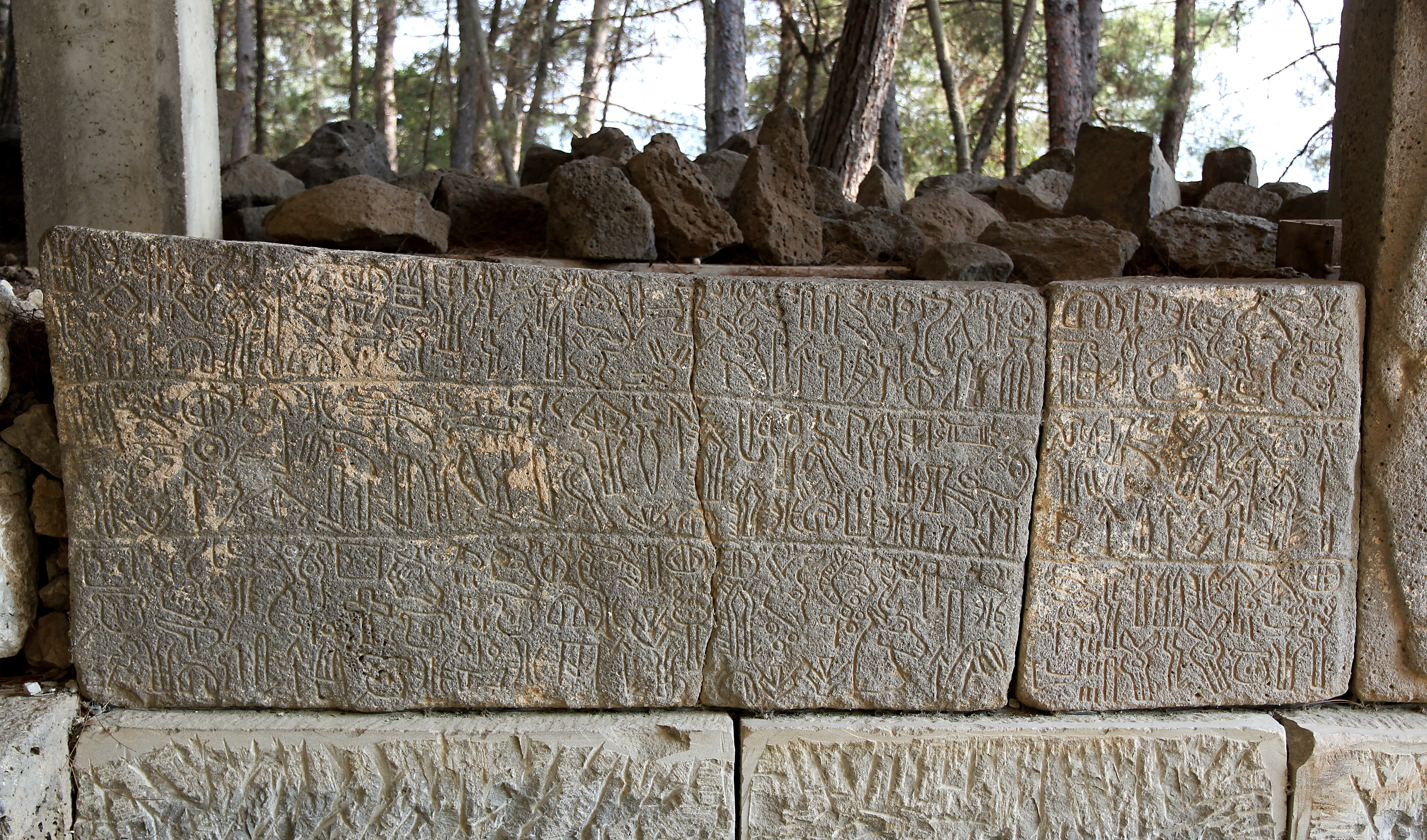
Hieroglyphic Luwian at South Gate.

Karatepe-Aslantaş Open-Air Museum (Turkish: Karatepe-Aslantaş Açık Hava Müzesi) is an open-air museum in Osmaniye Province, Turkey. Karatepe ("black hill") is the location while Aslantaş ("lion stone") refers to the lion figure on stone sculptures. The site is situated inside a national park with the same name.

== Location ==
The museum is located north of the 638 m (2,093 ft)-high Karatepe at Kızyusuflu village in Kadirli district of Osmaniye Province. Its distance to Kadirli is 22 km (14 mi) and to Osmaniye 30 km (19 mi). It is situated to the west of Aslantaş Dam resorvoir, and is part of the Karatepe-Aslantaş National Park.

The location is named Karatepe-Aslantaş to distinguish it from other places with the name Aslantaş, which are named by the locals after lion stone statues. The museum ground is located on a hill in a woodland landscape overlooking the Andırın Plain, and is a peninsula surrounded on three sides by the Aslantaş Dam reservoir.

== History ==
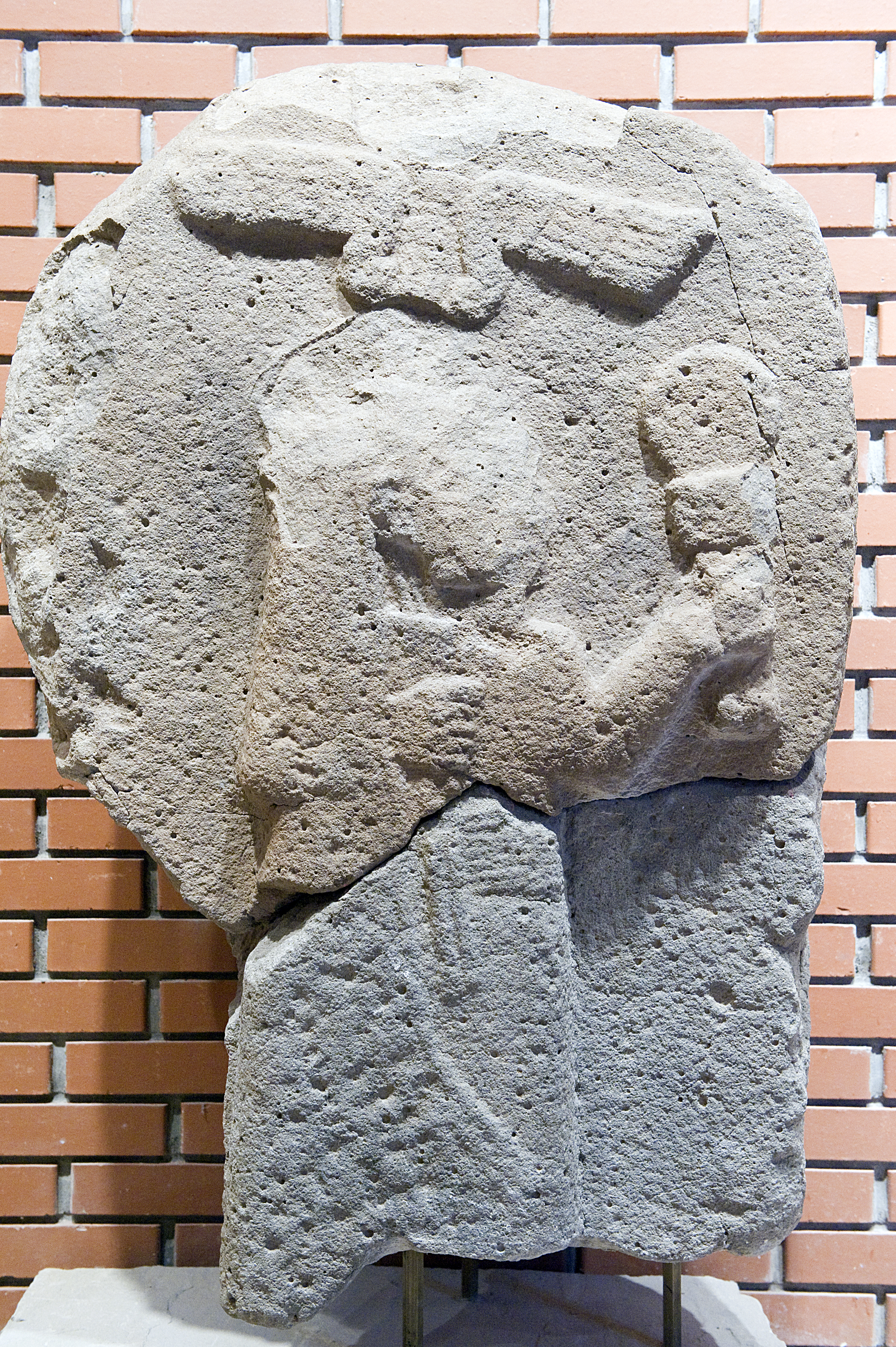
The goddess Kubaba carrying a mirror; 9th century BC. Also known as the Queen of Karkemiş. Karatepe Museum

Karatepe is on the historic caravan trail, called Akyol, ("white road") which connects Cilicia with Central Anatolia over Andırın-Göksün. The route was used by Hittites, Crusaders and recently by the Yörüks.

The site contains the remains of an ancient fortress dating back to the 8th century BC. Originally named Azatiwadaya, the walled settlement was founded by Azatiwada, the king of Quwê, a Neo-Hittite kingdom. It was built for defense against invaders from the north. The fortification and other territory areas of the kingdom were conquered by the Assyrian Empire from the east either in 720–725 BC term or in 680 BC.

The site was accidentally discovered by sheepmen from Saimbeyli. They informed Ekrem Kuşçu, the village school teacher, who in turn notified Naci Kum, the director of Adana Museum. The government commissioned Helmuth Theodor Bossert (1889–1961), German professor of archaeology at Istanbul University, to conduct excavations, which began in Spring 1946. Turkish female archaeologist Halet Çambel (1916–2014) was a key figure in the archaeologists team. Bahadır Alkım (1915–1981) joined later the excavations, which were accomplished in 1952. Upon Çambel's efforts, the archaeological site and its close surroundings were established as the Karatepe-Aslantaş National Park with effect of September 28, 1958.

== Open-air museum ==
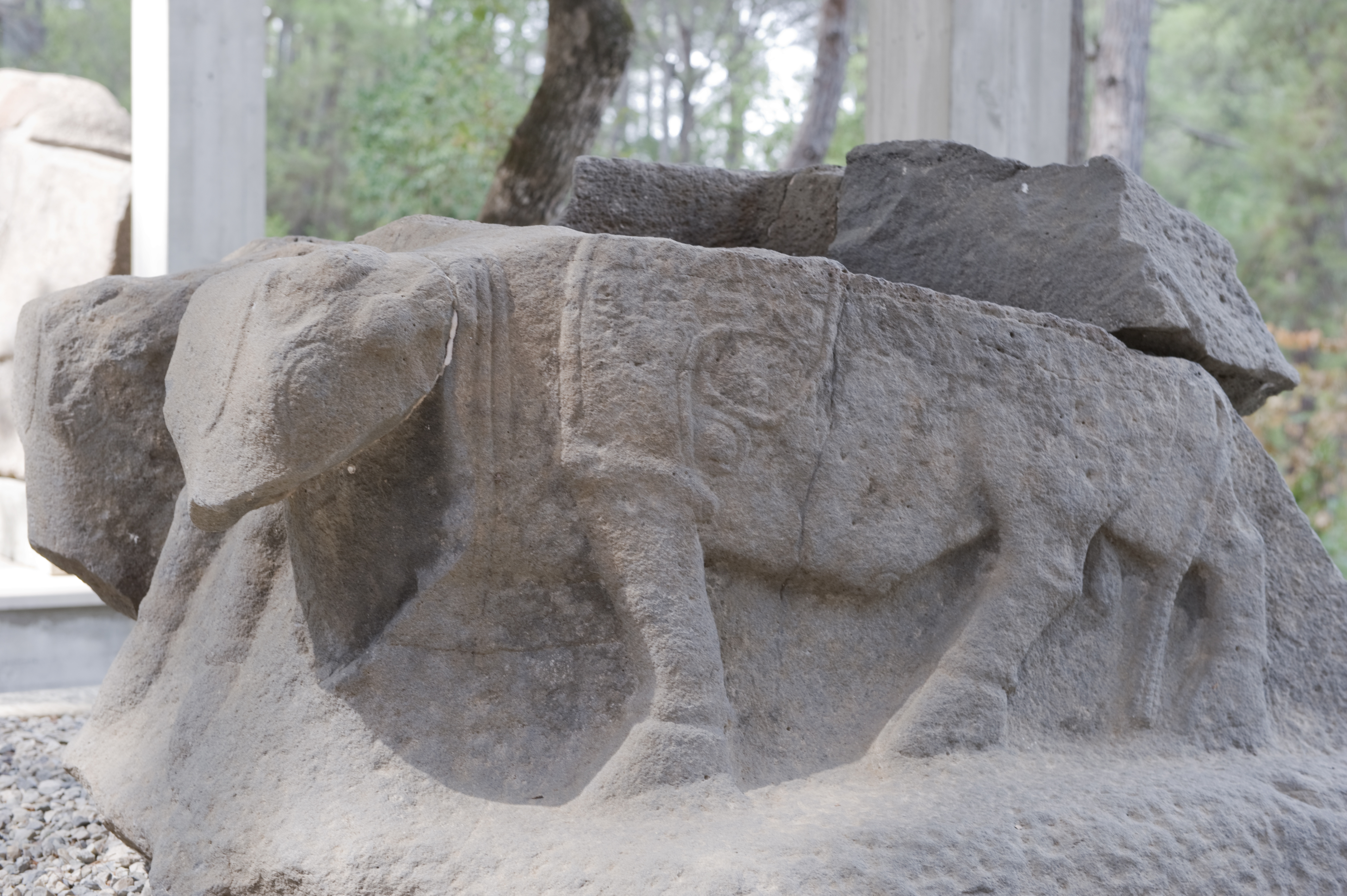
A Hittite bull statue at the Karatepe Museum

The ruined inner and outer walls of the fortress are 4–6 m (13–20 ft) high and 2–4 m (6.6–13.1 ft) thick. The inside of the double stone walls without mortar were filled with rubble and soil. The fortification stretches over 376 m (1,234 ft) in the south-north direction and 196 m (643 ft) in the east-west direction. The wall construction is fortified at 18–20 m (59–66 ft) distance with 34 rectangular bastions in total, of which only 28 could be identified. The walls in the east-west direction were restored in accordance with the original.

The fortress has two gates, one in the southwest and the other in the northeast. At the southwestern gate, there are two lion stone statues. The walls of the two chambers flanking the gate are covered with reliefs on basalt stone, which depict the faith and way of life of that time. The Karatepe Bilingual, an inscription in Phoenician alphabet and Hieroglyphic Luwian with the same text, is situated there. Inside the gate, there is a stone statue of the Ancient Egyptian dwarf deity Bes and a 3 m (9.8 ft)-tall stone statue of the Phoenician thunder god Baal. At the northeastern gate, two stone statues of sphinx, a mythical creature with, the head of a human and the body of a lion, are placed. The flanking chambers contain several reliefs and another Karatepe Bilingual. The Karatepe Bilingual enabled the decryption of Anatolian hieroglyphs, which go back up to 20th century BC, with the help of the Phoenician alphabet.

Atop the hill, grain wells and two burnt-out building ruins, which are believed to be palaces, are situated. The majority of the artifacts in the open-air museum were not dislocated. Only small items were taken into a museum building for exhibition.

Visitors can receive a multi-lingual visual presentation on Karatepe before starting their tour in the open-air museum.
