= Karatepe bilingual =

Bilingual inscription on stone slabs

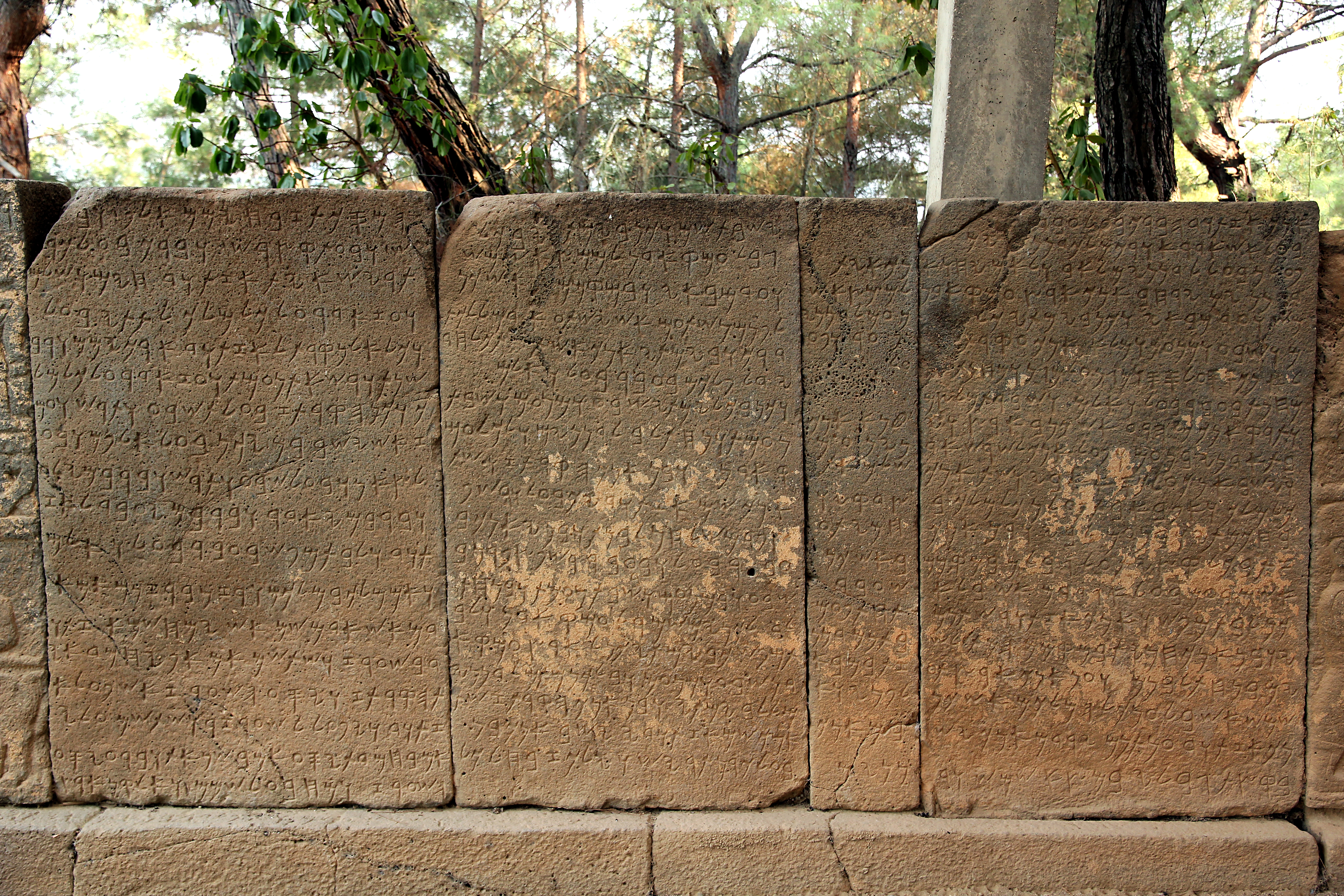
- Example text of Phoenician alphabet at Karatepe-Aslantaş Open-Air Museum
- Material: Stone
- Writing: Phoenician alphabet and Luwian hieroglyphs
- Created: 8th century BC
- Discovered: 1946; Osmaniye, Turkey
- Present location: Karatepe-Aslantaş Open-Air Museum, southern Turkey

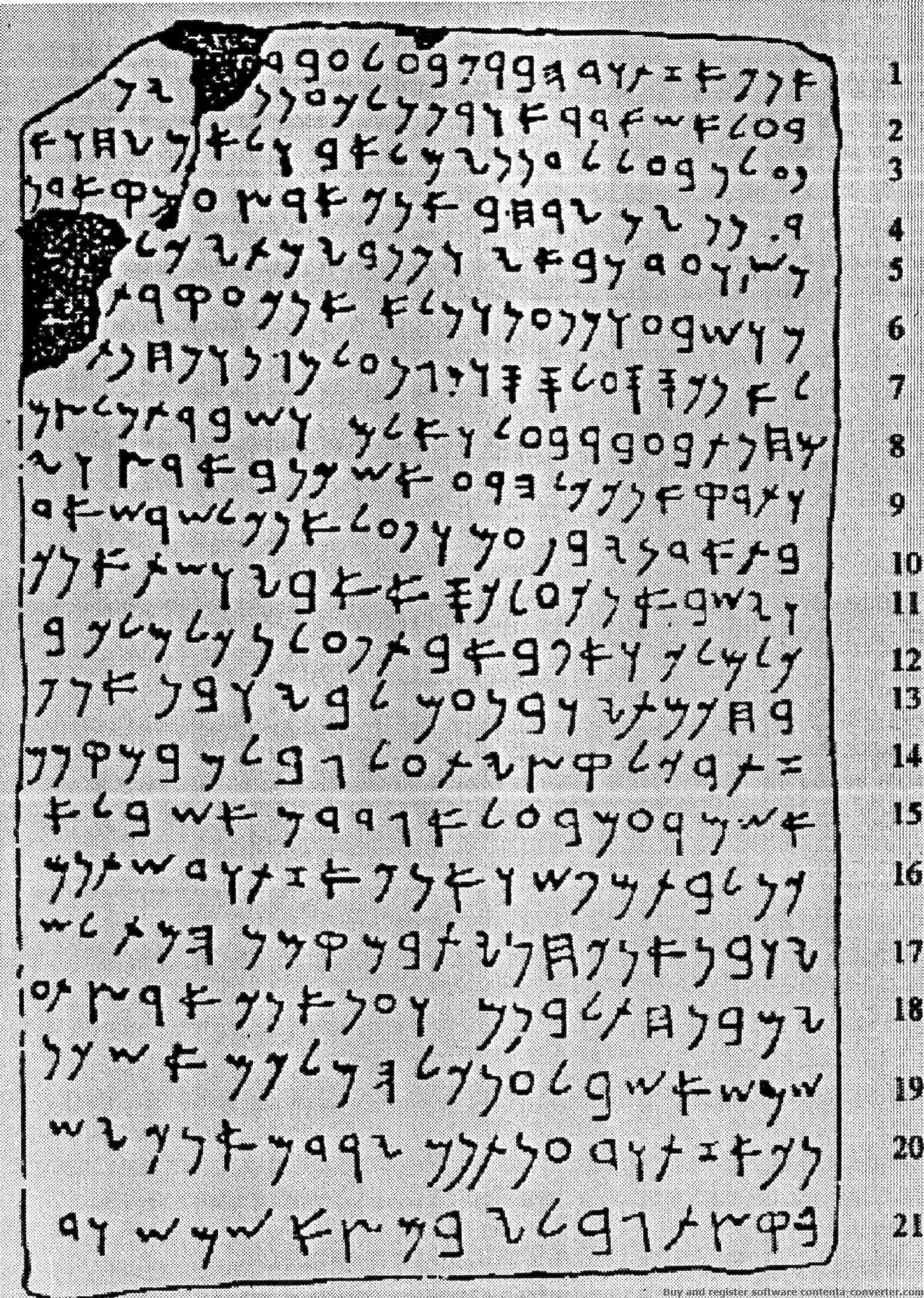
Example text of Phoenician alphabet at Karatepe-Aslantaş Open-Air Museum.

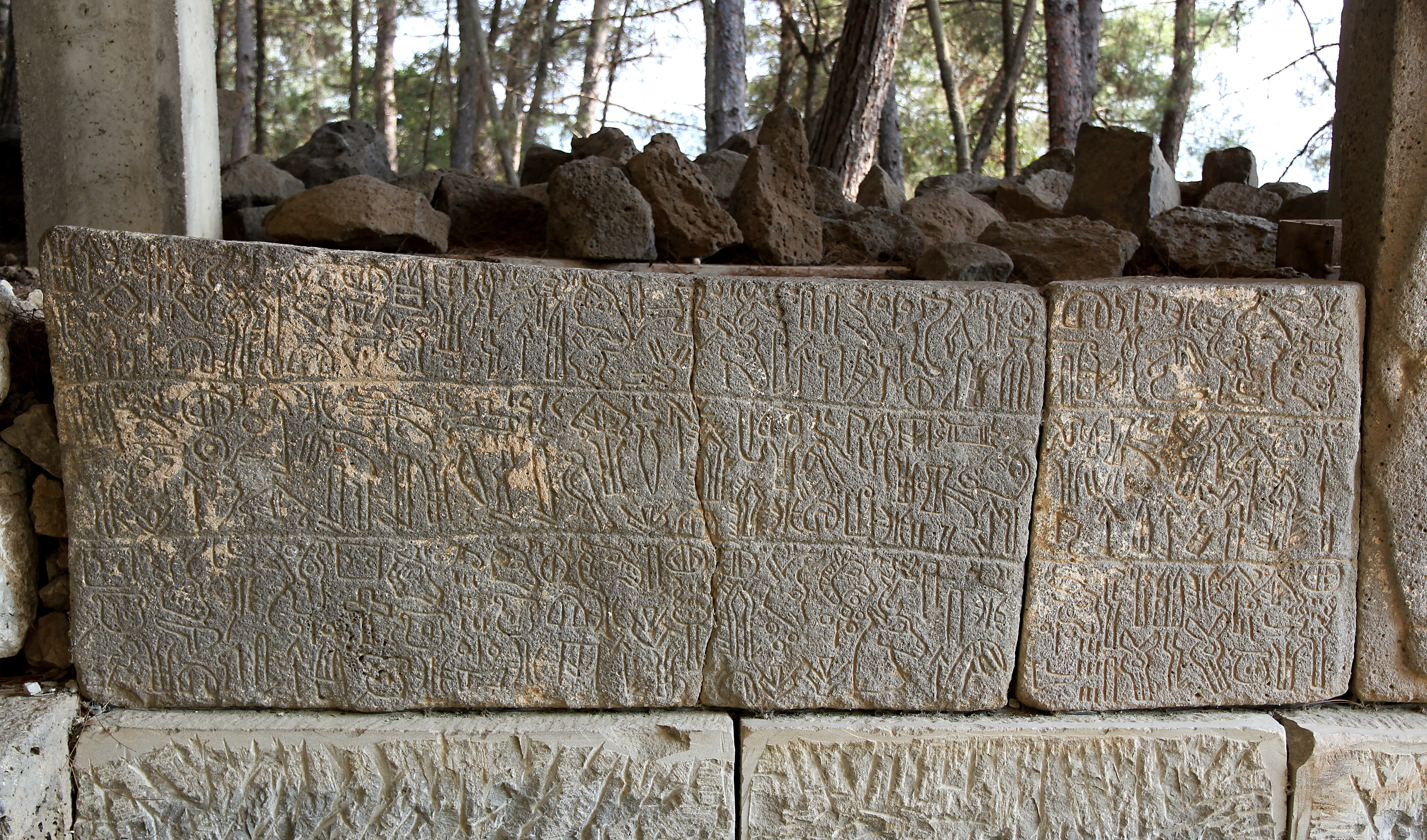
Luwian hieroglyphs part of the Karatepe bilingual at the South Gate.

Example text in Hieroglyphic Luwian at Karatepe-Aslantaş Open-Air Museum

The Karatepe bilingual (8th century BC), also known as the Azatiwada inscription, is a bilingual inscription on stone slabs consisting of Phoenician and Luwian text each, which enabled the decipherment of the Anatolian hieroglyphs. The artifacts were discovered at Karatepe, southern Turkey by the archaeologists Helmuth Theodor Bossert (1889–1961) and Halet Çambel (1916–2014) in 1946.

This inscription has served archaeologists as a Rosetta Stone for deciphering the Luwian glyphs. The inscription is known as KAI 26.

== Contents ==
The inscription reflects the activities of the kings of Adana from the "house of Mopsos", given in Hieroglyphic Luwian as mu-ka-sa- (often rendered as 'Moxos') and in Phoenician as Mopsos in the form mpš. It was composed in Phoenician and then translated to Hieroglyphic Luwian.

This geographical area of Cilicia was known in various historical periods under the names of Quwe (Que), Luwian Adanawa, Hiyawa, and Classical 'Cilicia of the Plain'. Adana is the modern city in the area.

As we learn from the inscription, its author is Azatiwada (or Azatiwata), the ruler of the town of Azatiwataya. He was also its founder; the inscription commemorates the town's foundation. Azatiwataya seems to have been one of the frontier towns of Adanawa.

According to Ilya Yakubovich, the rulers of Quwe claimed Greek descent but, at some point, they adopted the Phoenician language. Their use of the Luwian was a concession to the indigenous population of Que.

After the Greek Linear B script had been forgotten, these Greek colonists started using the Phoenician script, and this represented the first step toward the creation of the Greek alphabet.

== Azatiwada ==
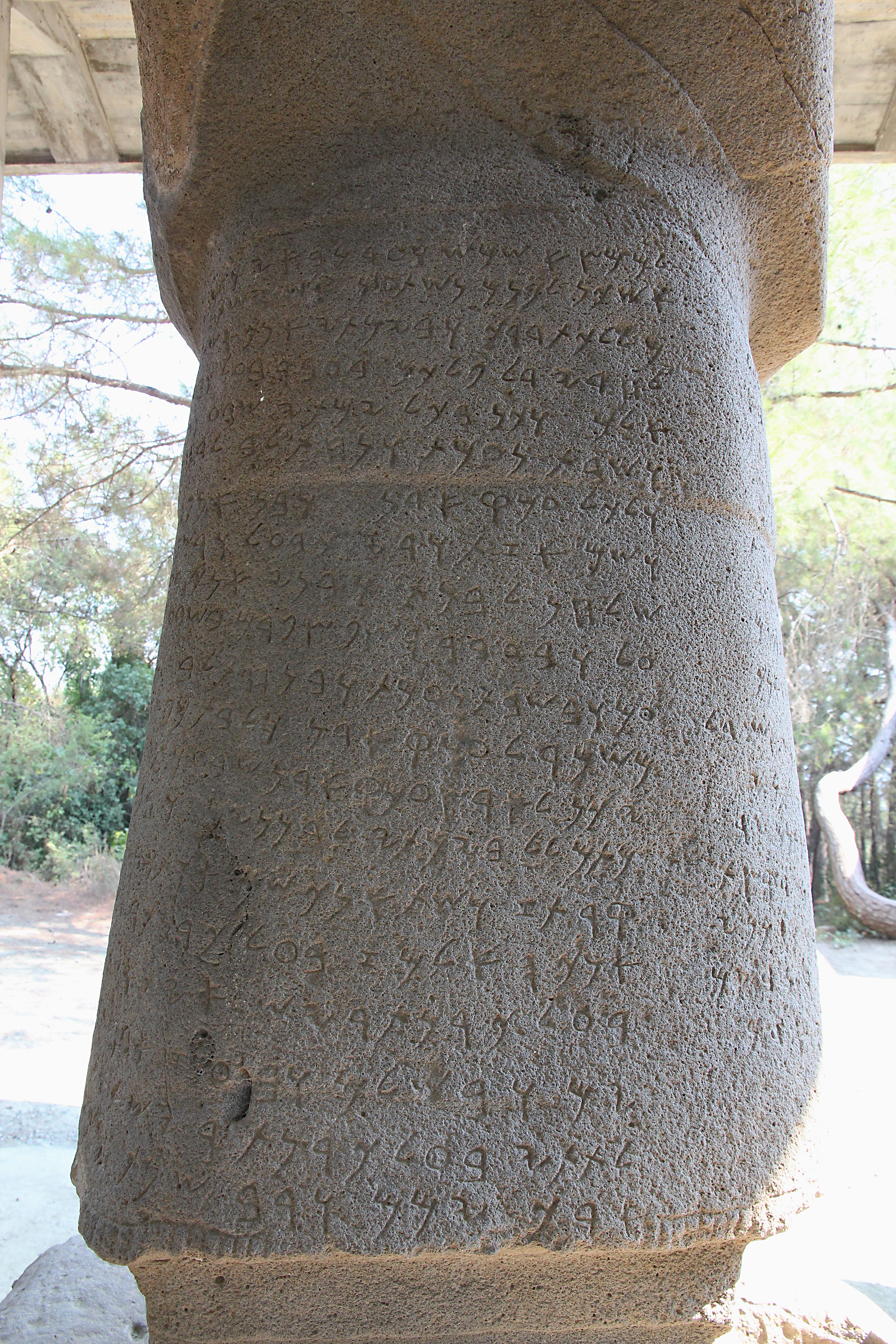
Phoenician text of the Karatepe bilingual at Karatepe-Aslantaş Open-Air Museum

Azatiwada was a local ruler in Cilicia. He was installed as ruler by Awariku (Urikki), king of Adanawa (Adana), who reigned in 738-732 BC. These lands paid tribute to Tiglath-Pileser III.

The text is an autobiographical account of Azatiwada's services to the kingdom of Adana where, according to the inscription, he later enthroned the descendants of Awariku. The inscription is assumed to date after his death in 709 BC. This dating is supported by the stylistic analyses of both the Phoenician text and the hieroglyphs.

From King Awariku also comes the Çineköy inscription, which is also a Phoenician-Luwian bilingual.

Awariku is also mentioned in the Hasanbeyli inscription, also from the nearby area of Samʼal (Zincirli).

== Inscription text ==
Placed at the fortress gates, the stones presenting the Karatepe bilingual inscription feature the "Call of Azatiwada" in the following text:

I am really Azatiwada,
Man of my Sun, the servant of Thunder God,
Rendered superior by Awariku, and the ruler of Adanawa,
Thunder God rendered me Mother and Father of Adanawa city, and
I am the one, who developed Adanawa city,
And I expanded Adanawa country, both westward and eastward,
And during my reign, I made Adanawa city tastes prosperity, satiety and comfort, and I filled the grain warehouses,
I added horse to horse, shield to shield, army to army, everything for Thunder God and the deities,
I defeated the feint of the feinters,
I expelled country's bad men,
I built palaces for myself, made my family comfortable, and ascended my father's throne, I made peace with all the kings,
Also the kings respected me as ancestor for my justice, my wisdom and my kind heart,
I built strong fortifications at all my borders, where bad men and gang leaders are,
I, Azatiwada, trod all the people, who did not obey the House of Mopsus,
I destroyed the fortifications there, I built fortifications so that people of Adanawa can live in peace and comfort,
I bet strong kingdoms in the west my predecessors were not able to,
I, Azatiwada, bet them, made them vassal to me, and resettled them within my borders in the east,
And during my reign, I expanded the borders of Adanawa both westward and eastward,
So that women nowadays wander spindling on the isolated trails, where men in the past feared to go,
And during my reign, there was prosperity, satiety, peace and comfort,
And Adanawa and Adanawa country were living in peace,
And I built this fortress, and named it Azatiwadaya,
Thunder God and the deities directed me to do this so that this fortress becomes protector of Adana Plains and the House of Mopsus,
During my reign, there was prosperity and peace in the territory of Adana Plains, no one of Adanawa people was sabred during my reign,
And I built this fortress, and named it Azatiwadaya,
I placed Thunder God there, and offered it sacrifices,
I sacrificed an ox every year, a sheep in the ploughing time and a sheep in the fall,
I blessed Thunder God, it endowed me long days, countless years and huge power over all kings,
And the folk, which settled in this country, owned ox, herd, food and drink, had plenty issue, and became servant to Azatiwada and the House of Mopsus thanks to Thunder God and the deities,
When a king among the kings, a prince among the princes or a nobleman among the noblemen erases the name of Azatiwada from this gate, carves any other name; furthermore covets this city, destroys this gate built by Azatiwada, builds another gate in its place, and carves his own name on it, destroys this gate with the purpose of greed, hatred or insult then Sky deity, Nature deity and Sun of the universe and generations of all deities will wipe out this king, this prince or this nobleman from the earth,
Only the name Azatiwada is eternal, forever like the name of the Sun and the Moon.

== Location ==
The stones featuring the Karatepe bilingual are situated along with many other statues and reliefs in stone at the Karatepe-Aslantaş Open-Air Museum, which is in turn part of the Karatepe-Aslantaş National Park.

== See also ==
- Luwian-Aramean states
