= Hasanbeyli inscription =

Phoenician language inscription from the 8th century BC

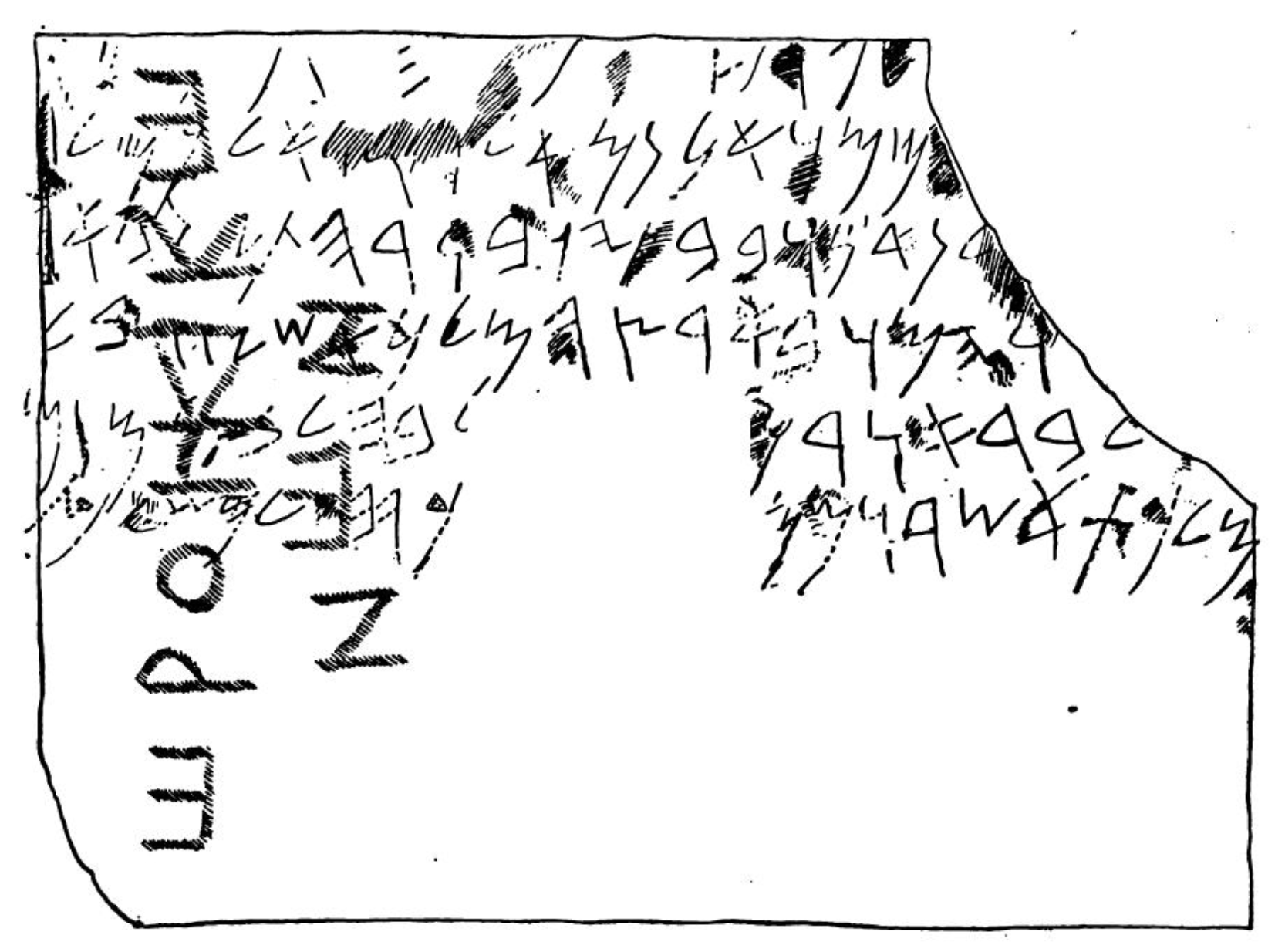
The inscription

The Hasanbeyli inscription is a Phoenician inscription on a basalt stone discovered in the village of Hasanbeyli, on the western slopes of the Amanus Mountains, in 1894.

It was discovered by Felix von Luschan, who had been excavating at nearby Zincirli.

The Phoenician inscription is 5 lines long, and mentions the "king of the city of Adana", the "king of Assur" and "Awariku" (also on the Karatepe inscription). A short Greek inscription with two crosses has been overlaid; it is thought that it was used as a boundary marker during Byzantine times.

It has been dated to the 8th century BC. The stele measures 42 x 34 x 23 cm. It is currently in the Vorderasiatisches Museum Berlin. The inscription is known as KAI 23.

== Bibliography ==
- Sachau, Baal-Harrän in einer Altaramäischen Inschrift auf einem Relief des Königlichen Museums zu Berlin
- Winckler, H. (1896). Eine phönicische inschrift aus Nordsyrien. Altorientalische Forschungen (in German). Eduard Pfeiffer. ISBN 978-0-7905-3058-1.
- Lemaire, A. "L'inscription phénicienne de Hassan-Beyli reconsidérée," Rivista di studi fenici 11: 9–19
