= Turkish Historical Society =

Historical society in Turkey

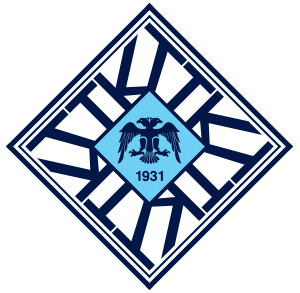
- Founder: Mustafa Kemal Atatürk
- Established: April 12, 1931; 95 years ago
- President: Ahmet Yaramış
- Location: Ankara, Turkey
- Website: www.ttk.gov.tr

The Turkish Historical Society (Turkish: Türk Tarih Kurumu; TTK) is a research society studying the history of Turkey and the Turkish people, founded in 1931 by the initiative of Mustafa Kemal Atatürk, with headquarters in Ankara, Turkey. It has been described as "the Kemalist official producer of nationalist historical narratives". Turkish sociologist Fatma Müge Göçek states that the TTK "failed to carry out independent research of Turkish history, remaining instead the voice of the official ideology".

== History ==
In 1930 the Committee for the study of Turkish History (Türk Tarihi Tetkik Heyeti) was established with the support of the Turkish Hearths. In 1931 the Association for the Study of Turkish History (Türk Tarihi Tetkik Cemiyeti) was founded, which in 1935 was renamed in Turkish Historical Society. in 1940, the Turkish Historical Society arose to an association working for the public interest. On 11 August 1983, it was elevated to a constitutionally protected institution under the Atatürk High Institution of Culture, Language and History (Atatürk Kültür, Dil ve Tarih Yüksek Kurumu, AKDTYK).

According to Turkish historian Doğan Gürpınar, by the 2000s the THA's "main function became the production and reproduction of the official line to counter Armenian allegations, in addition to publishing numerous monographs on Turkish history following a Rankean-cum-statist methodology and perspective."

== Publications ==
In 1930 the book Türk Tarihinin Ana Hatları (The Mainlines of Turkish History) which emphasized the ability of Turks was published under the auspices of the Committee for the study of Turkish history. This book, printed only 100 times, formed the basis for the Turkish History Thesis, which posited that Turks emigrated in several waves to China, India, Northern Africa and Europa to populate the areas and bringing the native people there civilization. In 1932 it released a four-volume history text for all secondary schools in Turkey upon request of the Ministry of Education. The text claimed that the ancient Turks have already had the ideas of nationality and the Turkish race.

The institute releases a regular bulletin called Belleten.

== Presidents ==
The institution's first president was Tevfik Bıyıklıoğlu.

In July 2008 its president Yusuf Halaçoğlu was dismissed. It was speculated that the decision reflected the government's desire for rapprochement with Armenia. Shortly before the decision, foreign minister Ali Babacan greeted Armen Martirosyan, Armenia's ambassador to the United Nations, in a reception related to Turkey's temporary accession the UN Security Council. Before that, president Serzh Sargsyan had invited his Turkish counterpart, Abdullah Gül, to a World Cup qualifying game between the two countries' national soccer teams.

In 2009, the president of the organization falsely claimed:

The research Yusuf Halaçoğlu conducted at the Ottoman, UN, US, German, French, British, and Russian archives has revealed that the Armenians murdered 532,000 Muslims whereas the number of Armenians who died during the deportations was around 47,000. Of these, 37,000 perished due to hunger, illness, and the strain of travel; 8,000 were killed by Arab, Kurdish, and Turkish bandits on the deportation routes, and 1,500 were unregistered deaths. In addition, 67 state officials were tried and executed for failing to protect the deported Armenians.

Göçek notes that Halaçoğlu does not speak all the languages in the archives that he purportedly consulted and many of the claims he made are not just false but actually impossible.

=== Presidents by the following years ===
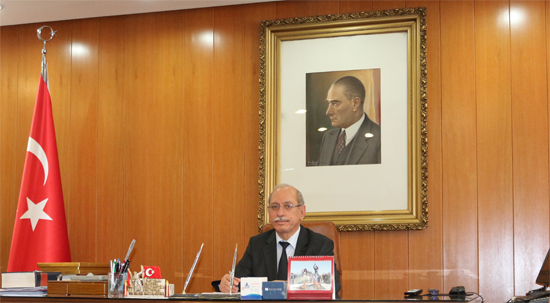
Prof. Dr. Refik Turan, former Chairman of the Turkish Historical Society (2015-2020)

- Tevfik Bıyıklıoğlu (1931-1932)
- Prof. Dr. Yusuf Akçura (1932-1935)
- Hasan Cemil Çambel (1935-1941)
- Ord. Prof. Dr. Şemsettin Günaltay (1941-1961)
- Ord. Prof. Dr. Şevket Aziz Kansu (1962-1973)
- Ord. Prof. Dr. Enver Ziya Karal (1973-1982)
- Ord. Prof. Dr. Sedat Alp (1982-1983)
- Prof. Dr. Yaşar Yücel (1983-1992)
- Prof. Dr. Neşet Çağatay (deputy) (1992-1993)
- Prof. Dr. İbrahim Agah Çubukçu (deputy) (1993)
- Prof. Dr. Yusuf Halaçoğlu (1993-2008)
- Prof. Dr. Ali Birinci (2008-2011)
- Prof. Dr. Bahaeddin Yediyıldız (deputy) (2011-2012)
- Prof. Dr. Mehmet Metin Hülagü (2012-2014)
- Prof. Dr. Mehmet Ali Beyhan (deputy) (2014-2015)
- Prof. Dr. Refik Turan (2015-2020)
- Prof. Dr. Ahmet Yaramış (2020-present)

== See also ==
- Turkish Language Association
