= Karatepe =

Historic site in Turkey

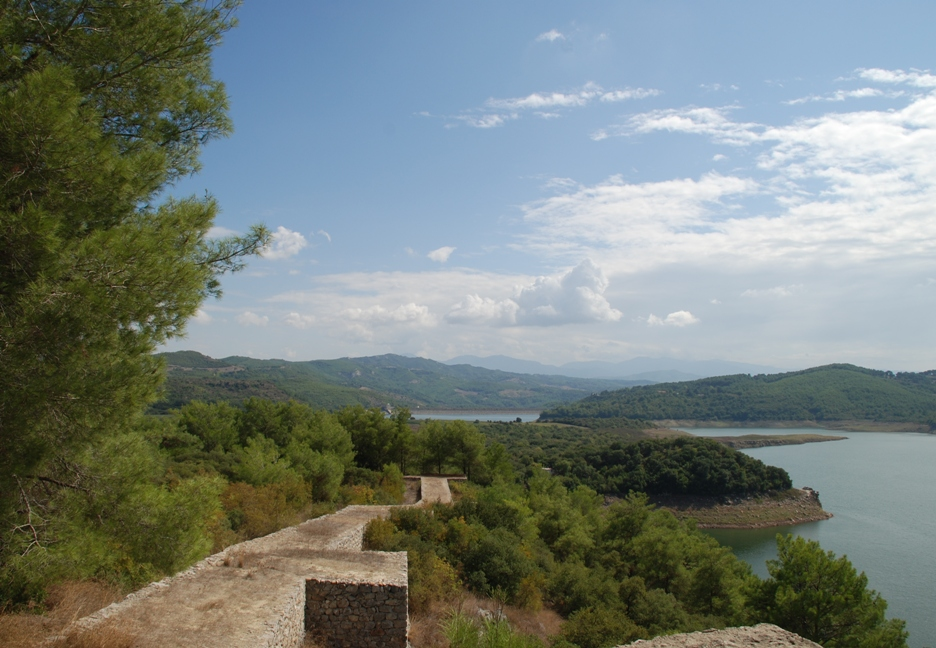

- Location within Turkey
- 37.29572521°N 36.25394787°E
- Type: Settlement
- Cultures: Neo-Hittite
- Location: Osmaniye Province, Turkey

Site notes
- Condition: In ruins

Karatepe (Turkish, 'Black Hill'; Hieroglyphic Luwian: 𔐔𔖪𔑣𔗬𔐬𔓱, romanized: Azzattiwadaya; Phoenician: 𐤀𐤆𐤕𐤅𐤃𐤉, romanized: ʾztwdy) is a Neo-Hittite fortress and open-air museum in Osmaniye Province in southern Turkey lying at a distance of about 23 km from the district center of Kadirli. It is sited in the Taurus Mountains, on the right bank of the Ceyhan River. The site is contained within Karatepe-Aslantaş National Park.

== History ==
=== Iron Age I ===
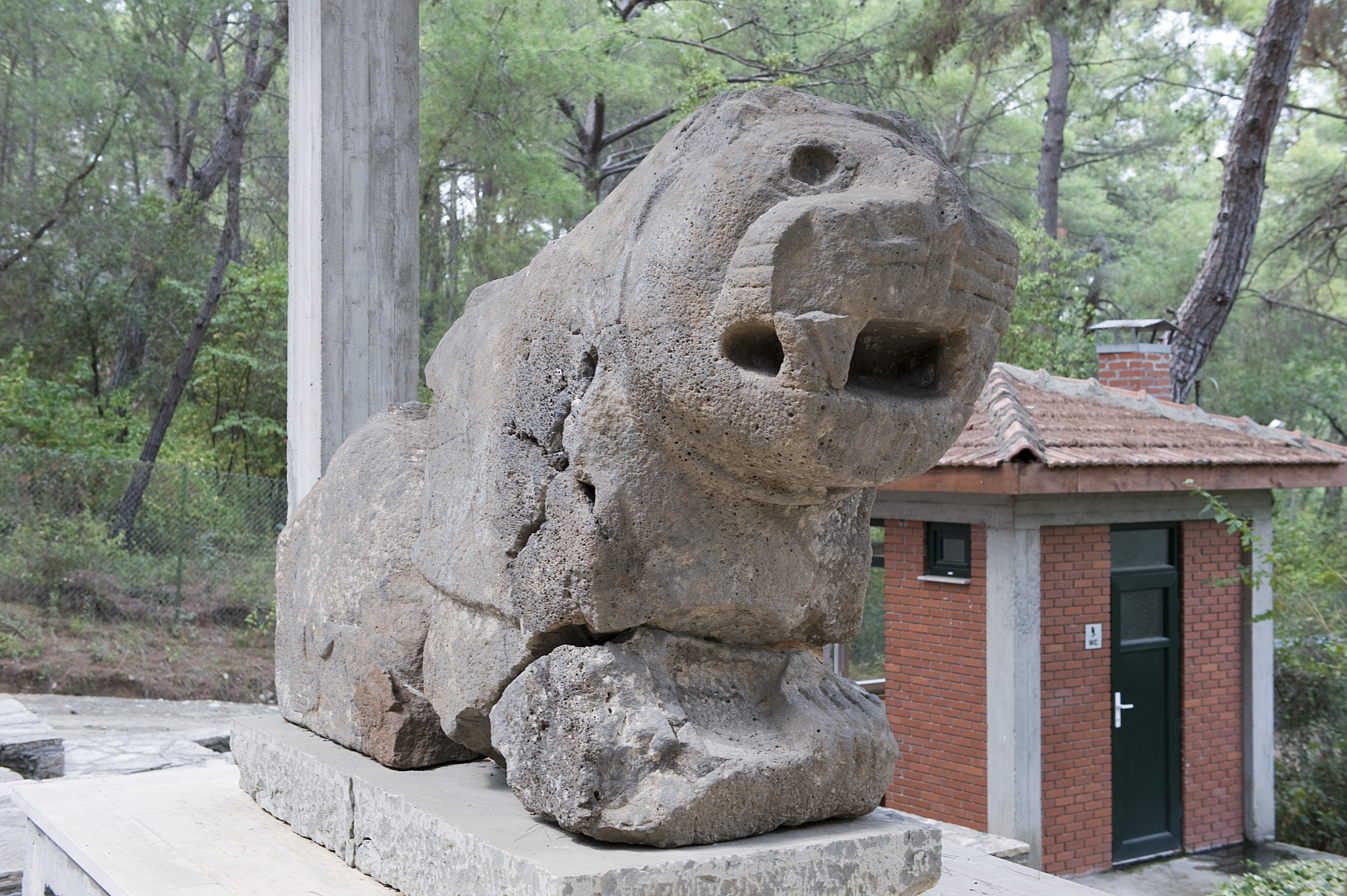
A Hittite lion statue at the Karatepe Museum

The place was an ancient city of Cilicia, which controlled a passage from eastern Anatolia to the north Syrian plain. It became an important Neo-Hittite center after the collapse of the Hittite Empire in the late 12th century BC. Relics found here include vast historic tablets, statues and ruins, even two monumental gates with reliefs on the sills depicting hunting and warring and a boat with oars; pillars of lions and sphinxes flank the gates.

=== Iron Age II ===
==== Karatepe inscription ====
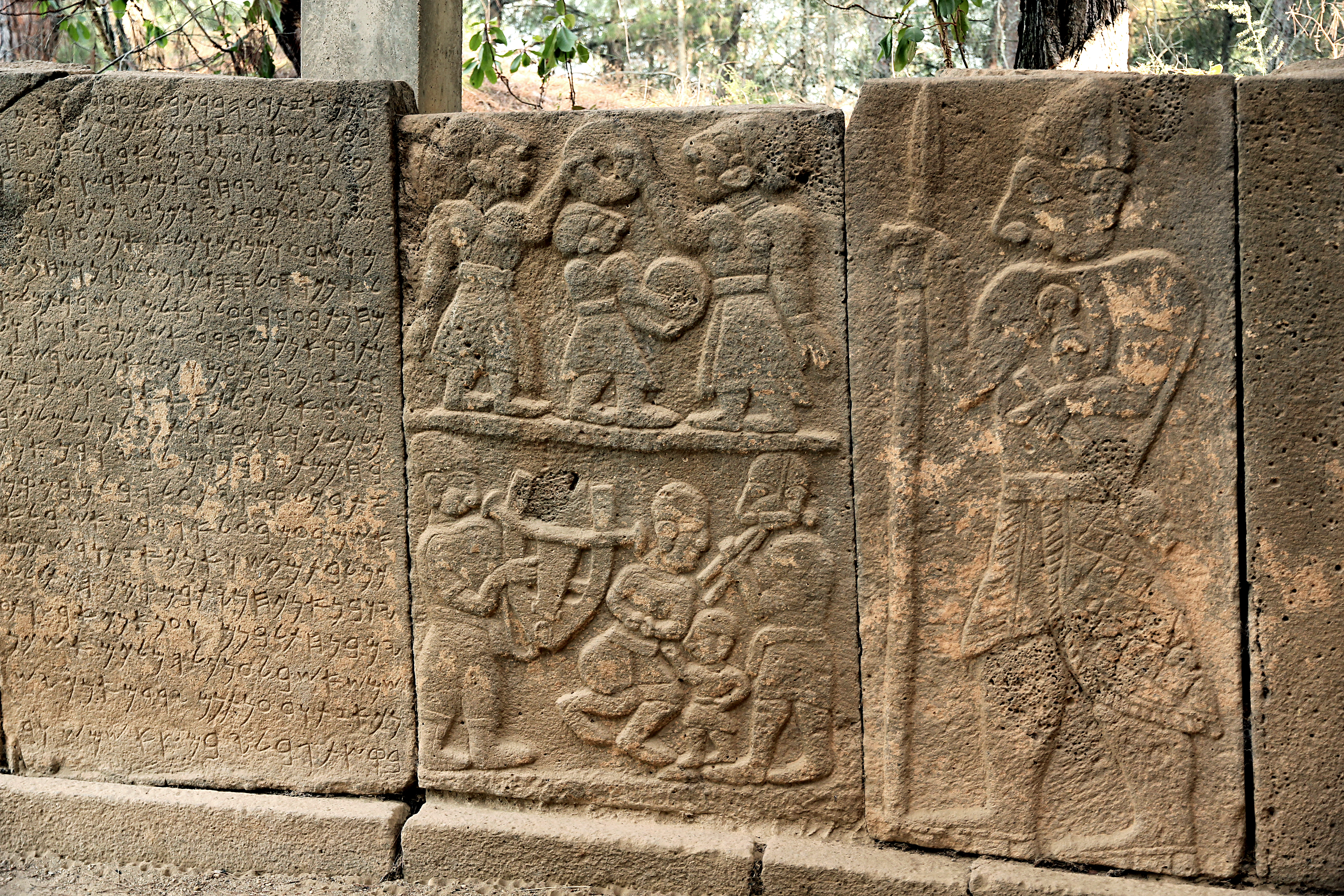
KaratepeNVl6-8

The site's eighth-century BC bilingual inscription, in Phoenician and Hieroglyphic Luwian, reflects the activities of the kings of Adana from the "house of Mopsos", given in Hieroglyphic Luwian as mu-ka-sa- (often rendered as 'Moxos') and in Phoenician as Mopsos in the form mpš. It was composed in Phoenician and then translated to Hieroglyphic Luwian. This inscription has served archaeologists as a Rosetta Stone for deciphering those glyphs.

As we learn from the inscription, its author is Azatiwada (or Azatiwata), the ruler of the town. He was also its founder; the inscription commemorates the town's foundation. He acknowledged himself as a subordinate of Awarikus, the king of Adanawa (Adana), which was the ancient kingdom of Ḫiyawa. Azatiwataya seems to have been one of the frontier towns of Adanawa.

Another inscription of the same type, the Cinekoy inscription, was discovered more recently. It also mentions king Awariku, who may have been the same ruler, or part of the same dynasty.

== Archaeology ==
The site was examined during the Oriental Institute of Chicago archaeological survey of the Amuq Valley in 1936. Karatepe was excavated from 1947 to 1957 by a team led by Helmuth Theodor Bossert (1889–1961), revealing the ruins of the walled city of king Azatiwataš. Restoration work was then carried on for many years, which included some further soundings. In the late 1990s, archaeological work, now led by Halet Çambel (1916–2014), was conducted on a palace at the site.

Estimates for the dating of Azatiwadas's rule have ranged from the early 8th century BC to the early 7th century BC.

The artifacts are exhibited today in the Karatepe-Aslantaş Open-Air Museum, which is part of Karatepe-Aslantaş National Park.

== Namesake ==
In the 2004 exploration of Mars, "Karatepe" was the name given to a site designated for entering the Endurance Crater to investigate the layering of the bedrock.

== Domuztepe (Aslantaş) ==
The archaeological site of Domuztepe (Aslantaş) is located on the eastern bank of Ceyhan river, across from Karatepe. It is the companion site of Domuztepe, and it was inhabited at the same time. It is dated to the ninth century BC. (Coordinates 37.291389, 36.256944)

This site is different from Domuztepe (Domuztepe Höyüğü (Kahramanmaraş)), the large mound of the Halaf period (fifth millennium BC) that is situated near Kahramanmaraş. Kahramanmaras is also located on the Ceyhan river; it is about 70km upstream from Karatepe and Domuztepe.

After the construction of Aslantaş Dam, the site was substantially flooded.

Unlike Karatepe, which was founded in the Iron Age period, Domuztepe (Aslantaş) has a long sequence of occupation beginning with the Neolithic period (8th Millennium BC). Domuztepe is located on a natural hill. It was partly excavated in the early 1980s, before the lower parts of the site became mostly submerged by the dam lake. A fortified city of the Hittite empire period flourished there.

In 1947, Th. Bossert and B. Alkım reported finding a statue base with two bulls at the site. It carries a poorly preserved hieroglyphic Luwian inscription. The find is currently at the Karatepe Museum.

In 1982, a Storm God stele was discovered at the site by Halet Çambel. Also several portal lions were found. The site is believed to be a little earlier than Karatepe.

Some villas of Roman period have also been discovered. In 1958, this currently forested area was designated as a Historic National Park.

== See also ==
- Ḫiyawa
- Cities of the ancient Near East
- Short chronology timeline
