= Halet Çambel =

Turkish archaeologist and fencer (1916–2014)

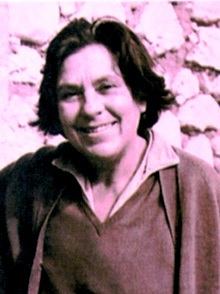
- Born: 27 August 1915; Berlin, German Empire
- Died: 12 January 2014 (aged 98); Istanbul, Turkey
- Resting place: Akyaka, Muğla, Turkey
- Education: American College for Girls; Sorbonne University; University of Istanbul
- Occupation: Archaeologist
- Spouse: Nail Çakırhan
- Awards: Prince Claus Award

Halet Çambel (27 August 1915 – 12 January 2014) was a Turkish archaeologist and Olympic fencer. She was the first woman with a Muslim background to compete in the Olympic Games.

== Biography ==
Çambel was born in Berlin, German Empire on 27 August 1916, to Turkish military attaché Hasan Cemil Bey (Çambel), a close associate of Mustafa Kemal Atatürk, founder of the Turkish Republic, and Remziye Hanım. Her maternal grandfather was Ibrahim Hakki Pasha, a former Grand Vizier (prime minister of the Ottoman sultan) and the Ottoman ambassador to the German Empire at the time.

Çambel took up fencing as a child, inspired by knights in children's stories. In the 1920s, her family returned to Istanbul, and she completed her secondary education at Arnavutköy American High School for Girls (today Robert College). During her high school years, she was inspired by her history of art teacher, who organized visits to historic sites of Istanbul. Çambel studied archaeology at Sorbonne University in Paris, France and at Istanbul University, where she subsequently worked for many years.

On returning to Istanbul after the 1936 Summer Olympics, where she represented her country, she started a relationship with Nail Çakırhan, a communist poet and journalist, who became a celebrated architect. They were married for seventy years until the death of Nail Çakırhan in October 2008.

Çambel died at age 97 in Istanbul on 12 January 2014. Following a memorial ceremony held at Istanbul University's Faculty of Letters, she was taken to Akyaka, Muğla, where she was interred beside her spouse's grave.

== Fencing career ==
Çambel competed in the women's individual foil event at the 1936 Summer Olympics, at which she lost all five of her bouts. Çambel was the first Muslim woman to compete in the Olympics. Although invited by a female German official to meet Adolf Hitler, Çambel and her teammate Suat Aşani refused it on political grounds.

== Archaeological career ==
Çambel studied Archaeology at Sorbonne University in Paris, France, in the 1930s until the outbreak of World War II compelled her to return to Turkey without completing her doctorate. In Istanbul, Çambel began studying with German archaeologist Helmuth Theodor Bossert (1889–1961), who was professor of archaeology at Istanbul University. In 1944, she received her doctorate for a thesis on the Bronze Age-Iron Age site Hashöyük. From 1947 on, Çambel served as lecturer. She was a visiting scholar for two years at University of Saarbrücken in Germany. In 1960, she was appointed Professor of Prehistoric Archaeology and founded the Institute of Prehistory. She became emeritus in 1984.

In 1947, Bossert and Çambel began excavating Karatepe, the walled city of 12th century BC late Hittite king Azatiwada, located at the Taurus Mountains in southern Turkey. The discovery of the Karatepe Bilingual, a monumental inscription with text in both Anatolian hieroglyphs and the Phoenician alphabet was key to the decipherment of the Hittite-Luwian Hieroglyphic script. Çambel continued to work at Karatepe-Aslantaş for the rest of her career. In 1999, she published the inscriptions from Karatepe-Aslantaş as part of the series Corpus of Hieroglyphic Luwian Inscriptions.

Çambel was also active in promoting the preservation of Turkey's cultural heritage. In the 1950s, she resisted the government's attempt to move the artifacts from Karatepe to a museum. The government eventually agreed, and in 1960 established an outdoor museum, the Karatepe-Aslantaş Open-Air Museum, where her husband Nail Çakırhan designed some buildings. She also fought efforts to dam the Ceyhan River, which would have flooded many archaeological sites. She was able to have the proposed water level reduced sufficiently to save the sites.

== Recognition and awards ==
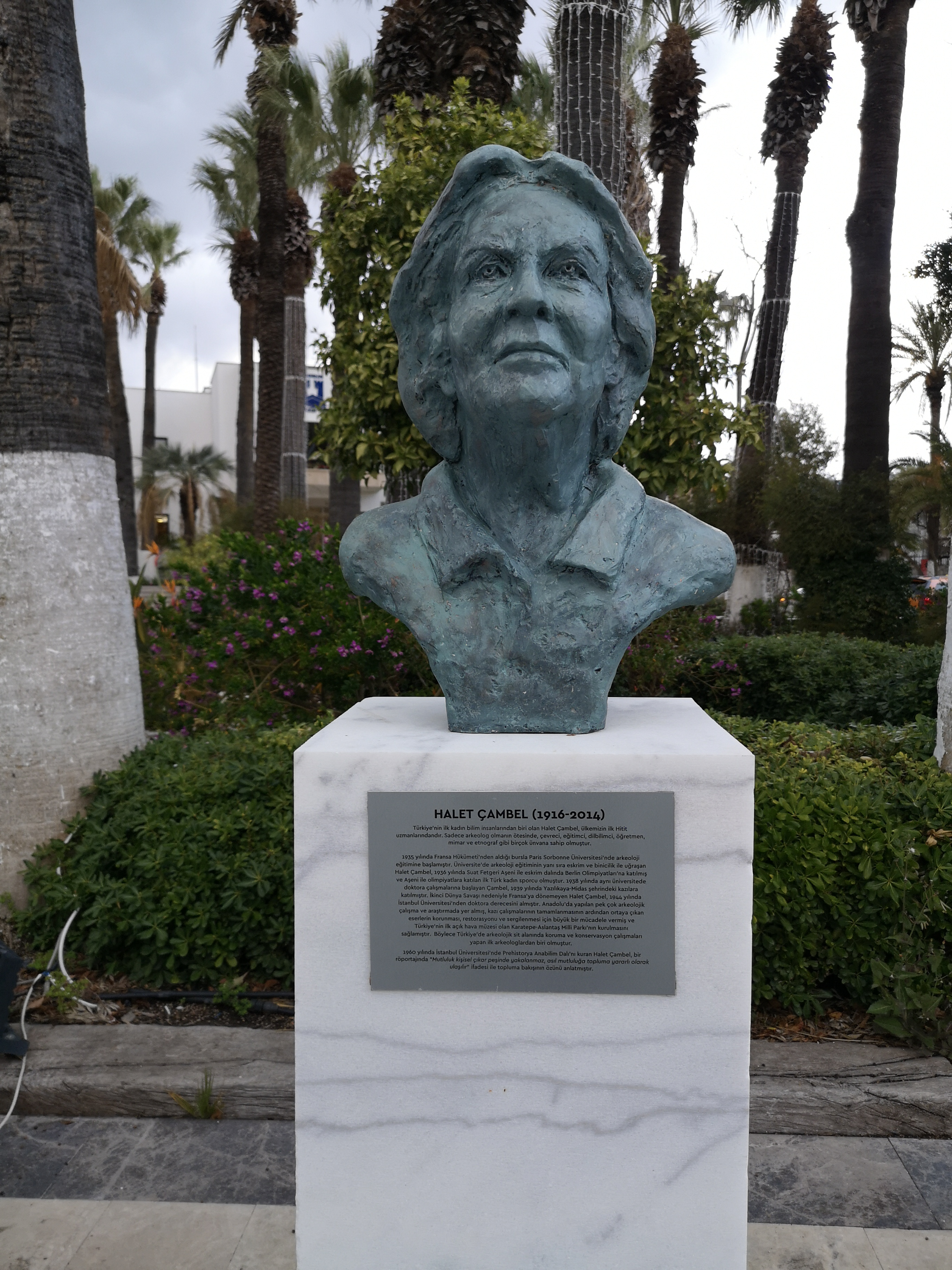
Statue of Çambel in Bodrum

Çambel was elected to the American Philosophical Society in 1979. In 2004, she received the Prince Claus Award in the Netherlands. The jury report cited her "for conducting rescue excavations of endangered heritage sites, introducing stone restoration and ensuring proper conservation of significant cultural heritage in Turkey", for founding a chair of Prehistoric archaeology at Istanbul University, and "for her dedicated scholarship and for her unique role in expanding the possibilities for interaction between people and their cultural heritage."

In 2015, a Google Doodle celebrated Çambel's 99th birthday.

Çambel was celebrated in an exhibition Cumhuriyet Kadınları Sahneye Çıkıyor: Cevval, Akılcı, Dirençli, Sabırlı ve İnançlı, (Republican Women Take to the Stage: Brave, Rational, Resistant, Patient and Faithful) organised at Goethe-Institut Ankara from 5 December 2023 to 4 February 2024 in honour of the 100th anniversary of the founding of the Republic of Turkey and the 90th anniversary of Turkish women gaining the right to vote. It showcased the lives and careers of six women who were educated in the young Turkish Republic and the Weimar Republic and whose careers made an impact on the world. Alongside Çambel, the exhibition featured computer scientist Marianne Laqueur, architect Mualla Eyüboğlu Anhegger, Semiha Berksoy, Turkey's first Muslim opera singer, paediatrician Erna Eckstein Schlossmann and architect Margarete Schütte-Lihotzky.
