= Enver Ziya Karal =

Turkish academic

- Born: 1906; Kosovo, Ottoman Empire
- Died: 18 January 1982 (aged 78–79); Ankara, Turkey
- Education: University of Paris
- Known for: Rector of Ankara University; President of the Turkish Historical Society
- Scientific career
- Fields: Historian
- Workplaces: Istanbul University; Ankara University

Enver Ziya Karal (1906–1982) was a historian, academic and university administrator in Turkey.

== Early life ==
He was born in Kosovo, then a part of the Ottoman Empire. During the Balkan Wars (1912–1913) in which his father and other relatives were killed, he came to Istanbul to study in the Ortaköy Orphans' School. Later, he continued his education at Edirne High School. He graduated in 1928, and he travelled to France by the government scholarship. In France, he studied in Lycée du Parc in Lyon and University of Paris.

== Career ==
In 1933, he returned to Istanbul and was appointed as a history associate professor in the School of letters of Istanbul University. In 1942, he came to Ankara as a professor to serve in the School of Language and History – Geography (Turkish: Dil ve Tarih-Coğrafya Fakültesi). Between 30 April 1948 and 22 June 1949, he was elected as the rector of Ankara University. In 1960, he gained the title distinguished professor. He also lectured in the Columbia University in the United States and the University of Manchester in the United Kingdom as a visiting professor.

== Other posts and duties ==
In 1953, he was tasked with the restoration project of Atatürk's birthplace in Thessaloniki, Greece. During the Constituent Assembly of Turkey in 1960–1961 term, he was elected as the speaker of the committee which was responsible for the new constitution. In 1971, he served in European Commission in behalf of Turkey. Between he 1972–1982, he was the president of Turkish Historical Society. He died on 18 January 1982 in Ankara.

== Personal life ==
His daughter, Seçil Karal Akgün, is a retired academic in the Department of History at Middle East Technical University.
