= Şevket Aziz Kansu =

Turkish physician and academic

- Born: 1903; Edirne, Ottoman Empire
- Died: 10 April 1983 (aged 79–80); Ankara, Turkey
- Education: Istanbul University; University of Sorbonne
- Known for: President of Ankara University
- Scientific career
- Fields: Physician, anthropologist
- Workplaces: Istanbul, Ankara,

Şevket Aziz Kansu (1903, Edirne–1983, Ankara) was a Turkish physician and academic. He specialised in anthropology and archaeology and was the first rector of Ankara University.

== Education and academic career ==
Kansu was born in Edirne. He studied medicine at Istanbul University, graduating in 1923. In 1927, after completing compulsory government service and working as a medical doctor for two years in Bala, Ankara, he went to Paris to study anthropology. He received a diploma in anthropological sciences from the Sorbonne in 1929.

Returning to Turkey, Kansu worked both as a physician and an associate professor of anthropology at Istanbul University. He was appointed a full professor in 1934. In 1935 he moved from Istanbul to Ankara at the request of Atatürk, taking up a position at the newly established School of Language and History - Geography (Turkish: Dil ve Tarih Coğrafya Fakültesi). He served as the dean of that institution between 1942 and 1944, and when Ankara University was established in 1946, Kansu was elected as its first rector. He held this position between 22 June 1946 and 26 April 1948.

== Other posts ==
Although primarily a physician, Kansu was active in other areas of interest, such as archaeology. He took part in excavations in Etiyokuşu, Tuzla, and Yarımburgaz.

He was a member of the Turkish Academy of Medicine, the Turkish Language Association, the Society of Anthropology of Paris, the Society of Anthropology of Rome, the German Archaeological Institute, the Florence Society of Anthropology and the Turkish Society of Cancerology. Between 1962 and 1973, he was the president of Turkish Historical Society.

Kansu died on 10 April 1983, in Ankara.
