= Aslantaş Dam =

Aslantaş Dam Aslantaş Barajı
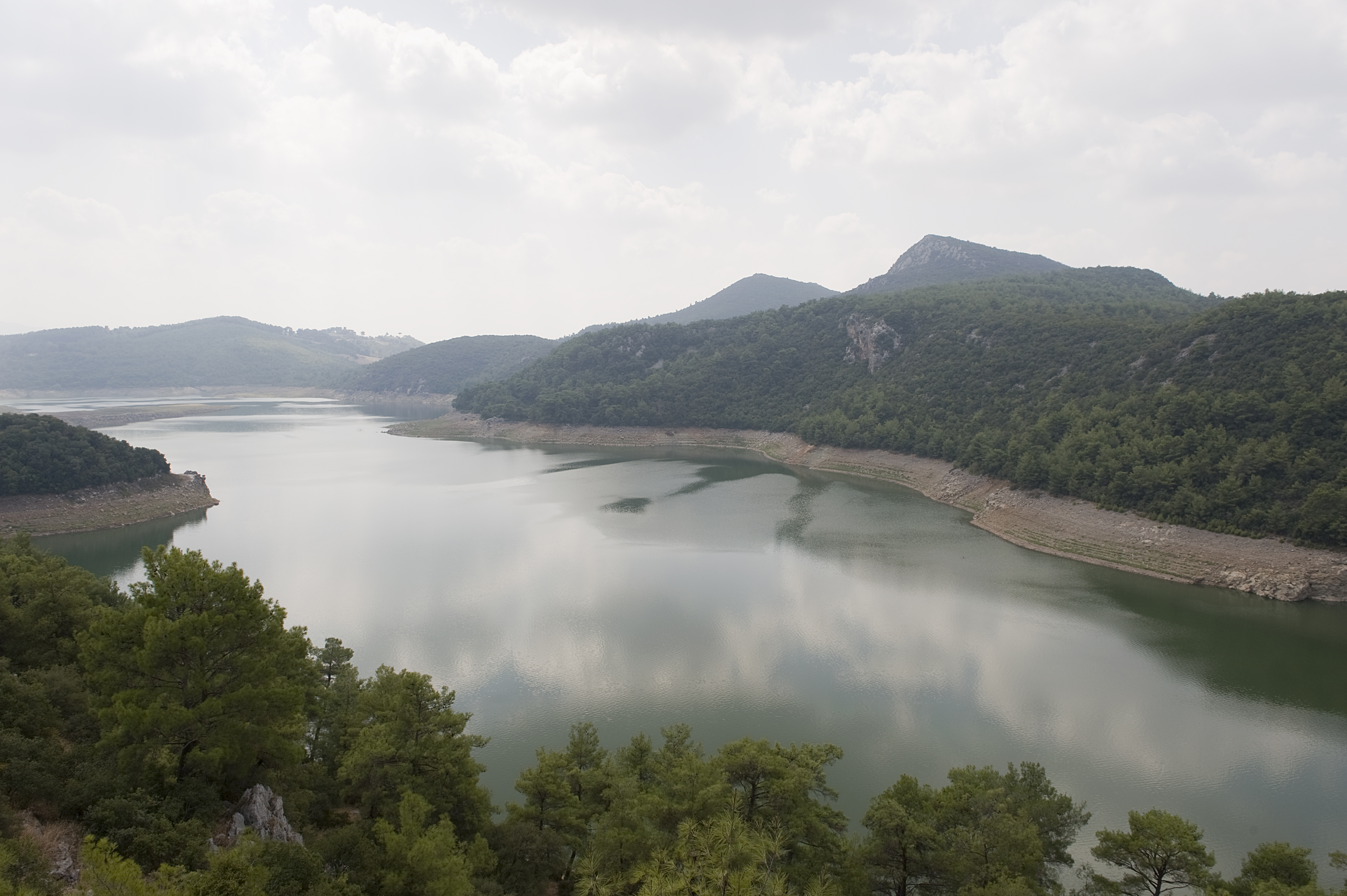
- reservoir

- Location of Aslantaş Dam in Turkey
- Official name: Aslantaş Barajı
- Location: Osmaniye Province, Turkey
- Coordinates: 37°16′21″N 36°16′17″E
- Construction began: 1975
- Opening date: 1984
- Owner: State Hydraulic Works (DSI)

Dam and spillways
- Type of dam: Rock-filled
- Impounds: Ceyhan River
- Height: 95 m (312 ft)
- Dam volume: 8.493 hm^{3} (11,108,425 cu yd)

Reservoir
- Total capacity: 1,150 hm^{3} (4.1×10^{10} cu ft)
- Surface area: 49 km^{2} (19 mi^{2})

Power Station
- Installed capacity: 138 MW
- Annual generation: 569 GWh

Aslantaş Dam (Turkish: Aslantaş Barajı) is an embankment dam on the Ceyhan River in Osmaniye Province, southern Turkey, built between 1975 and 1984.

Aslantaş Dam is situated 80 km (50 mi) northeast of Adana. Built for irrigation, flood control and electricity generation purposes by the State Hydraulic Works (DSI), the dam is 95 m (312 ft) high and has a volume of 8.493 hm^{3} (11,108,425 cu yd) filled with rock. The dam creates a 49 km^{2} (19 mi^{2}) wide lake with 1,150 hm^{3} (4.1×10^{10} cu ft) capacity at normal water level. It irrigates an area of 149,849 ha (370,280 acres). It also supports a 138 MW power station, which generates 569 GWh electricity annually. According to some sources, the construction of the Aslantaş Dam resulted in involuntary resettlement of 60,000 people.

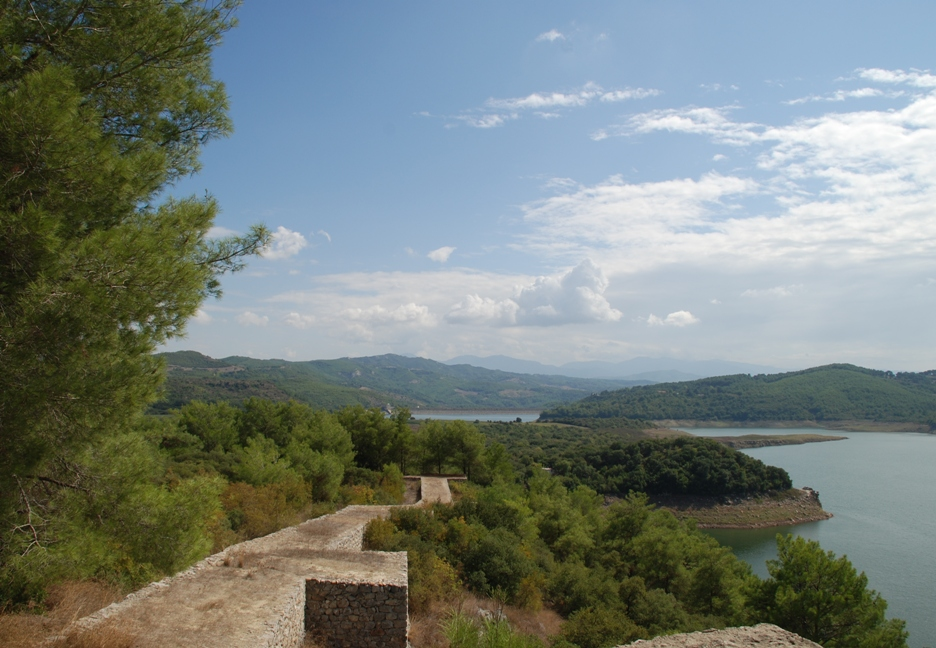
Aslantaş Dam reservoir (right) seen from Karatepe with the fortification wall (left) at the Karatepe-Aslantaş Open-Air Museum.

Partly on the western and eastern banks of the dam reservoir, the Karatepe-Aslantaş National Park is located. On a peninsula at the west bank, the hill Karatepe is situated inside the national park. Overlooking the dam reservoir, a walled settlement of the Neo-Hittites was discovered on Karatepe dating back to the 8th century BC. Following archaeological excavations between 1946 and 1952, the site was preserved as the Karatepe-Aslantaş Open-Air Museum in 1958. The Kumkale on Domuztepe, another settlement of the Neo-Hittites and a fortification built by the Crusaders, which is located about 2 km (1.2 mi) north of this site, was flooded by the dam reservoir.

== See also ==
- List of dams and reservoirs in Turkey
