= Hasan Cemil Çambel =

Turkish politician (1879–1967)

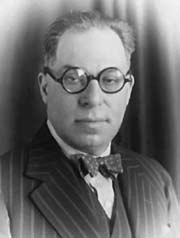

Member of the Grand National Assembly

Personal details
- Born: 1879 Çanakkale, Ottoman Empire
- Died: 1967 (aged 87–88) Istanbul, Turkey

Hasan Cemil Çambel (1879–1967) was a Turkish politician and historian, who was a founding member of the Turkish Historical Association, which he also served as its president. He was a close friend of Mustafa Kemal Atatürk and the father of Halet Çambel.
