= Karatepe-Aslantaş National Park =

National park in Osmaniye, Turkey

- Karatepe-Aslantaş Milli Parkı
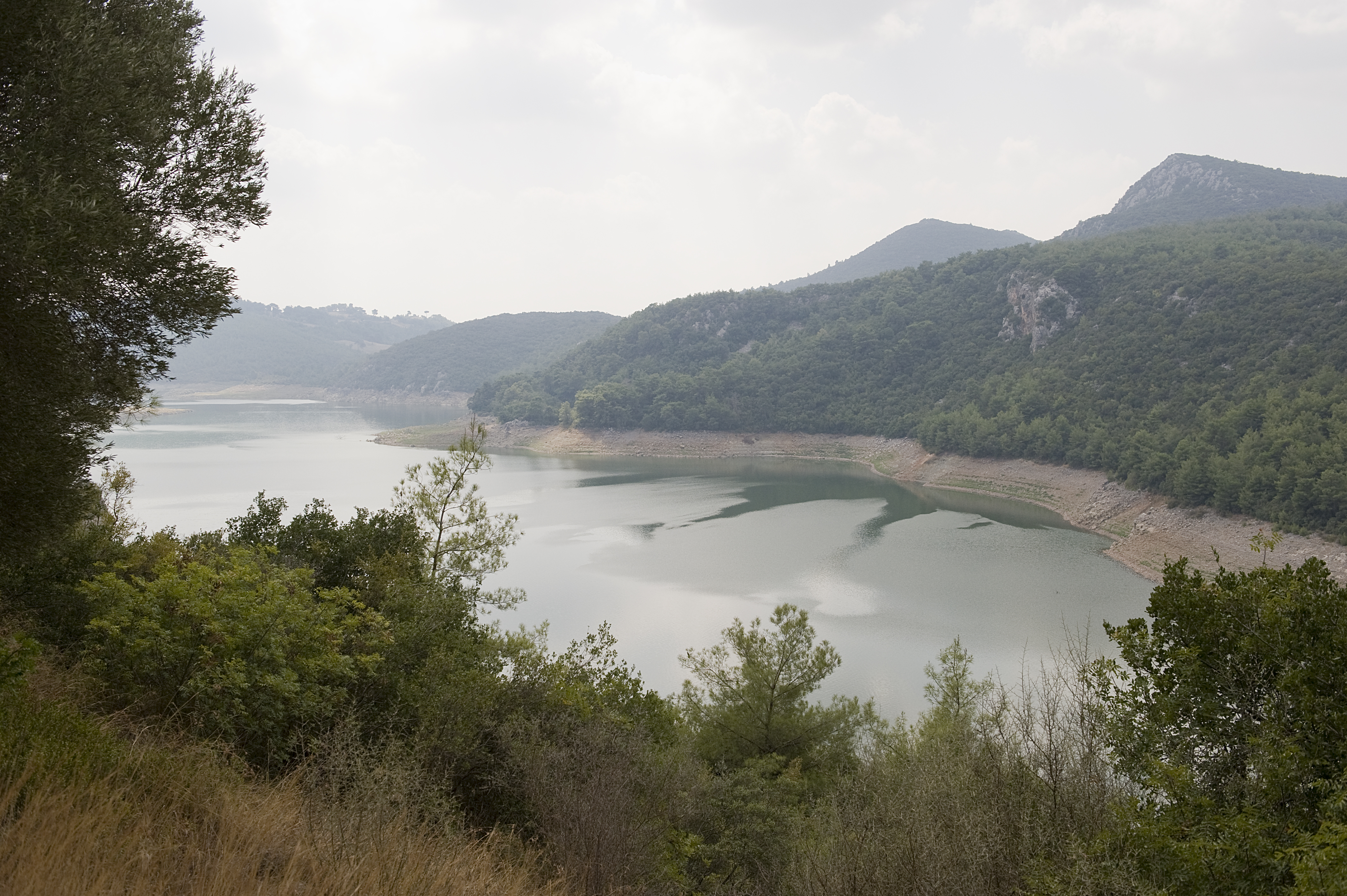
- A view of the national park seen from Karatepe. Ancient fortification wall at the open-air museum (left) and Aslantaş Dam reservoir (right).

- Location within Turkey
- Location: Kadirli-Düziçi, Osmaniye Province, Turkey
- Coordinates: 37°18′29.04″N 36°15′01.10″E
- Area: 4,145 ha (10,240 acres)
- Established: May 29, 1958
- Governing body: Ministry of Forest and Water Management
- Website: www.milliparklar.gov.tr/mp/karatepeaslantas/index.htm

Karatepe-Aslantaş National Park (Turkish: Karatepe-Aslantaş Milli Parkı), established in 1958, is a national park in southern Turkey. Situated on the banks of a dam reservoir, it contains an archaeological open-air museum.

== Location ==
Karatepe-Aslantaş National Park is located in the Kadirli and Düziçi districts of Osmaniye Province. The provincial roads P.80-75, P.80-76 and P.80-77 from Osmaniye to Kadirlı pass through the national park. The protected area is located at 30 km (19 mi) from north of Osmaniye and 22 km (14 mi) southeast of Kadirli. The nearest airport is Adana Şakirpaşa Airport at 125 km (78 mi) distance form the national park.

== Background ==
The national park was established on September 28, 1958 as the country's second protected area of this type after the discovery and excavations of important archaeological finds here.

== Geography ==
The national park is located on a slightly rugged terrain between the foothills of Taurus Mountains and the plains of Çukurova, where Ceyhan River runs through. The national park is partly on the banks of a reservoir formed by the Aslantaş Dam. The streams Hillik Creek, Kırağı Creek, Kışla Creek and Kaplan Creek, which are all tributes of the Ceyhan River and flow into the Aslantaş Dam reservoir, are at the boundaries of the protected area.

Elevation of the national park area varies from 65 to 538 m (213 to 1,765 ft), including notable hills as İncirlitepe: 377 m (1,237 ft), Kalitepe: 345 m (1,132 ft), Karadağtepe: 492 m (1,614 ft), Garzedetepe: 479 m (1,572 ft), Gavurtaştepe: 401 m (1,316 ft), Bocayücetepe: 338 m (1,109 ft), and Karatepe being the highest one at 538 m (1,765 ft).

== Open-air museum ==
The national park comprises Turkey's first established open-air museum as its centerpiece with the same name. It is situated atop Karatepe, on a peninsula of the Aslantaş Dam reservoir. The site, called locally "Hitit Yarımadası" ("Hittite Peninsula"), is reached by a 1,200 m (3,900 ft)-long stone-paved trail from the entrance of the national park.

The open-air museum is an archaeological site, an ancient walled settlement of the Neo-Hittites dating back to the 8th century. Excavated between 1946 and 1952, the artifacts, stone statues and reliefs inside the ruined fortification, are left at their original place. Lion statues on stone (Turkish: Aslantaş) give the site its name. The Karatepe Bilingual, inscriptions on stone with the same text in Phoenician alphabet and Hieroglyphic Luwian, which enabled the decryption of the Anatolian hieroglyphs, is the most interesting piece of the open-air museum.

== Ecosystem ==
Flora

The national park inhabits many typical flora species of the Mediterranean climate. Turkish pine (Pinus brutia) and oak (Quercus) form woodlands, and (Quercus) shrub groves in the national park. Other plants are turpentine tree (Pistacia terebinthus) and sumac (Rhus). Picnic areas of the national park were planted with umbrella pine (Pinus pinea), walnut tree (Juglans), plane tree (Platanus), mulberry tree (Morus), melissa and hortensia (Hydrangea).

Fauna

15 mammal, 12 reptile, 5 amphibian and 22 fish species are observed in the national park

== Recreation ==
The national park is open to visitors on daily basis. Opportunities offered as recreational outdoor activities are hiking, picnicking and camping. Camping is permitted at designated picnic locations only. Accommodation is available in Kadirli and Osmaniye.
