= Tevfik Bıyıklıoğlu =

Turkish politician

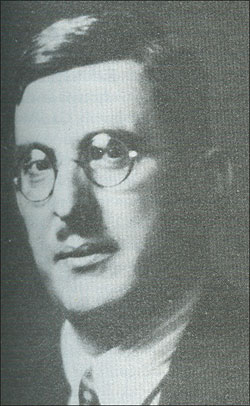

Member of the Grand National Assembly

Personal details
- Born: 1891 Çanakkale, Ottoman Empire
- Died: 24 November 1961 (aged 69–70) Istanbul, Turkey
- Party: CHP

Tevfik Bıyıklıoğlu (1891 – 24 November 1961) was a Turkish politician, who was a founding member of the Turkish Historical Association, which he served as its first president.

== Biography ==
He was born in Çanakkale in 1891. He entered the Military Academy in 1905 and graduated in 1908 as an artillery officer and valedictorian of his class, and in 1914 he graduated from the Military Academy as valedictorian of his class.

In 1915, he was promoted to the rank of Staff and took part in the Dardanelles campaign during the First World War. in 1923, while he was a Staff Lieutenant Colonel in the First Branch of the General Staff, he was appointed as Deputy Chief Clerk on March 18, 1924. On May 1, 1924, he was appointed as the General Clerk of the Presidency of the Republic of Turkey in his capacity as Military Chief Clerk.
