= Domuztepe =

Archaeological site in Turkey

- Domuztepe Höyüğü (Kahramanmaraş)
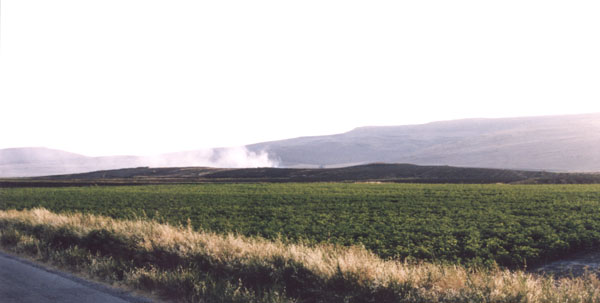
- A view of Domuztepe from the north east

- Location within Turkey
- 37°19′15.53″N 37°2′8.45″E
- Cultures: Halaf culture
- Location: Turkey

Site notes
- Area: 20 ha (49 acres)

Domuztepe (meaning Pig Hill in Turkish) was a large, Late Neolithic settlement in south east Turkey, occupied at least as early as c.6,200BC and abandoned c.5,450BC. The site is located to the south of Kahramanmaraş. Covering 20 hectares, it is primarily a Halaf site of the 6th millennium BC and is the largest known settlement of that date.

The site was investigated between 1995 and 2006 by a team from the University of Manchester and the University of California, Los Angeles. Work resumed in 2008, since when the excavation has been a joint project between the University of Manchester and the British Museum.

== History of occupation ==
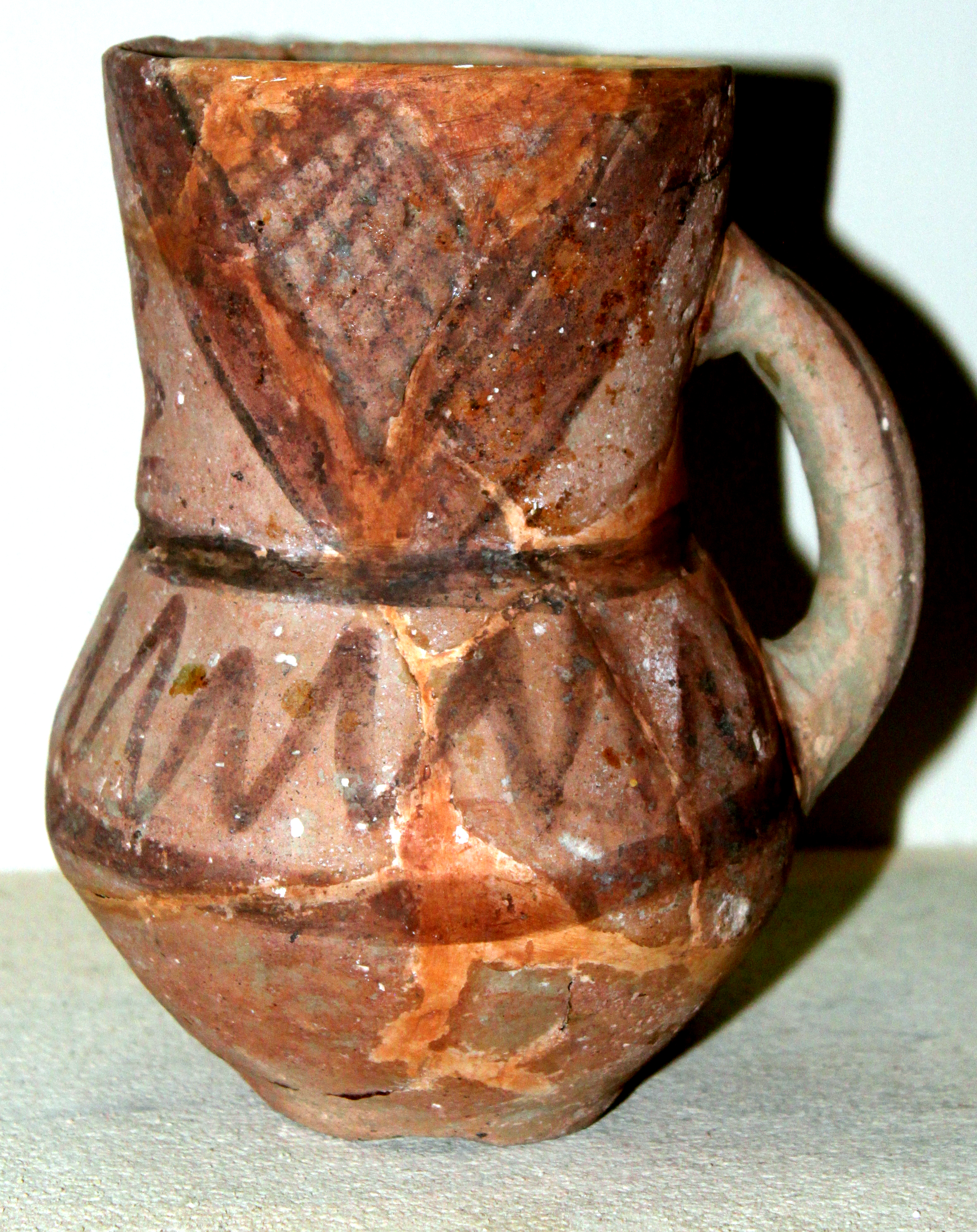
Halaf style ceramic pot from Kultepe, Azerbaijan, c. 6000 BC

The site was certainly founded by the Ceramic Neolithic (c.6400BC) but may have been occupied earlier. By the late Halaf almost all of the 20 hectare area of the site was probably occupied. Prehistoric occupation ended towards the end of the Halaf period (c.5450 BC). The site was reoccupied during the Hellenistic period and was occupied by a significant settlement during the first millennium AD. There is evidence for a church at this time, and a small Christian cemetery has been excavated.

The excavated part of the prehistoric sequence starts at the transition between the Ceramic Neolithic and the Early Halaf (c.6100 BC) and continues until c.5450 BC. The Halaf occupation has been traced in a series of trenches across the site, providing rich evidence for both circular and rectangular buildings, ceramics, stone bowls, beads, figurines, chipped stone, bone tools and stamp seals, as well as a rich assemblage of animal bones and botanical remains.

Excavation has concentrated on Operation I, on the summit of the southern mound. In the Early Halaf an east-west terrace was built up from red clay, with a series of occupational deposits to the south, and maintained in subsequent phases.

== The Death Pit ==
Between 1997 and 2003 a highly complex burial was excavated, called the ‘Death Pit’. This pit was more than 3m in diameter and about 1.5m deep, filled with layers of dis-articulated human and animal bones, broken pottery and other artifacts. The ceremonies that produce this feature probably took place over a few weeks and had several phases.

The earliest layer of the Death Pit mainly contained animal bones, apparently from large-scale feasting. Later deposits included the remains of up to 40 people. The bodies had been heavily fragmented and cannibalism may have taken place. After the Death Pit was filled, it was covered in a thick layer of ash and marked with large posts. Further deposits of human remains were placed around its edges.

== Obsidian trade ==
Recent research identified some Armenian obsidian at Domuztepe. Electron microprobe analysis and portable X-ray fluorescence were used. 15 artifacts from Domuztepe match de:Pokr Arteni, a common obsidian source in Armenia. Thus, the Late Neolithic settlement of Domuztepe traded over a walking distance of 800 km. Four other obsidian sources from the Kura-Araxes basin were also identified at Domuztepe.

== See also ==
- Prehistory of Anatolia
- Hacilar
