= Group D =

Group D may refer to:

- FIA Group D - International Formula racing cars:
  - Formula Two
  - Formula Three
  - Formula 3000
- One of six or eight groups of four teams competing at the FIFA World Cup
  - 2026 FIFA World Cup Group D
  - 2022 FIFA World Cup Group D
  - 2018 FIFA World Cup Group D
  - 2014 FIFA World Cup Group D
  - 2010 FIFA World Cup Group D
  - 2006 FIFA World Cup Group D
  - 2002 FIFA World Cup Group D
  - 1998 FIFA World Cup Group D
  - 1994 FIFA World Cup Group D
  - 1990 FIFA World Cup Group D
- Group D Production Sports Cars, a motor racing category current in Australia from 1972 to 1981
- D Grubu, Turkish artists group founded in 1933 by Zeki Faik İzer, Nurullah Berk, Elif Naci, Cemal Tollu, Abidin Dino and Zühtü Müridoğlu.
