= Adalet =

Adalet is a Turkish word, and it may refer to:

== Given name ==
- Adalet Ağaoğlu (1929–2020), Turkish female novelist and playwright
- Adalet Cimcoz (1910–1970), Turkish art curator, voice actress, critic and translator
- Adalet Shukurov (born 1966), Azerbaijani pop singer

== Other uses ==
- Justice Party (Turkey) (1961–1981), a defunct Turkish political party
- Justice and Development Party (Turkey) (founded 2001), a Turkish political party

== See also ==
- Adalat (disambiguation)
