= Adalet Cimcoz =

Turkish voice actress, art curator, critic, translator and columnist

- Born: Adalet Tayfur; 25 July 1910; Kilitbahir, Eceabat, Çanakkale, Ottoman Empire
- Died: 13 March 1970 (aged 59); Istanbul, Turkey
- Resting place: zincirlikuyu Cemetery
- Occupations: Voice actress, art curator, critic, translator, gossip columnist
- Spouse: Mehmet Ali Cimcoz (m. 1939)

Adalet Cimcoz (25 July 1910 – 13 March 1970) was a Turkish voice actress, art curator, critic, translator and gossip columnist. Her 30-year career as a voice actress included dubbing numerous film stars. She also opened and curated Turkey's first and only woman-owned private art gallery for exhibitions of painting, sculpture, mosaic, ceramics, photography, patterns, and folk art. She critiqued literature, art, and theatre for twenty years. She translated a number of classical works of European literature from German to Turkish. She was also a gossip columnist under the pen name "Fitne Fücur" ("The Mischief-maker)".

== Private life ==
Adalet was born to Hüseyin Tayfur and his wife Aliye in Kilitbahir village of Eceabat district in Çanakkale Province, then Ottoman Empire, on 25 July 1910. Her father was an artillery Colonel of the Ottoman Army stationed at the Dardanelles as the commander. of Kilitbahir Castle. Her mother was a German, whom her father met during an official military mission in the German Empire. She converted to Islam from Christianity after her marriage, and took the name Aliye. Adalet had two older brothers Hayri and Ferdii. Ferdi Tayfur would be also a voice actor.

In 1916, Adalet went to Germany with her family. She finished her primary education in 1921, and then completed her secondary education in Germany.

In 1939, she married Mehmet Ali Cimcoz. Thanks to her husband, who was a lawyer and had a social circle of friends in arts and politics, she met and became associated with notable people in arts and literature, among them Sabahattin Ali, Nâzım Hikmet, Cemal Tollu, Bedri Rahmi Eyüboğlu, Ercüment Kalmık, Avni Arbaş, Kuzgun Acar, Ara Güler, and many more.

== Career ==
=== Voice actress ===
Cimcoz, who was working at the Agricultural Products Bureau (Turkish: Toprak Mahsülleri Ofisi) as a translator, entered voice acting upon the recommendation of her voice actor brother Ferdi Tayfur. She dubbed for lead characters in both domestic and foreign films. She also provided support to her brother by dubbing for major female roles. Among the actresses she dubbed for were Türkan Şoray, Hülya Koçyiğit, Belgin Doruk, Fatma Girik, Filiz Akın, Muhterem Nur, and Neriman Köksal in numerous films. Her career in voice acting extended from 1936 until her death in 1970.

Cimcoz used the language of the common people. She adopted the expressions of the people heard during her childhood years in her father's house in the Kocamustafapaşa quarter of Old Istanbul. Finding the opportunity to watch all the tours of the traditional theater where she lived, she also performed the shadow play Karagöz and Hacivat at home. She transferred new and original folk expressions, and imitations of dialects captured from master Karagöz artists, to film. The owner of Lale Film, for whom Cimcoz worked many years, said that "she translated Ottoman Turkish language or foreign words and terms given in the screenplay into pure Turkish by making the dialogues kindly but firmly".

==== Filmography ( Voice ) ====
1. Aşk Mabudesi (Türkân Şoray) - 1969
2. Sonbahar Rüzgarları (Türkân Şoray) - 1969
3. Otobüs Yolcuları (Türkân Şoray) - 1969
4. Hayatım Sana Feda (Türkân Şoray) - 1969
5. Bana Derler Fosforlu (Türkân Şoray) - 1969
6. Köroğlu(Fatma Girik) - 1968
7. İstanbul Tatili - 1968
8. Artık Sevmeyeceğim (Türkân Şoray) - 1968
9. Kahveci Güzeli (Türkân Şoray) - 1968
10. Kelepçeli Melek (Türkân Şoray) - 1967
11. Eli Maşalı (Türkân Şoray) - 1966
12. Düğün Gecesi (Türkân Şoray) - 1966
13. Fakir Bir Gencin Romanı (Filiz Akın) - 1965
14. Serseri Aşık (Hülya Koçyiğit) - 1965
15. Taçsiz Kral (Ajda Pekkan) - 1965
16. Siyah Gözler (Türkân Şoray) - 1965
17. Hayatımın Kadını(Türkân Şoray) - 1965
18. Veda Busesi(Türkân Şoray - 1965
19. Vahşi Gelin (Türkân Şoray) - 1965
20. Yılların Ardından (Türkân Şoray) - 1964
21. Fıstık Gibi Maşallah (Türkân Şoray) - 1964
22. Öksüz Kız (Türkân Şoray) - 1964
23. Öp Annenin Elini (Fatma Girik) - 1964
24. Çalınan Aşk (Türkân Şoray) - 1963
25. Sipsevdi (Ajda Pekkan) - 1963
26. Belali Torun (Fatma Girik) - 1962
27. Kırmızı Karanfiller (Türkân Şoray) - 1962
28. Yalnizlar Için (1962) (Belgin Doruk) - 1962
29. Zorlu Damat(Türkân Şoray) - 1962
30. Otobüs Yolcuları (Türkân Şoray) - 1961
31. Melekler Şahidimdir (Türkân Şoray) - 1961
32. Aşk Rüzgarı (Türkân Şoray) - 1960
33. Aslan yavrusu (1960) (Leyla Sayar) - 1960
34. Sahildeki Kadın - 1954

=== Art curator ===
On 5 December 1950, Cimcoz opened an art gallery named "Maya" in Beyoğlu, Istanbul. It was the country's first private art gallery curated by a woman and remained the only one until its closure in 1955. Cimcoz started new exhibition concepts at the Maya Art Gallery. She prepared exhibitions with paintings inspired by poetry or music, and opened cartoon exhibits to support the acceptance of caricature as an art, in addition to mounting exhibitions of painting, sculpture, mosaic, ceramics, photography, patterns, and folk arts. Her presentation of the subjects in tandem realized an interdisciplinary dimension for the first time in art. Among the various works exhibited at Maya Art Gallery were those by Cemal Tollu, a member of the artist collective Group D, and by Melda Kaptana. Organized by the Friends of Art Association which Cimcoz co-founded, 61 works of women painters were on display in the gallery. Cimcoz also curated exhibitions to support child cartoonists.

=== Critic ===
Between 1950 and 1970, Cimcoz critiqued literature, art, and theatre for the periodicals Yeditepe, Varlık, and Yeni Ufuklar.

=== Translator ===
Already in her early years, Cimcoz became well known for her translations of poems from German to Turkish. From 1957 on, she translated German works by such authors as Berthold Brecht, Knut Hamsun, Georg Büchner, B. Traven, Lope de Vega, Franz Kafka, T. Tibor Déry, and Max Frisch into Turkish.

=== Gossip columnist ===
Cimcoz was one of the first gossip columnists of Turkey, writing under the pseudonym "Fitne Fücur" (literally: The Mischief-maker).

== Awards ==
- 1962 "Translation" Award of the Turkish Language Association for the Letters to Milena by Franz Kafka.

== Death and legacy ==
Cimcoz died of cancer on 13 March 1970 in Istanbul, aged 59. She was interred at Aşiyan Asri Cemetery.

The state-owned Turkish Radio and Television Corporation published a documentary film on Cimcoz's life on 1 December 2011. Her life is told in a 1972-published book titled Adalet Cimcoz-Bir Yaşamöyküsü Denemesi by Mine Söğüt.

== Translations ==
Following is a list of Cimcoz's translations:

- Ölüm Gemisi (The Death Ship by B. Traven, novel, 1957)
- Sezuanın İyi İnsanı (The Good Person of Szechwan by Bertold Brecht, play and three stories, 1961)
- Milena’ya Mektuplar (Letters to Milena by Franz Kafka, 1961)
- Dinamit (literally: Dynamite) (B. Traven, stories, 1963)
- Leonce ile Lena (Leonce and Lena by Georg Büchner, play, 1963)
- Galileo Galilei (Life of Galileo by Bertold Brecht, play, 1963)
- On Dakka Sonra Buffalo (Ten Minutes to Buffalo by Günter Grass, 1964)
- Bay Puntila ile Uşağı Matti (Mr Puntila and his Man Matti by Bertold Brecht, play 1965)
- Eğlentili Bir Gömme Töreni (literally: A Funny Burial Ceremony) (Tibor Déry, stories, 1967)
- Kafka’nm Sevgilisi Milena (Kafkas Freundin Milena by Margarete Buber-Neumann, 1967)
- Adanmış Topraklar Üstünde (literally: On the Promised Land) (Ephraim Kishon, satire, 1969)
