= Merkez Efendi =

Ottoman Islamic scholar and Sufi

Merkez Efendi was the popular nickname of Musa bin Muslihiddin bin Kılıç (1463–1552), an Ottoman Islamic scholar and Sufi. He is also credited as the founder of "Mesir macunu", a therapeutic paste believed to have cured mental diseases amongst many other benefits.

== Life ==
Musa bin Muslihiddin bin Kılıç was born in Akçaköy (then known as Sarımahmutlu) in Buldan district of Denizli Province. His father's name was Mustafa. He travelled to Bursa in 1478 and to Constantinople in 1493 to study religion. His tutor was Sünbül Efendi, founder of a branch of the Khalwati Sufi order. During the reign of Ottoman Sultan Selim I (r. 1512–1520), he was sent to Manisa to serve in the Külliye, the religious buildings complex of Sultan Selim's concubine Hafsa Sultan. In 1529, he returned to İstanbul as the successor of Sünbül Efendi. He was maybe briefly married to a Selim I's daughter, Şah Sultan from 1551 until he died in 1552. He had three children by his first wife: two sons Derviş Çelebi and Ali Çelebi, and a daughter Ümmü Hatun.

== Mesir ==
Merkez Efendi is credited as the creator of "Mesir macunu", a gum-like paste, which he prepared mixing 40 to 45 different herbs and spices. He used to medicate the patients having mental disease in the mental hospital of Manisa (Turkish: Manisa Bimarhanesi) he was the chief physician of mesir macunu. But Raşit Öngören from the Islam Encyclopedia finds this claim implausible. Nevertheless, he is popularly associated with the creation of mesir macunu. During the "Mesir Macunu Festival" held annually on 22 March, a symbolic Merkez Efendi figure throws down mesir from the şerefe (balcony) of a minaret in Manisa on the crowd.

== Legacy ==
Recently, a new secondary municipality and ilçe in Denizli was named Merkezefendi in his honor. In Zeytinburnu ilçe (district) of Istanbul, there is a neighborhood named Merkezefendi and a cemetery named Merkezefendi Cemetery. There are public buildings named after him, including a State Hospital, and a vocational and technical Anatolian High School in Manisa, as well as a primary school in Istanbul. The Municipality of Zeytinburnu organizes a Medicine Festival bearing his name.
