= Adalah =

Adalah can refer to:

- Adalah (legal center), a legal center for Arab minority rights in Israel
- Adalah Center for Rights and Freedoms, an Egyptian human rights organization
- Adalah-NY, a New York-based organization that campaigns for Boycott, Divestment and Sanctions (BDS) against Israel
- Adalah (Islam), the word for justice in Islam
- Adalah, another common name for the Indian halibut, Psettodes erumei

== See also ==
- Adalat (disambiguation)
