= Laqueur =

Laqueur is a surname, and the people with the surname include.

- Ludwig Laqueur (1839—1909), German ophthalmologist
- Marianne Laqueur (1918–2006), German Jewish refugee to Turkey, computer scientist and local politician
- Richard Laqueur (1881—1959), German historian and philologist
- Thomas W. Laqueur (born 1945), American historian, sexologist and writer
- Walter Laqueur (1921-2018), American historian and political commentator
