= Adalat Party =

Adalat party may refer to:

- Adalat Party (Azerbaijan), a defunct party in Azerbaijan
- Communist Party of Persia, its original name
- Justice Party (Azerbaijan), a modern party in Azerbaijan

== See also ==
- Adhaalath Party
- Adalat
