= Nurullah Berk =

Turkish painter, writer and an academician (1906–1982)

- Born: March 22, 1906; İstanbul
- Died: January 9, 1982 (aged 75); İstanbul

Nurullah Berk (March 22, 1906 – January 9, 1982) was a Turkish painter, writer and an academician who pioneered cubism and constructivism in Turkey.

After finishing Galatasaray High School he attended Sanayi-i Nefise Mektebi, today Mimar Sinan Fine Arts University, where he studied under Hikmet Onat and İbrahim Çallı. In 1924 he went to Paris to attend École des Beaux-Arts where he studied with Ernest Laurent and André Lhote. After finishing his studies in 1928 he returned to Istanbul. With some of his friends he established "Müstakil Ressamlar ve Heykeltıraşlar Birliği" (Union of Independent Painters and Sculptors). After five years, he again went to Paris and then returned in 1933. With other fellow artists Abidin Dino, Elif Naci, Zeki Faik İzer, Cemal Tollu and Zühtü Müridoğlu he became a leader of a movement that was described as a reaction to established 1914 generation impressionism and exploring cubism and constructionism. They eventually called themselves Group D. He was instrumental in developing a Turkish identity in painting.

In 1939 he joined the faculty of İstanbul Art Academy (Güzel Sanatlar Akademisi). In 1962 he was appointed as the director of State Art and Sculpture Museum (Resim Heykel Müzesi). Between 1932 and 1977 he published 15 books on painting, modern art and various famous painters. He held many exhibitions and won various awards. His best-known works are; “Still life with Playing Cards,” “Woman Ironing,” “The Tailor”, “The Concubine” and “Thorns”.

He was married to Münevver (Andaç), a cousin of Nazim Hikmet and had a daughter. Later they divorced and he then married Efser and had a daughter with her as well. He died in 1982 and buried in Heybeliada Cemetery.
