= Merkezefendi Cemetery =

Cemetery in Istanbul, Turkey

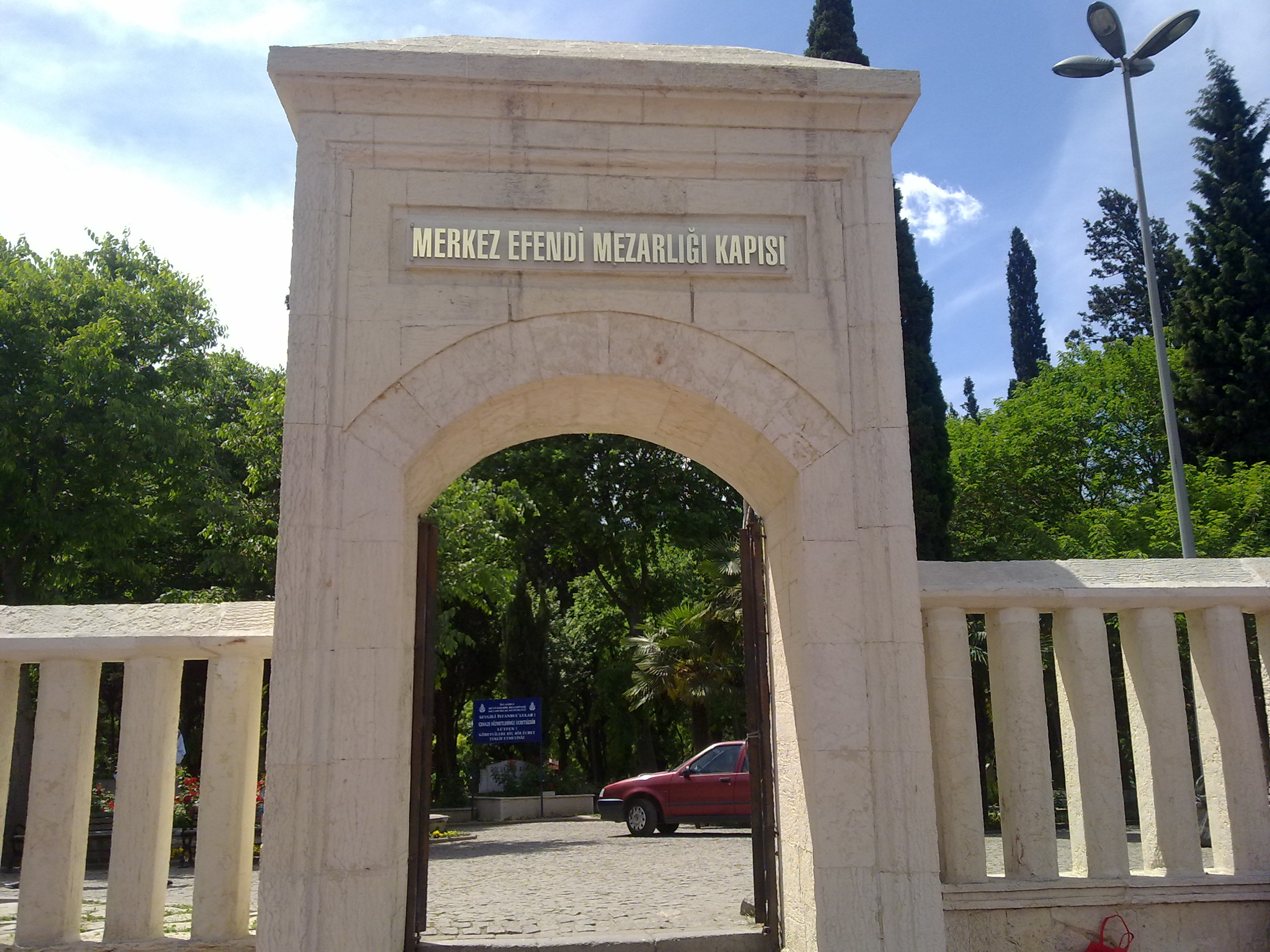
- Main gate of Merkezefendi Cemetery
- Interactive map of Merkezefendi Cemetery

Details
- Location: Zeytinburnu, Istanbul
- Country: Turkey
- Coordinates: 41.01562°N 28.92065°E
- Type: Public
- Owned by: Istanbul Metropolitan Municipality
- Website: İBB Mezarlıklar Md. website

The Merkezefendi Cemetery (Turkish: Merkezefendi Mezarlığı) is a burial ground situated in Merkezefendi neighborhood of Zeytinburnu district on the European part of Istanbul, Turkey. The neighborhood and the cemetery are named after Merkez Efendi, an Ottoman Islamic scholar and Sufi (1463–1552).

Many renowned intellectuals, writers and artists rest in this old cemetery covering an area of 27,800 m^{2} (299,000 sq ft).

The cemetery was established in the 16th century with the construction of the tomb of Merkez Efendi at this location. It was extended in the 1950s, and another cemetery, the Kozlu Cemetery was established 100 m (330 ft) away.

The cemetery was fully renovated in 2007. At the time of the burial of former Prime Minister Necmettin Erbakan in 2011, a comprehensive maintenance work was carried out at the cemetery.

Currently, burials are allowed only for the members of families with existing graves.

== Notable burials ==
Listed in order of death year:

- Abdullah Cevdet (1869–1932) writer, poet, translator, radical free-thinker and an ideologist of the Young Turks
- Rıza Nur (1879–1942) politician, writer
- Adnan Adıvar (1882–1955) physician, politician, writer
- Sadettin Kaynak (1895–1961) composer, musician
- Halide Edip Adıvar (1884–1964) novelist, feminist politician
- Hamdullah Suphi Tanrıöver (1885–1966), poet and politician
- Sabahattin Eyüboğlu (1908–1973) translator, essayist, film producer
- Samiha Ayverdi (1905–1993) novelist, Sufi
- Halil Hâlid (1869–1931) Turkish writer
- Mualla Eyüboğlu (1919–2009) architect, restorer
- Necmettin Erbakan (1926–2011) engineer, politician, former prime minister
- Toktamış Ateş (1944–2013) academician, writer
- Neşe Aybey (1930-2015) Miniaturist, Academic
