= Ezgi Eyüboğlu =

Turkish actress (born 1988)

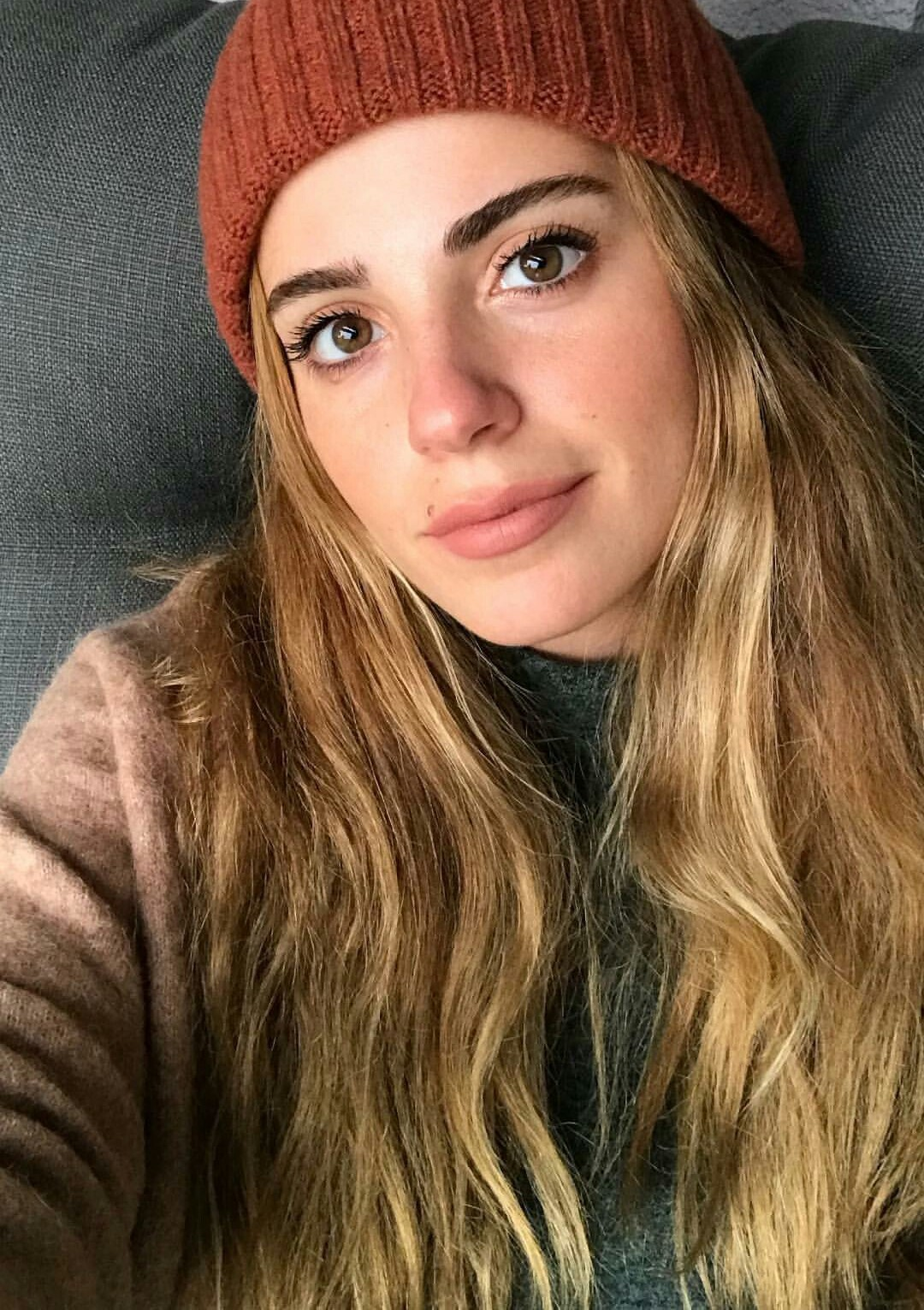
- Born: 15 June 1988 (age 38); Istanbul, Turkey
- Education: Istanbul University
- Occupation: Actress
- Years active: 2010–present
- Spouse: Kaan Yıldırım (m. 2016; div. 2019)

Ezgi Eyüboğlu (born 15 June 1988) is a Turkish actress.

== Early life ==
Ezgi Eyüboğlu was born on 15 June 1988 in Istanbul, Turkey. Her father is a banker and her mother is a chemistry teacher. Her paternal grandfather's relatives are Sabahattin Eyüboğlu, Bedri Rahmi Eyüboğlu and Mualla Eyüboğlu. Her maternal family is of Albanian descent. After completing her graduation in Istanbul University, Department of Economics, she completed her master's degree in advanced acting in Bahçeşehir University.

== Career ==
She started acting in 2010. She first acted in a few commercials. Then in 2011, she had lead role in the TV series Kalbim Seni Seçti. In 2012, she rose to prominence from the historical fiction series Muhteşem Yüzyıl, playing as the role of Aybige Hatun, a Crimean princess.

Simultaneously, she had leading role of Zeynep in the series Sudan Bıkmış Balıklar. In 2013-2014, she played the role of Cemre Arsoy in the series İntikam adaptation of Revenge. In 2014, she starred in the period series Yasak based on novel and comedy crime Ulan Istanbul.

In 2015, she portrayed the character of Kumsal Güçlu in the series Adı Mutluluk along with Ulan İstanbul's co-star Kaan Yıldırım. In 2017-2018, she depicted the character of Melike (Ahsen) in the historical fiction series Payitaht: Abdülhamid. In 2018, she portrayed the character of Çilek in the comedy film Yol Arkadaşım 2.She played in series "Bir Aile Hikayesi" adaptation of This is Us.

With Çağlar Ertuğrul, she played in agent series Teşkilat and film Seans.

== Personal life ==
On 14 May 2016, Eyüboğlu married Kaan Yıldırım in the Esma Sultan Mansion located in Ortaköy. However, the couple divorced on 26 June 2019.

== Filmography ==
Television
Year	Title	Role
2011	Kalbim Seni Seçti	Derin
2012	Muhteşem Yüzyıl	Aybige Hatun
2012	Sudan Bıkmış Balıklar	Zeynep
2013–2014	İntikam	Cemre Arsoy
2014	Yasak	Asude
2014	Ulan Istanbul	Ada Akça
2015	Adı Mutluluk	Kumsal Güçlü
2017–2018	Payitaht: Abdülhamid	Melike (Ahsen)
2019	Bir Aile Hikayesi	Nil
2021–2022	Teşkilat	Ceren (Ayşe)
Film
Year	Title	Role
2017	Aşkın Gören Gözlere İhtiyacı Yok	Nihal
2018	Yol Arkadaşım 2	Çilek
