= Semiha Berksoy =

Turkish opera singer and painter

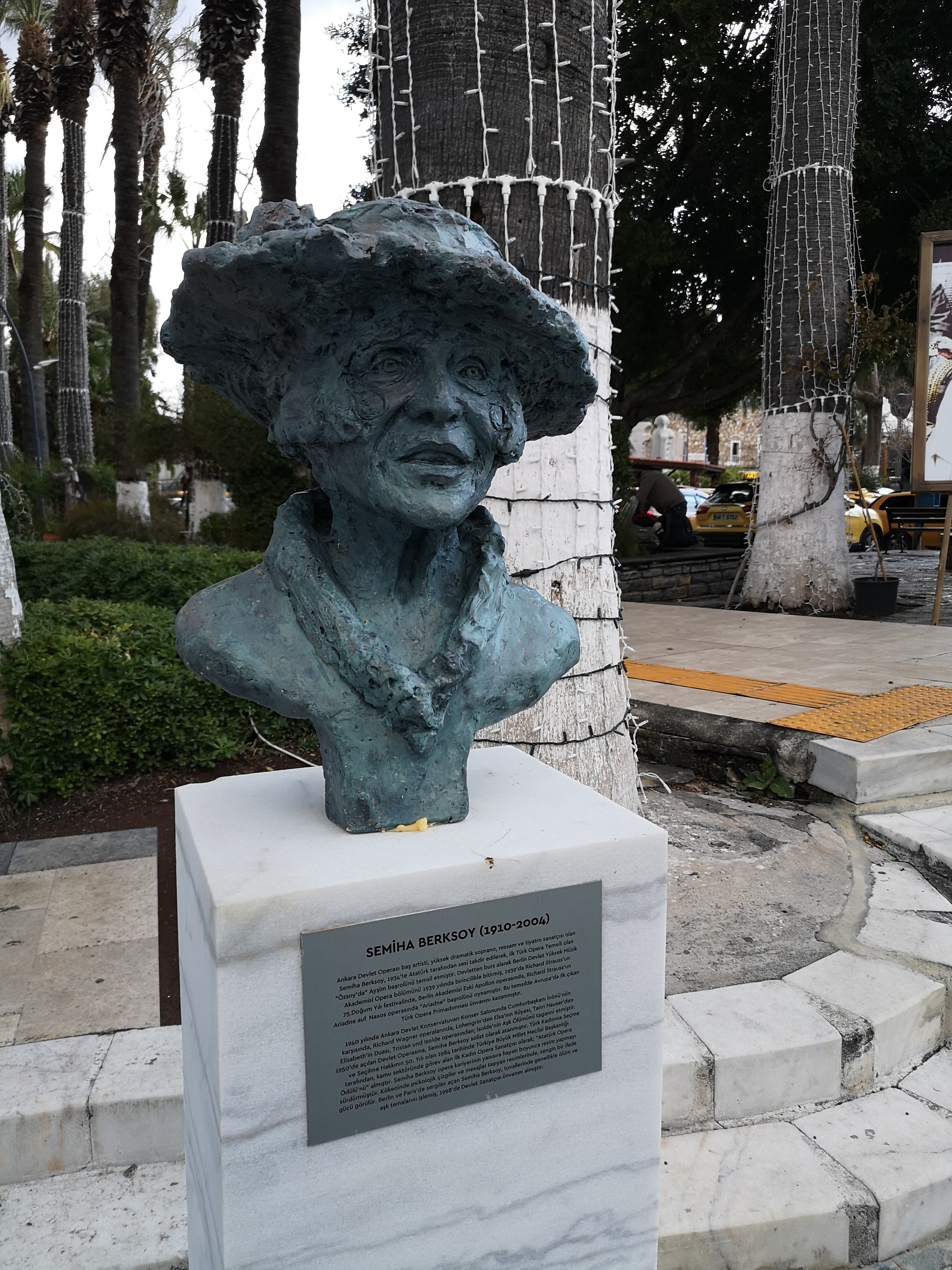
- Born: 24 May 1911; Istanbul, Ottoman Empire
- Died: 15 August 2004 (aged 93); Istanbul, Turkey
- Occupations: Opera singer, painter
- Years active: 1928-2004

Semiha Berksoy (24 May 1911 – 15 August 2004) was a Turkish opera singer and painter.

== Early life ==
Semiha Berksoy was born in Çengelköy, Istanbul on 25 May 1910. Her mother was a painter, her father a poet and accountant. Semiha Berksoy studied music and the visual arts at Istanbul Conservatory.

== Career ==
Berksoy started her acting career with the role of Semiha in the first Turkish sound movie İstanbul Sokaklarında directed by Muhsin Ertuğrul in 1931. She was cast in operettas in Istanbul theaters early in her career. She sang in the first Turkish opera Özsoy in 1934 (commissioned by Kemal Atatürk, composed by Adnan Saygun). She was honoured as the First Turkish Opera Singer and rewarded with the opportunity to go to Berlin Music Academy for further training. She started her international singing career in 1934, performing in Turkey, Germany and Portugal, becoming known as a Wagnerian soprano.

In 1939, for the 75th birthday of Richard Strauss in Berlin, she sang the role of Ariadne in Ariadne auf Naxos, becoming the first Turkish prima donna to perform on stage in Europe. Back in Turkey, she worked with Carl Ebert helping him in his efforts to create the Turkish State Opera and Ballet. This initiative lead to the creation of the Experimental Stage of the Ankara State Conservatory in 1940.

Berksoy retired from the Istanbul Opera in 1972. She was decorated with the "Atatürk Opera Award" at the 50th anniversary ceremony commemorating the introduction of women's rights to vote and to be elected. She received the title of "State Artist" in Turkey in 1998. Following her retirement, she remained active mostly as a theater artist.

Her paintings, frequently showing a small girl in a representation of herself, were also well known.

At the age of 90, she appeared in a dramatic scene singing Liebestod in Robert Wilson's opera The Days Before: Death, Destruction and Detroit III at the Lincoln Center in New York City (1999).

She died in Istanbul at the age of 94 due to complications related with heart surgery. She is survived by her daughter, Zeliha Berksoy.

== Commemoration ==
On 24 May 2019, on Berksoy’s 109th birthday, she was honoured with a Google Doodle.

Berksoy was celebrated in an exhibition Cumhuriyet Kadınları Sahneye Çıkıyor: Cevval, Akılcı, Dirençli, Sabırlı ve İnançlı, (Republican Women Take to the Stage: Brave, Rational, Resistant, Patient and Faithful) organised at Goethe-Institut Ankara from 5 December 2023 to 4 February 2024 in honour of the 100th anniversary of the founding of the Republic of Turkey and the 90th anniversary of Turkish women gaining the right to vote. It showcased the lives and careers of six women who were educated in the young Turkish Republic and the Weimar Republic and whose careers made an impact on the world. Alongside Berksoy the exhibition featured archaeologist Halet Çambel, architect Mualla Eyüboğlu Anhegger, computer scientist Marianne Laqueur, paediatrician Erna Eckstein Schlossmann and architect Margarete Schütte-Lihotzky.

== Filmography ==
- İstanbul Sokaklarında ("In the Streets of Istanbul"), (1931)
- Söz Bir, Allah Bir, (1933)
- Büyük Sır ("The Big Secret"), (1956)
- Karanlık Sular ("The Serpent's Tale"), (1993)
- Boulevard Bio, (2002)

== See also ==
- Turkish State Opera and Ballet
