= Sabahattin Eyüboğlu =

Turkish writer, essayist, translator and film producer (1908-1973)

- Born: 1908; Akçaabat, Trabzon, Ottoman Empire
- Died: January 13, 1973 (aged 64–65); Istanbul, Turkey
- Resting place: Merkezefendi Cemetery, Istanbul
- Education: French philology
- Occupations: Translator; writer; essayist; film producer
- Relatives: Bedri Rahmi Eyüboğlu (brother); Mualla Eyüboğlu (sister); Ezgi Eyüboğlu
- Writing career
- Notable awards: "Silver Bear" (1956 Berlin Film Festival)

Sabahattin Eyüboğlu (1908 – 13 January 1973) was a Turkish writer, essayist, translator and film producer.

== Biography ==
Sabahatttin Eyüboğlu was born in 1908 on the Black Sea coast town of Akçaabat near Trabzon in a family with five children. His father Mehmet Rahmi later Eyüboğlu was governor of Trabzon and was chosen by Mustafa Kemal Atatürk as a member of parliament. His younger brother was painter, writer and poet Bedri Rahmi Eyüboğlu and his younger sister was architect Mualla Eyüboğlu.

Sabahattin graduated from the Trabzon Lyceum and was sent to France, in order to study French in Dijon, Lyon and Paris. Upon his return to Turkey, he was appointed as associate professor at the Istanbul University and assistant to Leo Spitzer and Erich Auerbach. In 1939, Minister of Education Hasan Ali Yücel appointed him to the Ministry of Education, where he worked till 1947. He was also appointed as associate director of the Translation Office, a newly established department, responsible for the translation of the masterpieces of world literature. During the same period of time, he was a very strong supporter of the Village Institutes and himself taught at Hasanoğlan Village Institute near Ankara.

With the fall of minister Hasan Ali Yücel, he lost his position and left for Paris as an inspector of Turkish students in France. Back in Istanbul, he returned to his position at the university until 1960. His name was among the 147 professors fired in 1960 by the university, he was found not guilty and was asked to return to his position, which he refused. He taught history of art at the Istanbul Technical University and did translation work.

He died of a heart attack on January 13, 1973, and was laid to rest at the Merkezefendi Cemetery in Istanbul.

== Career ==
Sabahattin Eyüboğlu is a well-known writer, art critic, a translator and also one of the first documentary film producers in his country. Among the films one can find: The Hitite Sun, winner of the "Silver Bear" award at the 1956 Berlin Film Festival. Black Pen, Book of Festivities, Colors in Darkness, Roman mosaics in Anatolia, The Roads of Anatolia, The Gods of Nemrud, The Waters of ancient Antalya, The Mother Goddess, The World of Karagöz, To Live, Colored Walls, Cappadocia, Forty Fountains, Tülü.

His contribution as a translator is considerable and unsurpassed. His translation of Michel de Montaigne, Jean de La Fontaine, Ivan Goncharov, William Shakespeare, Plato, Albert Camus, François Rabelais, Paul Valéry, Jean-Paul Sartre, Aristophanes, Omar Khayyám, Arthur Miller, Molière, Franz Kafka, Bertrand Russell, François-Noël Babeuf etc. One should remember also that following the reform of the language by Atatürk, his work at the translation office allowed him to hold an important place in the implementation of the new Turkish language cleaned of Arabic and Persian words.

In 1945, answering the call of Cevat Şakir Kabaağaçlı (alias "The Fisherman of Halicarnassus"), he took part with his brother Bedri Rahmi and a few writers in a trip along the coasts of the Aegean Sea and the Mediterranean, in search of the Anatolian civilizations and, was the one, who named this cruise "the Blue Cruise" ("Mavi Yolculuk" in Turkish). Azra Erhat wrote a book on the trip, which became a classic and a reference.
