= Mualla Eyüboğlu =

Turkish architect (1919–2009)

Mualla Eyüboğlu Anhegger
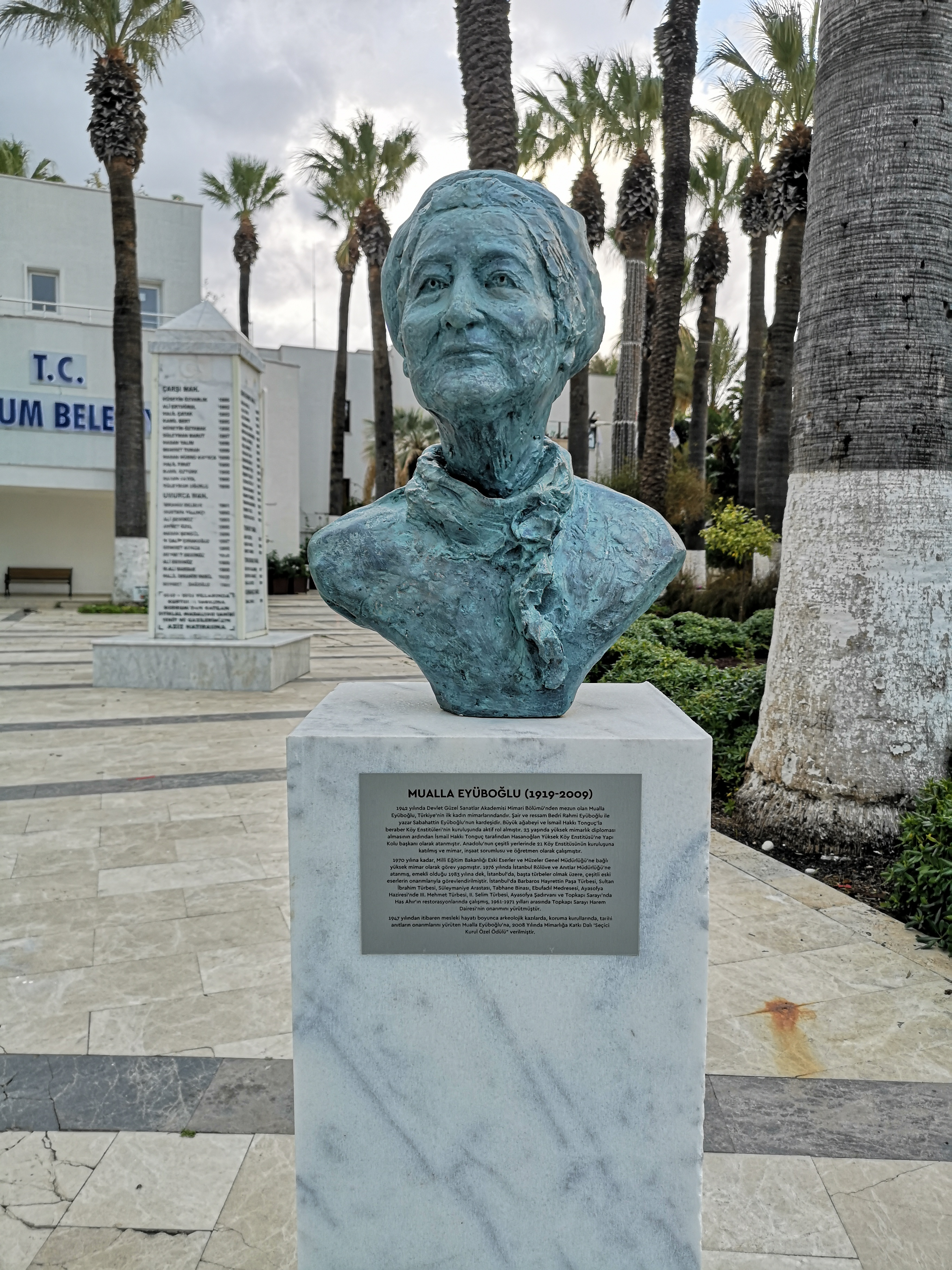
- Bust of Mualla Eyüboğlu in Bodrum, Turkey
- Born: Mualla Eyuboğlu; March 13, 1919; Aziziye, Sivas Vilayet, Ottoman Empire
- Died: August 16, 2009 (aged 90); Istanbul, Turkey
- Resting place: Merkezefendi Cemetery
- Education: Academy of Fine Arts in Istanbul
- Occupations: Architect, vocational teacher, restorer
- Spouse: Robert Anhegger (m. 1958)
- Relatives: Sabahattin Eyüboğlu (brother); Bedri Rahmi Eyüboğlu (brother); Ezgi Eyüboğlu

Mualla Eyüboğlu Anhegger (13 March 1919 – 16 August 2009) was one of the first female Turkish architects. She is known for her restoration work on the Topkapı Palace harem room and the Rumelihisarı in Istanbul.

== Early life and education ==
Eyüboğlu was born in 1919 in Aziziye, Sivas vilayet (modern-day Pınarbaşı, Kayseri), in a family with five children. She was the younger sister of well known Turkish painter and poet, Bedri Rahmi Eyüboğlu, and Sabahattin Eyüboğlu, an author, academic and translator. Her father, Mehmet Rahmi later Eyüboğlu, was the Governor of Trabzon and a member of parliament chosen by Mustafa Kemal Atatürk.

Her family moved to Istanbul, where she enrolled in a regular high school, unlike many of her peers who often attended all girls colleges. After graduating from high school, Eyüboğlu was educated in fine arts at the Academy of Fine Arts in Istanbul and became an architect in 1942. She later explained her family's commitment to education, especially for women, saying, "We grew up with Atatürk's reforms. That was what Atatürk had indoctrinated in us. That we would finish school and serve our country."

After the academy, she began working in the small village of Hasanoğlan, Ankara Province, where she facilitated the construction of a village institutes. The Turkish government was working to develop the small villages and communities of Anatolia at the time, and the village institutes were considered essential to educating its citizens. Eyüboğlu later said in an interview:

Village institutes were an education project that targeted the whole of Anatolia. When the Turkish Republic was founded in 1923, 90 percent of the population lived in rural areas and only 3 percent of the population was literate. It was a must to educate people. So the country was divided into 21 parts and in each was built an institute that not only taught people how to read and write but also crafts like carpentry and planting.

== Career ==
Eyüboğlu planned new institutes and schools in villages throughout rural Turkey during the 1940s. She caught malaria in 1947, which forced her to leave Anatolia and move back to Istanbul. The government also ended its support for the village institute program during the 1950s, which forced her to settle in Istanbul.

She began working at the Istanbul Academy of Fine Arts once she recovered from malaria. However, she soon began traveling outside Istanbul again as an excavation architect. In 1948, she met her future husband Robert Anhegger, a German scholar in the field of Ottoman and Turkish studies. The couple married in 1958 using an ancient wedding ring.

We got married in 1958, in the 10th anniversary of our friendship. He proposed to me with a ring that was from the 4th century A.D. After my father's death, I was feeling lonely and I couldn't resist his insistence anymore.

Eyüboğlu began working as a restoration architect in Istanbul following her marriage. Her most famous restoration projects included the landmark Topkapı Palace's harem section and Rumelihisarı. In 2008 she was given a special jury award for in the Achievement Award for special contribution in architecture at the Turkish National Architecture Awards in Ankara.

Eyüboğlu and Anhegger bought an apartment in a legendary building in Istanbul's Galata district in 1964. She decorated her apartment with artifacts collected from throughout her travels in Anatolia. The couple remained married until Anhegger's death in 2001. She mourned the death of her husband, with whom she had been together for more than 40 years, "I couldn't accept his will to be cremated. After his cremation, I lived with his ashes in the house for a week." She continued to live at her residence following Anhegger's death. Her goal was to donate her collection to a small museum. Unfortunately her wish was not realized, as her heirs sold the entire contents of that magical apartment to the highest bidder.

Mualla Eyüboğlu Anhegger died on August 16, 2009, at the age of 90. She was laid to rest at the Merkezefendi Cemetery following the religious funeral service at Teşvikiye Mosque.

== Commemoration ==
Eyüboğlu was celebrated in an exhibition Cumhuriyet Kadınları Sahneye Çıkıyor: Cevval, Akılcı, Dirençli, Sabırlı ve İnançlı, (Republican Women Take to the Stage: Brave, Rational, Resistant, Patient and Faithful) organised at Goethe-Institut Ankara from 5 December 2023 to 4 February 2024 in honour of the 100th anniversary of the founding of the Republic of Turkey and the 90th anniversary of Turkish women gaining the right to vote. It showcased the lives and careers of six women who were educated in the young Turkish Republic and the Weimar Republic and whose careers made an impact on the world. Alongside Eyüboğlu the exhibition featured archaeologist Halet Çambel, computer scientist Marianne Laqueur, Semiha Berksoy, Turkey's first Muslim opera singer, paediatrician Erna Eckstein Schlossmann and architect Margarete Schütte-Lihotzky.
