= Kaan Yıldırım =

Turkish actor (born 1986)

- Born: 24 December 1986 (age 39); Istanbul, Turkey
- Occupations: Actor; producer
- Years active: 2013–present
- Spouse(s): Ezgi Eyüboğlu (m. 2016; div. 2019) Pınar Deniz (m. 2024)
- Children: 1

Kaan Yıldırım (born 24 December 1986) is a Turkish actor and producer.

== Early life ==
Yıldırım was born on 24 December 1986 in Istanbul, Turkey. His maternal grandmother is of Bosnian descent. His father, Hakan Yıldırım is the owner of a medical company. After getting a degree in marketing from Brunel University London, he studied acting at Başkent Communication Sciences Academy.

== Career ==
Yıldırım started his acting career with a supporting role in the crime series Kayıp alongside Aslı Enver, İlker Kaleli. His main breakthrough came with his role in popular series Ulan İstanbul, in which he acted alongside his ex-wife Ezgi Eyüboğlu, Uğur Polat, Sevtap Özaltun, Erkan Kolçak Köstendil and Şebnem Bozoklu. In 2015, he played the role of Batu Değirmenci in the series Adı Mutluluk, along with his co-star Ezgi Eyüboğlu.

He played in spin off series Klavye Delikanlıları of franchise comedy films "Çakallarla Dans". After appearing in a leading role in TRT 1's crime series Halka alongside Hande Erçel, Serkan Çayoğlu. He was cast in Hekimoğlu, an adaptation of American series House.

== Personal life ==
On 14 May 2016, he married Ezgi Eyüboğlu in the Esma Sultan Mansion located in Ortaköy. However, the couple divorced on 26 June 2019.

From 2019 to 2020, he was in a relationship with singer Hadise. The two split in December 2020.

He was linked to actress and Halka co-star Hande Erçel from April to June 2022.

Since the summer of 2022, he has been in a relationship with actress Pınar Deniz. They got married on 17 September 2024 in Italy. Their son was born in March 2025.

== Filmography ==
Web Series
Year	Title	Role	Notes
2023	Mevlânâ Celâleddîn-i Rûmî	Ömer	Leading role

TV Series
Year	Title	Role	Notes
2013	Kayıp	Kadir	Supporting role
2014–2015	Ulan İstanbul	Ferdi	Supporting role
2015	Adı Mutluluk	Batu	Leading role
2016	Kalbim Yangın Yeri	Volkan	Leading role
2017	Klavye Delikanlıları	Kerem	Leading role
2018	İnsanlık Suçu	Cemal Gökdemir	Leading role
2019	Halka	Kaan Karabulut	Leading role
2019–2021	Hekimoğlu	Mehmet Ali Çağlar	Leading role
2022–2023	Sipahi	Korkut Ali Türkoğlu	Leading role
2024–	Kopuk	Ferhan / Orhan	Leading role

Film
Year	Tite	Role	Notes
2016	Yok Artık 2!		Supporting role
2017	Bölük		Leading role
2020	Gelincik		Leading role
2021	Dijital Sahne: Bir Yaz Gecesi		Short Theatre
2026	Djinn Wedding (Cinlerin Düğünü)		Platform Competition, Toronto

Producer
Year	Tite	Role	Notes
2014	Ümmü Sıbyan: Zifir		Film
2015	Yok Artık!		Film
2016	Yok Artık 2!		Film
2020	Gelincik		Film
