= Toktamış Ateş =

Turkish academic and political commentator (1944-2013)

- Born: 4 April 1944; Istanbul, Turkey
- Died: 19 January 2013 (aged 68); Çapa, Fatih, Istanbul, Turkey
- Education: Istanbul University
- Spouse: Nevin Ateş
- Scientific career
- Fields: Political history
- Workplaces: Istanbul University

Toktamış Ateş (4 April 1944 – 19 January 2013) was a Turkish academic, political commentator, columnist and writer. He was professor of political sciences at Istanbul University.

== Biography ==
Toktamış Ateş was born in Istanbul. After graduating from St. George's Austrian Secondary School and Vefa High School, he was admitted to Istanbul University Faculty of Economics and received his BA degree in 1967.

He started his academic career as a research assistant at department of political sciences in Istanbul University Faculty of Economics. He earned Doctor of Science degree with a thesis entitled "Kuruluş Dönemi Osmanlı Toplumunun Siyasal Yapısı" ("Political Structure of the Ottoman Society in Establishment Period") in 1969 and became an associate professor (doçent) in 1974 at the same faculty. He became a full professor in 1982.

He lectured in Turkey, United States and Germany. He wrote daily columns for Cumhuriyet and Bugün. He participated panel discussion program Siyaset Meydanı as a political commentator.

He died on 19 January 2013 in Istanbul University Faculty of Medicine Hospital. His funeral was held at both Istanbul University and Fatih Mosque, and buried in Merkezefendi Cemetery on 21 January 2013.
