= Mari Gerekmezyan =

Armenian-Turkish sculptor

- Born: 1913; Talas, Kayseri, Ottoman Empire
- Died: 1947 (aged 33–34); Istanbul, Turkey
- Resting place: Şişli Armenian Cemetery; Republic of Turkey
- Education: Istanbul University; Istanbul Fine Arts Academy (guest student)
- Partner: Bedri Rahmi Eyüboğlu (in the 1940s)
- Awards: Ankara Sculpture Exhibit Award (1943); First Place, Ankara State Fine Arts Exhibit (1945)

Mari Gerekmezyan (Armenian: Մարի Կերեքմէզեան; 1913–1947) was one of Turkey's first female sculptors and the first female Armenian sculptor. She was the lover of the Turkish poet and painter Bedri Rahmi Eyüboğlu.

== Life ==
Mari Gerekmezyan was born in the Talas village in Kayseri, Ottoman Empire. She attended the local Vart Basrig Primary Armenian School. She moved to Istanbul where she attended the Yesayan Armenian School. While studying at Yesayan, Gerekmezyan had the opportunity to meet famed Turkish author Ahmet Hamdi Tanpınar.

Tanpınar inspired Gerekmezyan to pursue a degree in philosophy. She would go on the study at the University of Istanbul. She would become a guest student at the sculpture department of the Mimar Sinan Fine Arts University (formerly Fine Arts Academy, Istanbul) where Bedri Rahmi Eyüpoğlu was working as an assistant. She made his bust. At the academy, she was taught by famed German sculptor Rudolf Belling.

Gerekmezyan was an art and Armenian language teacher at the Getronagan Armenian High School and Esayan High Schools in Istanbul. She also taught at the Arti Gırtaran Primary school in Istanbul which is still open today.

In 1946, Gerekmezyan caught Tuberculous meningitis. Due to the Second World War which had just ended, medicine was very expensive. Bedri Rahmi sold many of his paintings but was not able to save Gerekmezyan. Gerekmezyan died in 1947 at the age of 35. She is buried in the Sisli Armenian Cemetery.

Bedri Rahmi Eyüboğlu started drinking after her death. In 1949, when he was reading the Karadut poem at the Büyük Kulüp he broke into tears. His wife, Eren Eyüboğlu, left their home and started to live in France. His wife and children would later return to him but his wife never forgot this.

== Works ==
Much of Gerekmezyan's works are missing. Her remaining works are found in the Resim ve Heykel Müzesi (Museum of Painting and Sculpture) in Istanbul and in the Private Collection of the Eyüboğlu Family which includes her famous bust of Bedri Rahmi. Some of Mari Gerekmezyan's most famous works include:

- Bust of Prof. Neşet Ömer (1943)
- Bust of Prof. Şekip Tunç (1943)
- Mask of Patrik Mesrob Tin (1944)
- Bust of Yahya Kemal Beyatlı (1945)
- Bust of Bedri Rahmi Eyübğlu

== Awards ==
Gerekmezyan was awarded the Ankara Sculpture Exhibit Award for her Busts of Professor Neşet Omer and Professor Şekip Tunç in 1943. She earned the First Place Award at the Ankara State Fine Arts Exhibit for her Bust of poet Yahya Kemal Beyatlı in 1945.

== Relationship with Eyüboğlu ==
While Gerekmezyan was a guest student at the sculpture division of Mimar Sinan Fine Arts University (formerly Fine Arts Academy, Istanbul), where she met Bedri Rahmi Eyüboğlu, a married instructor. Throughout the 1940s, Gerekmezyan assisted Bedri Rahmi Eyüboğlu in his artwork. The two fell in love. Their relationship is compared to the likes of Auguste Rodin and Camille Claudel. Gerekmezyan had sculpted many busts of Eyüboğlu and Eyüboğlu likewise drew many sketches of Gerekmezyan.

Eyüboğlu wrote his famous poem Karadut (Mulberry) for Mari Gerekmezyan after her death:

Turkish language:

Karadut
Karadutum, çatal karam, çingenem
Nar tanem, nur tanem, bir tanem
Ağaç isem dalımsın salkım saçak
Petek isem balımsın ağulum
Günahımsın, vebalimsin.
Dili mercan, dizi mercan, dişi mercan
Yoluna bir can koyduğum
Gökte ararken yerde bulduğum
Karadutum, çatal karam, çingenem
Daha nem olacaktın bir tanem
Gülen ayvam, ağlayan narımsın
Kadınım, kısrağım, karımsın.

English translation:
Mulberry
My black mulberry, my forked darky, my Gypsy,
My grain of pomegranate, my grain of light, my only one;
I am a tree, my limbs, a porch hanging with grapes,
I am a hive, you are my honey, my bitter honey,
My sin, my ague.
Tongue of coral, teeth of coral, thighs of oyster,
I gave you a life, my wife,
My black mulberry, my forked darky, my Gypsy,
What more will you be to me, my odd one, queer one,
My smiling quince, my weeping pomegranate,

My baby, my mare, my wife.

— Bedri Rahmi Eyüboğlu,

When he first read the poem in public, Eyüboğlu cried. It is believed that Eyüboğlu continued to love Gerekmezyan the rest of his life. The poem would become popular as it was incorporated into Cem Karaca's song Karadut.

== Legacy ==
The Getronagan Armenian High School in Istanbul hosted an exhibition for Mari Gerekmezyan in December 2012, organized by famed Armenian-Turkish photographer Ara Güler.
