= Adalet Shukurov =

Azerbaijani singer (born 1966)

Ədalət Şükürov
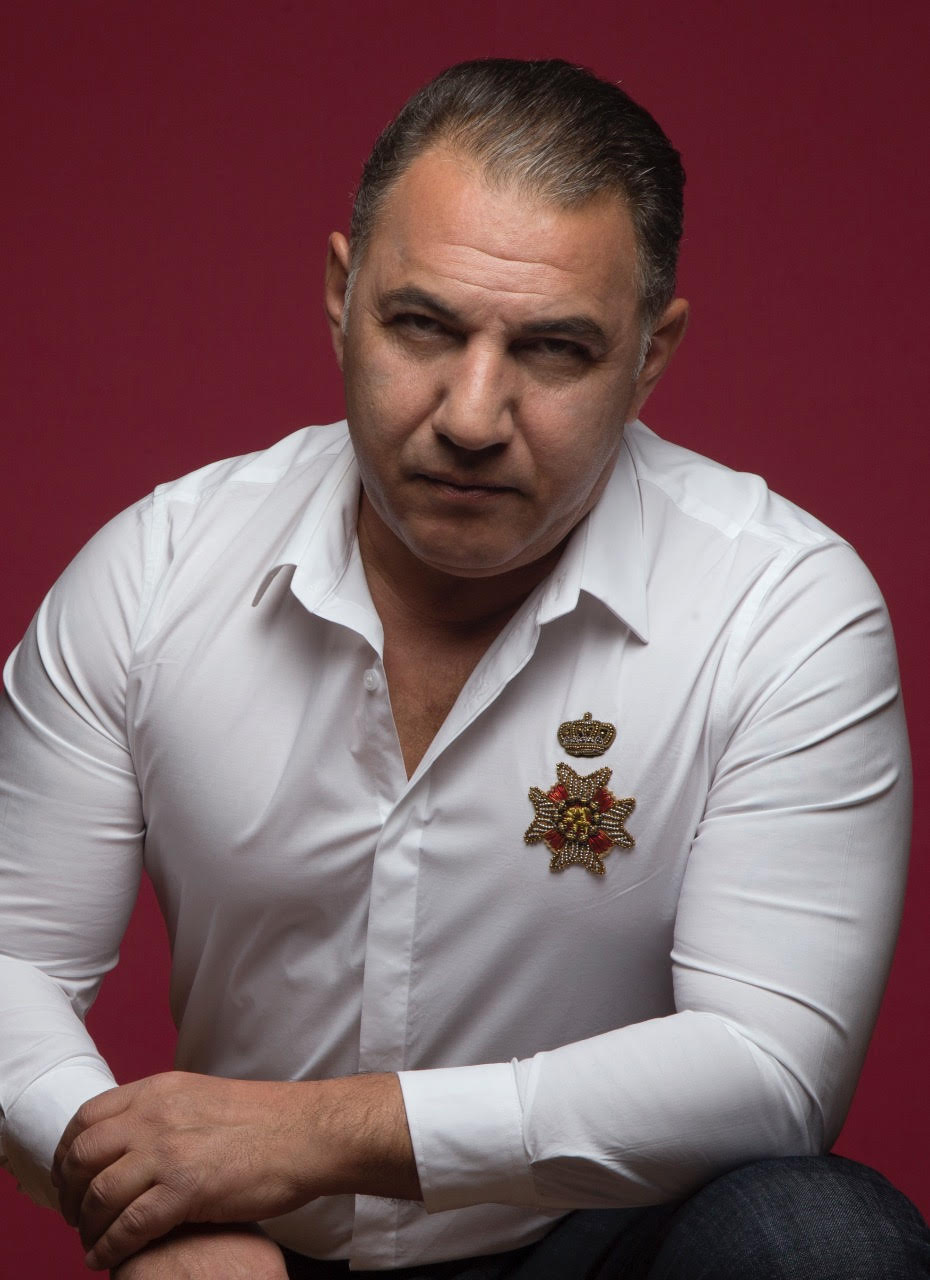

Background information
- Also known as: Ədalət
- Born: April 22, 1966 (age 60); Sumgait, Azerbaijan
- Origin: Azerbaijani
- Genre: Pop
- Occupation: Singer
- Website: http://www.adaletshukurov.com

Ədalət Şükürov (full name Ədalət Zakir oğlu Şükürov), also known as simply Ədalət (born 22 April 1966), is an Azerbaijani pop singer and celebrity in Azerbaijan.

== Biography ==
Ədalət Şükürov was born on 22 April 1966 in the city of Sumgait north of Baku, Azerbaijan. After he finished school, he was drafted into Soviet Army and served three years in submarine near the Novaya Zemlya islands in Arkhangelsk Oblast of Russia. In 1987, he began studying in Saint Petersburg University of Economy, Culture and Business Administration in the faculty of "Many Events Director". When he finished the university, he began working in television network Petersburg – Channel 5 of the city in the capacity of director of "Adamovo Yabloko" show. Some time later, he moved to the city of Luga, Leningrad Oblast and began holding many events. In this city, Adalet started writing poems and composing music. After that, he began singing and performing on stage. The first song he sang was "Nişan üzüyü" which means "Engagement ring" in Azerbaijani language. This is the song he sang in his first time appearance on AzTV in Baku.

Adalet likes to travel and has been on stage in about 50 countries of the world. He also finished "Salsa Viva" dance school and is also involved in artisting design. He speaks English, Spanish, Russian and Azeri fluently. He got married in 1993. He has two kids: daughter Zhale and son Emil.

== Official albums ==
| Year | Title |
|---|---|
| 2002 | "Əzizim" |
| 2002 | "22 aprel" |
| 2002 | "Demə-demə" |
| 2003 | "Qapı" |
| 2004 | "Qoca çinar" |
| 2005 | "Itirdim" |

=== "Itirdim" album ===
- 1. İtirdim
- 2. Sənsiz gecə
- 3. Sevgi keçdi
- 4. Əlvida
- 5. Gözlər
- 6. İtirdim
- 7. Nələr keçdi (duet Aygün Bəylər)
- 8. Məni bu qədərmi sevdin?
- 9. Qırmızı yaylıq
- 10. Matros (Remake)
- 11. Sən ki, belə deyildin
- 12. Dərd eyləyir

=== "Qoca çinar" album ===
- 1-Qoca çinar
- 2-Göz yaşları (Ədalət and Manana)
- 3-O qadın
- 4-Sən elə, mən belə (Ədalət, Vüqar, Kamran)
- 5-Yox (Ədalət, Maestro Ceyhun, "Odlar yurdu" orchestra)
- 6-Açıq qapı (Meyxana feat. Vüqar)
- 7-Tələsdim
- 8-Göz yaşları (Ədalət and Manana) remix
- 9-Bağlı qapı (Lezginka)

=== "Qapı" album ===
- 1-Bağlı qapı (Meyxana feat. Vüqar)
- 2-Serenada
- 3-Yanaqlar
- 4-Bağlı qapı
- 5-Cənnət ölkəm
- 6-Ayrılıb gedirəm
- 7-Oyna ay qız

=== "Demə-demə" album ===
- 1-Bəri gəl
- 2-Demə-demə
- 3-Dünya sənindi
- 4-Mənim başı bəlalı sevgim
- 5-Sən ki belə deyildin
- 6-Yavaş-yavaş

=== "22 aprel" album ===
- 22 Aprel

=== "Əzizim" album ===
- 1-Avara
- 2-Bir yaz axşamı
- 3-Əzizim
- 4-Gəl barışaq yeni il axşamı
- 5-Mən tək qalanda
