= Macun =

Turkish toffee paste

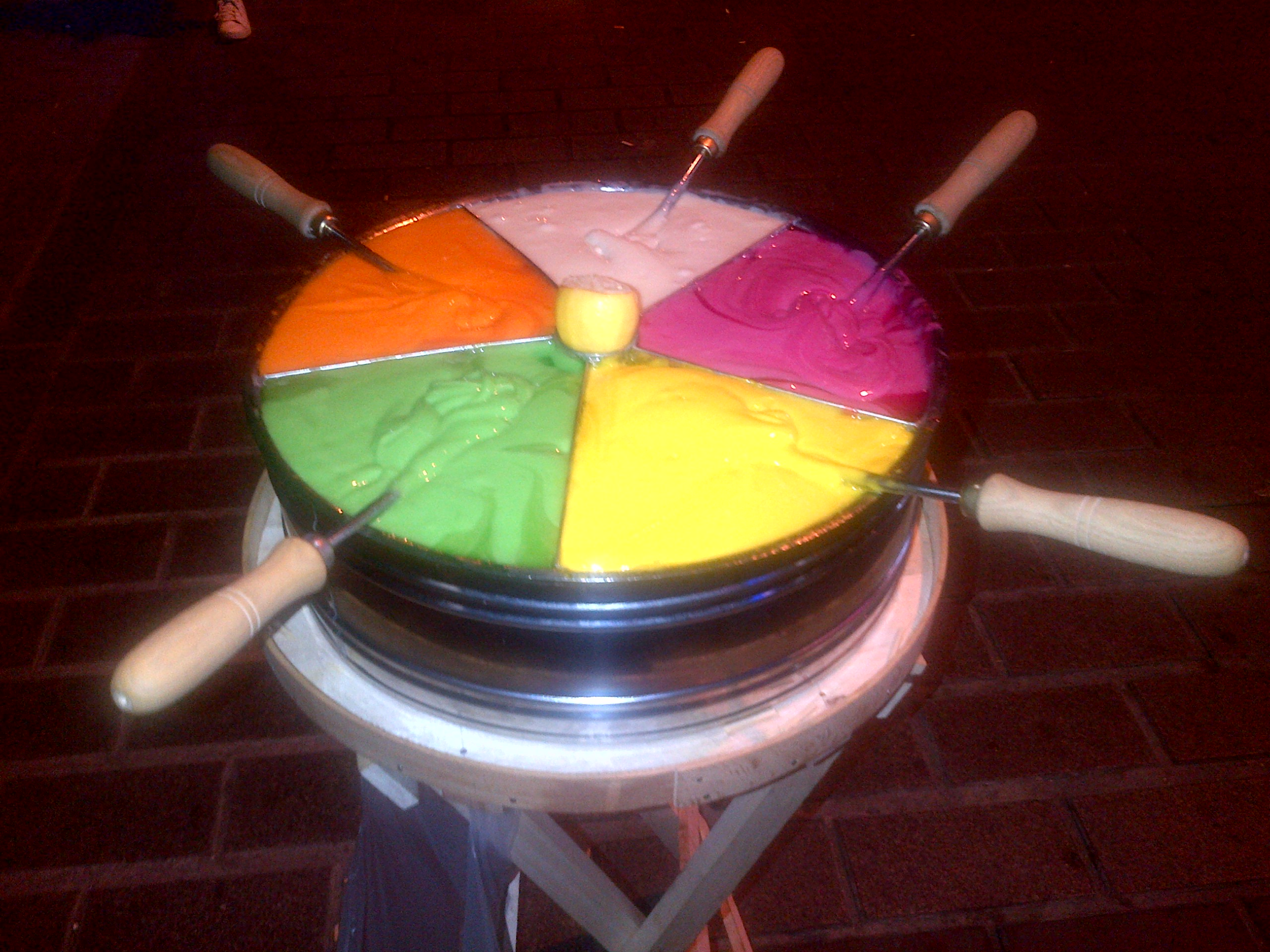
Macun in Turkey

Macun (in Turkish also Macun şekeri) is a soft, sweet and colorful Turkish toffee paste. It is a street food that may be prepared with many herbs and spices. Macun originated from spicy preparations of Mesir macunu, a traditional Turkish herbal paste from the Ottoman empire. During classical antiquity, macun was consumed as a pharmaceutical medicine. It was historically served in a round tray with separate compartments for the various flavors, a serving style that has continued into modern times. The consumption of macun is a part of some Turkish customs.

== Overview ==
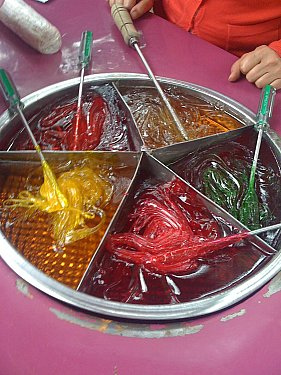
Macun

Macun is a street food that is often sold outdoors, especially during street festivals (panayır). It is a popular sweet among children. The color of various macuns may be vivid or bright. Macun may be prepared with a great deal of herbs and spices. Ingredients to flavor macun have traditionally included bergamot, cinnamon, mastic, mint, rose, lemon and plum.

== History ==
Macun originated from spicy preparations of Mesir macunu, a traditional herbal paste from the Ottoman empire. During classical antiquity, macun was consumed as a pharmaceutical medicine.

Macun was purported to have therapeutic effects to give the body strength and to calm one's spirit. Islamic physicians have prepared hundreds of different varieties of macun. The various herbs and spices used were mixed with honey in macun preparation, the latter of which also served to preserve the product. Various macuns have been served and consumed as both a medicine and as a confectionery (sweetmeats). During the Ottoman period, macun named Neruz macunu, also referred to as nevruziyye, was consumed as both a medicine and confectionery.

During the 17th century in Turkey, the dervish Seyyid Hasan denoted the consumption of two flavors of macun, respectively flavored with mint and sweet flag. These macun varieties were served at meals he consumed with other dervishes and friends. Hasan was a part of the Sunbuliyye mystic order, as its sheikh.

== Service ==
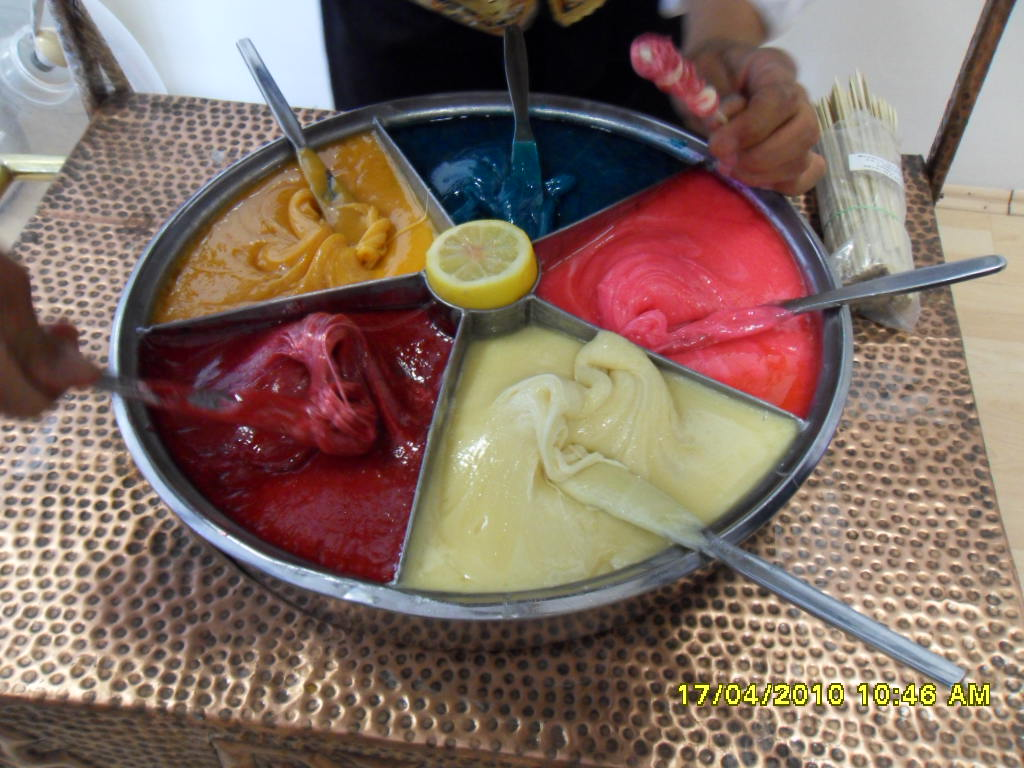
Macun being served in its traditional container

Macun is typically served in a round tin tray that has separate triangular-shaped compartments. It may be served by scooping using a macuncu mablaği or macunkeș, which is shaped like a screwdriver. The macun is scooped and then wrapped around a small stick. This may be done with alternate flavors, which creates a striped sweet. In Turkey, people that serve macun may be referred to as macuncu.

=== History ===
In the past in Turkey, the serving trays were constructed from copper or wood, and street vendors would stand the macun trays upon portable tripods. Others would carry macun in a container strapped to their waist with a belt, whereby the container had separate compartments for various flavors of the macun. Some macun vendors in Istanbul, Turkey, would try to attract customers and compete with other vendors by playing music. Street vendors would purvey macun to people at the Hıdırellez spring festival, on market days, holidays, at wedding processions, and at other times.

== Customs ==
In the Anatolia region, it is a wedding custom for the groom to eat macun on the night of his wedding. The mesir bayrami ceremony in Manisa, Turkey, involves the distribution of macun to people on the streets.

== See also ==
- List of Turkish desserts
- List of desserts
