= Margarete Schütte-Lihotzky =

Austrian architect

- Born: Margarete Lihotzky; 23 January 1897; Vienna, Austria-Hungary
- Died: 18 January 2000 (aged 102); Vienna, Austria
- Education: University of Applied Arts Vienna
- Occupation: Architect
- Spouse: Wilhelm Schütte
- Design: Frankfurt kitchen

Margarete "Grete" Schütte-Lihotzky (née Lihotzky; 23 January 1897 – 18 January 2000) was an Austrian architect and a communist activist in the Austrian resistance to Nazism. She is mostly remembered today for designing what is known as the Frankfurt kitchen.

== Early life and education ==
Margarete Lihotzky was born on 23 January 1897 into a bourgeois family in Margareten, since 1850 part of Vienna. Her grandfather Gustav Lihotzky was a mayor of Czernowitz, Ducal Bukovina, and her mother Julie Bode was relative of Wilhelm von Bode. Her father was a liberal-minded civil servant, Erwin Lihotzky, whose pacifism made him welcome the end of the Habsburg Empire and the founding of the republic in 1918. Lihotzky became the first female student at the Kunstgewerbeschule, today the University of Applied Arts Vienna), where renowned artists such as Josef Hoffmann, Anton Hanak, and Oskar Kokoschka taught. Lihotzky almost did not get in. Her mother persuaded a close friend to ask the famous artist Gustav Klimt for a letter of recommendation. In 1997, celebrating her 100th birthday and reminiscing about her decision to study architecture, she remarked that "in 1916 no one would have conceived of a woman being commissioned to build a house – not even myself."

Lihotzky studied architecture under Oskar Strnad, winning prizes for her designs even before her graduation. Strnad was one of the pioneers of sozialer Wohnbau in Vienna, affordable yet comfortable social housing for the working classes. Inspired by him, Lihotzky understood that connecting design to functionality was the new trend that would be in demand in the future. After graduating, among her other projects, she collaborated with Adolf Loos, planning settlements for World War I invalids and veterans. During this time she also worked alongside architect Josef Frank and philosopher Otto Neurath in the context of the newly founded Austrian Settlement and Allotment Garden Association where she developed core houses. Her memories of these and many other Austrian architects and intellectuals are collected in her book Warum ich Architektin wurde ('Why I Became an Architect').

== Housing design ==
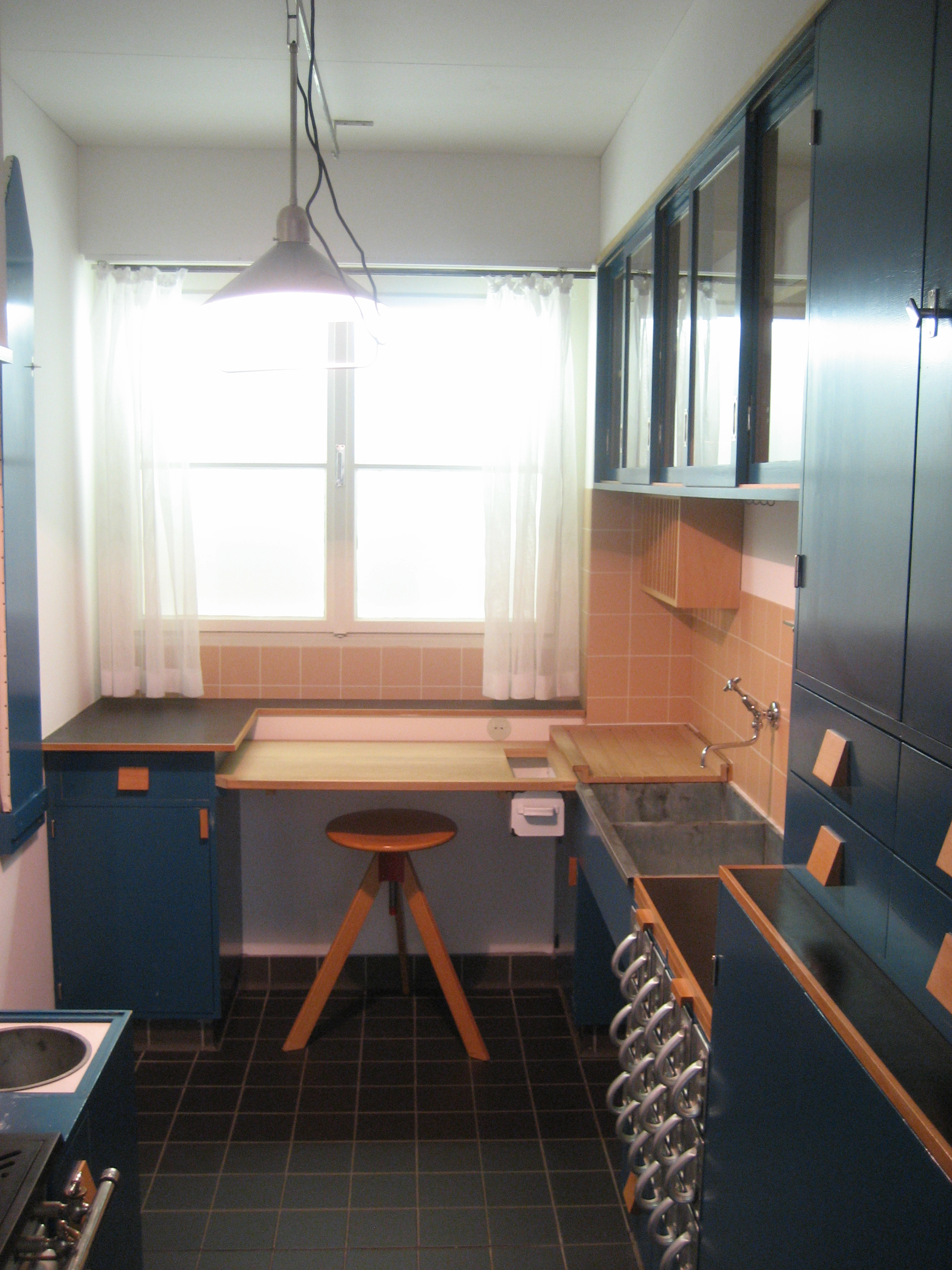
The Frankfurt Kitchen

In 1926 she was called to the Hochbauamt of the City Council of Frankfurt am Main, Germany, by the architect and city planner Ernst May where she worked on the New Frankfurt project. May had been given the political power and financial resources to solve Frankfurt's housing shortage. He and Schütte-Lihotzky, together with the rest of May's assembled architectural staff, successfully brought functional clarity and humanitarian values to thousands of the city's housing units.

Lihotzky continued her work by designing kindergartens, students' homes, schools and similar community buildings. Schütte-Lihotzky designed kindergarten pavilions based on the ideas of Maria Montessori. In Frankfurt she met colleague Wilhelm Schütte, whom she married the following year.

=== Frankfurt kitchen ===
As part of the New Frankfurt-project Lihotzky created the Frankfurt Kitchen in 1926, which was the prototype of the built-in kitchen now prevalent in the Western world. Based on scientific research by U.S. management expert Frederick Winslow Taylor and her own research, Lihotzky used a railroad dining car kitchen as her model to design a "housewife's laboratory" using a minimum of space but offering a maximum of comfort and equipment. The kitchen measured just 1.9 x 3.4 meters. Kitchen surfaces were painted blue-green as scientists claimed the color repelled flies. The Frankfurt City Council eventually installed 10,000 of her mass-produced, prefabricated kitchens in newly-built working-class apartments.

On her 100th birthday Schütte-Lihotzky commented "You'll be surprised that, before I conceived the Frankfurt Kitchen in 1926, I never cooked myself. At home in Vienna my mother cooked, in Frankfurt I went to the Wirthaus [restaurant-pub]. I designed the kitchen as an architect, not as a housewife."

In September 2024, in central Vienna, a 1970s version of the Frankfurt kitchen, restored by architect Renate Allmayer-Beck on the basis of Schütte-Lihotzky's original plans and photos, was opened to the public.

== Wartime activities ==
As the political situation in the Weimar Republic deteriorated and shifted to the political right, Schütte-Lihotzky joined a team of seventeen architects, the "May Brigade", led by architect Ernst May and including her husband and Erich Mauthner, also from Vienna. In 1930 they travelled to Moscow by train. There the group was commissioned to help realize the first of Stalin's five-year plans by building the industrial city of Magnitogorsk in the southern Ural Mountains. On their arrival, the city consisted of mud huts and barracks. It was to have 200,000 inhabitants in a few years' time, the majority the populace working in the steel industry. Although the May Brigade was credited with the construction of 20 cities in three years, political conditions were bad and the results mixed. May left Russia in 1933 when his contract was up.

With the exception of brief business trips and lecture tours to Japan and China, Schütte-Lihotzky remained in the Soviet Union until 1937. She and her husband moved first to London and later to Paris. Also, in 1933 Schütte-Lihotzky had presented some of her work at the Chicago world's fair, "Century of Progress".

In 1938 Schütte-Lihotzky, together with her husband, was called to Istanbul, Turkey, to teach at the Academy of Fine Arts, and to reunite with exiled German architect Bruno Taut. (Unfortunately Taut died soon after their arrival.) On the eve of World War II Istanbul was a haven for exiled Europeans, a common destination for exiled Germans, and the Schüttes encountered artists such as the musicians Béla Bartók and Paul Hindemith.

In Istanbul Schütte-Lihotzky met fellow Austrian Herbert Eichholzer, an architect who at the time was busy organizing Communist resistance to the Nazi regime. In 1939 Schütte-Lihotzky joined the Austrian Communist Party (KPÖ) and in December 1940, of her own free will, together with Eichholzer, travelled back to Vienna to secretly contact the Austrian communist resistance movement. Schütte-Lihotzky agreed to meet a leading Resistance member nicknamed "Gerber", Erwin Puschmann, and help set up a communications line with Istanbul. She met "Gerber" at the Cafe Viktoria on 22 January 1941, where they were surprised and arrested by the Gestapo, only 25 days after her arrival. While Eichholzer and other resistance fighters, who had also been seized, were charged with high treason, sentenced to death by the Volksgerichtshof and executed in 1943, Schütte-Lihotzky was sentenced to 15 years of imprisonment and taken to a prison in Aichach, Bavaria. She was liberated by U.S. troops on 29 April 1945.

== Post-war ==
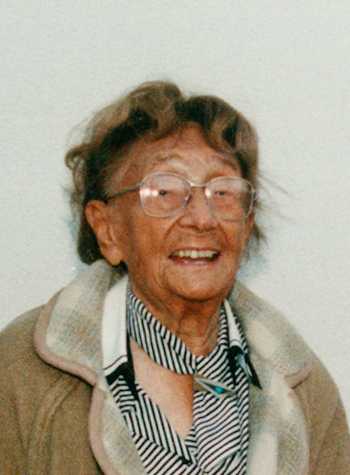
Margarete Schütte-Lihotzky at age 100 in 1997

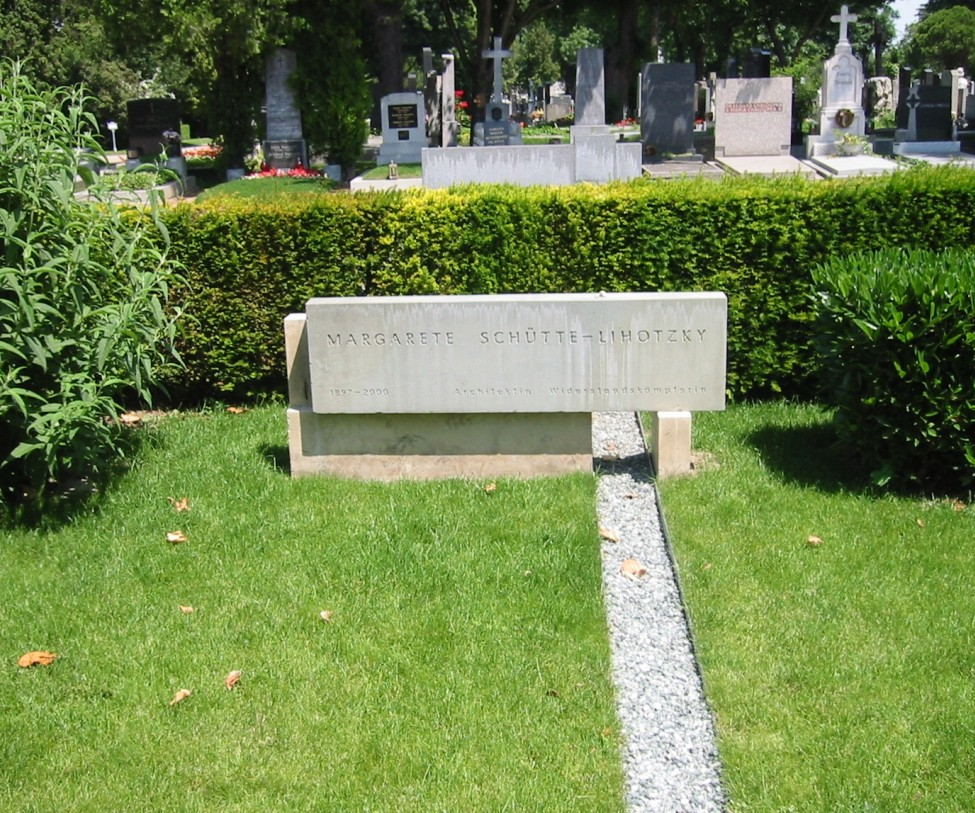
Grave of honour in the Vienna Central Cemetery

In 1945, after the war had ended, she moved to Sofia, Bulgaria, where she came up with the Kindergarten System, a modular architectural system of plans she designed for the municipality. Positing that the advancement of women would benefit society at large, she wrote of her Kindergarten System in Sofia, "The growing percentage of the Bulgarian women in production and in all sectors of the public life of the country will make the establishment of children’s institutions increasingly important in the coming years." It was also during this time that she was able to reunite with her husband, Wilhelm Schütte, after being imprisoned for more than four years for her participation in the Communist Resistance against the Nazi regime.

Margarete Schütte-Lihotsky eventually returned to her native Vienna in 1947. Her strong political views – she remained a communist – prevented her from receiving any major public commissions in post-war Austria, despite the fact that innumerable buildings had been destroyed and had to be rebuilt (Wiederaufbau). Consequently, apart from designing some private homes, Schütte-Lihotzky worked as a consultant in China, Cuba, and the German Democratic Republic. In 1951 she separated from her husband, Wilhelm Schütte.

Belatedly, her accomplishments were officially recognized in Austria. She was first recognised for her non-architecture activities: in 1977 she received a medal for her peace work and, in 1978, an honour badge for her work in the Resistance. She received the Architecture Award from the City of Vienna in 1980. In 1985 she published her memoirs, Erinnerungen aus dem Widerstand ('Memories From the Resistance'). She refused to be honoured in 1988 by Austrian Federal President Kurt Waldheim on the grounds of Waldheim's dubious wartime record. She eventually received the award in 1992. In 1995 she was one of a group of Austrian Holocaust survivors who sued Jörg Haider after a debate in the Austrian parliament on bomb attacks on Romanies in which Haider referred to Nazi concentration camps as "prison camps".

In 1990 a scale model of the Frankfurt Kitchen was put on display in the Austrian Museum for Applied Art in Vienna.

She celebrated her 100th birthday in 1997, dancing a short waltz with the Mayor of Vienna and remarking, "I would have enjoyed it, for a change, to design a house for a rich man."

Margarete Schütte-Lihotzky died in Vienna, on 18 January 2000, at the age of 102, five days before her 103rd birthday, of complications after contracting influenza. She was interred in the Vienna Central Cemetery.

In 2009, the Museum of Modern Art added her Frankfurt Kitchen to its collection. It has subsequently been featured in several exhibitions, including Pirouette: Turning Points in Design, a 2025 exhibition featuring "widely recognized design icons [...] highlighting pivotal moments in design history."

== Commemoration ==
The Australian singer, writer, and director Robyn Archer wrote a play based on Schütte-Lihotzky's life. Architektin, featuring Helen Morse, Ksenja Logos, Craig Behenna, Duncan Graham, Antje Guenther, Michael Habib and Nick Pelomis, produced by the State Theatre Company of South Australia, and directed by Adam Cook, opened on 2 September 2008 at the Dunstan Playhouse, Adelaide, South Australia. The song "The Frankfurt Kitchen" by Rotifer is another tribute to her work.

Schütte-Lihotzky was celebrated in an exhibition Cumhuriyet Kadınları Sahneye Çıkıyor: Cevval, Akılcı, Dirençli, Sabırlı ve İnançlı, (Republican Women Take to the Stage: Brave, Rational, Resistant, Patient and Faithful) organised at Goethe-Institut Ankara from 5 December 2023 to 4 February 2024 in honour of the 100th anniversary of the founding of the Republic of Turkey and the 90th anniversary of Turkish women gaining the right to vote. It showcased the lives and careers of six women who were educated in the young Turkish Republic and the Weimar Republic and whose careers made an impact on the world. Alongside Schütte-Lihotzky, the exhibition featured archaeologist Halet Çambel, architect Mualla Eyüboğlu Anhegger, Semiha Berksoy, Turkey's first Muslim opera singer, paediatrician Erna Eckstein Schlossmann and computer scientist Marianne Laqueur.

== Honours and awards ==
- Architecture Award of the City of Vienna (1980)
- Austrian Decoration for Science and Art (1992)
- Grand Decoration of Honour in Gold with Star for Services to the Republic of Austria (1997)

== See also ==
- Sotsgorod: Cities for Utopia
- Women in architecture
