= Eren Eyüboğlu =

Romanian-born Turkish painter, mosaicist (1913–1988)

- Born: Ernestine Leibovici; 5 February 1913; Iași, Romania
- Died: 30 August 1988 (aged 75); Kalamış, Turkey
- Other names: Eren Eyuboglu, Ernestine Eyuboglu
- Education: George Enescu National University of Arts, Académie Julian
- Occupation: Artist
- Spouse: Bedri Rahmi Eyüboğlu (married 1933–1975)

Eren Eyüboğlu (née Ernestine Leibovici; 1913–1988) was a Romanian-born Turkish painter, ceramicist, and mosaic artist. She is considered one of the forerunners of modernism in Turkey.

== Biography ==
Ernestine Leibovici was born on 5 February 1913 in Iași, Romania. She attended George Enescu National University of Arts (formerly Academy of Fine Arts Iași), where she graduated in 1928. From 1930 to 1932, she continued her education at Andre Lhote's studio (also known as Academy André Lhote) in Paris and Académie Julian. In 1933, she studied art in Istanbul.

In 1933, she married artist Bedri Rahmi Eyüboğlu, whom she met at Andre Lhote's studio. When she married, Ernestine adopted the Turkish name “Eren”. Bedri would go on to have an affair with artist Mari Gerekmezyan in the 1940s, which put a strain on their marriage.

Eyüboğlu worked in many different mediums, including ceramic, charcoal, oil, watercolor, and gouache. She took part in D Group exhibitions starting in 1936, as well as the Edinburgh Art Festival in 1957, and the Hamburg Turkish Women Painters Exhibition in 1958. In 1941, she had her first solo exhibition.

== Death and legacy ==
She died on 30 August 1988 in Kalamış, Turkey. Her work is in museum collections, including at Grey Art Gallery, and Istanbul Museum of Modern Art.

In 2020, her work was part of the exhibition, “Modernisms: Iranian, Turkish and Indian Highlights from NYU’s Abby Grey Collection” at the Block Museum of Art at Northwestern University.
