= Group D (FIA) =

In motorsport, Group D is for international formula racing cars classified by the Fédération Internationale de l'Automobile in Appendix J of its International Sporting Code. The group was first described in Article 251 "Classification and Definitions", in 1982 along with the simultaneous introduction of Groups N, A, B, C and E. Group D was placed in Category II for Competition Cars, cars that were single builds for racing purposes only. The Group continued to be defined in new publications of Appendix J Article 251, usually annually, until 2019. Although Appendix J does define Formula 2 and Formula 3 as "international formulae", neither have ever been explicitly defined as being in or consisting of Group D in their respective technical or specific regulations. Further, Group D is not mentioned anywhere else in the International Sporting Code or its appendices other than the initial classification and definition in Article 251.

== See also ==
- Formula Two
- Formula Three
- Formula 3000
- Group N
- Group A
- Group B
- Group C
- Group E
