= Aslantepe Tumulus =

Ancient tumulus in Turkey

Coordinates: 38°22′55″N 38°02′39″E

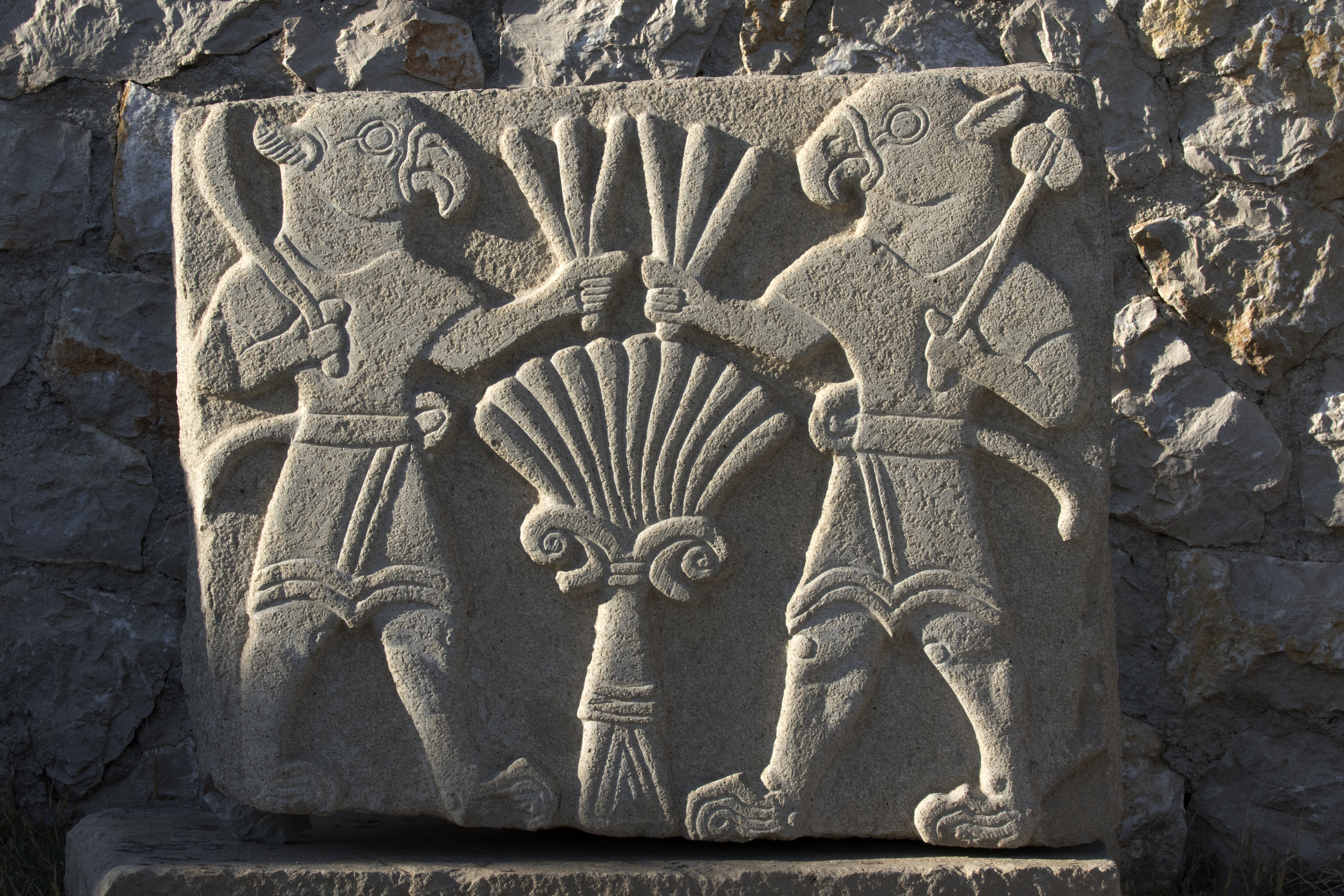
Carving of "Two lionmen" (1,200 BCE) at the entrance of Aslantepe ruins area in Battalgazi, Malatya, Turkey

Aslantepe Tumulus (Turkish: Aslantepe Höyüğü), also spelled as Arslantepe, is a 5,000 year-old tumulus located in Malatya Province, Eastern Anatolia region of Turkey. The unearthed king's palace is an open-air museum, while the artifacts are exhibited in Malatya Museum.

Aslantepe Tumulus is located near Orduzu village of Battalgazi district, 7 km (4.3 mi) northeast of Malatya. It dates back to Chalcolithic period and late Hittite period. Excavations started in 1932, and carried out by Italian archaeologists.

Importance of Aslantepe Tumulus in Terms of Dimesions of:

State Formation

Arslantepe is considered one of the earliest examples of a centralized political system. Excavations have revealed a large monumental building complex interpreted as a palace, suggesting the presence of a ruling authority and a hierarchical social structure. This development marks a transition from egalitarian village societies to stratified communities governed by an elite class.

The site is often cited in discussions of early state formation due to its evidence of centralized decision-making and institutionalized authority.

Public Administration and Bureaucracy

Arslantepe provides early evidence of administrative practices. Archaeological findings include seal impressions, storage facilities, and accounting-related artifacts. These indicate the existence of systems used to control and monitor the movement of goods.

The use of seals suggests mechanisms for authorization and control, representing early forms of bureaucratic governance. These practices are interpreted as precursors to later administrative systems in more complex state societies.

Legal Authority and Institutional Control

Although no formal written legal codes have been identified at Arslantepe, the presence of standardized administrative tools such as seals implies regulated economic and social interactions. These tools likely functioned as markers of authority, ownership, and legitimacy.

Such evidence points to the emergence of institutional control mechanisms, which are considered foundational elements in the development of legal systems.

Military Organization

Among the notable discoveries at Arslantepe are some of the earliest known metal swords, dating to the late 4th millennium BCE. These artifacts suggest the existence of organized conflict and possibly specialized warrior groups.

The concentration of weapons in a central context has been interpreted as evidence of controlled or institutionalized use of force, a characteristic often associated with early state structures.

Economic Organization and Redistribution

The site contains extensive storage facilities that appear to have been used for the collection and redistribution of agricultural products. This indicates a centralized economic system in which resources were gathered and managed by an administrative authority.

Such a redistributive economy is considered a key feature of early complex societies and proto-state formations.

Architectural and Spatial Organization

The monumental architecture at Arslantepe, particularly the palace complex, demonstrates an advanced level of spatial organization. The integration of administrative, storage, and ceremonial functions within a single architectural complex indicates a coordinated and multifunctional use of space.

This type of architectural planning is considered an important development in the evolution of urban and administrative centers.

Regional and Cultural Significance

Arslantepe is situated at a crossroads between Mesopotamia and Anatolia, and it played a role in the transmission of cultural and technological innovations between these regions. The site reflects both local developments and broader regional interactions.

It is therefore regarded as a key location for understanding the spread of early state-level societies and administrative practices.

Contribution to Contemporary Malatya

Arslantepe Tumulus continues to play a significant role in the cultural, economic, and symbolic landscape of present-day Malatya. Inscribed on the UNESCO World Heritage List in 2021, the site has contributed to increased international recognition of the region and has supported the development of cultural tourism.

The archaeological heritage of Arslantepe is also reflected in local identity and educational initiatives. It serves as a reference point for historical continuity, linking modern Malatya to early forms of social organization and state development. Museums, exhibitions, and academic collaborations related to the site have further strengthened its role in public awareness and cultural preservation.

In addition, Arslantepe has influenced regional branding and cultural narratives, often being associated with themes such as early civilization, governance, and innovation. These associations contribute to Malatya’s positioning within both national and international contexts as a historically significant center.

== See also ==
- Melid
