= Bedri Rahmi Eyüboğlu =

Turkist painter and poet (1911–1975)

- Born: Mehmet Bedri Rahmi; 1911; Görele, Giresun Province, Ottoman Empire
- Died: 21 September 1975 (aged 63–64); Istanbul, Turkey
- Resting place: Küçükyalı Cemetery, Küçükyalı, Istanbul, Turkey
- Education: Mimar Sinan Fine Arts University
- Occupations: Painter, poet
- Spouse: Ernestine Leibovici (married 1933–1975)
- Partner: Mari Gerekmezyan (1940s)
- Relatives: Sabahattin Eyüboğlu (brother); Mualla Eyüboğlu (sister); Ezgi Eyüboğlu

Bedri Rahmi Eyüboğlu (1911 – 21 September 1975) was a Turkish painter, mosaic-maker, muralist, writer and poet. His art work was inspired by Anatolian village scenes and folk literature, and included traditional handicraft folk patterns.

== Early life ==
Bedri Rahmi Eyüboğlu was born in 1911 in Görele on the Black Sea, the second child in a family with five. His elder brother, Sabahattin Eyüboğlu, was a well-known writer and his younger sister, Mualla Eyüboğlu, was one of the first architects working in restoration and well known for her work on the Harem section of Topkapı Palace in Istanbul. Due to his father Mehmet Rahmi later Eyüboğlu's position as the Governor of Trabzon, Eyüboğlu lived in various parts of Turkey before attending high school in Trabzon. In 1928, he started to write poetry. His father later became a member of parliament chosen by Mustafa Kemal Atatürk.

In 1929, he moved to Istanbul to enter the Mimar Sinan Fine Arts University (formerly Academy of Fine Arts, Istanbul). In 1931 he left the Academy temporarily to go to France with his brother, studying French first in Dijon and then in Lyon. He then studied at the Andre Lohte's studio in Paris, where he met his future wife, Eren Eyüboğlu (née Ernestine Leibovici). They were married 1933. Eren organized his first one-man show at the Hasefer Gallery in Bucharest in 1935.

Back in Turkey, he completed his studies and obtained his diploma in 1936. In 1937, he entered the Academy as an assistant and translator of Léopold Lévy. He remained at the Academy until his death in 1975. He was sent by the government to work in Edirne in 1938 and then in Çorum and Iskilip in 1942, a period that marked a turning point in his artistic career.

== Career and mid-life ==
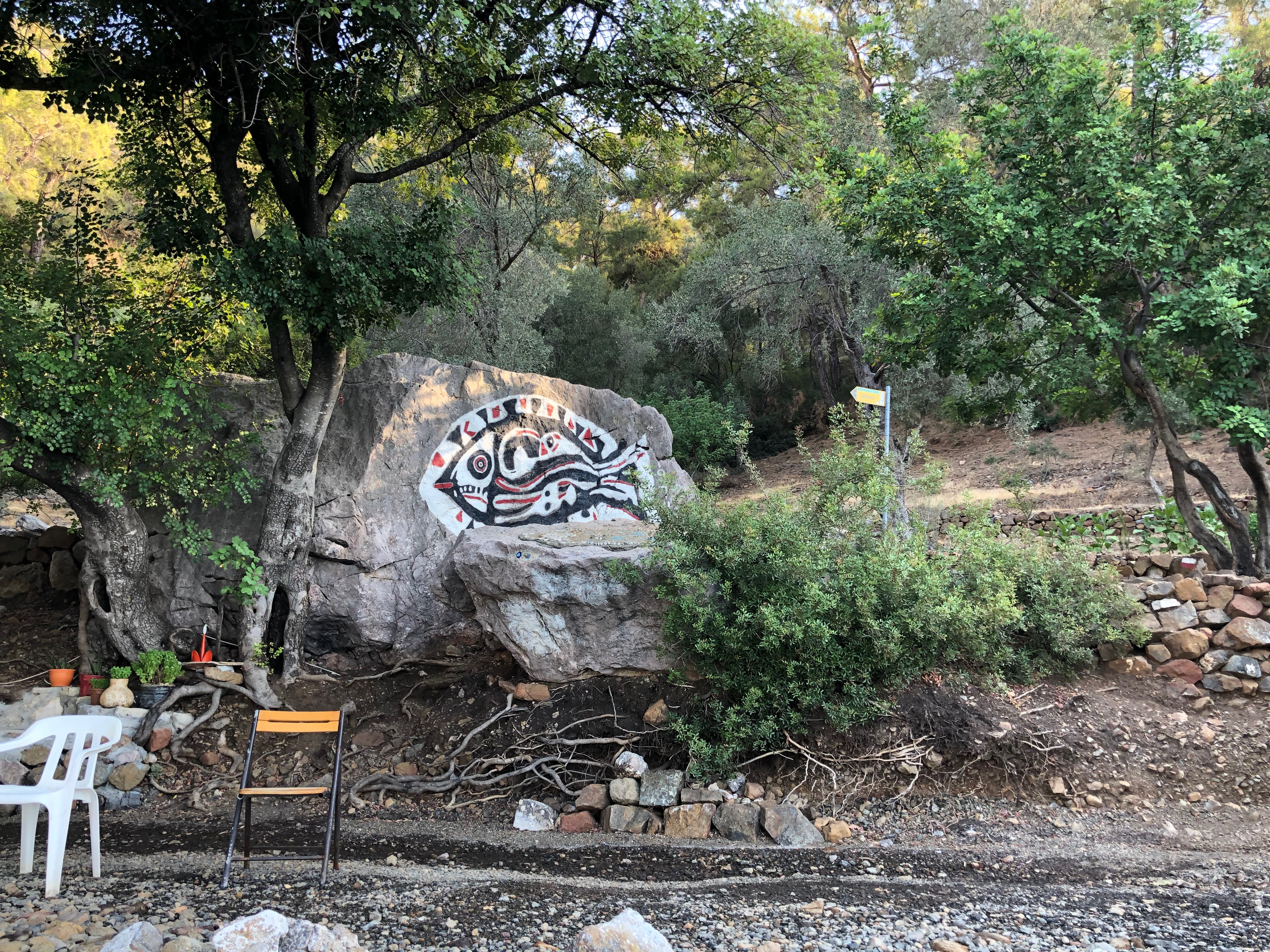
Eyüboğlu's Fish mural on a rock, at Bedri Rahmi Bay in Göcek, Fethiye

Eyüboğlu exhibited with the D Group of painters starting in 1936, and founded the Group of 10 for young painters. Impressed by the Musée de l'Homme's exhibition of African art on a second trip to Paris, he started using woodblock printing in order to allow more people to see his work.

He had an affair with artist Mari Gerekmezyan, while still he was married. Throughout the 1940s, Gerekmezyan assisted Bedri Rahmi Eyüboğlu in his artwork. Gerekmezyan died in 1947.

Eyüboğlu was a prolific artist, both on canvas and in mosaic form. Early works include the frescoes he painted for the Lido Restaurant in Istanbul in 1943, and a large panel he designed for the Ankara Opera House in 1946. Various Eyüboğlu mosaic panels can be seen in Istanbul, for example in the İMC complex off Atatürk Bulvarı and in 4.Levent. He also prepared a panel of 250 m^{2} (2,700 sq ft) for the Brussels Fair in 1958, which was awarded first prize. In 1960, he made a panel for NATO headquarters in Paris, which was transferred to the headquarters in Brussels when France left NATO.

He completed a stained glass window composition at the Embassy of Turkey in Bonn, Germany.

In 1960, he was invited to the United States on a Rockefeller and a Ford Foundation grant. Eyüboğlu was also guest professor at the University of California, Berkeley. Eyüboğlu taught at Mimar Sinan Fine Arts University, until his death. Notable students of his include İbrahim Çallı.

== List of mosaic mural works ==
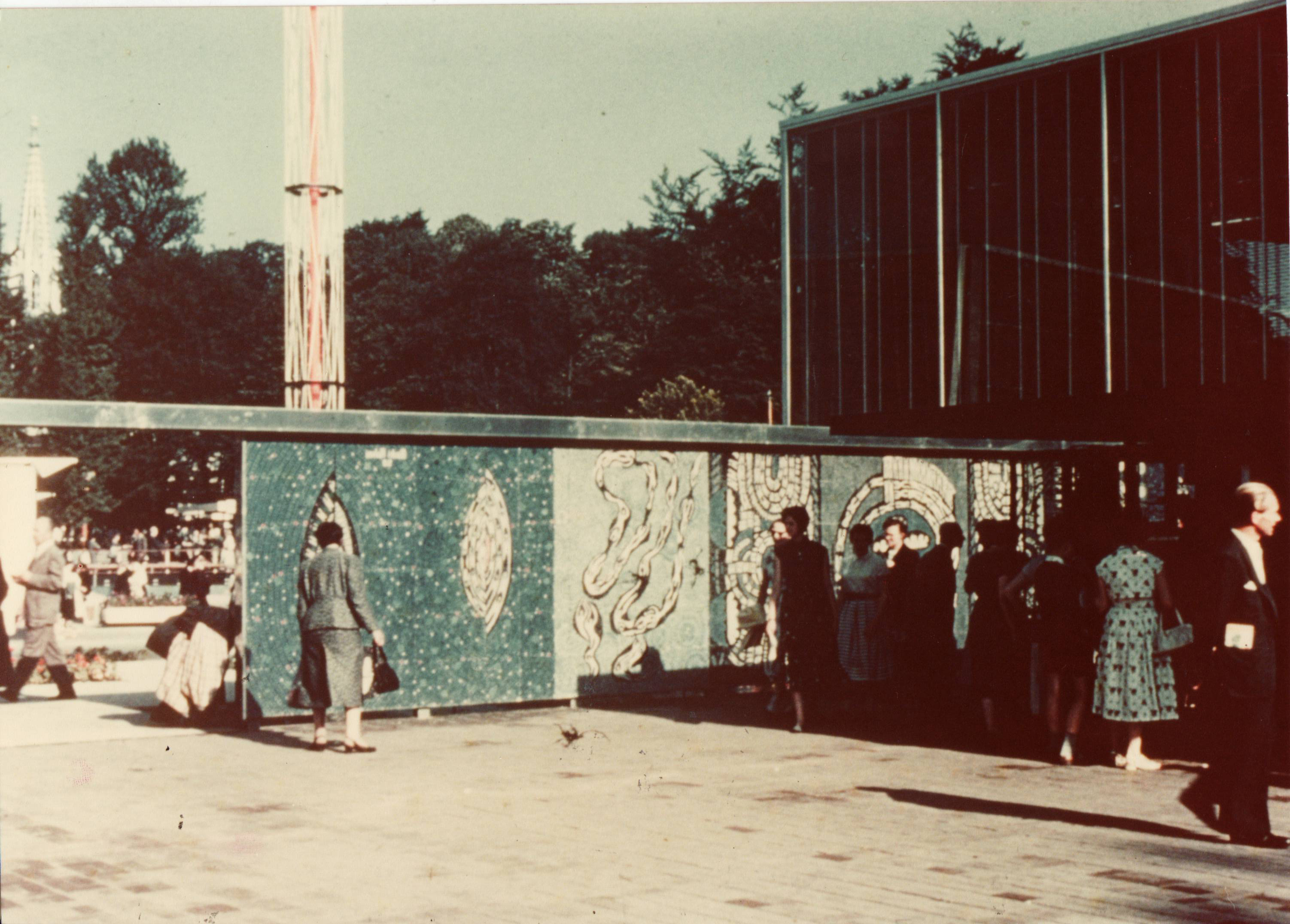
Turkish Pavilion for Expo 58 Brussels

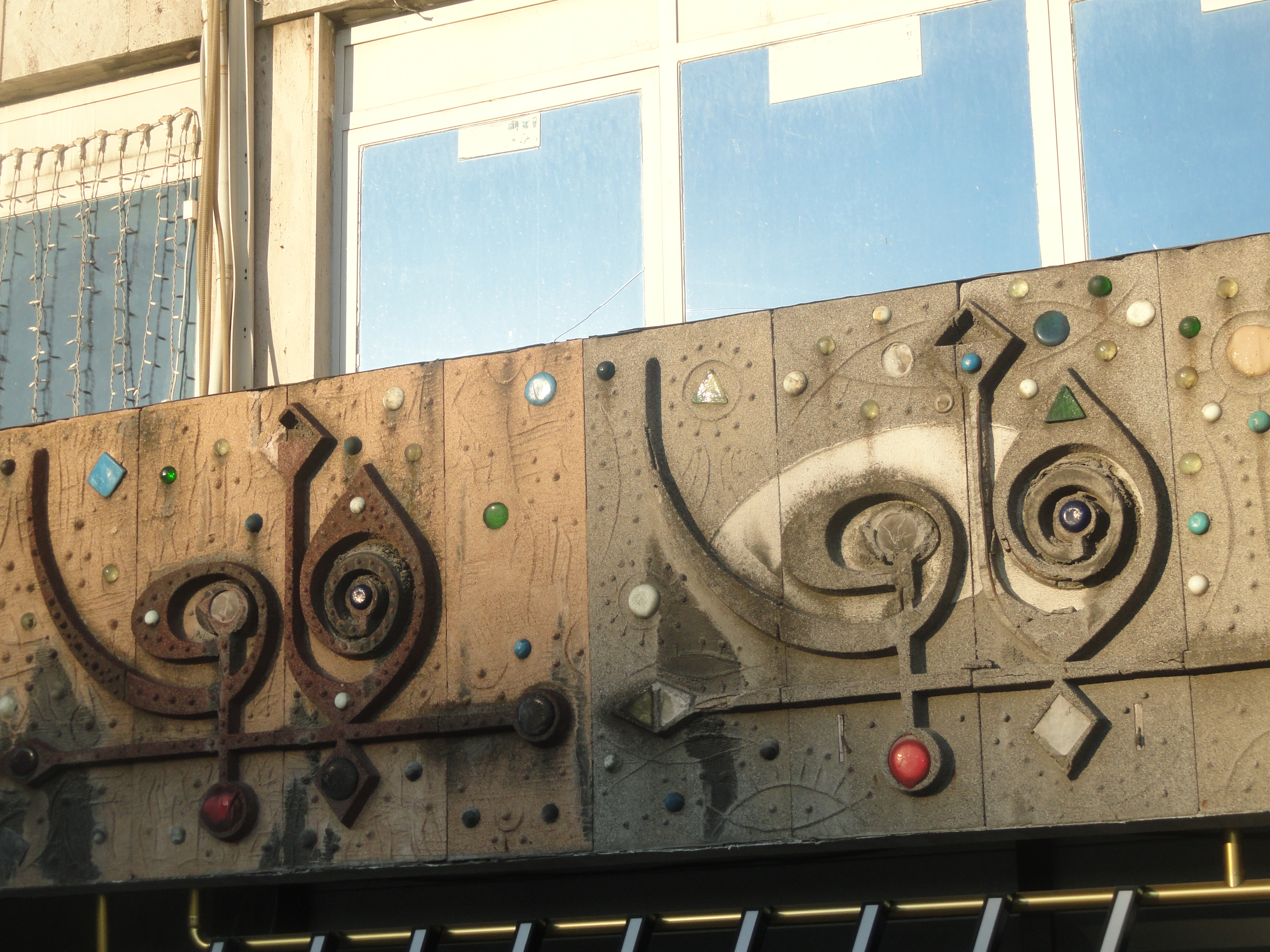
Karaköy Tatlıcılar Rölyefi (Karaköy Confectioners' Relief)

- Ankara Opera House (1946),
- Ankara Etibank (1953),
- 4th Levent neighborhood, Istanbul, residential walls (1956–1957),
- Hacettepe University Children's Hospital (1955),
- Hacettepe Hospital (1954–1955),
- Expo 58, a world fair in Brussels, mosaics for the Turkish Pavilion (1958),
- Istanbul Manifaturacılar Sitesi (Draftsmen Site) mosaic panels (1963–1965),
- Istanbul University-Cerrahpaşa (1978),
- Haydarpaşa Chest Diseases Hospital (1979).

== Written works ==
Beside his artistic work, Bedri Rahmi was also a writer whose work appeared in various literary reviews, including Yeni Adam magazine, and the newspaper Cumhuriyet where he had a weekly art column from 1952 to 1958. His first published poem, Yaradana Mektup (Letter to the Creator), was published in 1941. His second book Karadut (Black Mulberry) was published in 1948. One of his best known poems if The Saga of Istanbul (Istanbul Destanı).

Other poetry books are as follows:

- Tuz 1952
- Üçü Birden, 1953
- Dördü Birden, 1956
- Karadut 69, 1969
- Dol Karabakır Dol, 1974
- Yaşadım, 1977
- Tezek

== Death and legacy ==
Eyüboğlu died on 21 September 1975 from pancreatic cancer. He was laid to rest in the Küçükyalı Cemetery in Istanbul.

His work can be seen in the Istanbul Modern art gallery in Galataport, and in various museums in the United States and Europe including Grey Art Gallery.

Posthumously in 1976, Eyüboğlu was selected as "artist of the year" by Milliyet newspaper.
