= Saint Petersburg University of Economics, Culture and Business Administration =

Saint Petersburg University of Economics, Culture and Business Administration (Санкт-Петербургский Институт Экономики, Культуры и Делового Администрирования Sankt Peterburgskiy institut ekonomiki kultury i delovogo administrirovaniya), is a private institution of higher education in Saint Petersburg, Russia. The university was established in 1999. It has two faculties - the Faculty of Arts and the Faculty of Management.
