= Adalah-NY =

American organization advocating boycotts of Israel

Adalah-NY: The New York Campaign for the Boycott of Israel
- Founded: August 2006
- Type: Campaign group
- Region served: New York City
- Website: adalahny.org
- Formerly called: Ad-Hoc Coalition for Justice in the Middle East

Adalah-NY: The New York Campaign for the Boycott of Israel is a New York-based organization that campaigns for Boycott, Divestment and Sanctions (BDS) against Israel. "Adalah" is the Arabic word for "justice."

== Origins ==
Founded in August 2006 as the Ad-Hoc Coalition for Justice in the Middle East, the organization was established in response to the escalation of Israeli attacks on the Gaza Strip and the Israeli war on Lebanon. It later changed its name to Adalah-NY: The Coalition for Justice in the Middle East.

In February 2010, Adalah-NY merged with the New York Campaign for the Boycott of Israel (NYCBI). The latter group was established in response to Israel's Operation Cast Lead, which took place in December 2008 and January 2009. NYCBI's founders were activists from various organizations who came together to support the boycott, divestment, and sanctions movement. In March 2009, NYCBI launched a boycott campaign against Motorola, which develops products for the Israeli Army. Adalah-NY founder Riham Barghouti explained, “This merger will allow boycott, divestment, and sanctions (BDS) activists in New York City to combine their resources and work more effectively at promoting BDS in New York, the US, and worldwide.”

Following the merger, the organization’s name changed from Adalah-NY: The Coalition for Justice in the Middle East to Adalah-NY: The New York Campaign for the Boycott of Israel.

== Views ==
Adalah-NY describes itself as “a local, grassroots, non-hierarchical volunteer-only group of concerned individuals that advocates for justice, equality, and human rights for the Palestinian people through educational activities and campaign-building. Adalah-NY organizes in support of the 2005 call by Palestinian civil society organizations to maintain non-violent means of protest -- including boycotts, divestment, and sanctions..."

The organization calls for Israel to meet “its obligation to recognize the Palestinian people's inalienable right to self-determination and fully compl[y] with the precepts of international law by: Ending its occupation and colonization of all Arab lands and dismantling the Wall; Recognizing the fundamental rights of the Arab-Palestinian citizens of Israel to full equality; and Respecting, protecting and promoting the rights of Palestinian refugees to return to their homes and properties as stipulated in UN resolution 194.” It also “affirm[s] the right of all people to resist occupation and oppression.”

Adalah-NY holds the United States responsible for “Israeli aggression,” which it describes as being “inseparably tied to the United States' illegal occupation of Iraq and larger U.S. strategies for hegemony in the region.”

Adalah-NY maintains that Israel practices a policy of apartheid and ethnic cleansing, and describes the West Bank as being “carved into isolated cantons, akin to the Bantustans under South African apartheid, to which Palestinians are confined.” It further holds that Palestinian citizens of Israel are “second-class citizens” who “are systematically discriminated against by Israeli laws, courts, and society.”

In the view of Adalah-NY, “Israeli policy has been the root of violence in the region for 60 years.” When the IDF raided a Gaza tunnel built to kidnap Israeli soldiers, Adalah-NY called the raid “unprovoked.” It employs the slogans “Zionism = racism,” “stop the genocide,” and “Israeli defense forces = war criminals.” Adalah-NY criticized the FBI for issuing subpoenas for persons suspected of supporting terrorist groups.

== Activism ==
Adalah-NY believes that BDS is the “most effective non-violent and morally consistent means for achieving justice and genuine peace in the region....Like the global movement against apartheid in South Africa, the BDS movement takes as its task the organization of grassroots efforts to pressure institutions to hold Israel accountable.”

Adalah-NY has held street protests and organized “cultural events, political forums, and other political events.” In addition, it has participated with other groups in various events, including Israeli Apartheid Week in New York City.

In 2010, Adalah-NY condemned the Arava Institute for Environmental Studies for not focusing on “the fundamental and systematic inequalities that are at the root of the conflict,” and urged such celebrities as Pete Seeger and Mandy Patinkin to bow out of an Arava-sponsored event.

At a 2011 Adalah-NY protest against Point Lookout Capital Partners, which facilitates investment in tear-gas supplier Combined Systems, activists “collapsed motionless on the sidewalk” following a “mock tear-gassing by an actor dressed as an Israeli soldier.”

In 2011 Adalah-NY joined a campaign against the pension fund TIAA-CREF, which had been begun by Jewish Voice for Peace. The campaign “calls for TIAA-CREF to divest from companies supporting and profiting from Israeli apartheid, violations of international law, and human rights abuses, such as Elbit, Caterpillar, Motorola, Northrop Grumman and Veolia.” Adalah-NY led a July 2012 protest against TIAA-CREF.

As part of its cultural boycott, Adalah-NY organized and participated in a 2011 multi-city protest of concerts by India Arie and Idan Raichel. Idan Raichel is an Israeli recording artist famous for his multi-cultural approach, which prominently features voices from Israel’s Ethiopian community.

Also in 2011, Adalah-NY organized a panel for Israeli Apartheid Week featuring Judith Butler and John Greyson. Entitled “How Now? Media, Politics and Queer Activism,” the panel focused on the cultural and academic boycotts and the importance of queer BDS activism in Palestine and elsewhere.

Adalah-NY organized a protest when the Israeli Philharmonic performed in New York City on February 22, 2011. It also helped coordinate protests nationwide at locations where the IPO played.

Adalah-NY posted a YouTube video in 2011 of its activists performing a flash mob at Grand Central Station to Journey’s “Don’t Stop Believin’,” with special lyrics decrying the Israeli Occupation. When the video, which commemorated Palestinian Land Day and called on Americans to boycott Israel, was removed by YouTube on grounds of copyright infringement, Hannah Mermelstein of Adalah-NY said, “We are dismayed that our video has been removed from YouTube and are working to make it available again. We fear that this is but another example of attempts to silence calls for justice and Palestinian rights. But the BDS movement to hold Israel accountable for its crimes against Palestinians will not be silenced.”

It also organized a protest against Israeli Batsheva Dance Company’s March 2012 performance at the Brooklyn Academy of Music. Protesters handed audience members fake programs calling the dance company a “cultural ambassador for Israel.” Earlier, Adalah-NY had written to BAM asking that it cancel Batsheva's performance.

After the 2012 Operation Pillar of Defense, Adalah-NY organized a protest against General Electric, which provides engines for Israeli military aircraft and helicopters. The protest was cosponsored by other groups, including Jewish Voice for Peace-NY, Jews Say No!, NYU Students for Justice in Palestine, and Columbia Students for Justice in Palestine.

In 2012, Adalah-NY “established a dedicated social media team to amplify our presence on Facebook and Twitter.” It also organized “teach-ins,” one of them, on July 15, with Havaar, an Iranian organization that opposes both Iranian state repression and U.S. sanctions against Iran.

== Campaign against Lev Leviev ==
Adalah-NY has especially targeted Israeli jeweler Lev Leviev, chairman of the conglomerate Africa Israel Investments, whose Danya Cebus division is involved in constructing West Bank settlements. Adalah-NY considers him guilty of stealing Palestinian land. According to Adalah-NY, it “began its campaign against the Israeli diamond magnate and settlement builder Lev Leviev in 2007. Adalah-NY says that this campaign has had a number of successes, with governments, investment banks, celebrities, and international aid agencies distancing themselves from Leviev and his company Africa-Israel.”

According to Adalah-NY, as a result of pressure by Jews against the Occupation-NYC and Adalah-NY, several celebrities, including Salma Hayek, Halle Berry, Drew Barrymore, Brooke Shields, Andie MacDowell, Lucy Liu, Whitney Houston, and Sharon Stone, asked in 2008 that their pictures be removed from Leviev's website, on which they were depicted wearing Leviev jewelry.

When charity confederation Oxfam was announced in 2008 as the beneficiary of a donation by photographer Timothy White, whose use of borrowed Leviev diamonds in a photo shoot had led Leviev to describe himself as an Oxfam supporter, Adalah-NY pressured Oxfam to publicly distance itself from Leviev. Oxfam accordingly issued a statement to the effect that “Leviev...is not an Oxfam supporter or partner and may not claim to be one....we are not and never will be partners or beneficiaries of Leviev.”

Also in response to pressure from Adalah-NY, UNICEF decided in 2008 to refuse contributions from Leviev, who had contributed to UNICEF and sponsored at least one UNICEF fundraiser. “I can confirm that UNICEF has advised Adalah in New York that it will not be entering into any partnerships or accepting financial contributions from Lev Leviev or his corporate people,” Chris de Bono, a senior adviser to the executive director of UNICEF, said.

Richard A. Marin, a 25-year trustee of CARE USA, was forced in 2010 to leave the board following a campaign by Adalah-NY. Marin was chief executive of Africa Israel Investments USA, a subsidiary of Africa Israel Investments, which, according to a CARE statement, was “connected to building settlements in the West Bank in violation of international law.” Marin protested that he had no influence on the activities of Africa Israel Investments.

In November 2010, Leviev succumbed to Adalah-NY's pressure, and Africa Israel announced that it was suspending construction projects in the West Bank.

Still, Adalah-NY continued to focus on Leviev. In 2011,” according to Adalah-NY, “we continued to place pressure on Leviev to end his settlement construction activities in the Occupied Palestinian Territories, with a focus on Leviev’s Leader Management and Development’s continued settlement construction on the lands of Jayyous.”

In 2011, Adalah-NY sent a letter, along with two other groups, to the Breast Cancer Research Foundation, urging the charity to “to return all funds received from [Leviev's] LVD Foundation and sever any ties to the Foundation and Lev Leviev.”

In June 2012, Adalah-NY released photos indicating that Africa Israel was involved in building projects in Gilo, a neighborhood in Jerusalem. Whether or not it is a “settlement” is a matter of debate, as the neighborhood is wholly contained in the Jerusalem municipality.

== Caroling ==
The group is especially known for organizing protests at Christmas time in which the participants sing parodies of Christmas and Hannukah carols. In December 2012, the sixth time that Adalah-NY arranged the annual event, eighty carolers sang in front of a Madison Avenue jewelry store owned by Leviev. The parody songs included “Buy Yourself a Merry Little Tchotchke,” “Leviev the Two-Faced Magnate,” and “Whitewashing,” set to the tune of “White Christmas.”

== Praise from Mondoweiss ==
In 2010, Rebecca Vilkomerson, Executive Director of the organization Jewish Voice for Peace, nominated Adalah-NY for the Mondo Awards, presented by the Mondoweiss website to activists focusing on the Israeli-Palestinian conflict.

== Funding ==
It declares on its website that its “financial sponsor” is Wespac, a 501 (c) (3) organization that is based in Westchester County, New York, and that also financially sponsors Israeli Apartheid Week. Adalah-NY posts annual program and financial reports on its website. Because Wespac claims tax exemption as an education sponsor but finances political activism, some have questioned the legality of its filings. Wespac is led by Nada Khader, a Palestinian woman who has been living in the U.S. since childhood. A frequent speaker at campuses across the U.S., she has accused Hollywood of making “over 700” films “that portray my [Arab] community in a derogatory manner....Why? To justify American policy in our region [the Middle East].”
