= Mesir macunu =

Traditional Turkish sweet

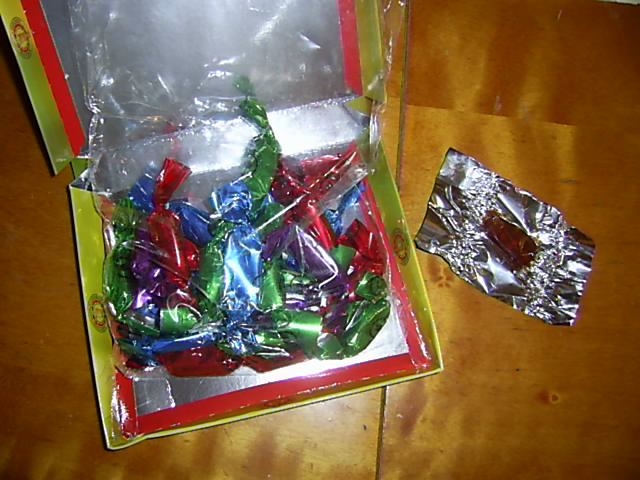
- Type: Sweet
- Place of origin: Manisa, Turkey
- Associated cuisine: Turkish
- Main ingredients: Toffee paste

Mesir Macunu Festival
- UNESCO Intangible Cultural Heritage
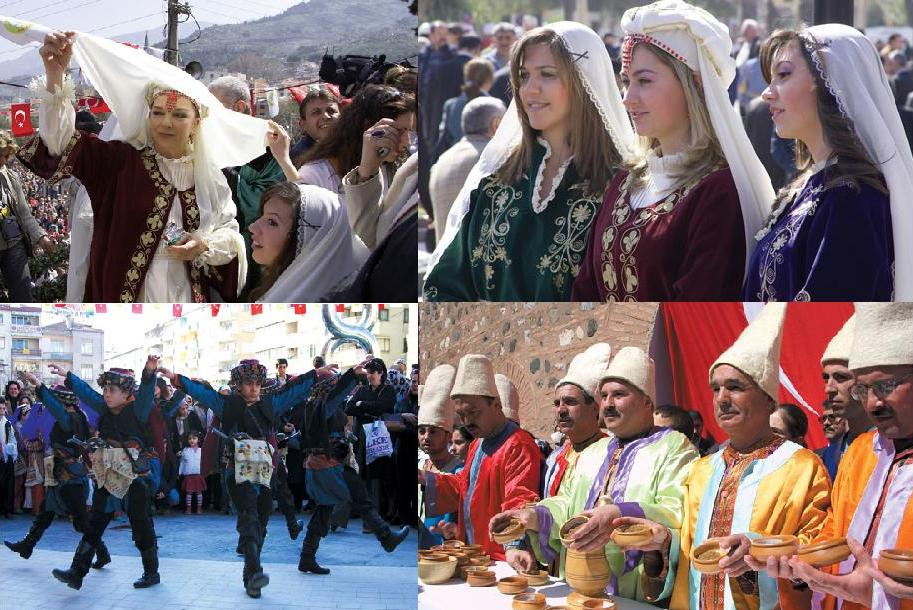
- 2010 Mesir Macunu Festival in Manisa, Turkey
- Country: Turkey
- Reference: 00642
- Region: Europe and North America

Inscription history
- Inscription: 2012 (7th session)
- List: Representative

Mesir Macunu (Turkish pronunciation: [mesiɾ̥ maːd͡ʒunʊ]) is a traditional Turkish sweet associated with the city of Manisa, which holds a yearly festival to celebrate it. It consists of sugar (or honey), water, organic acid, and a blend of dozens of spices. Earlier versions of Mesir macunu were likely less sweet and more spicy in flavor.

== Variants and related confections ==
Macun is a sweet Turkish confectionery toffee-like paste that originated from spicy preparations of Mesir macunu.

== Herbs and spices used ==
The original Manisa Mesir Macunu recipe is often cited to contain 41 ingredients. The specific ingredients are not documented but modern Manisa Mesir Macunu is made with 31 ingredients due to unavailability of some of the original ingredients and the banning of others that were found to be harmful by the Turkish Ministry of Agriculture. The number 41 holds symbolic significance for Islam. Therefore, modern producers may try to mimic that number but often include ingredients that would not have been available in Turkey in the 16th century—including New World spices like vanilla and allspice.

Below is an example of a typical list of spices and herbs used in making modern Mesir Paste, along with their Turkish and Latin names:

- Allspice (Yeni bahar) (Pimenta dioica)
- Anise (Anason) (Anisum vulgare)
- Black cumin (Çörek otu) (Nigella sativa)
- Black Myrobalan (Kara halile) (Terminalia nigra)
- Black pepper (Karabiber) (Piper nigrum)
- Buckthorn (Topalak or Akdiken) (Nerprun alaterne)
- Cardamon (Kakule) (Elettaria cardamomum)
- Cassia (Hiyarsenbe) (Cassia)
- Chebulic myrobalan (Kara halile) (Terminalia chebula)
- China root (Cop-i cini) (Smilax china)
- Cinnamon (Tarçın) (Cinnamomum verum)
- Cloves (Karanfil) (Syzygium aromaticum)
- Coconut (Hindistan cevizi) (Cocos nucifera)
- Coriander (Kişniş) (Coriandum sativum)
- Cubeb (Kebabe) (Cubebae fructus)
- Cumin (Kimyon) (Cuminum cyminum)
- Dried orange blossom (Portakal çiçeği)
- Fennel (Rezene) (Foeniculum vulgare)
- Galingale (Havlıcan) (Alpinia officinarum)
- Galangal root (Havlıcan kökü) (Alpina officinarium)
- Ginger (Zencefil) (Zingibar officinalis)
- Iksir sugar (Iksir şekeri)
- India blossom (Hindistan çiceği)
- Java Pepper (Kuyruklu biber) (Piper cubeba)
- Licorice extract (Meyan balı) (Glycyrrhiza uralensis fisch)
- Licorice root (Meyan kökü) (Glycyrrhiza glabra)
- Mastic (Çam sakızı) (Mastichum)
- Millet (Hintdarisi) (Pennisetum glaucum)
- Myrrh (Murrusafi) (Commiphora Molmol)
- Muskroot (Sümbül) (Adoxa moschatellina)
- Mustard seed (Hardal tohumu) (Brassica nigra)
- Orange peel (Portakal kabugu)
- Rhubarb (Ravend) (Rheum Palmatum)
- Saffron (Safran) (Crocus Orientalis)
- Citric acid (Limon tuzu)
- Senna (Sinameki) (Cassia senna)
- Turmeric (Zerdeçal) (Curcuma domestica)
- Udulkahr (Udulkahir) (Anacyclus pyrethrum)
- Vanilla (Vanilya) (Vanilla planifolia)
- Woad (Çivit) (Isatis)
- Yellow myrobalan (Sarı halile) (Fructus myrobalani)

Manisa Mesir Macunu also includes Darül Fülful (Piper longum), Galanga (Alpinia galanga), lemon peel, yellow myrobalan (Terminalia citrina), Dame D'onze Heures (Ornithogalum umbellatum), Theriac (Antidatodum midridaticum), and Zedoary (Curcuma zedaariae).

== See also ==
- List of Turkish desserts
- Macun
