= Marianne Laqueur =

German computer scientist (1918–2006)

- Born: 11 June 1918; Berlin
- Died: 5 April 2006 (aged 87); Wiesbaden
- Known for: computer scientist, politician

Marianne Laqueur (11 June 1918 - 5 April 2006) was a German Jewish refugee to Turkey, a computer scientist and local politician.

== Early life ==
Marianne Laqueur was born on 11 June 1918 in Berlin, the daughter of August (b. 1885) and Ilse Laqueur (née Netto).

Her father was a director level doctor and physiotherapist at the Rudolf Virchow Hospital in Berlin. In 1935, August Laqueur was forcibly retired under the terms of the 1933 Berufsbeamtengesetz (BBG) act, part of the Nazis persecution of those with Jewish ancestry, the first anti-Semitic law passed in Germany since 1871. Laqueur's parents emigrated to Turkey with Marianne and lived and worked in Ankara. Her father became the head of the physiotherapy department there at the Numune Hospital, and was initially granted a 5 year contract in 1935. The family were part of the Haymatloz, a phrase used in Turkish alien passports of c. 1000 German-speaking refugees, many with Jewish ancestry, who emigrated to Attaturk's Turkey between 1933 and 1945 during the Third Reich. It is a Turkish transliteration of “heimatlos”, which means homeless or uprooted in German.

German academics were part of Attaturk's Westernisation of the Turkish university systems. The Lacquer family were included in the 1939 Scurla Report by the Nazi academic Herbert Scurla who was sent to Turkey to report on the status of these academics, many of whom had moved there due to Nazi persecution. Her older brother Kurt Laqueur [de] followed the family to escape persecution after he was denied the right to study or follow an apprenticeship in his home country. Kurt Laqueur was later interned in the Kırşehir internment camp as Turkey became less welcoming to refugees from Germany after 1938. Whilst there he married Aenne Baade, daughter of Fritz Baade, German economist and Social Democratic Party of Germany (centre left) politician whose family were also part of the Haymatloz as Edith Baade had Jewish ancestry. Kurt Laqueur later became a German diplomat.

== Career ==
Laqueur sought work as what she called a "Sprachtippse" (language typist) in a Turkish bank, translating Turkish into English and German. During the Second World War, she worked for the Turkish section of the Jewish Agency in Ankara, among others. She remained in Turkey until 1960. She undertook worldwide assignments for various companies, including IBM and NCR over the next forty years, becoming one of the first female computer scientists. She worked in Beirut, Tel Aviv, North Africa and the USA. It was not until the 1980s that she returned to Germany.

== Political career ==
From 1993 to 1997 Laqueur was a member of the city council for the Bündnis 90/Die Grünen Green parliamentary group in the Wiesbadener Stadtparlament (the Wiesbaden city parliament). From 1994 to 1997, she served as deputy chair of the parliamentary group.

In the last decade of her life, she was a sought-after contemporary witness who was able to describe her own experience of flight from Nazi Germany and her exile in Turkey.

Marianne Laqueur died on 5 April 2006 in Wiesbaden.

== Commemoration ==
Laqueur was celebrated in an exhibition Cumhuriyet Kadınları Sahneye Çıkıyor: Cevval, Akılcı, Dirençli, Sabırlı ve İnançlı, (Republican Women Take to the Stage: Brave, Rational, Resistant, Patient and Faithful) organised at Goethe-Institut Ankara from 5 December 2023 to 4 February 2024 in honour of the 100th anniversary of the founding of the Republic of Turkey and the 90th anniversary of Turkish women gaining the right to vote. It showcased the lives and careers of six women who were educated in the young Turkish Republic and the Weimar Republic and whose careers made an impact on the world. Alongside Laqueur the exhibition featured archaeologist Halet Çambel, architect Mualla Eyüboğlu Anhegger, Semiha Berksoy, Turkey's first Muslim opera singer, paediatrician Erna Eckstein Schlossmann and architect Margarete Schütte-Lihotzky.
