= Elif Naci =

Elif Naci Kalpakçıoğlu
- Born: Elif Naci; 1898; Gelibolu, Ottoman Empire
- Died: 8 May 1987 (aged 88–89); Istanbul, Turkey
- Education: Painting
- Alma mater: Higher School of Fine Arts
- Movement: Group D
- Awards: 1. State Plaquette of Honor(1982); 2. "Lifetime Journalist" award by the Turkish Journalists' Association(1984); 3. "Gratitude for Labor" award by the Union of Turkish Journalists(1984); 4. "Certificate of Service" by the Directorate General of Press and Information(1984)

Elif Naci Kalpakçıoğlu (1898 – 8 May 1987), best known as Elif Naci, was a Turkish painter, curator, journalist and writer.

== Early life ==
Elif Naci was born in Gelibolu, Çanakkale, Ottoman Empire in 1898. He completed his primary education in Edirne, where his father Miralay Hüsnü, an Ottoman Army officer in the rank of Colonel, was stationed. Later, he studied at Ayadofya Middle School and Vefa High School, both in Istanbul. In 1913, he entered "Higher School of Fine Arts" (Ottoman Turkish: Sanayi-i Nefise Mekteb-i Âlisi), today Mimar Sinan Fine Arts University to study painting.. As the Ottoman Empire entered World War I, he was conscripted at the age of 17. During World War I, he served four years in the military. Following his discharge, he returned to his school, and attended the workshop of İbrahim Çallı (1882–1960). In 1928, he graduated from the academy. He noted that "he learned the impressionist painting because Çallı and his colleagues studied in Paris, France, and they were the first painters, who brought this art movement to Turkey".

== Career ==
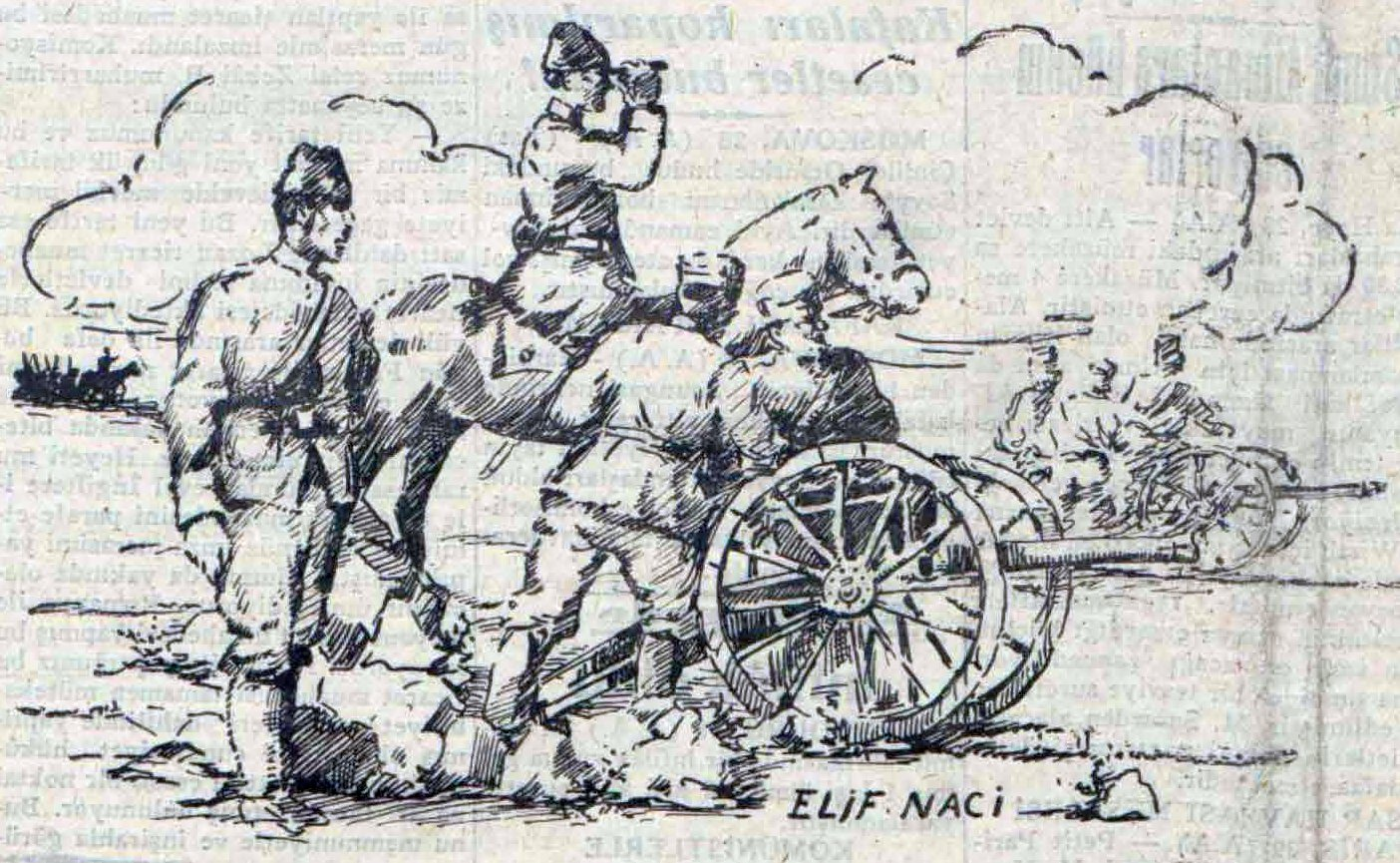
Drawing by Elif Naci in Milliyet newspaper, 30 August 1929

During his student years, he worked as an archive clerk at a newspaper to earn a living. Starting with İleri, he worked later for the dailies İkdam, İfham, Milliyet, Tan, Son Telgraf and Cumhuriyet, writing articles on arts forty years long. He is considered as a good polemicist.

After graduation from the academy, he was appointed assistant manager at the Turkish and Islamic Arts Museum. Later, he became the director of the museum. During this period, he inserted Arabic letters —his name "Elif" is the first letter of the Arabic alphabet, which was in use in the Ottoman Empire and Turkey until 1928, represents "A"— and Turkish motifs into his paintings. He countered to those, who tcritized his art with letters, with "painters like Braque, Juan Gris, Picasso, Chagall, Dufy and Klee also placed Latin letters in their works".

He painted in the art movement of Impressionism. In 1930, he held his first exhibition at the Procession Kiosk. He then took part in exhibitions at exhibitions of the "Independent Painters and Sculptors Association". In 1933, he cofounded the art movement Group D with four other artists. By October that year, the first exhibition of the Group D painters took place, and it made waves. The group held later 15 exhibitions in the premises of the Halkevi, Academy of Fine Arts and Consulate-General of France, Istanbul until the group's broke up in 1947.

In 1939, he took part in the first state exhibition with his portrait of Mustafa Kemal Atatürk (1881–1938). He served as government commissioner during the archaeological excavations at Aslantepe Tumulus in Malatya. In 1940, he went to Samsun —where Atatürk had set foot in 1919 to start the Turkish War of Independence, and participated at the second state exhibition with paintings he created there. At a time when the World War II intensified, he was conscripted for reserve service in Balıkesir. Commissioned by the Republican People's Party as a painter, he worked in Balıkesir in 1940. He wrote articles in the daily Balıkesir Postası and the magazine Kaynak of the Balıkesir Halkevi. There, he held his second personal exhibition.

His participation at mixed exhibitions abroad were in Budapest, Athens, Bucharest, Moscow, Brussels, London and Paris. Elif Naci held his personal exhibitions followed in 1944, at Eminönü Halkevi in 1947, in 1949 and in the entrance of Galatasaray High School in 1951.

He was appointed curator of Fatih Museum in 1953 —the 500th anniversary of Conquest of Istanbul by Mehmed the Conqueror ("Fatih Sultan Mehmed"). One year later, he was assigned to the [[Topkapı Palace|Topkapı Palace Museum. He held a private exhibition and gave a conference on the Turkish arts in Baghdad, Iraq, where he went as per the cultural agreement. In 1963, he ritered from his post as the assistant manager of the Topkapı Palace Museum]]. In adetailed exhibition held in 1965, he put his works covering all this periods on display. In the years following 1970, he intensified the exhibition works. After his retirement as a curator, he worked as an archive officer at the newspaper 'Cumhuriyet until his death.

Elif Naci authored the books, On Yılda Resim 1923-1933 (1933) ("Painting in Ten Years 1923-1933"), Şarkta Resim (1943) ("Painting in the Orient"), Elif’in 60 Yılı - Resimde ve Basında (1976) ("60 Years of Elif - In Painting and Press") and Anılardan Damlalar (1981) ("Drops from Memories").

== Private life ==
After the enacting of the Surname Law in Turkey in 1934, he adopted the family name "Kalpakçıoğlu".

Elif Naci was married with one child. He died in Istanbul on 8 May 1987. AcHis last will was fulfilled with a memorial ceremony held at the Turkish Journalists' Association.< He had wished that no ceremony to take place at the academy.

== Awards ==
In 1982, he was awarded with the "State Plaquette of Honor". In 1984, he was honored with the "Lifetime Journalist" ward by the Turkish Journalists' Association, the "Gratitude for Labor" award by the Union of Turkish Journalists and the "Certificate of Service" by the Directorate General of Press and Information.

== Books ==
1. Naci, Elif (1933). On Yılda Resim 1923 - 1933 (in Turkish).
2. Naci, Elif (1943). Şarkta Resim (in Turkish).
3. Naci, Elif (1976). Elif'in 60 Yılı - Resimde ve Basında (in Turkish). Istanbul: Hilal Matbaacılık.
4. Naci, Elif (1981). Anılardan Damlalar (in Turkish). Istanbul: Karacan Yayınları. p. 134.

== Bibliography ==
1. Elif Naci Kendini Anlatıyor (1979), Türkiyemiz, İstanbul, vol. 27, pp. 21–31
2. Elif Naci (1983), Türk ve Dünya Ünlüleri Ansiklopedisi, İstanbul, vol. IV, pp. 1956–1957
3. Elif Naci, ABr., vol. VIII, pp. 127–128
