= D Grubu =

Turkish art collective

The D Grubu (English: Group D) is an artist collective founded in Istanbul, Turkey in 1933 by five painters (Zeki Faik İzer, Nurullah Berk, Elif Naci, Cemal Tollu, Abidin Dino) and one sculptor (Zühtü Müridoğlu). The group is considered Turkey's first contemporary art movement.

== 1930's ==
The group is the fourth fine arts collective established in Turkey after the Ottoman Painters Society (Turkish: Osmanlı Ressamlar Cemiyeti), Fine Arts Union (Güzel Sanatlar Birliği/Sanayi Nefise Birliği), and Independent Painters and Sculptors Association (Müstakil Ressamlar ve Heykeltıraşlar Birliği). Getting the idea from this, Nurullah Berk recommended that they call themselves after the fourth letter of the alphabet, "D".

Artist Bedri Rahmi Eyüboğlu and his wife Eren Eyüboğlu participated D Grubu art exhibitions starting in 1936.

From an artistic perspective, their aims were to reject Impressionism, and inspired by Cubist and Constructivist to establish a strong basis for patterns.
