= Adalat =

Adalat or Adaalat may refer to:

- Adalah (Islam), the word for justice in Islam
- Adalat, a brand name for the heart drug Nifedipine
- Adalat (1958 film), a Bollywood drama
- Adalat (1976 film), a Bollywood action drama
- Adaalat (TV series), an Indian TV courtroom drama anthology series

== See also ==
- Adalah (disambiguation)
- Aap Ki Adalat, an Indian TV show
- Adalat Party, name for multiple parties
- Janta Ki Adalat, a 1994 Indian Hindi-language film
- Lok Adalat, a system of alternative dispute resolution in India
- Meri Adalat, a 1984 Indian Hindi-language film
