= Cemal Tollu =

Turkish painter (1899–1968)

Cemal Tollu (19 April 1899 – 26 July 1968) was a Turkish painter. He served in the Turkish War of Independence as a cavalry lieutenant. and witnessed the Fire of Manisa. In 1933 he founded the "D Group" with several other painters who were devoted to Cubism and Constructivism. In his later life he was to teach at the Fine Arts Academy of Istanbul until 1965.

== Paintings ==
- The Burning of Manisa during the War for Liberation (1968)
- Mother Earth (1956)
- The Ballerina (1935)
- Woman with Black Dress (1930)
