= Anatolian hieroglyph inscriptions =

Corpus of inscriptions in the Anatolian hieroglyphic script

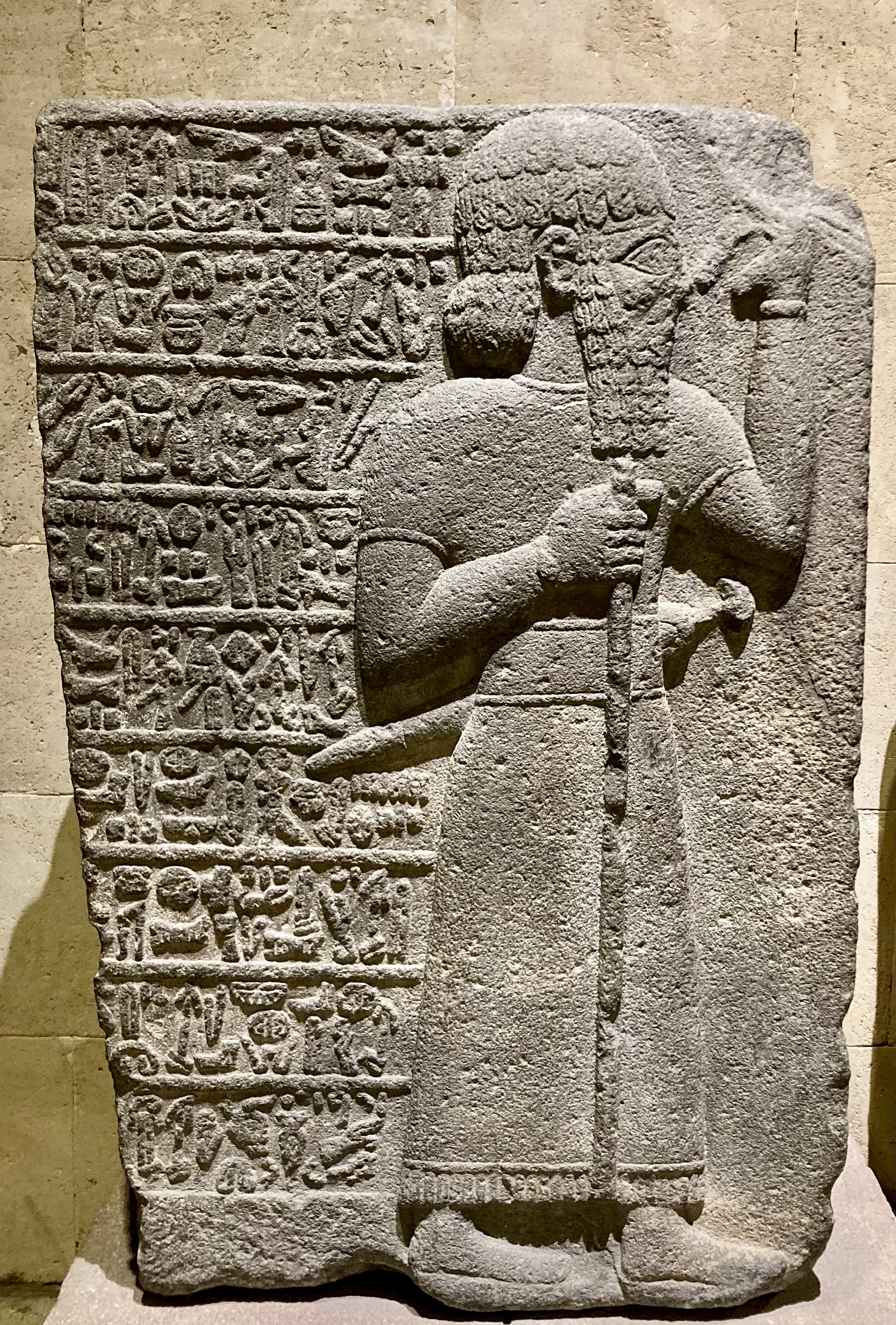
Inscription "Carchemish A13d", from the Museum of Anatolian Civilizations.

A corpus of hundreds of inscriptions written in Anatolian hieroglyphs have been discovered primarily in Anatolia and northern Syria. The texts belong mainly to the periods of the Hittite Empire and the Syro-Hittite states of the Iron Age, with a number of transitional inscriptions dating from the intervening period. The inscriptions are written only in the Luwian language, apart from foreign personal names. Many of the shorter texts consist solely of names and titles.

The inscriptions include historical texts, building inscriptions, religious dedications, funerary monuments and short epigraphs accompanying sculpture, as well as inscriptions on seals and seal impressions. The Empire-period inscriptions are generally fewer, shorter and less well preserved than those of the Iron Age, which form a more extensive and linguistically informative corpus. The principal Iron Age centres include Carchemish, Tell Ahmar, Marash, Malatya, Commagene, the Amuq Valley and Aleppo.

== Discovery, publication and decipherment ==
The earliest recorded discoveries include the four inscribed stones from Hama, observed by Johann Ludwig Burckhardt in 1812, reported in 1822 and first published in 1872 by Richard Francis Burton and Charles F. Tyrwhitt-Drake. Other inscriptions became known during the 19th century at Yazılıkaya, Nişantaş, Karabel and İvriz. In 1876, Archibald Sayce applied the term "Hittite" to the inscriptions, identifying them with the country known from Egyptian and Assyrian records.

The corpus expanded through archaeological excavations and the journeys of travelling scholars. British Museum excavations at Carchemish in 1878–1881 recovered an early collection of sculpture and inscriptions, while excavations directed by David George Hogarth, Reginald Campbell Thompson and Leonard Woolley in 1911–1914 uncovered further inscribed monuments. Carchemish became the most prolific source of hieroglyphic inscriptions, preserving a continuous epigraphic tradition from the Empire period into the Iron Age.

The first substantial progress in deciphering the script was made during the 1930s by Piero Meriggi, Helmuth Theodor Bossert, Ignace Gelb, Emil Forrer and Bedřich Hrozný. Their work established many logographic and syllabic readings and the outline of the language's grammar, although a number of proposed sign values and translations remained incorrect. Seals combining hieroglyphic and cuneiform writing provided correspondences which helped establish the readings of personal names and individual signs.

The discovery of the Karatepe bilingual by Bossert and Halet Çambel in 1946 provided a parallel Phoenician text for the longest hieroglyphic inscription then known. The bilingual confirmed much of the earlier decipherment and supplied new vocabulary. Further revisions followed the publication of inscribed storage jars from Altıntepe in 1969, whose measures provided correspondences between hieroglyphic and Urartian cuneiform writings. The resulting reassessment of several sign values, developed by John David Hawkins, Anna Morpurgo Davies and Günter Neumann in 1973–1974, established the basis for subsequent interpretation of the texts.

In 1990-1991 approximately 3,000 clay bullae in hieroglyphic Luwian were found at Hattusa.

== Corpora ==
The first corpus of Anatolian hieroglyph inscriptions was published in 1900 by Leopold Messerschmidt. Messerschmidt's Corpus Inscriptionum Hettiticarum (CIH) comprised twenty-six substantial inscriptions and twenty-eight fragments, together with shorter epigraphs and seals. The 1906 supplement increased the number of substantial inscriptions to thirty-two:

- Messerschmidt, Leopold (1902). "Corpus inscriptionum Hettiticarum (incl. supplement)". Mitteilungen der Vorderasiatischen Gesellschaft (v.5 i.4; v.5 i.5; v.7 i.3). Berlin: Wolf Peiser Verlag.

In 1911, Benson Brush Charles published the 27 inscriptions found during the 1907-08 Cornell Expedition to Asia Minor and the Assyro-Babylonian Orient (CE):

- Charles, Benson Brush (1911). Hittite Inscriptions: Certain Newly Discovered Inscriptions, Together with Revised Copies of a Number Hitherto Known and Still in Situ, Representing a Portion of the Results of the Cornell Expedition to Asia Minor and the Assyro-Babylonian Orient. University of Pennsylvania.

Further collections were published by Hrozný during the 1930s and by Ignace Gelb in his Hittite Hieroglyphic Monuments (HHM) in 1939. Emmanuel Laroche published Les Hiéroglyphes Hittites (LHH) in 1960, providing a detailed sign list and a revised system of transliteration.

Meriggi's Hieroglyphisch-hethitisches Glossar appeared in 1962, followed by his Manuale di Eteo Geroglifico (MEG, in English "Manual of Hittite Hieroglyphics") in 1966–1975, which presented inscriptions with copies, transliterations, translations and commentary:

- Parte I: Grammatica (Grammar 1966)
- Parte II: Testi (Texts, 1st Series / 2nd Series and 3rd Series, 1967–1975)

Hawkins's Corpus of Hieroglyphic Luwian Inscriptions (CHLI), published between 2000 and 2024 in three volumes, is the modern standard. CHLI has been described as providing "a meticulous record of almost all known Luwian inscriptions":

- Hawkins, John David [in German] (2000). Corpus of Hieroglyphic Luwian Inscriptions, Volume 1, Inscriptions of the Iron Age: Part 1: Text, Introduction, Karatepe, Karkamis, Tell Ahmar, Maras, Malatya, Commagene. Part 2: Text, Amuq, Aleppo, Hama, Tabal, Assur Letters, Miscellaneous, Seals, Indices. Part 3: Plates. Berlin and New York: Walter de Gruyter. doi:10.1515/9783110804201. ISBN 978-3-11-010864-4.
- Cambel, Halet (1999-12-31). Corpus of hieroglyphic Luwian inscriptions, Volume 2, Karatepe-Aslantas: The Inscriptions: Facsimile Edition. DE GRUYTER. doi:10.1515/9783110879759. ISBN 978-3-11-014870-1.
- Hawkins, John David (2024-02-19). Corpus of Hieroglyphic Luwian Inscriptions: Volume III: Inscriptions of the Hittite Empire and New Inscriptions of the Iron Age. De Gruyter. doi:10.1515/9783110778854. ISBN 978-3-11-077885-4.

Hawkins noted the number of inscriptions at each point in time:

	Additions in each corpus									Total
Corpus:	CIH		Carchemish		HHM	LHH		CHLI		Total
Corpus:	1900	1906	1914	1921	1939	1960	1969	1991	2024	2024
Major inscriptions	26	6	21		15	9	4	14	25	120
Minor inscriptions	28	1	(many)		25	(many)	(some)	30	26	110+

== List ==
A table of the most notable inscriptions, from John David Hawkins' Corpus of Hieroglyphic Luwian Inscriptions (CHLI) is shown below:

Name	Image	Region	CHLI	Museum	Museum Inv no	CIH	CE	HHM	MEG
Karatepe bilingual (Karatepe 1)		Cilica	I.1.	Karatepe-Aslantaş Open-Air Museum					I 24
Karatepe 2		Cilica	I.2.	Karatepe-Aslantaş Open-Air Museum					
Karatepe 3		Cilica	I.3.	Karatepe-Aslantaş Open-Air Museum					
Karatepe 4		Cilica	I.4.	Karatepe-Aslantaş Open-Air Museum					
Karatepe fragments		Cilica	I.5.	Karatepe-Aslantaş Open-Air Museum					
Domuztepe 1		Cilica	I.6.	Karatepe-Aslantaş Open-Air Museum					
Domuztepe 2		Cilica	I.7.	Karatepe-Aslantaş Open-Air Museum					
Adana, unpublished		Cilica	I.8.	Adana Archaeology Museum					
Çineköy inscription		Cilica	I.	Adana Archaeology Museum					
Carchemish A4b		Carchemish	II.1.	Museum of Anatolian Civilizations	34				III 163
Carchemish A16c		Carchemish	II.2.	Museum of Anatolian Civilizations	10910 (lost?); 2				III 185
Carchemish A18d 1		Carchemish	II.3.						III 196
Carchemish A14b		Carchemish	II.4.	Museum of Anatolian Civilizations	69				II 177
Carchemish A14a		Carchemish	II.5.	Museum of Anatolian Civilizations	60			13	II 176
Carchemish A1a		Carchemish	II.6.	Museum of Anatolian Civilizations	10067				I 29
Carchemish A1b		Carchemish	II.7.	Museum of Anatolian Civilizations	10075	XVB			I 16
Kelekli		Carchemish	II.8.	Vorderasiatisches Museum	VA 8477		XXV		II 157
Carchemish (A8 =) A11a		Carchemish	II.9.	Museum of Anatolian Civilizations; British Museum	10900a–b; 117916				I 21
Carchemish A4d		Carchemish	II.10.	Museum of Anatolian Civilizations	160d				II 165
Carchemish (A9 =) A11b		Carchemish	II.11.	Museum of Anatolian Civilizations	113				I 22
Carchemish (A10 =) A11c		Carchemish	II.12.	Museum of Anatolian Civilizations	99				I 23
Carchemish A2		Carchemish	II.13.	Museum of Anatolian Civilizations	82				I 19
Carchemish A3		Carchemish	II.14.	Museum of Anatolian Civilizations	81				I 20
Carchemish A12		Carchemish	II.15.	Museum of Anatolian Civilizations	106 A (B, C, D)				II 173
Carchemish A13d		Carchemish	II.16.	Museum of Anatolian Civilizations	89				II 175
Carchemish A23		Carchemish	II.17.	British Museum	125002	IX			II 215
Carchemish A26a 1–2		Carchemish	II.18.	British Museum; Sadberk Hanım Museum	125000d; 6869	XII,3–4			II 223
Carchemish A20a 1–2		Carchemish	II.19.	Museum of Anatolian Civilizations	10909; 130			11	II 216
Carchemish A25a 1–4		Carchemish	II.20.	Museum of Anatolian Civilizations; Museo Missionario, Collezione Gauttieri	137; 164			12	II 221
Carchemish A16b		Carchemish	II.21.						II 184
Carchemish A6		Carchemish	II.22.	Museum of Anatolian Civilizations	90				I 10
Carchemish A7a–j		Carchemish	II.23.	Museum of Anatolian Civilizations	91; 92; 93				I 9
Carchemish A15b		Carchemish	II.24.	Museum of Anatolian Civilizations	100				I 11
Carchemish A24a 1–22		Carchemish	II.25.	Museum of Anatolian Civilizations	10886; 10891; 10892; 10893; 10895; 11 (lost?); 11146; 11166; 11172; 20 (lost?); nos. 131+140			10	II 220
Carchemish stone bowl		Carchemish	II.25a.	Bible Lands Museum Jerusalem	?				
Carchemish A31 (= A32)		Carchemish	II.26.	British Museum; Museo Missionario, Collezione Gauttieri	125007; 159	XI			II 257
Cekke		Carchemish	II.27.	National Museum of Damascus	2459				I 28
Carchemish A4a		Carchemish	II.28.	Museum of Anatolian Civilizations; Bodmer Library	?; nos. 144, 10912, 2026				II 162
Carchemish (A18g =) A4a		Carchemish	II.28.	Museum of Anatolian Civilizations; Bodmer Library	?; nos. 144, 10912, 2026				II 162
Tünp Stele (Tünp 1)		Carchemish	II.29.	Gaziantep Museum of Archaeology	1987				II 153
Carchemish A25b		Carchemish	II.30.	Ashmolean Museum	1913.914				II 222
Carchemish A21b+d (= A22b+d)		Carchemish	II.31.	British Museum	125003 (1879-8-19); 125009 (1881-10-9)	X; XII,1			
Carchemish A20b 1–13		Carchemish	II.32.	Museum of Anatolian Civilizations; British Museum; Gaziantep Museum of Archaeology	10875; 10876; 10883; 10932; 11144; 125000g; 125001c; 131688; 290	XII,2; XIII,1; XIII,8			II 219; II 263; II 268aa
Carchemish A22c		Carchemish	II.33.			XIV,7			II 218
Carchemish A27u		Carchemish	II.34.	Museum of Anatolian Civilizations	10899				II 231
Carchemish A27e frags. 1, 2		Carchemish	II.35.	Museum of Anatolian Civilizations	10878; 10938				
Carchemish A13a–c		Carchemish	II.36.	Museum of Anatolian Civilizations	10960				II 174
Carchemish A26f		Carchemish	II.37.	British Museum	125005 (1882-10-15)	XVA			II 225
Carchemish A15e		Carchemish	II.38.	British Museum					II 182
Carchemish A27c		Carchemish	II.39.	British Museum					
Körkün		Carchemish	II.40.	Gaziantep Museum of Archaeology	4136				II 152
Carchemish A17b		Carchemish	II.41.	Museum of Anatolian Civilizations	134				II 190
Carchemish A30h		Carchemish	II.42.	British Museum	125008				III 256
Tilsevet (alias Ekinveren)		Carchemish	II.43.	Gaziantep Museum of Archaeology	1719				II 155
Carchemish A18h		Carchemish	II.44.	Museum of Anatolian Civilizations	10092				I 15
Carchemish A5a		Carchemish	II.45.	Museum of Anatolian Civilizations	10102				II 166
Carchemish A5b		Carchemish	II.46.	Museum of Anatolian Civilizations	10961				I 14
Carchemish A18f		Carchemish	II.47.	British Museum					I 15a
Carchemish A4c		Carchemish	II.48.	British Museum					II 164
Carchemish A16f		Carchemish	II.49.	British Museum					II 188
Carchemish A15a		Carchemish	II.50.	Museum of Anatolian Civilizations	39.				II 178
Carchemish A15c		Carchemish	II.51.	Museum of Anatolian Civilizations	88				II 180
Carchemish A16a		Carchemish	II.52.	Museum of Anatolian Civilizations	10898a–d				II 183
Carchemish A17a		Carchemish	II.53.	Museum of Anatolian Civilizations	146				II 189
Carchemish A17c		Carchemish	II.54.	Museum of Anatolian Civilizations	10962				II 191
Carchemish A17d		Carchemish	II.55.	Museum of Anatolian Civilizations	10947				II 192
Carchemish A18a		Carchemish	II.56.	British Museum					II 193
Carchemish A18e		Carchemish	II.57.	Museum of Anatolian Civilizations	10963				II 197
Carchemish A18j		Carchemish	II.58.	Museum of Anatolian Civilizations	10911				II 201
Carchemish B33		Carchemish	II.59.	Museum of Anatolian Civilizations	10079				II 258
Carchemish A15d		Carchemish	II.60.	British Museum					II 181
Carchemish A16d		Carchemish	II.61.	Museum of Anatolian Civilizations	10897				II 186
Carchemish A16e		Carchemish	II.62.	Museum of Anatolian Civilizations	10896				II 187
Carchemish A18b		Carchemish	II.63.						II 194
Carchemish A18c		Carchemish	II.64.						II 195
Carchemish A18i		Carchemish	II.65.	British Museum					II 200
Carchemish B39a		Carchemish	II.66.	Museum of Anatolian Civilizations	103			14	II 258
Carchemish A19		Carchemish	II.67.	Museum of Anatolian Civilizations; Ashmolean Museum; British Museum	10901; 10903; 10905; 10907; 10914; 10928; 10933; 1913.913; nos. 10920, 10902; nos. 10927, 10904, 10898, 10929, 10930				II 202; II 203; II 204; II 205; II 206; II 207; II 208; II 209; II 210; II 211; II 212; II 213; II 214
Carchemish A26b–e		Carchemish	II.68.	British Museum					II 224
Carchemish A27		Carchemish	II.69.	Museum of Anatolian Civilizations; British Museum	10846; 10877; 10879; 10885; 10887; 10888; 10889; 10890; 10894; 10908; 10952; 10956; 10958; nos. 10882, 10881				II 226; II 227; II 228; II 229; II 230; II 231; II 232; II 233; II 234; II 235; II 236; II 237; II 238
Carchemish A28		Carchemish	II.70.	British Museum	125000a; 125000b; 125000e; 125000h; 125001a; 125001b; 125001d; 125001e; 125001f; 125001g; 125001h; 125001i; 125001j; 125001k	XII,5; XII,6; XIII,2; XIII,3; XIII,4; XIII,5; XIII,6; XIII,7; XIII,9; XIV,2; XIV,3; XIV,4; XIV,5; XIV,6			II 239; II 240
Carchemish A29		Carchemish	II.71.	Museum of Anatolian Civilizations; British Museum	10874; 10884; 10937; 10945; 11163; 11164; 11175; 11176; 11181; nos. 11149, 11168				II 241; II 242; II 243; II 244; II 245; II 246; II 247; II 248; II 249; II 250; II 251
Carchemish A30		Carchemish	II.72.	Museum of Anatolian Civilizations; British Museum	10880; 11197; 125013; 6941	XIV,1			II 252; II 253; II 254; II 255
Carchemish sherd		Carchemish	II.73.	Museum of the Ancient Orient	6975				II 275
Carchemish frags. a/b		Carchemish	II.74.						III 266
Afşin+		Carchemish	II.						
Karkamış N1		Carchemish	II.						
Yunus 1		Carchemish	II.						
Silsile		Carchemish	II.						
Şaraga		Carchemish	II.						
Adana 1		Carchemish	II.						
Dülük		Carchemish	II.						
Karkamış (II.77, unpublished)		Carchemish	II.77.						
Gürçay		Carchemish	II.						
Karkamış new fragments		II.							
Tell Ahmar 2		Tel Ahmar, Syria	III.1.	Louvre	AO 11505				II 281
Borowski 3		Tel Ahmar, Syria	III.2.	Bible Lands Museum Jerusalem	?				
Tell Ahmar 5		Tel Ahmar, Syria	III.3.	National Museum of Damascus	nos. ?				
Tell Ahmar 4		Tel Ahmar, Syria	III.4.	Private collections					
Aleppo 2		Tel Ahmar, Syria	III.5.	National Museum of Damascus	2460				II 307
Tell Ahmar 1		Tel Ahmar, Syria	III.6.	National Museum of Damascus	2				II 280
Tell Ahmar 3 (Louvre)		Tel Ahmar, Syria	III.7.	Louvre	AO 26.533.				
Tell Ahmar frags. 1–9		Tel Ahmar, Syria	III.8.	Louvre; National Museum of Damascus	?; nos. ?				II 282; II 283; II 284
Tell Ahmar frag. 10		Tel Ahmar, Syria	III.9.	National Museum of Damascus	?				
Arslan Tash		Tel Ahmar, Syria	III.10.						
Tell Ahmar 6		Tel Ahmar, Syria	III.						
Kahramanmaraş 8		Marash	IV.1.	Metropolitan Museum of Art	90.21 (formerly 1904)	XXV	XXVII		II 139
Kahramanmaraş 4		Marash	IV.2.	Museum of the Ancient Orient	7772 (formerly 1625)	LII			I 32
İskenderun		Marash	IV.3.	Museum of the Ancient Orient	7691	VIII			II 288
Maraş lion (Kahramanmaraş 1)		Marash	IV.4.	Museum of the Ancient Orient	7698 (formerly 840?)	XXI			I 33
Kahramanmaraş 14		Marash	IV.5.	Kahramanmaraş Archaeology Museum	1/1/85				
Kahramanmaraş 3		Marash	IV.6.	Vorderasiatisches Museum	VA 973	XXIIIA–B			II 134
Kahramanmaraş 5		Marash	IV.7.	Vorderasiatisches Museum	7781				II 136
Kahramanmaraş 11		Marash	IV.8.	Adana Archaeology Museum	1721				II 142
Kürtül		Marash	IV.9.	Kahramanmaraş Archaeology Museum	228 (or 197)				II 145
Kahramanmaraş 2		Marash	IV.10.	Museum of the Ancient Orient	7694 (formerly 836)	XXII			II 133
Kahramanmaraş 9		Marash	IV.11.	Louvre	AO 19222				II 140
Kahramanmaraş 12		Marash	IV.12.	Kahramanmaraş Archaeology Museum	229				II 143
Karaburçlu		Marash	IV.13.	Museum of the Ancient Orient	7729 (formerly 872)	XXVI			II 146
Kahramanmaraş 13		Marash	IV.14.	Kahramanmaraş Archaeology Museum	2215				
Hacıbekli		Marash	IV.15.	Adana Archaeology Museum	1297				II 144
Kahramanmaraş 6 (Leningrad)		Marash	IV.16.	Hermitage Museum	18589	XXIIIC			II 137
Kahramanmaraş 7		Marash	IV.17.	Metropolitan Museum of Art	X.196 (formerly 1906?)	XXIV			II 138
Kahramanmaraş 10		Marash	IV.18.	Adana Archaeology Museum	1724				II 141
Kahramanmaraş 15		Marash	IV.19.	Kahramanmaraş Archaeology Museum	11.2.89				
Kahramanmaraş 16		Marash	IV.20.	Kahramanmaraş Archaeology Museum	?				
Maraş 17		Marash	IV.						
Karahüyük (Elbistan)		Malatya	V.1.	Museum of Anatolian Civilizations	10754				III 101
Gürün		Malatya	V.2.	Rock reliefs etc. in situ		XVIII	XVI, 30–31	23–24	II 97
Kötükale		Malatya	V.3.	Rock reliefs etc. in situ			XX	40	II 104
İspekçür		Malatya	V.4.	Sivas Congress and Ethnography Museum	342		XVIII–XIX, 33–39	28	II 103
Darende stele		Malatya	V.5.	Museum of Anatolian Civilizations	?			18	II 98
Malatya 5		Malatya	V.6.	Museum of Anatolian Civilizations	12249 (formerly Istanbul, 7789)				II 109
Malatya 6		Malatya	V.7.	Museum of Anatolian Civilizations	12248 (formerly Istanbul, 7788)				II 110
Malatya 7		Malatya	V.8.	Museum of Anatolian Civilizations	12247 (formerly Istanbul, 7790)				II 111
Malatya 8		Malatya	V.9.	Museum of Anatolian Civilizations	55			45	II 112
Malatya 9		Malatya	V.10.	Museum of Anatolian Civilizations	12252				II 113
Malatya 10		Malatya	V.11.	Museum of Anatolian Civilizations	12251				II 114
Malatya 11		Malatya	V.12.	Museum of Anatolian Civilizations	12253				II 115
Malatya 12		Malatya	V.13.	Museum of Anatolian Civilizations	12254				II 116
Malatya 14		Malatya	V.14.	Malatya Museum	625				II 118
İzgin 1 and 2		Malatya	V.15.	Museum of the Ancient Orient	7693	XIX			II 102
Malatya 1		Malatya	V.16.	Museum of Anatolian Civilizations	12245 (formerly Istanbul, 7704)	XVIA			II 105
Malatya 4		Malatya	V.17.	Museum of Anatolian Civilizations	1802		XXI, 40	46	II 108
Malatya 3		Malatya	V.18.	Louvre	AM 255	XLVII			II 107
Şirzi		Malatya	V.19.	Rock reliefs etc. in situ					II 119
Palanga		Malatya	V.20.	Museum of the Ancient Orient	7764 (formerly 1215)	XX			II 99
Malatya 2		Malatya	V.21.	Museum of Anatolian Civilizations	12246 (formerly Istanbul, 7705)	XVIB			II 106
Malatya 13		Malatya	V.22.	Museum of Anatolian Civilizations	10304				II 117
Arslantaş (Elbistan)		Malatya	V.23.				XVII, 32		III 100
Boybeypınarı 1		Commagene	VI.1.	Museum of Anatolian Civilizations	21+22			4–5	II 128–129
Boybeypınarı 2		Commagene	VI.2.	Museum of Anatolian Civilizations	24+23			6–7	II 130–131
Malpınar		Commagene	VI.3.	Rock reliefs etc. in situ					
Adıyaman 1		Commagene	VI.4.	Adıyaman Museum	493				II 122
Ancoz 1		Commagene	VI.5.	Adana Archaeology Museum	1336				II 124
Ancoz 2		Commagene	VI.6.						II 125
Ancoz 3		Commagene	VI.7.						
Ancoz 4		Commagene	VI.8.						
Ancoz 5		Commagene	VI.9.	Adıyaman Archaeological Museum	364				
Ancoz 6		Commagene	VI.10.						
Adıyaman 2		Commagene	VI.11.	Adıyaman Archaeological Museum	492				II 123
Samsat 1		Commagene	VI.12.	Adıyaman Archaeological Museum	?	XVII	XXVI		II 126
Samsat 2		Commagene	VI.13.	Lost/unknown location					II 127
Samsat 3		Commagene	VI.14.	Lost/unknown location					
Samsat frags. 1–10		Commagene	VI.15.	Adıyaman Archaeological Museum	1685; 1860; 2147; 2274; 3452; 3813; 4733; 4735; 4771; 4772				
Ancoz 7		Commagene	VI.16.	Adıyaman Archaeological Museum	686				
Ancoz 8		Commagene	VI.17.	Adıyaman Archaeological Museum	682				
Ancoz 9		Commagene	VI.18.	Adıyaman Archaeological Museum	683				
Ancoz 10		Commagene	VI.19.	Adıyaman Archaeological Museum	485				
Ancoz 8+5		Commagene	VI.						
Ancoz 10+11		Commagene	VI.						
Tell Tayinat 1		Amik Valley	VII.1.	Institute for the Study of Ancient Cultures	(excav.) T 1260			52	II 293
Tell Tayinat 2		Amik Valley	VII.2.	Institute for the Study of Ancient Cultures	(excav.) nos. T 3277u + T 199 + T 598 + T 3277e + T 3277t; T 125; T 300; T 3277c; T 3277d; T 3277f; T 3277k; nos. T 2584 + T 623; nos. T 3277a + T 201; nos. T 3277b + T 398 + T 3277n; nos. T 3277g + T 3277j; nos. T 3277h + T 3277i			54; 55; 56; 57; 58	II 295; II 296; II 298; II 299
Tell Tayinat 3		Amik Valley	VII.3.	Lost/unknown location				53	III 294
Tell Tayinat fragments		Amik Valley	VII.4.	Institute for the Study of Ancient Cultures	(excav.) T 200; (excav.) T 203, T 206; (excav.) T 2610; (excav.) T 550; (excav.) T 551; (excav.) T 690; (excav.) nos. T 202, T 834; (excav.) nos. T 2164, T 2595, T 2611, T 2618, T 2623–26, T 2640–42, T 2957; (excav.) nos. T 2347, T 2656:1–13; (excav.) nos. T 2898, T 2899; (excav.) nos. T 327 l, m, o–s; (excav.) nos. T 553–556, 559, 577–579, 671:1–2; (excav.) nos. T 624, T 693; (excav.) nos. T 846, T 1040			59	II 300; II 301; II 302
Jisr el Hadid frags. 1–3		Amik Valley	VII.5.	Institute for the Study of Ancient Cultures	A23427-9			30–32	II 290–292
Tuleil 1		Amik Valley	VII.6.	Institute for the Study of Ancient Cultures	A 23430			60	II 303
Tuleil 2		Amik Valley	VII.7.	Institute for the Study of Ancient Cultures	A 23431			61	II 304
Kirçoğlu		Amik Valley	VII.8.	Vorderasiatisches Museum	VA 3009	VII			II 289
Azaz		Amik Valley	VII.9.	National Museum of Damascus	?				II 286
Ain Dara		Amik Valley	VII.10.						
Afrin		Amik Valley	VII.11.						
Antakya, unpublished		Amik Valley	VII.12.						
Arsuz 1+2		Amik Valley	VII.	Hatay Archaeology Museum					
Jisr el Hadid 4		Amik Valley	VII.						
Tell Tayinat 4		Amik Valley	VII.						
Tell Tayinat 5		Amik Valley	VII.						
Babylon 1		Aleppo	VIII.1.	Museum of the Ancient Orient	7816	II			I 13
Babylon 2		Aleppo	VIII.2.	British Museum	125004	I,3–4			I 1a; I 12
Babylon 3		Aleppo	VIII.3.	Vorderasiatisches Museum	VA Bab. 1507				I 2
Aleppo 4		Aleppo	VIII.						
Aleppo 5		Aleppo	VIII.						
Aleppo 6		Aleppo	VIII.						
Aleppo 7		Aleppo	VIII.						
Hama 4		Hama	IX.1.	Museum of the Ancient Orient	7692	V–VI			II 312
Hama 5		Hama	IX.2.	Hama Museum	?				II 313
Restan		Hama	IX.3.	Louvre	AO 4539A			47	I 5
Qalaat al-Madiq		Hama	IX.4.	National Museum of Damascus	M 6525				I 6
Hines		Hama	IX.5.					25	II 320
Hama 8		Hama	IX.6.	Lost/unknown location					
Hama 9		Hama	IX.7.	British Museum	133011; 133014; 133015; 133016; 133018; 133021; 133023; 134325 (1963-12-14,11)				II 314
Hama 1		Hama	IX.8.	Museum of the Ancient Orient	7688	IIIB			
Hama 2		Hama	IX.9.	Museum of the Ancient Orient	7690	IVA			
Hama 3		Hama	IX.10.	Museum of the Ancient Orient	7689	IVB			
Hama 6		Hama	IX.11.	Hama Museum	?				
Hama 7		Hama	IX.12.	Hama Museum	?				
Meharde		Hama	IX.13.	Lost/unknown location; National Museum of Damascus	5051				II 316
Sheizar		Hama	IX.14.	Beirut Museum; Hama Museum	?				
Hama frag. 1		Hama	IX.15.						
Hama frag. 2		Hama	IX.16.	National Museum	(excav.) 7A 526				
Hama frag. 3		Hama	IX.17.						II 315
Hama frag. 4		Hama	IX.18.	National Museum	(excav.) 5A 496				
Hama frag. 5		Hama	IX.19.						
Hama frag. 6		Hama	IX.20.						
Hama frags. 7–10		Hama	IX.21a–d.	National Museum	(excav.) nos. 8A 198, 8A 436, 6A 383, 8A 4a–c				
Tell Šṭīb		Hama	IX.						
Kızıldağ 1		Tabal (region)	X.1.	Rock reliefs etc. in situ					III 14
Kızıldağ 2		Tabal (region)	X.2.						III 15
Kızıldağ 3		Tabal (region)	X.3.						III 16
Kızıldağ 5		Tabal (region)	X.4.						III 18
Kızıldağ 4		Tabal (region)	X.5.	Rock reliefs etc. in situ					III 17
Karadağ 1		Tabal (region)	X.6.	Rock reliefs etc. in situ			I, 1–3		III 12
Karadağ 2		Tabal (region)	X.7.	Rock reliefs etc. in situ					III 13
Burunkaya		Tabal (region)	X.8.	Rock reliefs etc. in situ					
Kululu 1		Tabal (region)	X.9.	Kayseri Museum	2241				I 18
Kululu 4		Tabal (region)	X.10.	Kayseri Museum	76/248				
Çiftlik		Tabal (region)	X.11.	Kayseri Museum	11			17	II 34
Topada		Tabal (region)	X.12.	Rock reliefs etc. in situ				36	I 31
Suvasa		Tabal (region)	X.13.	Rock reliefs etc. in situ				50	III 36
Sultanhan		Tabal (region)	X.14.	Museum of Anatolian Civilizations	12132 (stele); 37 (base)			49	I 30
Kayseri		Tabal (region)	X.15.	Museum of Anatolian Civilizations	38			38	II 67
Aksaray Stele		Tabal (region)	X.16.	Aksaray Museum	1-1-77				
Bohça		Tabal (region)	X.17.	Kayseri Museum	6	LI	IX–X, 15–19		I 27
Karaburun		Tabal (region)	X.18.	Rock reliefs etc. in situ		XLVI	V, 11	33	I 26
Hisarcık 1		Tabal (region)	X.19.	Museum of the Ancient Orient	7762 (formerly 1193)	XLVIII			II 69
Kululu 5		Tabal (region)	X.20.	Kayseri Museum	77/537				
Kululu 2		Tabal (region)	X.21.	Kayseri Museum	2340				I 17
Kululu 3		Tabal (region)	X.22.	Kayseri Museum	5515				II 94a; III – Add. 94a
Eğrek		Tabal (region)	X.23.	Museum of the Ancient Orient	7766 (formerly 1217)	XXXIA–B			II 78
Erkilet 1		Tabal (region)	X.24.	Kayseri Museum	4			20	I 4
Erkilet 2		Tabal (region)	X.25.	Kayseri Museum	5			21	I 3
Eğriköy		Tabal (region)	X.26.	Kayseri Museum	9		XIII, 24	19	II 72
Hisarcık 2		Tabal (region)	X.27.	Rock reliefs etc. in situ			VI, 13	26	II 68
Çalapverdi 1		Tabal (region)	X.28.	Museum of Anatolian Civilizations	18			15	II 63
Çalapverdi 2		Tabal (region)	X.29.	Museum of Anatolian Civilizations	42			16	II 64
Tekirderbent 1		Tabal (region)	X.30.	Kayseri Museum	7		VII, 14		II 70
Tekirderbent 2		Tabal (region)	X.31.	Kayseri Museum	8		VIII		II 71
Kurubel		Tabal (region)	X.32.	Kayseri Museum	25		XV, 27–29	44	II 76
Kululu 6		Tabal (region)	X.33.	Kayseri Museum	nos. 4845 and ?				III – Add. 93
Kululu 8		Tabal (region)	X.34.	Kayseri Museum	5723				
Kululu 7		Tabal (region)	X.35.	Kayseri Museum	?				III – Add. 94
Kululu lead strip 1		Tabal (region)	X.36.	Museum of Anatolian Civilizations	115-1-81				
Kululu lead strip 2		Tabal (region)	X.37.	Museum of Anatolian Civilizations	115-2-81				
Kululu lead frag. 1		Tabal (region)	X.38.	Museum of Anatolian Civilizations	115-3-81				
Kululu lead frag. 3		Tabal (region)	X.39.	Museum of Anatolian Civilizations	115-4-81				
Kululu lead frag. 2 (joined to lead strip 3)		Tabal (region)	X.40.	Museum of Anatolian Civilizations	155-5-81				
Kululu lead strip 3 + frag. 2		Tabal (region)	X.40.	Museum of Anatolian Civilizations	155-5-81				
Niğde 1		Tabal (region)	X.41.	Museum of the Ancient Orient	7774	LIII			I 1
Andaval		Tabal (region)	X.42.	Museum of Anatolian Civilizations	?	XXXIC		3	II 32
İvriz monuments (İvriz 1)		Tabal (region)	X.43.	Rock reliefs etc. in situ		XXXIV	XI, 21	29	I 7; II 25
Bor		Tabal (region)	X.44.	Museum of the Ancient Orient	7695 (formerly 837)	XXXIIIA,C			II 30
Bulgarmaden		Tabal (region)	X.45.	Rock reliefs etc. in situ		XXXII	XII	8	I 25
İvriz 2		Tabal (region)	X.46.	Ereğli Museum	A.1991				
Niğde Stele (Niğde 2)		Tabal (region)	X.47.	Niğde Archaeological Museum	22.1.75				
Porsuk Inscription		Tabal (region)	X.48.	Niğde Archaeological Museum	52.				II 29
Veliisa Stele		Tabal (region)	X.49.	Niğde Archaeological Museum	53.			62	II 33
İvriz frags. 1–3		Tabal (region)	X.50.	Museum of Anatolian Civilizations; Ereğli Museum	1420, ?; 7454				II 26
Keşlik Stele		Tabal (region)	X.51.	Niğde Archaeological Museum	51				
Ereğli, unpublished		Tabal (region)	X.52.	Ereğli Museum	?				
Yassıhöyük a		Tabal (region)	X.						
Yassıhöyük b		Tabal (region)	X.						
Türkmen Karahöyük		Tabal (region)	X.						
Gemerek		Tabal (region)	X.						
İstanbul 2		Tabal (region)	X.						
Assur letters a–f+g		Assur	XI.1–6.						
Borowski 1			XII.1.	Bible Lands Museum Jerusalem	?				
Borowski 2			XII.2.	Bible Lands Museum Jerusalem	?				
Beirut stone bowl			XII.3.	Lost/unknown location					
Ankara			XII.4.	Museum of Anatolian Civilizations	150			9	II 276
Istanbul			XII.5.	Museum of the Ancient Orient	12469				II 328
Aleppo 3			XII.6.	National Museum of Damascus	6422				
Gaziantep			XII.7.	Lost/unknown location					
Asmacık			XII.8.	Gaziantep Museum of Archaeology	5596				
Tünp 2			XII.9.	Gaziantep Museum of Archaeology	3955				II 154
Nineveh 1		Nineveh	XII.10.	British Museum	128335				II 321
Nineveh 2		Nineveh	XII.11.	Lost/unknown location					II 322
Gelb			XII.12.	Lost/unknown location					
Alişar ostracon			XII.13.	Lost/unknown location					II 61
Tragana (Locris)			XII.14.	Archaeological Museum of Lamia	M 3510				
Nimrud			XII.15.	Lost/unknown location					
Persepolis			XII.16.	Lost/unknown location					II 327
Potoroo			XII.						
Miletos			XII.						
Urfa 1			XII.						
Urfa 2			XII.						
Urfa 3			XII.						
Pancarlı			XII.19.						
Lidar bullae			XIII.1.	Şanlıurfa Museum	Li. 85–F. 246–247 (field nos.)				
Malatya bulla (Malatya 15)			XIII.2.	Lost/unknown location					
Zincirli signet			XIII.3.						
Porada seal			XIII.4.	Morgan Library & Museum	?	XLI.1			
Delaporte seal			XIII.5.	Bibliothèque nationale de France	?	XLIII.8			
Borowski seal 1			XIII.6.	Bible Lands Museum Jerusalem	Lam. 1102				
Nineveh seal			XIII.7.	British Museum	120243	XXXIX.10			
Hogarth seal 1			XIII.8.	Ashmolean Museum	1913.769				
Hogarth seal 2			XIII.9.	Ashmolean Museum	1913.175				
Gulbenkian seal			XIII.10.	University of Durham, Gulbenkian Museum of Modern Art	NH2303				
Gelb seals			XIII.11a–c.						
Nineveh bullae 1–7			XIII.12.	British Museum	84584; 84585; 84587; 84588; 84589; 84590; 84591	XXXIX.3–9			
Khorsabad bullae			XIII.13.	Institute for the Study of Ancient Cultures	(field) DS 1932:25; A7037			39	
Borowski seal 2			XIII.14.	Bible Lands Museum Jerusalem	Lam. 1101				
Hogarth seal 3			XIII.15.	Ashmolean Museum	1912.971				
De Clercq seal			XIII.16.	Lost/unknown location					
Dülük seal			XIII.17.	Museum of the Ancient Orient	?				
Gaziantep seal			XIII.18.	Museum of the Ancient Orient	?				
Bossert seal			XIII.19.	Lost/unknown location					
Vollenweider seal			XIII.20.	Museum of Art and History	1950/19217				
Yale seal			XIII.21.	Yale University	NCBS 890				
Tell Tayinat seals			XIII.						
Christies seal			XIII.						
Karkamış N3			XIII.						
Sirkeli (rock inscription)		Empire inscriptions	XIV.1.	Rock reliefs etc. in situ					
Fıraktın relief		Empire inscriptions	XIV.2.	Rock reliefs etc. in situ					
Aleppo 1 (building block)		Empire inscriptions	XIV.3.						
Emirgazi 1 (altars A–D)		Empire inscriptions	XIV.4.	Museum of the Ancient Orient					
Emirgazi 2 (base)		Empire inscriptions	XIV.5.						
Emirgazi 3 (fragment)		Empire inscriptions	XIV.6.						
Yalburt (sanctuary inscription)		Empire inscriptions	XIV.7.						
Karakuyu (sanctuary inscription)		Empire inscriptions	XIV.8.						
Boğazköy 3 (stele)		Empire inscriptions	XIV.9a.						
Boğazköy 18 (stele)		Empire inscriptions	XIV.9b.						
Boğazköy 24 (stele)		Empire inscriptions	XIV.9c.						
Delihasanlı (stele)		Empire inscriptions	XIV.9d.						
Boğazköy 19 (epigraph)		Empire inscriptions	XIV.10.						
Karabel relief		Empire inscriptions	XIV.11a.	Rock reliefs etc. in situ					
"Tarkondemos" (seal)		Empire inscriptions	XIV.11b.	Walters Art Museum					
Boğazköy sealings		Empire inscriptions	XIV.11c.						
Hatip (rock inscription)		Empire inscriptions	XIV.12.	Rock reliefs etc. in situ					
Boğazköy 21 (Südburg, building inscription) + 20 (epigraph)		Empire inscriptions	XIV.13.	Rock reliefs etc. in situ					
Boğazköy 5 (Nişantaş, rock inscription)		Empire inscriptions	XIV.14.	Rock reliefs etc. in situ					
Köylütolu Yayla (base)		Empire inscriptions	XIV.15.						
Boğazköy 12 (Quellgrotte stele)		Empire inscriptions	XIV.16.						
Kocaoğuz (stele; transitional?)		Empire inscriptions	XIV.17.						
Boğazköy 6, 7, 9–11, 13, 23.1–3, 25, 27 (fragments)		Empire inscriptions	XIV.18.						
Karakuyu (Torbalı) (stele fragment)		Empire inscriptions	XIV.19.						
Tell Açana 1 (orthostat)		Empire inscriptions	XIV.20a.						
Tell Açana 1 (bulla)		Empire inscriptions	XIV.20b.						
Boğazköy 2 (base)		Empire inscriptions	XIV.21.	Museum of the Ancient Orient					
Boğazköy 1 (base)		Empire inscriptions	XIV.22.	Museum of the Ancient Orient					
Boğazköy 4 (sphinx graffito)		Empire inscriptions	XIV.23.						
Boğazköy 16 (Lion Gate graffito)		Empire inscriptions	XIV.24.						
Boğazköy 8, 14, 15, 17, 22, 26 (scribal graffiti)		Empire inscriptions	XIV.25.						
Kınık (bowl inscription)		Empire inscriptions	XIV.26.						
Ankara 3 (bowl inscription)		Empire inscriptions	XIV.27.						
Ankara 2 (bowl inscriptions; transitional?)		Empire inscriptions	XIV.28.						
Taşçı reliefs		Empire inscriptions	XIV.29.	Rock reliefs etc. in situ					
İmamkulu (rock inscriptions)		Empire inscriptions	XIV.30.	Rock reliefs etc. in situ					
Hanyeri relief		Empire inscriptions	XIV.31.	Rock reliefs etc. in situ					
Hemite relief		Empire inscriptions	XIV.32.	Rock reliefs etc. in situ					
Manisa relief		Empire inscriptions	XIV.33.	Rock reliefs etc. in situ					
Çağdın (stele)		Empire inscriptions	XIV.34.						
Karga (stele)		Empire inscriptions	XIV.35.						
Malkaya (graffiti)		Empire inscriptions	XIV.36.						
Çalapverdi 4 (stele)		Empire inscriptions	XIV.37.						
Latmos (graffiti)		Empire inscriptions	XIV.38.						
Altıntepe pithoi			App. 4						III – Add. 121a

== Bibliography ==
- George, Andrew; Weeden, Mark (2024). "PROFESSOR J. D. HAWKINS, MA, FBA (1940–2023)" (PDF). Iraq. 86: 3–5. doi:10.1017/irq.2025.1. ISSN 0021-0889.
- Barnett, Richard David (1953). "Karatepe, the Key to the Hittite Hieroglyphs". Anatolian Studies. 3: 53–95. doi:10.2307/3642387. ISSN 0066-1546.
- Payne, Annick (2014). Hieroglyphic Luwian: an introduction with original texts. Wiesbaden: Harrassowitz. ISBN 978-3-447-06109-4.
