= Karahüyük (Elbistan) =

Village in Turkey

Coordinates: 38.261634°N 37.113965°E

Karahüyük (Elbistan) (also known as Karahöyük, Karahoyuk) is a village of Elbistan district of Kahramanmaraş province of Turkey. It is located 169 km to the north from Kahramanmaraş city and 9 km northwest from the Elbistan town.

In 1947, an important Anatolian hieroglyphic inscription stele was discovered near the village. This stele is believed to be from the 12th century BC.

The plain of Elbistan shares some history with Arslantepe (Melid). It is believed that Elbistan came under the control of Melid sometime around the 12th century BC. The Malatya group of the Neo-Hittite Hieroglyphic Luwian inscriptions have been studied by scholars. They come from the area of Karahöyük, and are believed to be very ancient.

Archaeological excavations have also been conducted at Hamza Tepe, which is in the same area, 10 km northwest of Elbistan town, and to the west of Karahöyük. An ancient cremation cemetery from the Middle Iron Age (8th-7th centuries BC) has been discovered there.

The IZGIN hieroglyphic stele was also found in the area. It was found in 1882 in a cemetery near Izgın village. It was found actually standing among the monuments in that cemetery.

== See also ==
- Hittites
- Maraş lion
- Kahramanmaraş Archaeology Museum

== Literature ==
- Hawkins, J. D. Corpus of Hieroglyphic Luwian Inscriptions, Vol 1, Berlin, 2000: 288-95 and plt. 133–34.
- Hawkins, J. D. "The Historical Significance of the Karahöyük (Elbistan) Stele," FsNÖzgüç, 1993: 273–79.
- Hawkins, J. D. Corpus of Hieroglyphic Luwian Inscriptions, Vol 3, Berlin, 2024: 230–31, 325.
- Masson, E. "La stèle de Karahöyük-Elbistan: nouvel examen," FsLaroche, 1979: 225–41.
- Özgüç T., Özgüç N. Türk Tarih Kurumu tarafından yapılan Karahöyük hafriyatı raporu 1947, Ankara, TTK, 1949.
- Woudhuizen, F. C. “The Luwian Hieroglyphic Inscription on the Stele from Karahöyük-Elbistan.” Ancient West & East 2/2, 2003: 211–24.
- van Quickelberghe, E. "Réflexions Autour de la Stèle de Karahöyük (Elbistan),” Le Muséon: Revue d’Études Orientales 126/3–4, 2013: 253–63.
