= Taşçı reliefs =

Coordinates: 38.1987°N 35.7811°E

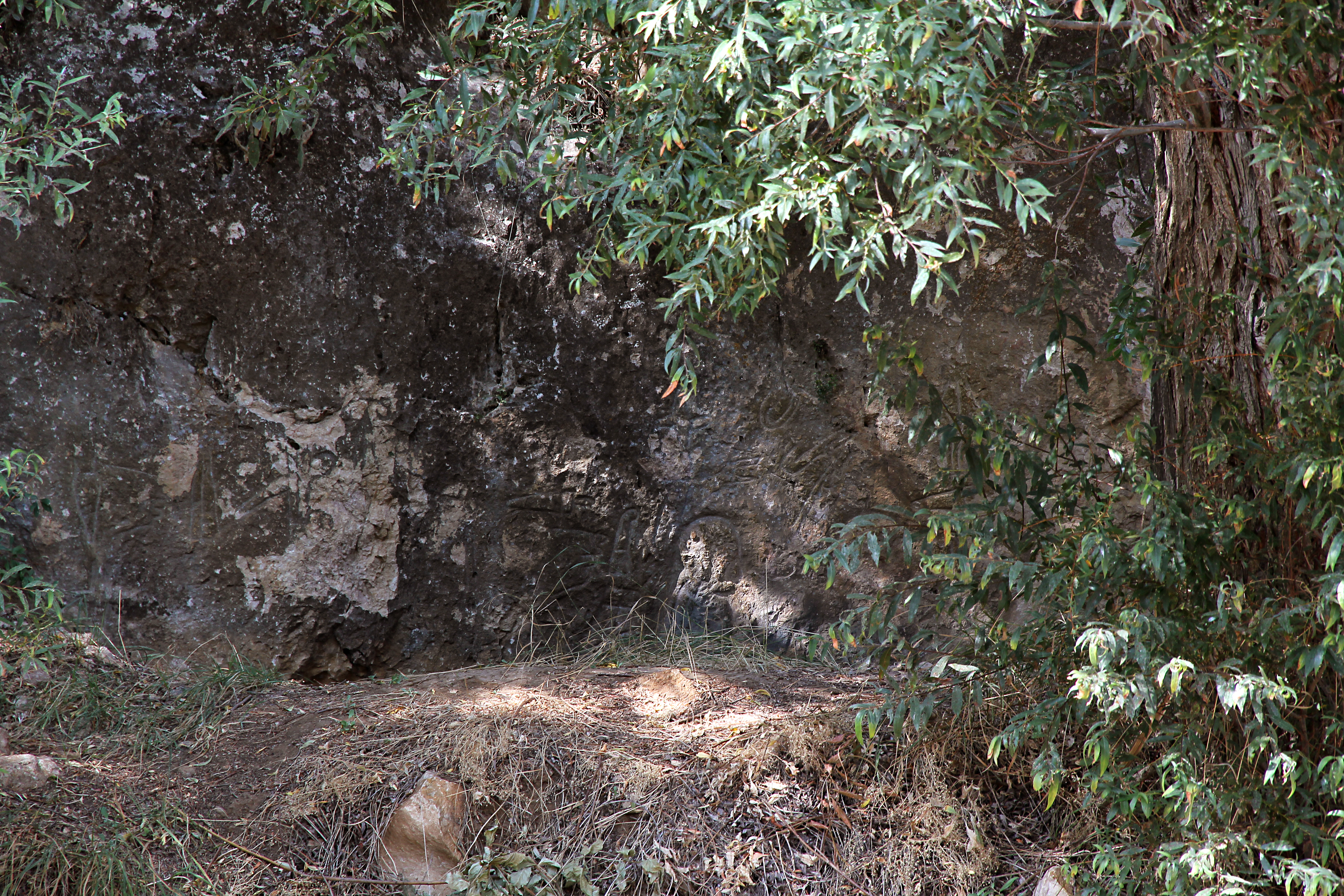
Taşçı A

Location of the Taşçı reliefs in Turkey

The two Taşçı reliefs are rock reliefs from the time of the Hittite empire. They are two kilometres south of Taşçı in Develi district, Kayseri Province, Turkey. They are known in Turkish as Yazılı Kaya ("Inscribed cliffs"). Rock reliefs are a prominent aspect of Hittite art.

== Location ==
At Taşçı, the Zamantı Irmağı River is joined by the Şamaz Dere River, also referred to as the Homur Suyu, which originates from Bakırdağ to the south. At this spot the river passes through a narrow gorge with steep cliffs on either side; the two reliefs known as Taşçı A and B are on the left bank, les than a hundred metres apart. No travel route can have passed through the gorge at the time when the reliefs were created, since the creation of the modern road required advanced stone blasting work. This, the location by the water, and the presence of caves above the reliefs suggests the site had a ritual function.

== Taşçı A ==
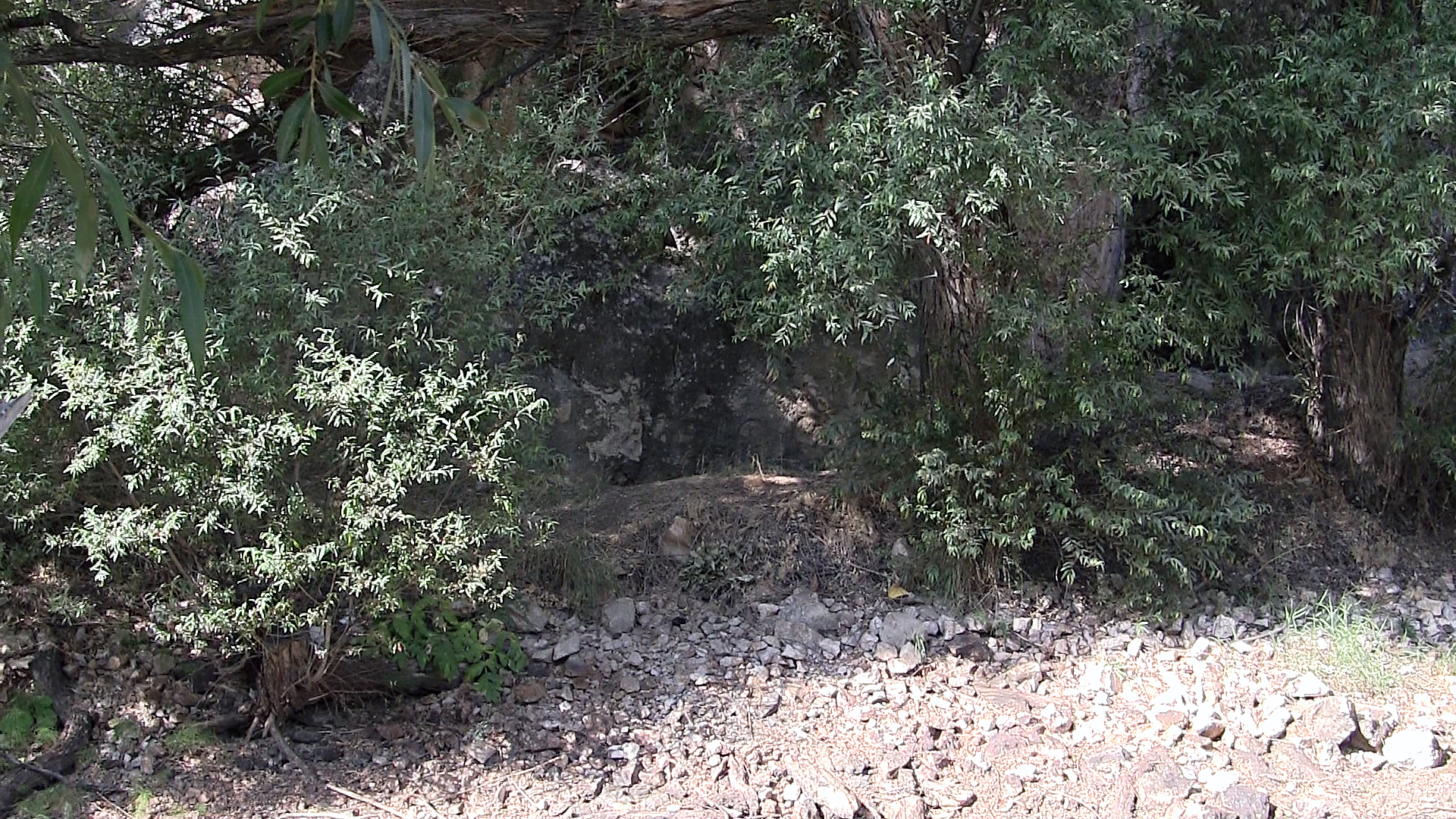
Setting of Taşçı A from the opposite bank

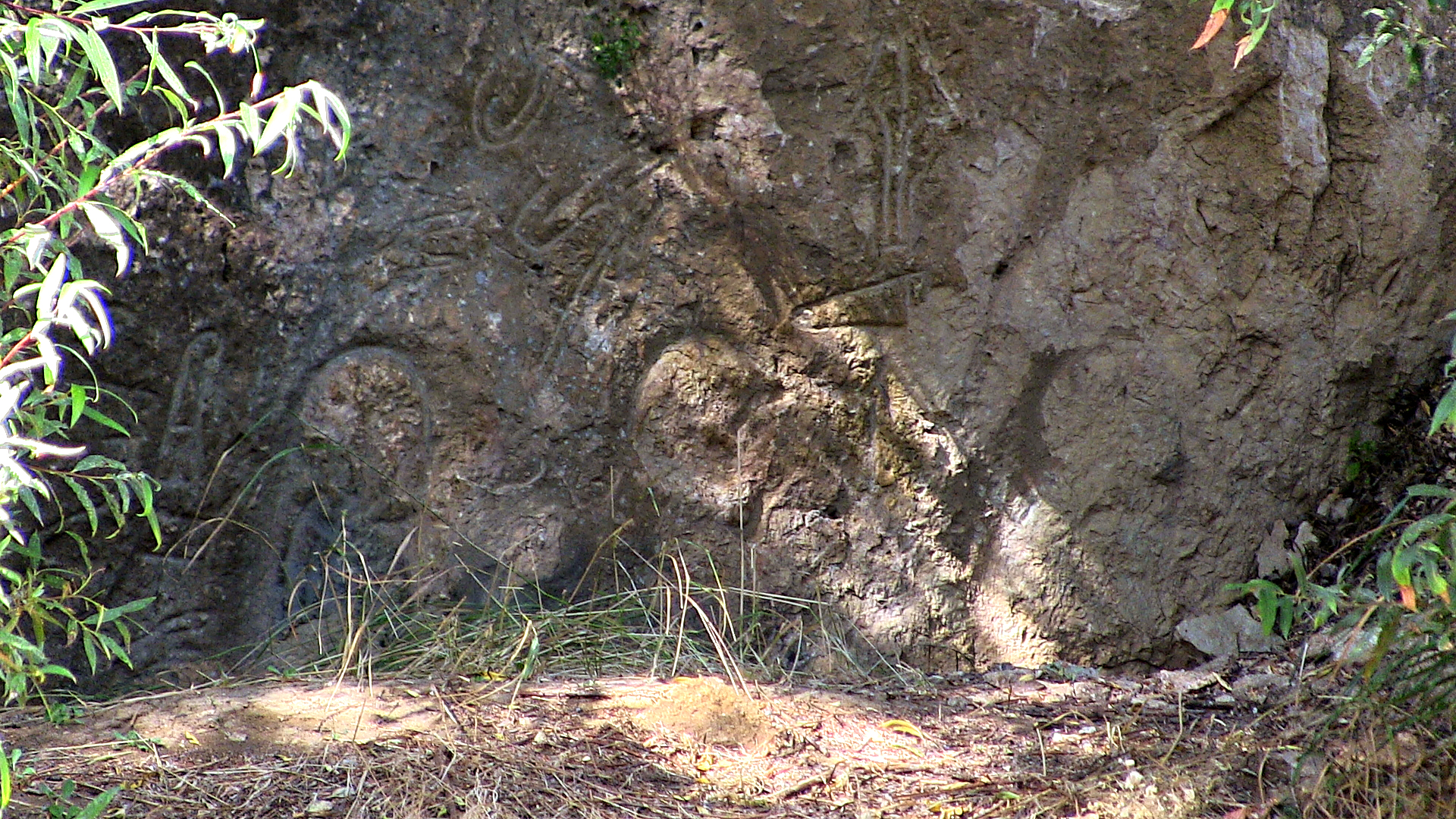
Detail of Taşçı A: the three figures and the inscription

The north relief, Taşçı A, lies near the bank, about two metres above the water level, and now rises less than a metre above the soil which has built up around about. On the right hand side, it shows three robed figures facing right, who are covered by soil up to their hips. Their outlines are marked with depp grooves. The left figure is the best preserved - he is the only one where internal details can be made out. Ribbons run over their heads, a cloth hangs over their backs; from these details the figure appears to be female. Her eyes and chin are still visible, the nose and mouth area is broken. The two left figures each extend an arm; according to the 1939 sketch by Ignace Gelb, the right figure had the same posture, but this cannot be seen any more on account of heavy weathering. The central and right figures, who wear round caps, are only visible as silhouettes. All three figures are generally interpreted as priests.

Above the heads are inscriptions in Luwian hieroglyphs; the symbols on the left can be grouped together, while the symbols on the right are not preserved. Their poor condition makes them difficult to read. Only the name of the left, female figure can be read, as "Ma-na-a-za/i". She is further identified as the "daughter of Lubakkis, the son of the military scribe." Another group of hieroglyphs are located to the left of the three figures, which name another person - John David Hawkins reads "Bodyguard Zida, servant of Hattusili, the Great King, the hero." This Zida is not depicted, but he is probably the creator of the relief.

== Taşçı B ==
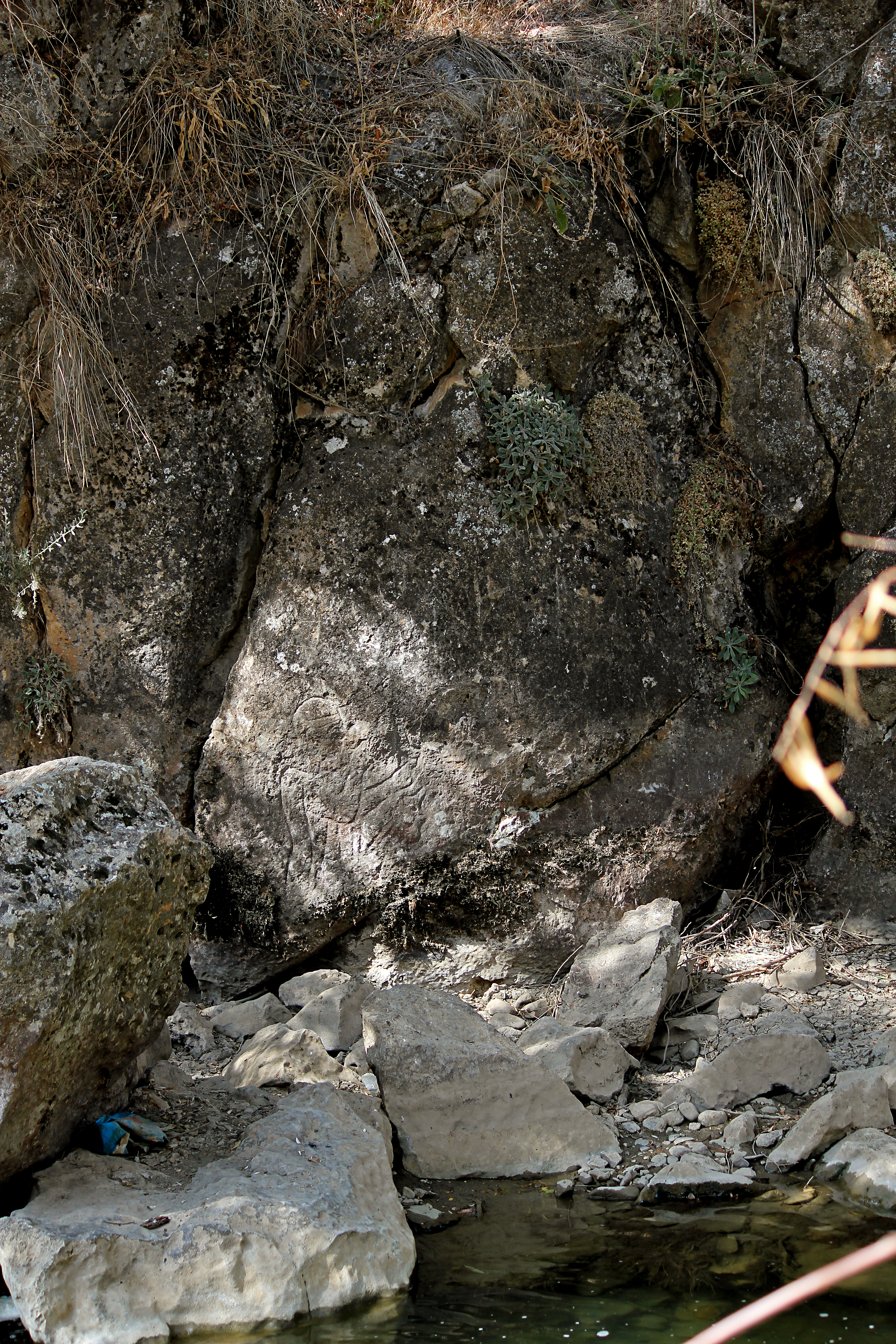
Setting of Taşçı B on the west bank

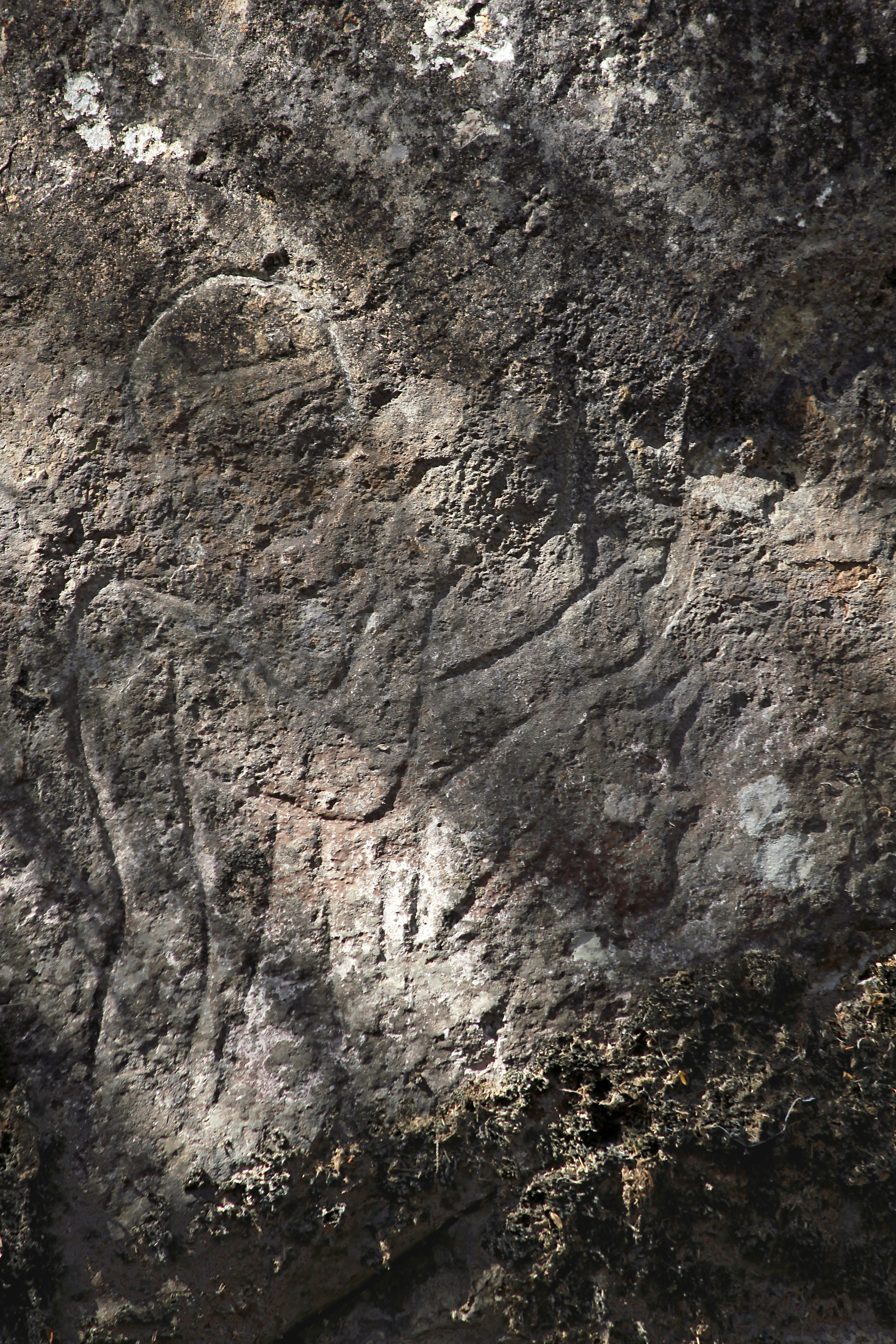
Taşçı B

Less than 100 metres upstream is Taşçı B on a boulder which is right on the bank and is covered by water when the water level is high. The relief depicts a male figure facing right. He wears a round cap with a horn, the long robes of a priest and a stole which hangs over his shoulders. His right hand is held in pose of greeting, his left is stretched out. A holy symbol which is reserved for actual gods can be seen above. Three hieroglyphs below his arms have been read in differing ways by different researcher, but his name cannot be made out.

== Interpretation ==
There is a cave in the cliff-face above Taşçı A, from which a shaft descends vertically. It is now filled with soil, but it probably reached the water level. There is also a cave in the cliff face behind Taşçı B, with a similar shaft. The two caves and the location of the reliefs by the water suggest that the place had a ritual function. The orientation of the priestly figure upstream, in the direction of the fields at water level suggests that they performed a protective role for the surrounding area and for a (presumed) settlement in the area.

The reliefs are dated to around the 13th century BC by their inscriptions.

== Research history ==
A short description and first reading of Taşçı A were published by Hans Rott and Leopold Messerschmidt after Rott's visit to Anatolia in 1906. Guillaume de Jerphanion produced another account in the same year. Ignace Gelb uncovered the lower part of the relief in 1935 and published a sketch and a photograph. Taşçı B was first described by Sedat Alp and Ekrem Akurgal in 1947. Subsequently, Hans Gustav Güterbock visited the place in 1954. The first published account of both reliefs was produced by Piero Meriggi in 1975, after his first trip to Anatolia. His understanding of the inscriptions agreed closely with that of Gelb, unlike the work of Franz Steinherr published in the same year. The latter was followed by Markus Wäfler. Another account was published by Kay Kohlmeyer in 1983 and finally Horst Ehringhaus published a description in 2003.

== Bibliography ==
- Kay Kohlmeyer. "Felsbilder der hethitischen Großreichszeit." Acta Praehistorica et Archaeologica 15 (1983) pp. 74–80.
- Horst Ehringhaus. Götter, Herrscher, Inschriften. Die Felsreliefs der hethitischen Großreichszeit in der Türkei. Zabern, Mainz 2005, ISBN 3-8053-3469-9, pp. 65–70.
