= Kızıldağ National Park =

National park in Isparta, Turkey

- Kızıldağ Milli Parkı
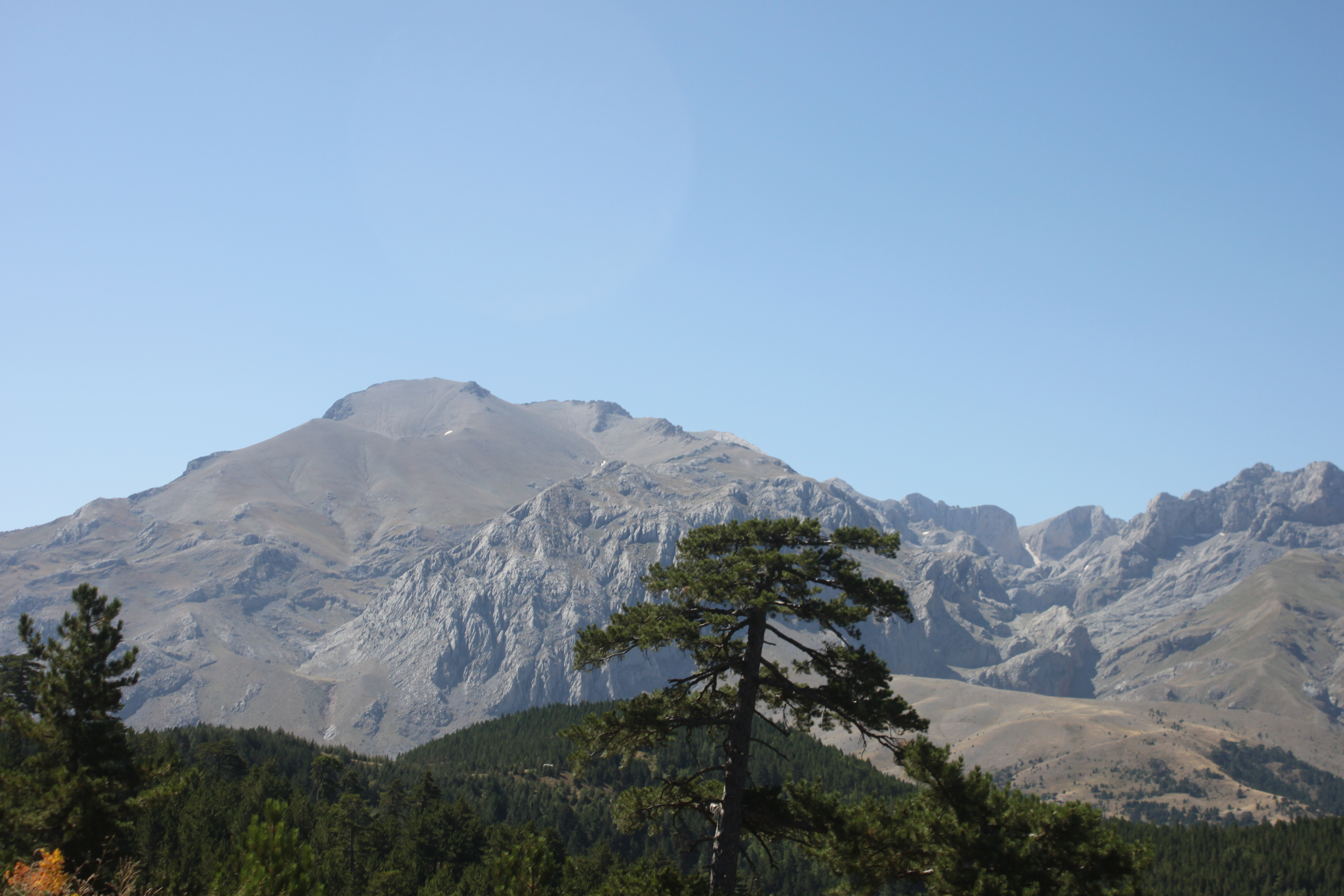

- Location within Turkey
- Location: Yenişarbademli-Şarkikaraağaç-Aksu, Isparta Province, Turkey
- Coordinates: 38°03′03″N 31°22′13″E
- Area: 55,106 ha (136,170 acres)
- Established: May 19, 1969
- Governing body: Ministry of Forest and Water Management
- Website: www.milliparklar.gov.tr/mp/kizildag/index.htm

Kızıldağ National Park (Turkish: Kızıldağ Milli Parkı), established on May 19, 1969, is a national park in southern Turkey. It is located in the Yenişarbademli-Şarkikaraağaç-Aksu districts of Isparta Province.

== Gallery ==
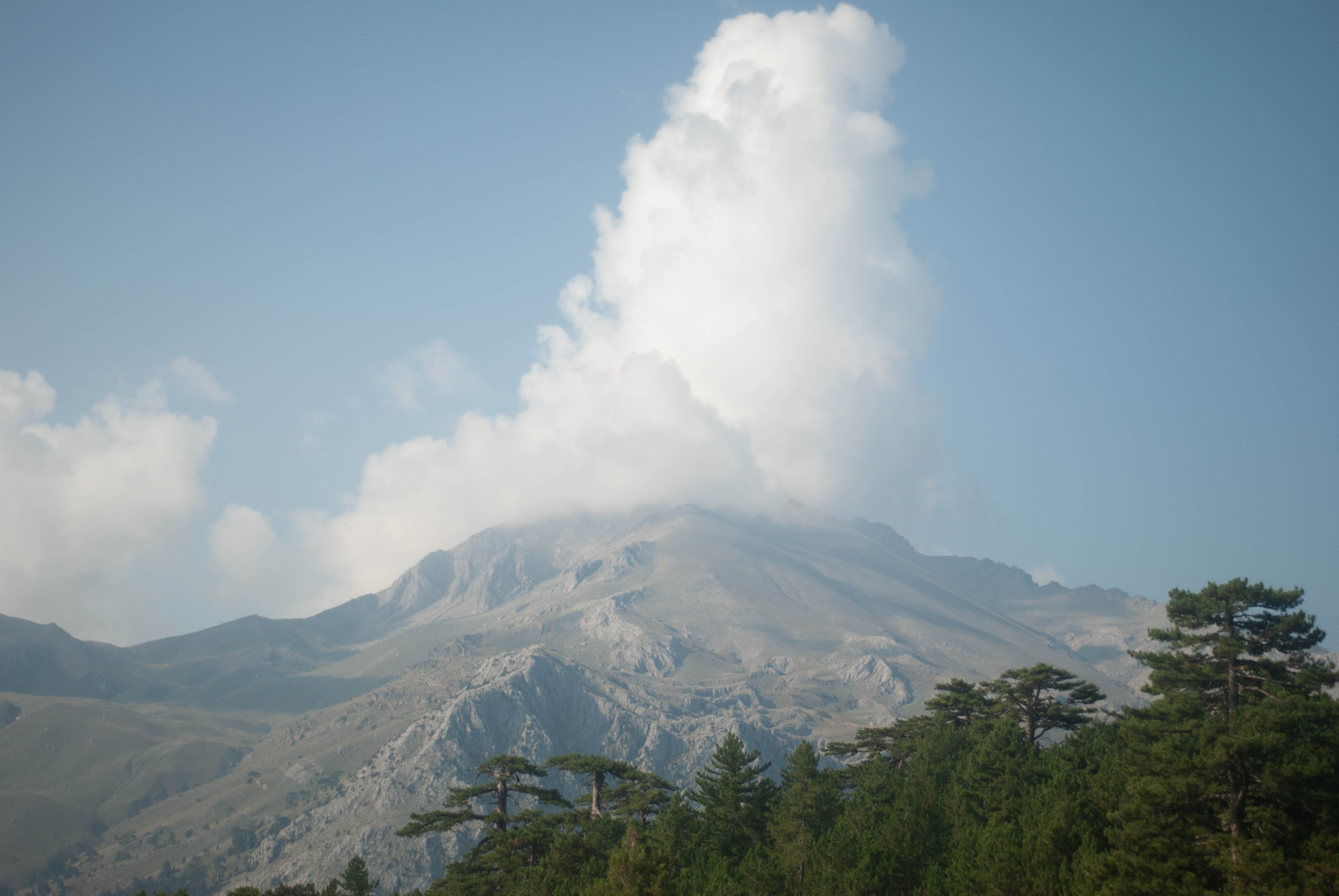

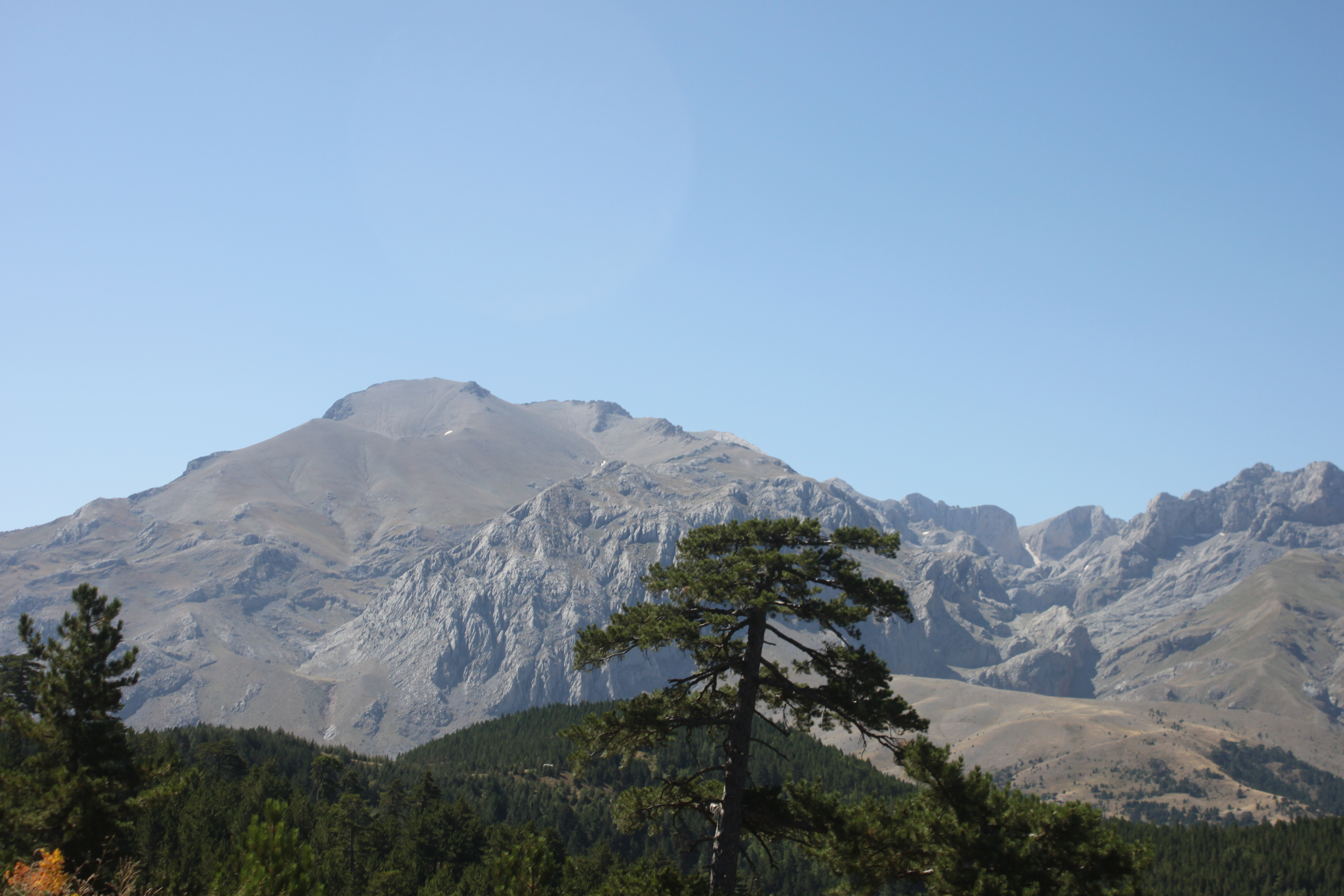

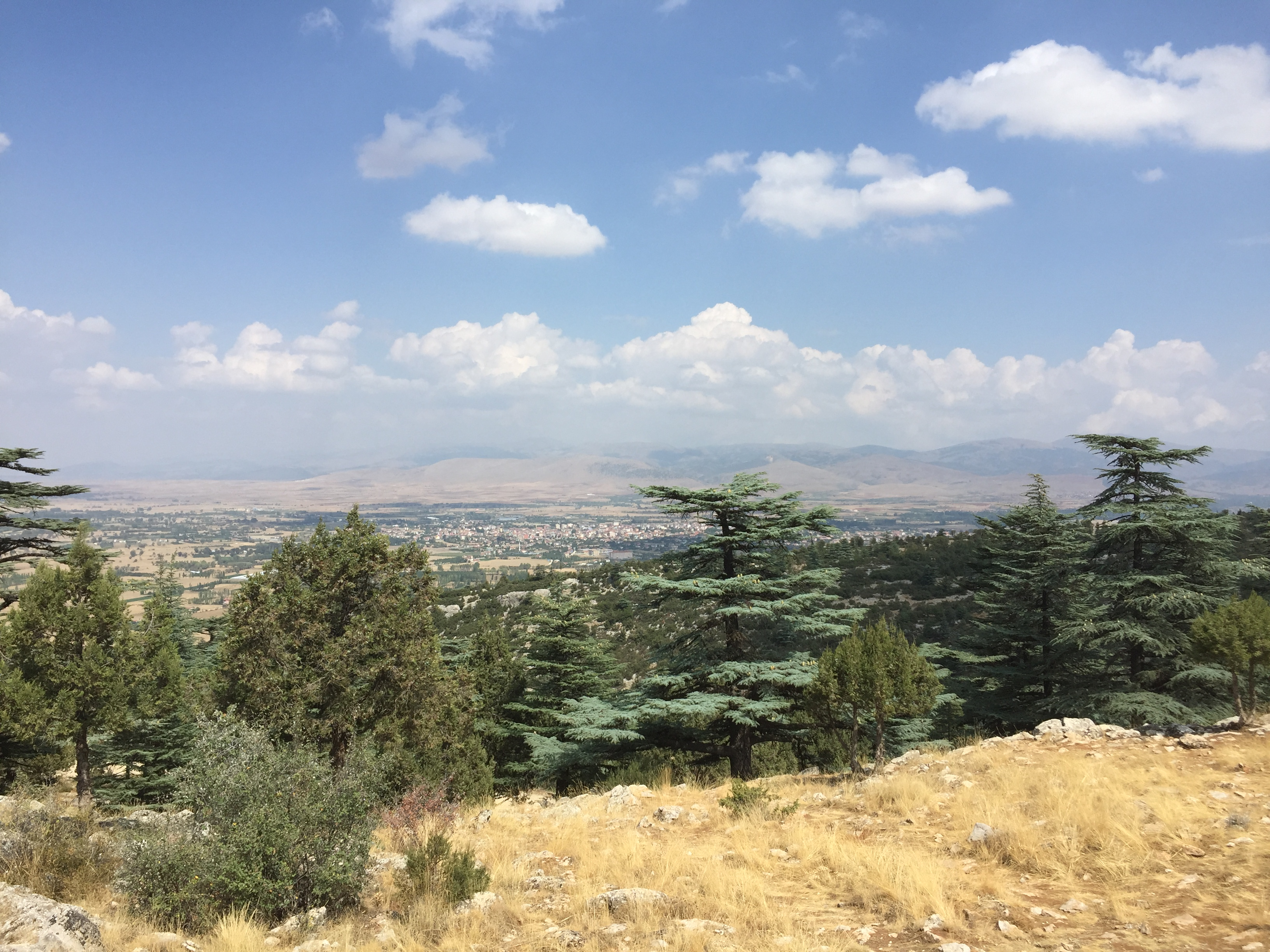

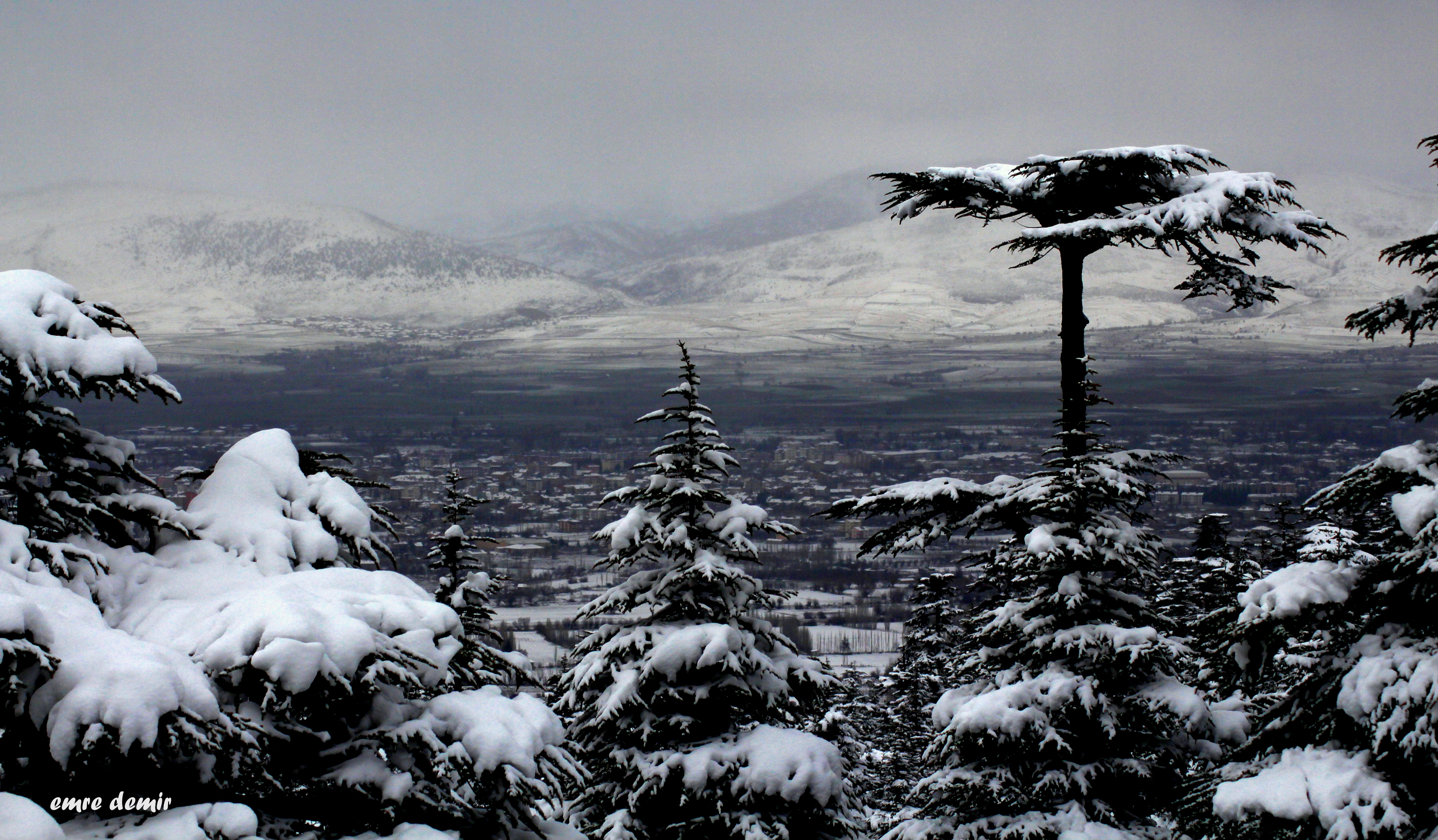

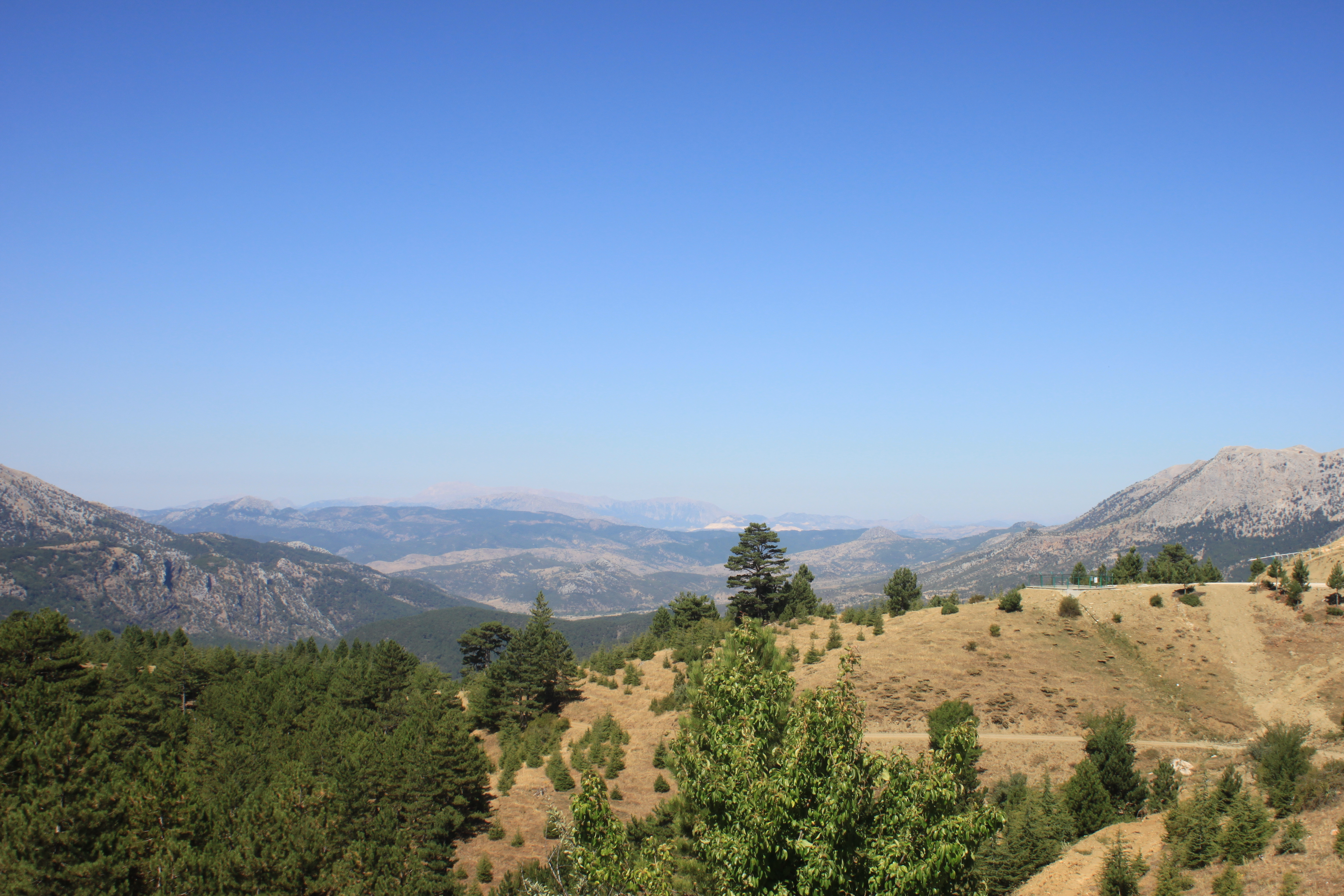
