= Gaziantep Museum of Archaeology =

Turkish archaeological museum

- Gaziantep Arkeoloji Müzesi
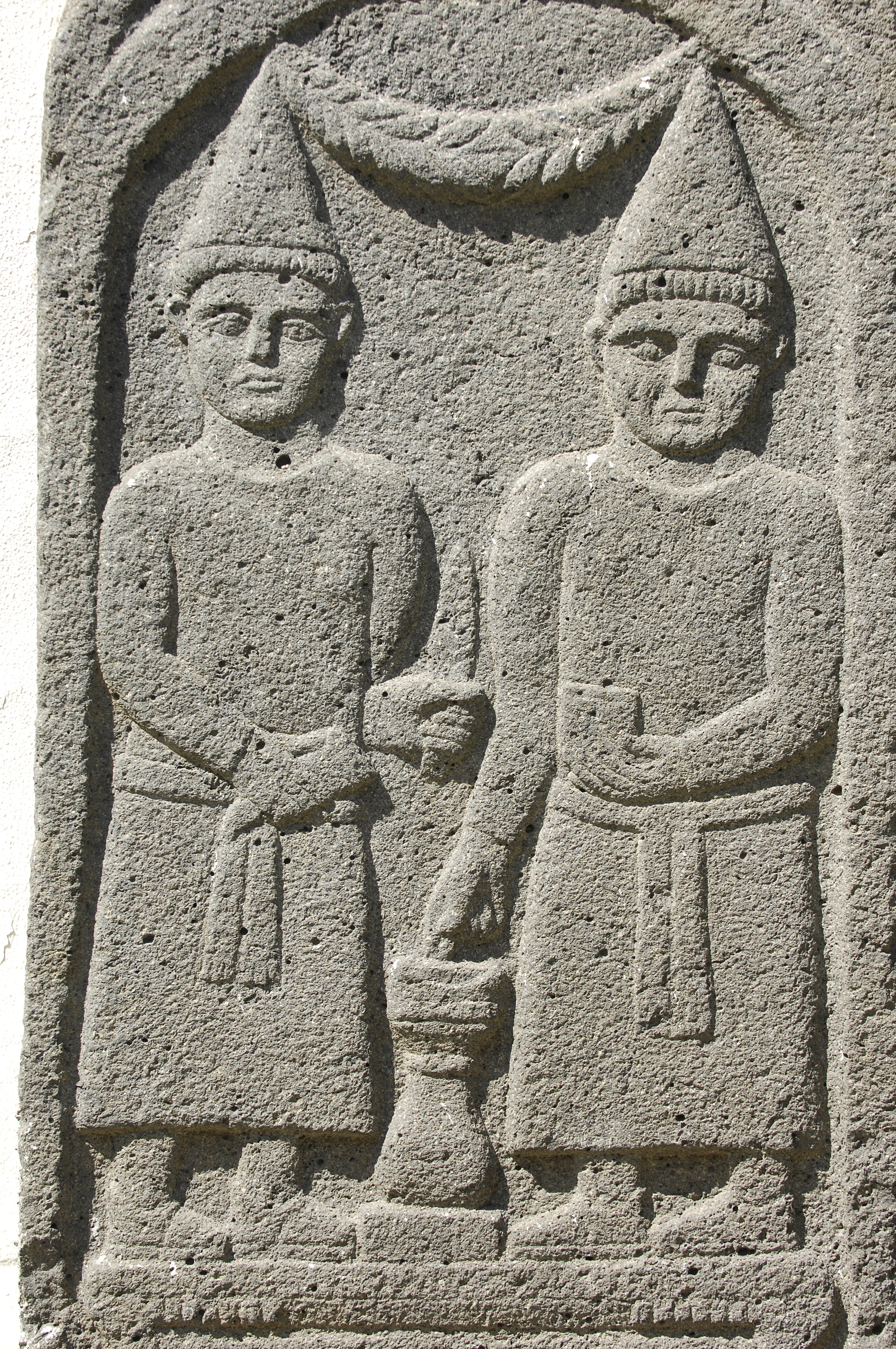
- Two priests on a funerary stele, basalt, Roman 2nd century AD.
- Established: 2005
- Location: Gaziantep, Turkey
- Coordinates: 37.06626°N 37.37826°E
- Type: Archaeology
- Public transit access: Gaziantep railway station
- Website: https://muze.gov.tr/muze-detay?SectionId=GZA01&DistId=MRK

The Gaziantep Museum of Archaeology (Turkish: Gaziantep Arkeoloji Müzesi) is an archaeological museum located in the city of Gaziantep, Turkey. It housed for some years a collection of mosaics, most of which were excavated from the ancient Roman city site of Zeugma. A new museum, the Zeugma Mosaic Museum now houses those. After an overhaul of the displays the museum now houses a fine collection of finds from the region. Exhibits include a collection of Paleolithic artifacts; items from a Bronze Age necropolis; Hittite, Persian, Roman, Hellenistic, and Commagene artworks and glassware; Ottoman and Islamic coins and medallions; and the skeleton of a mammoth. Attached to the museum is a garden containing a selection of stone artifacts, including pagan tombstones from Zeugma, Christian tombstones, and Hittite statuary.

The museum in its current form dates from 2005, when it was substantially enlarged to house the newly discovered Zeugma mosaics.

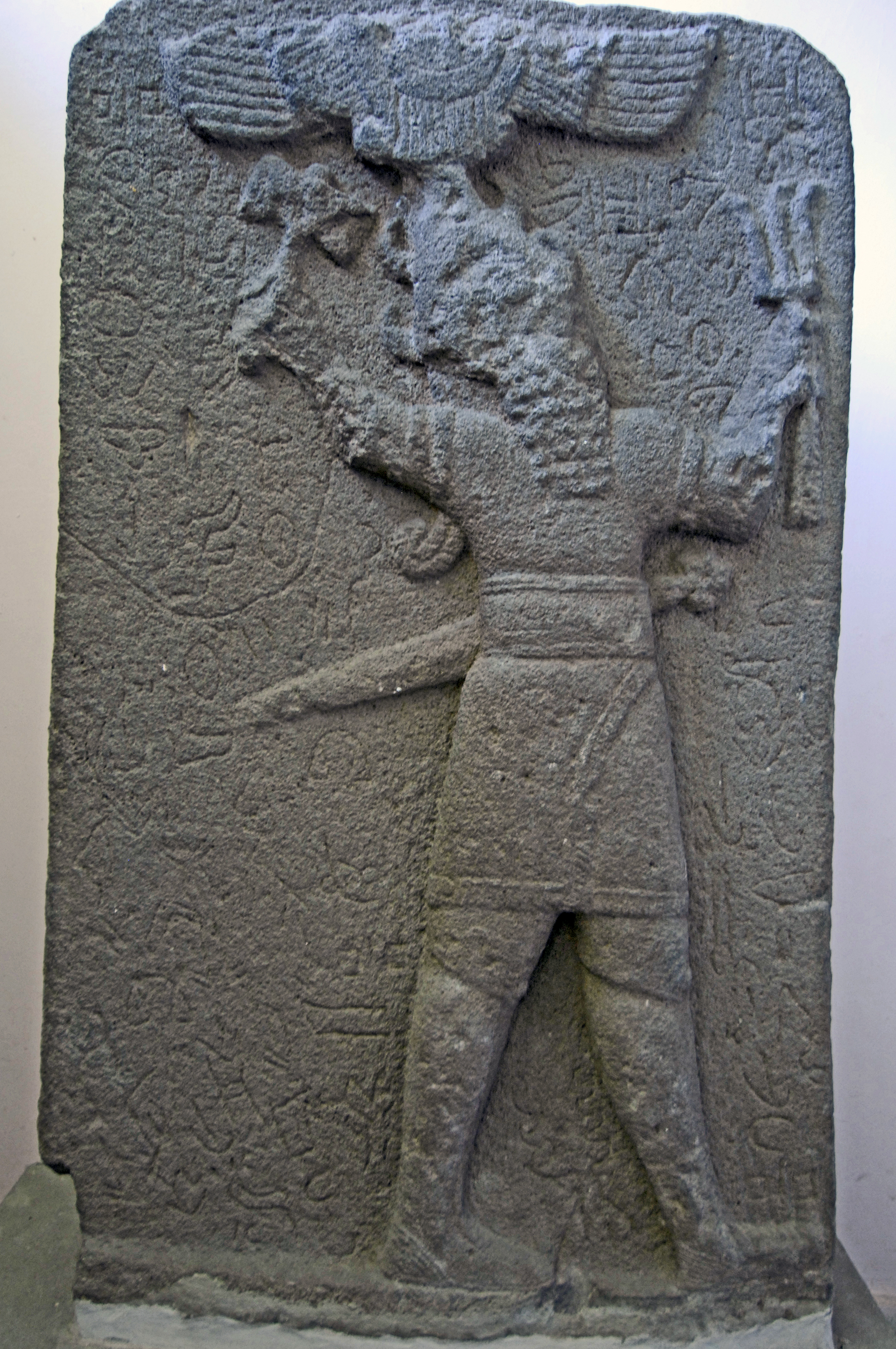
Gaziantep Archaeological Museum Hittite stele

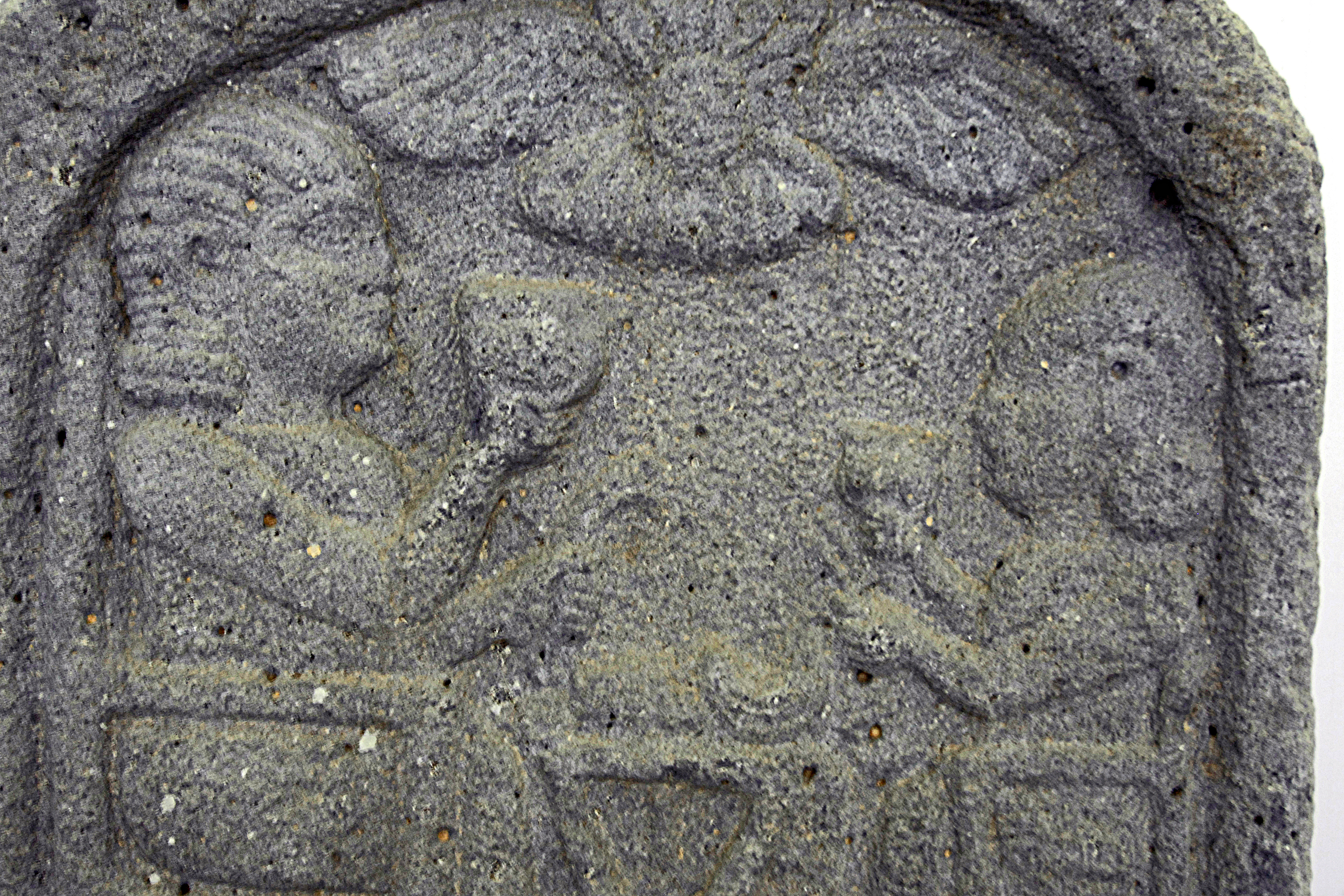
Gaziantep Archaeological Museum Aramean banquet

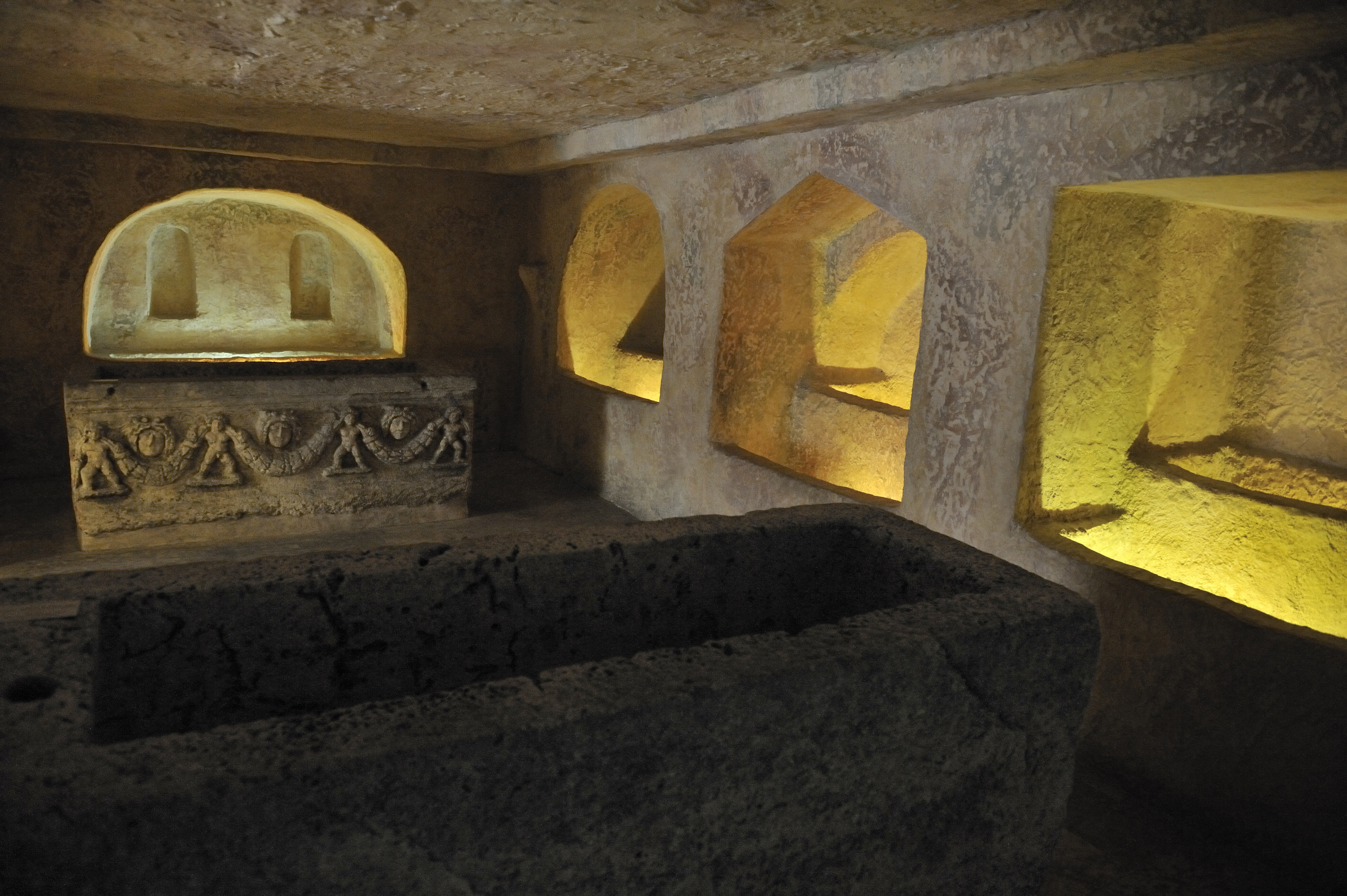
Gaziantep Archaeological Museum Grave replica

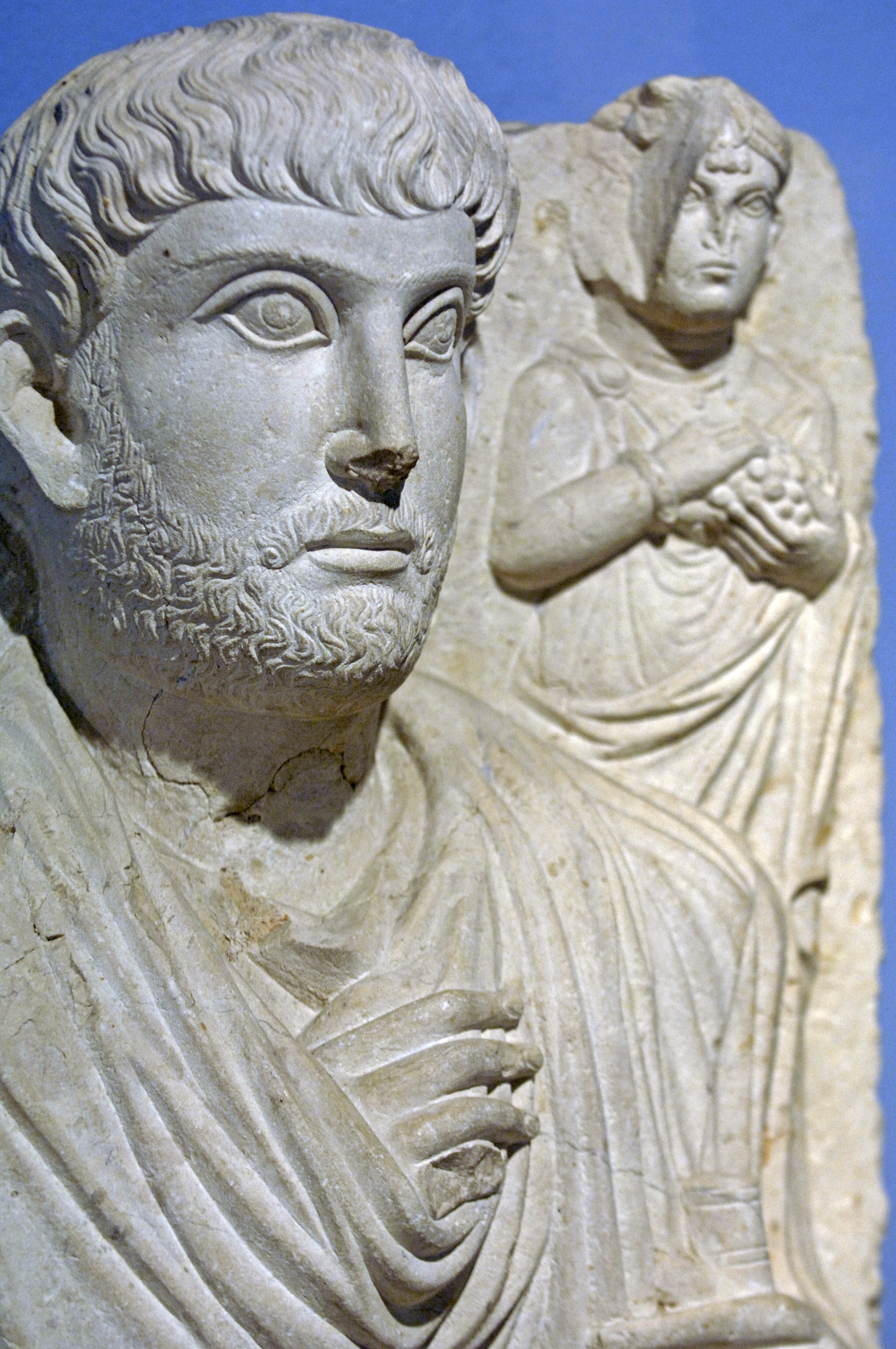
Gaziantep Archaeological Museum Palmyra type grave figure

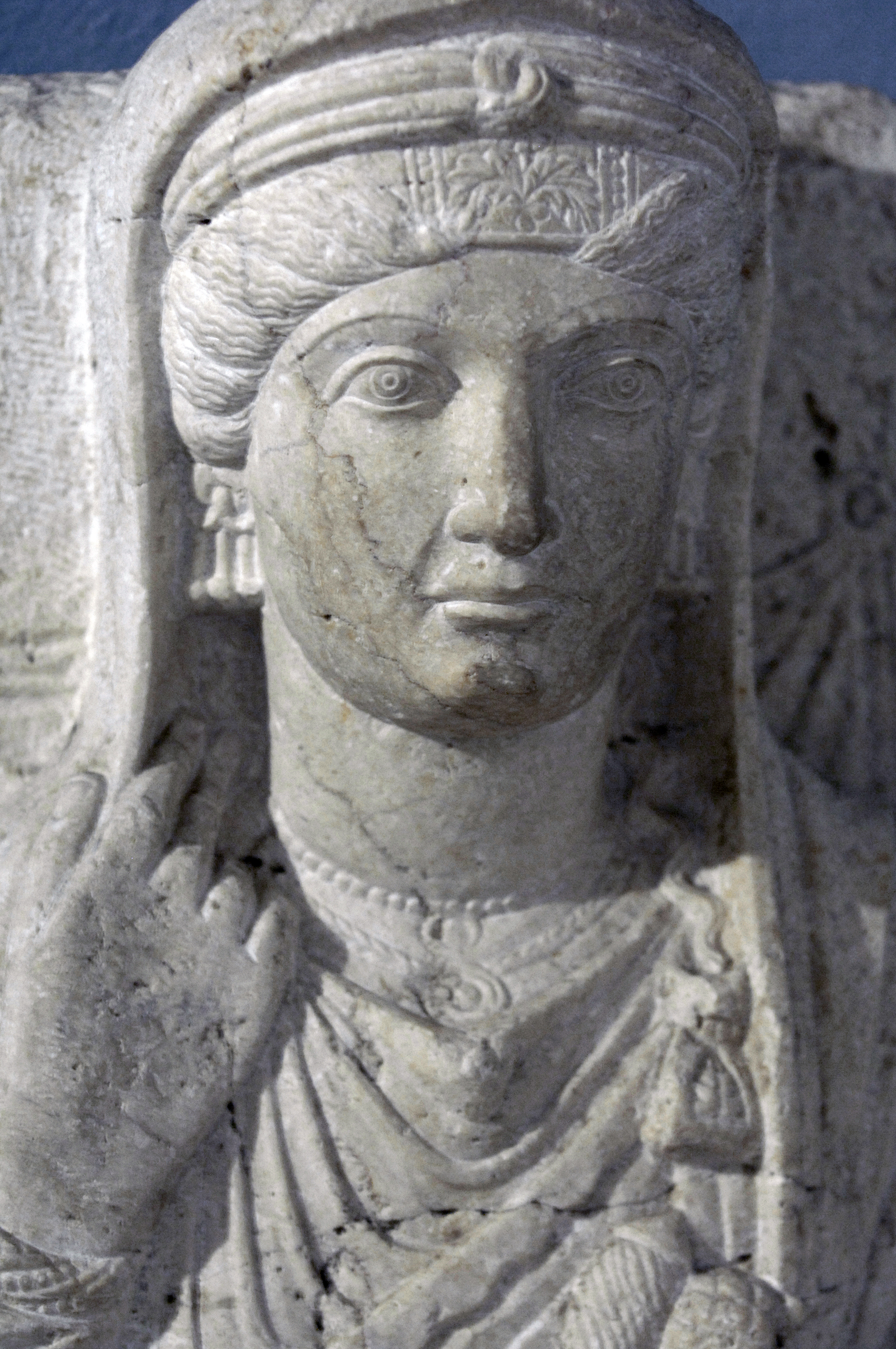
Gaziantep Archaeological Museum Palmyra type grave figure

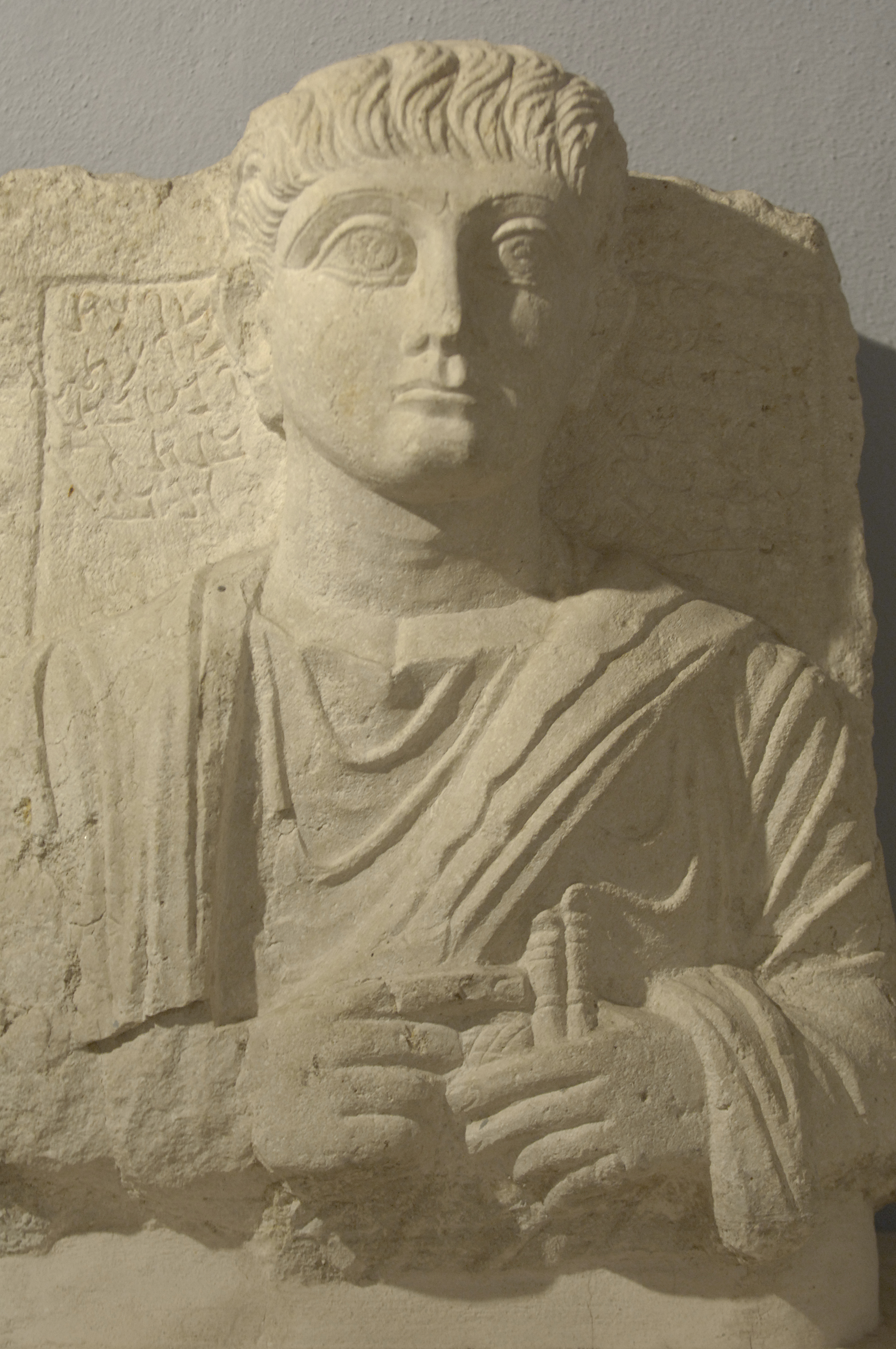
Gaziantep Archaeological Museum Palmyra type grave figure

== See also ==
- Zeugma Mosaic Museum
- Yesemek Quarry and Sculpture Workshop
