= Malatya Museum =

Museum in Malatya, Turkey

- Malatya Müzesi
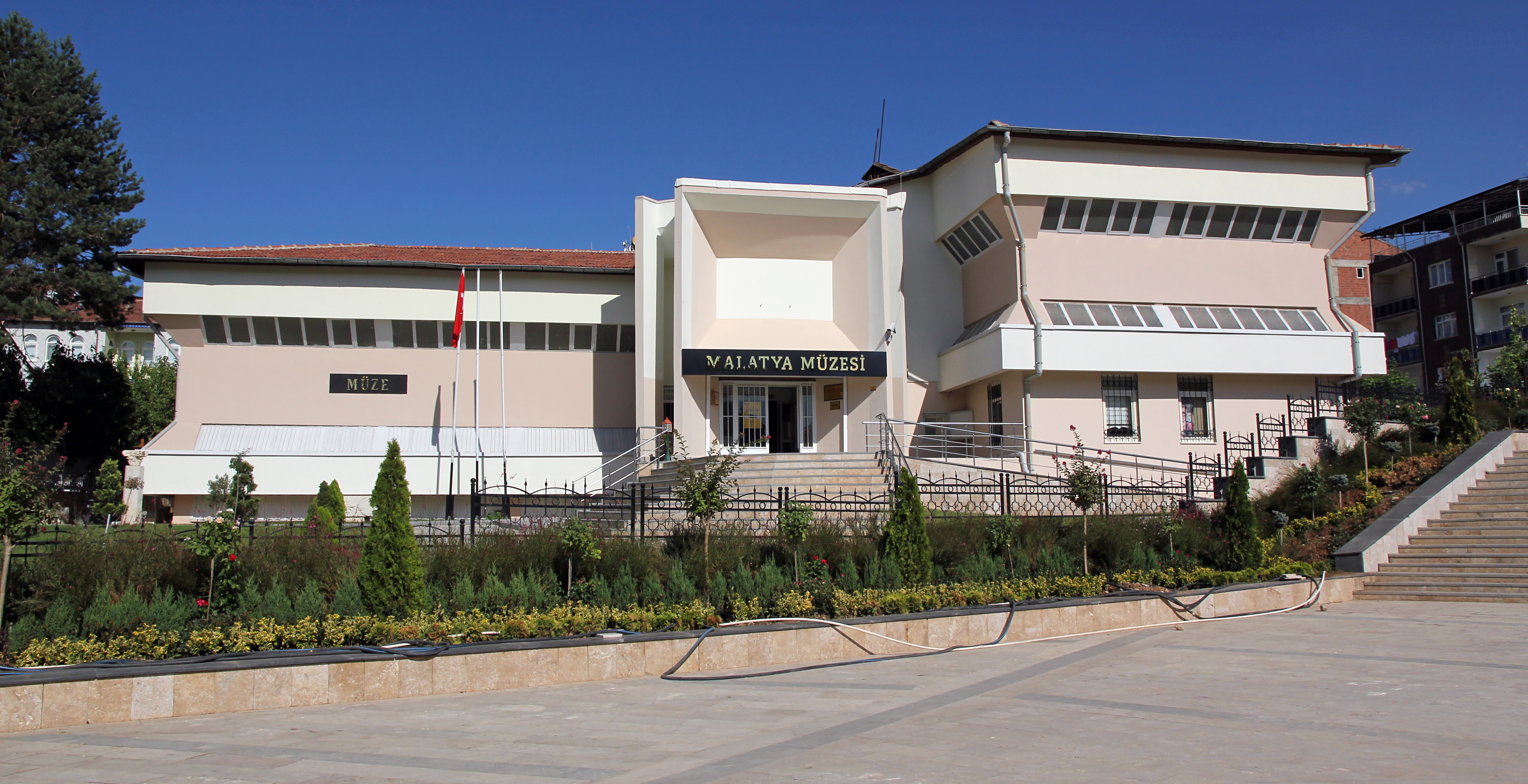

- Malatya Museum
- Established: 1979; 47 years ago
- Coordinates: 38°20′36″N 38°19′26″E
- Type: Archaeology, Ethnography
- Collections: neolithic, chalcolithic, bronze Age, Hittites, Urartu, Roman Empire, Byzantine Empire, Anatolian Seljuks, Anatolian Beyliks, Ottoman Empire.
- Collection size: 15887
- Owner: Ministry of Culture

Malatya Museum (Turkish: Malatya Müzesi) is a museum in Malatya, Turkey

The museum faces Kernek square in Malatya at 38°20′36″N 38°19′26″E

Although a smaller museum was established in 1971, the present museum building was opened in 1979.

Majority of the items in the museum are from various excavations like Arslantepe (Melid), Pirot, Caferhöyük, Köşkerbaba, İmamoğlu and Değirmentepe. There are also some items which are found during the construction of Karakaya Dam. These are from neolithic, chalcolithic, bronze Age, Hittites, Urartu, Roman Empire, Byzantine Empire, Anatolian Seljuks, Anatolian Beyliks and the Ottoman Empire eras. Some of the more important items in the museum are the following:

- Neolithic sculptures (dated to B.C. 8000) from Caferhöyük excavations
- Early Bronze Age swords (dated to B.C. 3200–3800) from Arslantepe excavations
- Human tomb (dated to B.C. 4000) from Arslantepe excavations
