= Tünp Stele =

Hittite monument

The Tünp Stele is a Hittite monument in the museum in Gaziantep, Turkey. It was found in 1965 at Yazılı (then called Tünp) south of Gaziantep. The 90 cm high monument is inscribed with four lines of Luwian hieroglyphs. It records a contract of sale between two private landowners and probably dates to the middle of the 8th century BC.

== Bibliography ==
- John David Hawkins: Corpus of Hieroglyphic Luwian Inscriptions I: Inscriptions of the Iron Age 1. Text. Introduction, Karatepe, Karkamiš, Tell Ahmar, Maraş, Malatya, Commagene (= Studies in Indo-European Language and Culture 8), pp. 154–156. Walter de Gruyter, Berlin. 2000, ISBN 3-11-010864-X.
