= Maraş lion =

Late Hittite sculpture of a lion

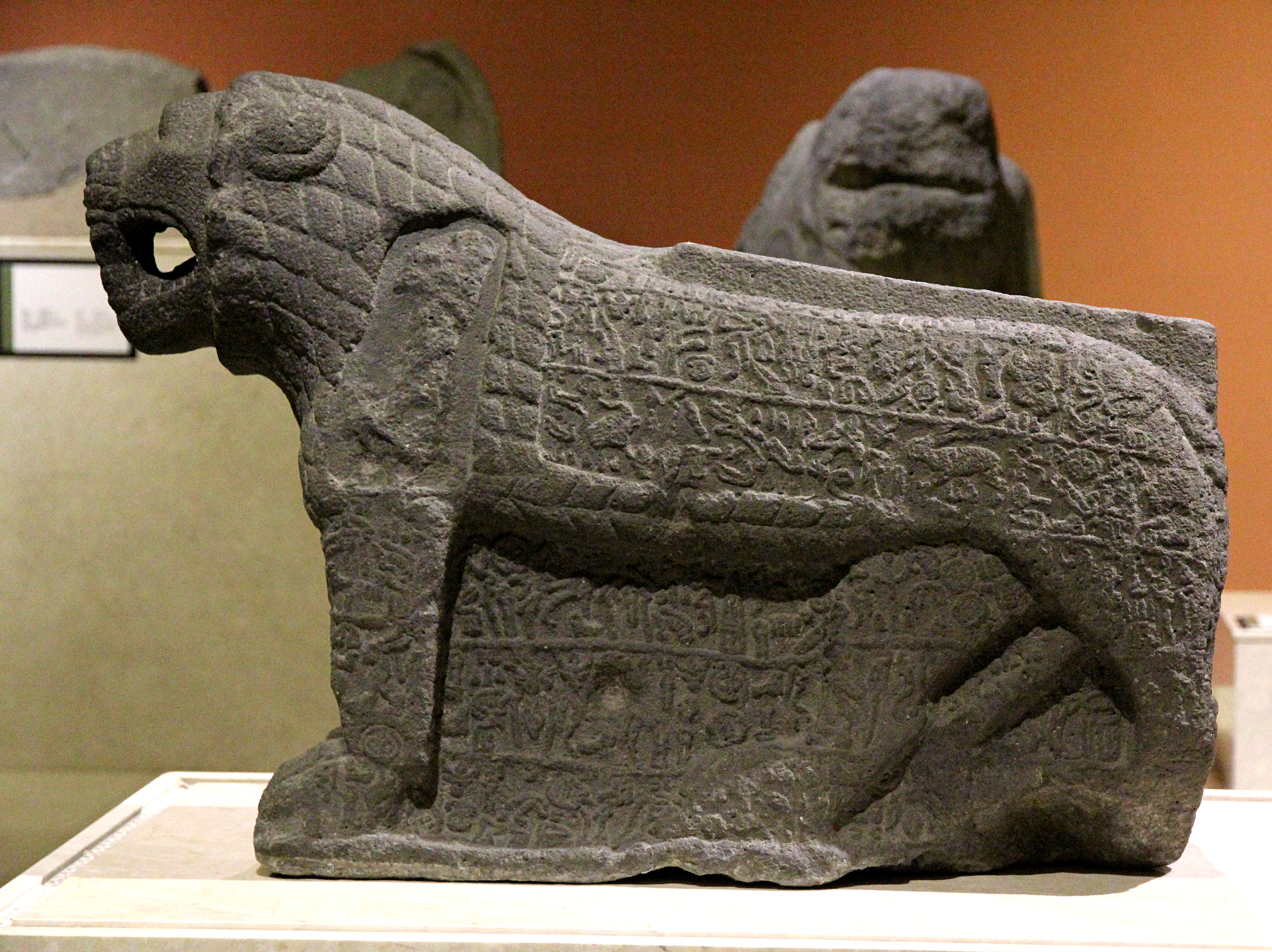
Portallöwe im Museum von Kahramanmaraş

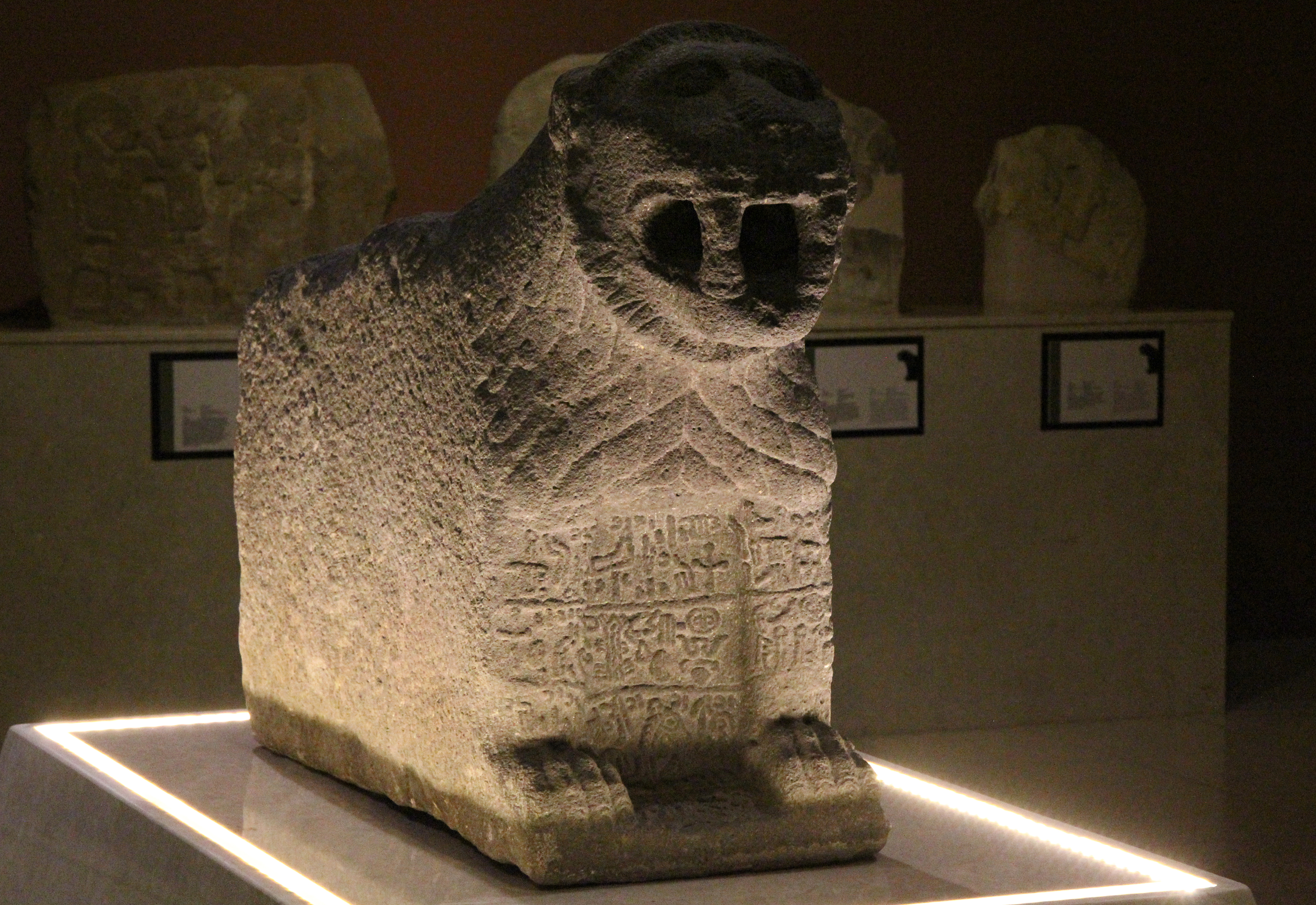
Front and right side

The Maraş lion is a Late Hittite sculpture of a lion with a hieroglyphic inscription. It was discovered on the citadel of Kahramanmaraş (formerly Maraş) in 1883 and is displayed in the Kahramanmaraş Archaeological Museum. John David Hawkins assigned it the name Maraş 1, while Winfried Orthmann used Maraş B/1. Massive sculptures of lions are a recurrent feature of Hittite art, especially in the Neo-Hittite period.

== Discovery ==
The lion statue was discovered in 1883 by Carl Humann and Otto Puchstein on their Anatolian travels in the castle of Marʿasch (modern Kahramanmaraş). A second, uninscribed lion which was slightly larger was left in situ by one of the fortress gates, while the inscribed lion was taken to the Archaeological Museum in Istanbul. A plaster cast was produced for the Berlin Museums. After many years, the lion was transferred to the Kahramanmaraş Archaeological Museum on 30 August 2013, at the initiative of the Ministry of Culture and Tourism (Kültür ve Turizm Bakanlığı). The sculpture has been analysed by numerous scholars, including Ekrem Akurgal, Helmuth Theodor Bossert, John David Hawkins and Winfried Orthmann.

== Description ==
The basalt sculpture is 0.41 metres high, 0.73 m long and 0.23 m wide. It is in very good condition. The head and the front legs are fully carved in the round; the left side is carved in high relief upon the inscribed plaque between the feet and the body. The right side, backside, left hindquarters and the tail are unworked, probably because they were not visible in the statue's original location by a door or next to another statue. This flat surface continues in a platform on the lion's back. Hawkins therefore suggested that the line was the pedestal for a statue.

The round head shows Assyrian influence. Eyes, nose and ears are clearly recognisable. The open mouth is lined with a row of teeth; the largest fangs collide with each other. The stylised mane stretches to its shoulders and halfway down his front legs. Chest hair is also visible in diamond-shaped tufts. Claws and toes are clearly worked on the front paws and are also visible on the back legs.

Above the left front leg, in the mane, there is a flat recessed area with a badly damaged figure of a man standing on an animal (probably a lion). This might be the author of the inscribed text. Hawkins understands it as the text's introductory amu-figure - amu being the Luwian hieroglyphic EGO-symbol ("I"). A six line hieroglyphic inscription begins to the right of this figure, which runs all the way to the lion's tail and continues in a Boustrophedon style over the entire body of the lion and the flat space between its legs. The text breaks off between the front legs at the beginning of a seventh line; it is assumed that the text continued on another surface, either on a statue standing on the lion's back or on a second lion.

In the inscription, the author is named as Halparuntiyas, King of Gurgum, son of Laramas, grandson of Halparuntiyas, great-grandson of Muwatalli.... He declares his loyalty to the gods, especially Tarhunzas and Runtija, as well as his veneration of his ancestors, and then he describes his deeds. From the list of ancestors it is possible to identify the ruler as Halparuntiyas III, king of the Neo-Hittite kingdom of Gurgum, whose capital lay on the location of modern Kahramanmaraş. The depiction of the ruler standing atop a lion probably indicates his posthumous divinisation, suggesting that the statue was made in or after the reign of Halparuntiyas III, at the end of the 9th century BC.

== Bibliography ==
- Winfried Orthmann. Untersuchungen zur späthethitischen Kunst. (= Saarbrücker Beiträge zur Altertumskunde Vol. 8) Habelt, Bonn 1971, ISBN 978-3774911222, pp. 89, 139, 143, 205, 288, 290, 291, 360, 524.
- John David Hawkins. Corpus of Hieroglyphic Luwian Inscriptions. Vol. I: Inscriptions of the Iron Age. Part 2: Text. Amuq, Aleppo, Hama, Tabal, Assur Letters, Miscellaneous, Seals, Indices. (= Studies in Indo-European Language and Culture 8). de Gruyter, Berlin. 2000, ISBN 3-11-010864-X, pp. 261–265 No. IV.4 Tbl. 112–113.
