= Kahramanmaraş Archaeology Museum =

Museum in Turkey

- Kahramanmaraş Arkeoloji Müzesi
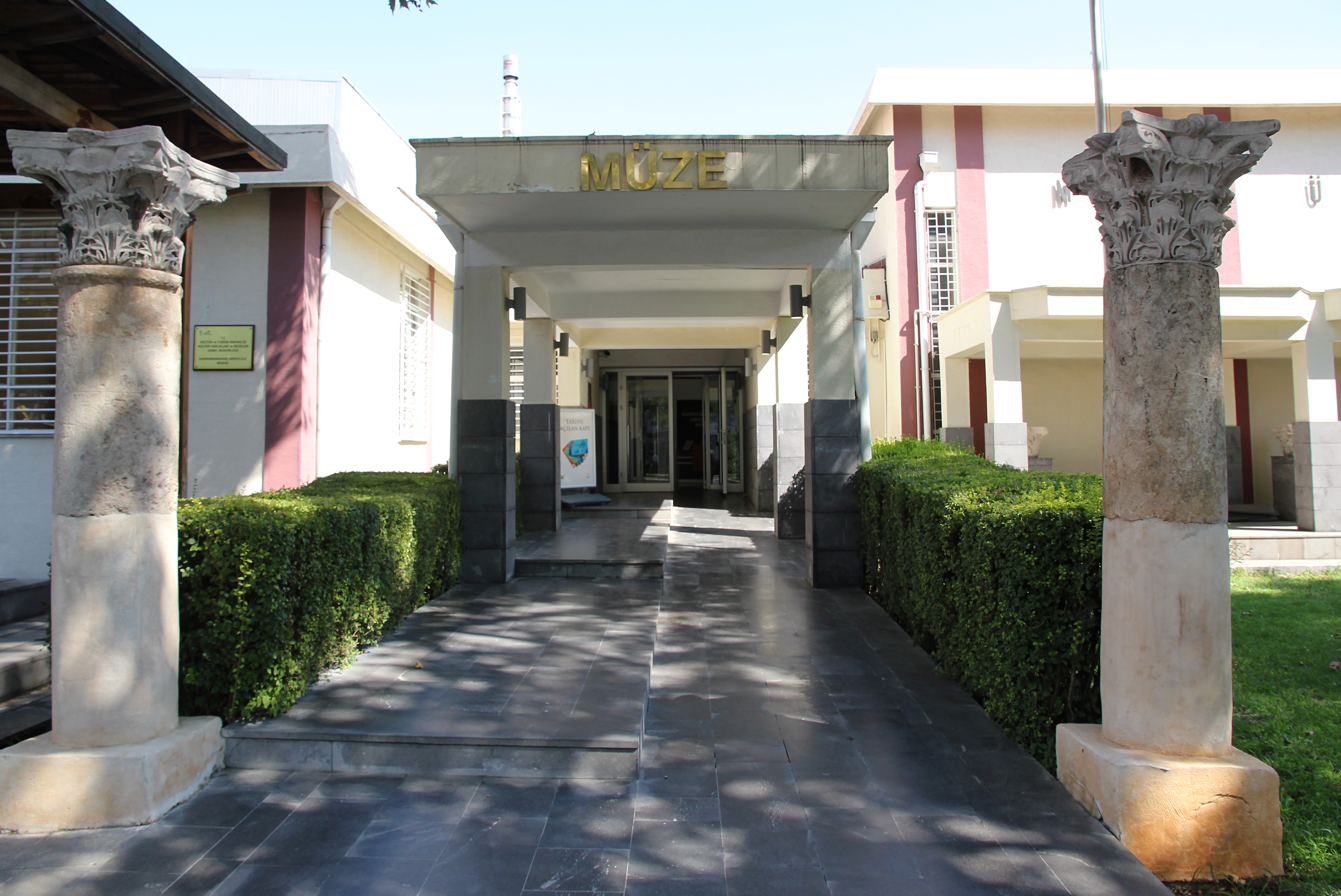
- Museum entrance

- Kahramanmaraş Archaeology Museum
- Established: 1947; 79 years ago
- Coordinates: 37°34′26″N 36°55′34″E
- Type: Archaeology
- Owner: Ministry of Culture

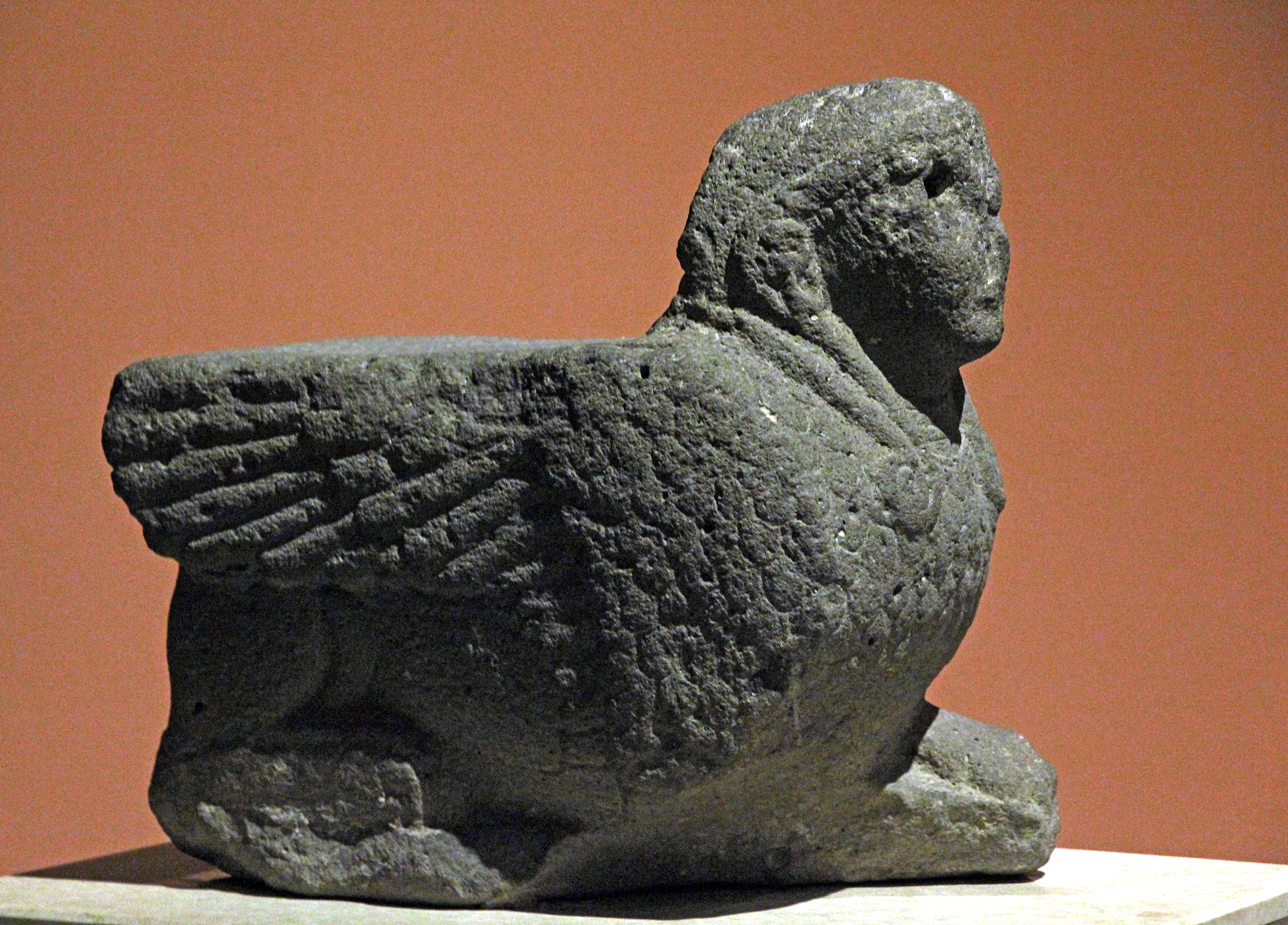
Sphinx

Kahramanmaraş Archaeology Museum is a museum in Kahramanmaraş, Turkey. The museum is on Azerbeycan Boulevard in Kahramanmaraş. Its geographic coordinates are 37°34′26″N 36°55′34″E.

== History ==
According to the Ministry of Culture and Tourism, even in the Medieval Age during the Dulkadir Beylik there was a primitive museum of steles in the Kahramanmaraş Castle The museum was established during the Republican Age in 1947. In 1961 the museum was transferred to the castle and in 1975 to its present building. The museum was closed for renovations from 2008 until 2012, during which time an annex was added. This increased the number of exhibition halls from three to seven and nearly tripled the exhibition space to 1,586 square metres. The museum was damaged in the 2023 Turkey–Syria earthquakes and was subsequently closed for restoration work. It reopened in February 2025.

== Exhibited items ==
The items in the museum are from paleolithic, neolithic, chalcolithic, Bronze, Iron, Hellenistic, Roman, Byzantine Ages. The items are exhibited in seven specialized halls; a skeleton of an Anatolian elephant (now extinct from Anatolia), Direkli excavations, Domuztepe excavations, Hittite items, mosaics, stone tools, chronological archaeology. The museums collection consists of over 30,000 items.
