= Ignace Gelb =

Polish-American Assyriologist (1907–1985)

- Born: October 14, 1907; Tarnau, Galicia and Lodomeria, Austria-Hungary
- Died: December 22, 1985 (aged 78); Chicago, Illinois, U.S.
- Occupations: Ancient historian; Assyriologist
- Known for: Study of writing systems; Grammatology

Academic background
- Education: Sapienza University of Rome

Academic work
- Notable works: A Study of Writing (1952)

Ignace Jay Gelb (October 14, 1907 – December 22, 1985) was a Polish-American Assyriologist who pioneered the scientific study of writing systems.

== Early life ==
Born in Tarnów, Austro-Hungarian Empire (now Poland), he earned his PhD from the University of Rome in 1929, then went to the University of Chicago where he was a professor of Assyriology until his death.

== Career ==
Although writing systems have been studied for centuries by linguists, Gelb is widely regarded as the first scientific practitioner of the study of scripts, and coined the term grammatology to refer to the study of writing systems. In A Study of Writing (1952), he suggested that scripts evolve in a single direction, from logographic scripts to syllabaries to alphabets. This historical typology has been criticized as overly simplistic, forcing the data to fit the model and ignoring exceptional cases. Gelb's typology has since been refined by Peter T. Daniels and others.

Gelb had contributed significantly to the decipherment of the Anatolian hieroglyphs (formerly often referred to as 'Hittite hieroglyphs'), having published 3 volumes of studies on the subject.

In the course of his career, he published over 20 books, that have been translated into many languages, and over 250 scientific articles.

=== View of the Maya ===
Gelb believed that the Maya hieroglyphs did not qualify as true writing capable of representing language, which has now been disproven following the decipherment of the Maya script.

=== Work in Assyriology ===
Gelb's work in Assyriology focused on publishing editions of Akkadian texts and a grammar and dictionary of Old Akkadian. He became editor of the Chicago Assyrian Dictionary in 1947 and continued work on the project until his death. His other important works include works on Mesopotamian land tenure and sales, metrology, and other aspects of economic and social history.

Gelb, supported by Assyriologist Aage Westenholz, differentiated three stages of Old Akkadian: that of the pre-Sargonic era, that of the Akkadian empire, and that of the Ur III period.

He was a fellow of the American Academy of Arts and Sciences (1968) and of the British Academy (1978), a member of the Accademia Nazionale dei Lincei, and in 1975 he was elected as a member of the prestigious American Philosophical Society. Additionally, from 1965 to 1966 he was president of the American Oriental Society.
