= Nick Fisher =

Nick or Nicholas Fisher may refer to:

- Nick Fisher (skier) (born 1981), Australian freestyle skier
- Nick Fisher (broadcaster) (1959–2022), British screenwriter, journalist and TV fisherman
- Nick Fisher (historian), British historian of ancient Greece
- Nick Fisher, travel documentary producer responsible for Indigo Traveller
- Nicholas Fisher (statistician), Australian statistician
