= Tyrtaeus =

Ancient Greek elegiac poet from Sparta

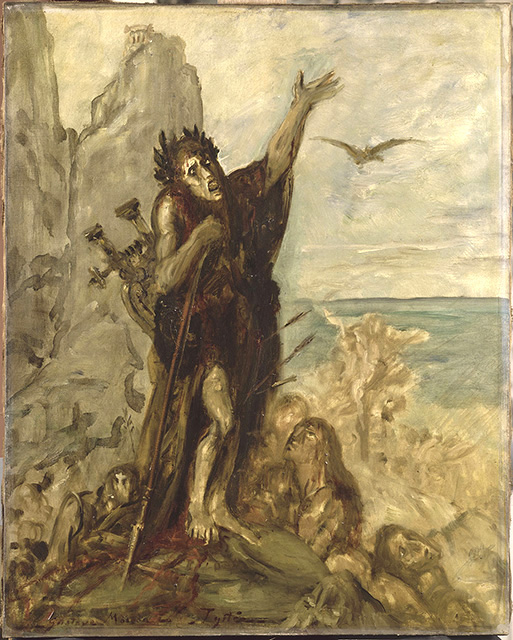
Tyrtée by Gustave Moreau, 1882

Tyrtaeus (/tɜːrˈtiːəs/; Ancient Greek: Τυρταῖος Tyrtaios; fl. mid-7th century BC) was a Greek elegiac poet from Sparta whose works were speculated to fill five books. His works survive from quotations and papyri, and include 250 lines or parts of lines. He wrote at a time of two crises affecting the city: a civic unrest threatening the authority of kings and elders, later recalled in a poem named Eunomia ("Law and Order"), where he reminded citizens to respect the divine and constitutional roles of kings, council, and demos; and the Second Messenian War, during which he served as a sort of "state poet", exhorting Spartans to fight to the death for their city. In the 4th century BC, when Tyrtaeus was an established classic, Spartan armies on campaign were made to listen to his poetry. The Suda states that he wrote martial songs; these were important in Spartan festivals and were done through anapaestic and iambic chants that accompanied armed dances and processions.

== Life ==
=== Birth and place of origin ===
The floruit given in the first entry of Suda is perhaps too early since Jerome offers a date of 633–632 BC. Modern scholars are less specific and provide instead date ranges for the Second Messenian War (and thus for Tyrtaeus' life) such as "the latter part of the 7th century", or "any time between the sixties and the thirties" of the 7th century.

The confusion about his place of origin, which emerged by the 5th century BC, may have had several causes. It has been suggested that the depictions of Tyrtaeus as a lame schoolmaster from Athens were invented to denigrate Sparta, which in the views of Athenians could not have had a talented poet of its own. According to Pausanias, the Athenians sent the lame, mentally defective teacher-poet to Sparta as a compromise, wishing to obey the oracle which had demanded an Athenian, but unwilling to help the Spartans in their war with a more capable individual. Yet, Tyrtaeus was not listed by Herodotus among the two foreigners ever to have been awarded Spartan citizenship. One ancient source even listed Aphidnae as his supposed Athenian deme, but there was also a place of that name in Laconia.

Ancient Athenian propaganda might indeed have played a role, although even Plato, who could hardly have intended any denigration as an admirer of Sparta, gave credence to the poet's Athenian origin. According to scholar N. R. E. Fisher, "[t]he story was surely an invention by Athenians, designed in the first instance for a predominantly Athenian market. It must have been aimed at making co-operation between Sparta and Athens more acceptable". It has also been noted that Tyrtaeus did not compose in the vernacular Laconian Doric dialect of Sparta, as could be expected of a native Spartan like his near contemporary Alcman. However, Greek elegists used the Ionic dialect of Homer regardless of their city of origin or their audience.

Scholars generally agree that Tyrtaeus was a native of Laconia for several reasons: the use of the first personal plural to include himself among the Heraclidae whom Zeus had given to Sparta in fragment 2; the presence of occasional Doric words in his vocabulary; and his tone of authority when addressing Spartan warriors, which would have been tolerated only if delivered by a Spartan-born poet.

=== Sources ===
Virtually all that is known about the life of Tyrtaeus is found in two entries of the Suda, a Byzantine encyclopedia redacted in the 10th century AD.

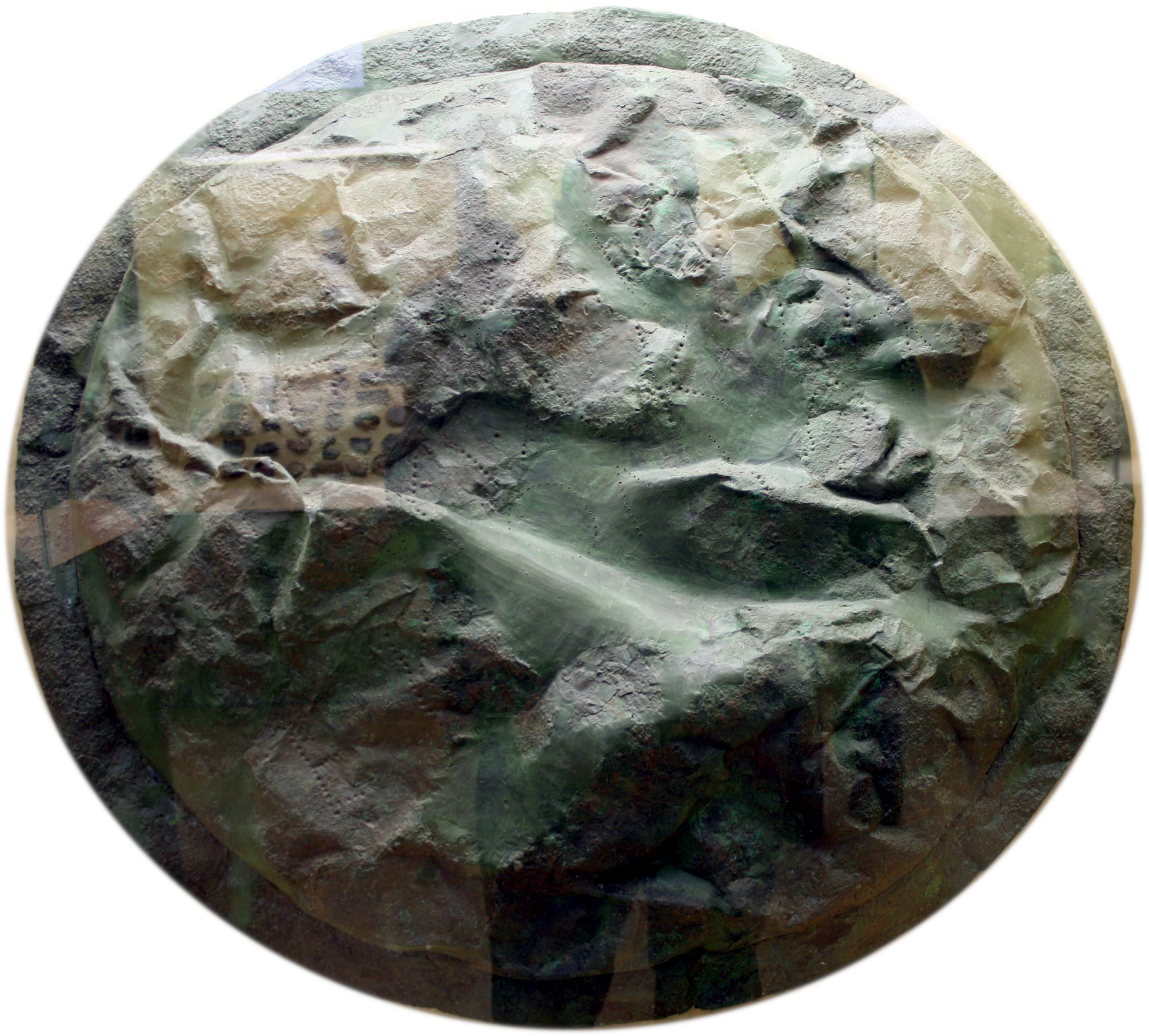
Bronze Spartan shield captured by Athenian soldiers at the Battle of Pylos in 425 BCE and now stored in the Ancient Agora Museum

The first of the entry of the Suda runs as follows:

Tyrtaeus, son of Archembrotus, a Laconian or Milesian elegiac poet and pipe-player. It is said that by means of his songs he urged on the Lacedaemonians in their war with the Messenians and in this way enabled them to get the upper hand. He is very ancient, contemporary with those called the Seven sages, or even earlier. He flourished in the 35th Olympiad (640–637 BC). He wrote a constitution for the Lacedaemonians, precepts in elegiac verse, and war songs, in five books.

The second entry states that the Spartans took him as their general from among the Athenians in response to an oracle.

Tyrtaeus. The Lacedaemonians swore that they would either capture Messene or die, and when the god gave them an oracle to take a general from the Athenians, they took the poet Tyrtaeus, a man who was lame. By exhorting them to valour he captured Messene in the 20th year. They razed it and grouped the prisoners among the helots.

Traditional accounts of his life were almost entirely deduced from his poetry or were simply fiction, such as the account by Pausanias (2nd century AD) of his supposed transformation from a lame and stupid school teacher in Athens to the mastermind of Spartan victories against the Messenians. Variations on his Athenian origin and deformity are found in numerous ancient sources. This includes philosopher Diogenes Laërtius (3rd century AD), who said that the Athenians regarded him as deranged, and Porphyry (3rd century AD), who labelled him "one-eyed." Finally, historian Justin (2nd century AD) believed that he was sent to the Spartans by the Athenians as a deliberate insult.

During the 19th and early 20th centuries, the picture of Tyrtaeus' life has been complicated by doubts about the authenticity of many of his verses, which were dated by various scholars to the 5th or 4th century BC. The theory that Tyrtaeus was in fact a 5th-century Athenian poet was even posited by Eduard Schwartz in 1899. According to Douglas E. Gerber (1997), however, "that skepticism has now largely disappeared". Disagreements among scholars now essentially revolve around the version of fragment 4 that should be accepted as genuine (Plutarch's or Diodorus' version, or a combination of the two), and some doubts remain about the dating of fragment 12, which some critics have assigned to the time of Xenophanes (c. 570 – c. 475 BC) or shortly before 498 BC.

=== Sparta at the time of Tyrtaeus ===
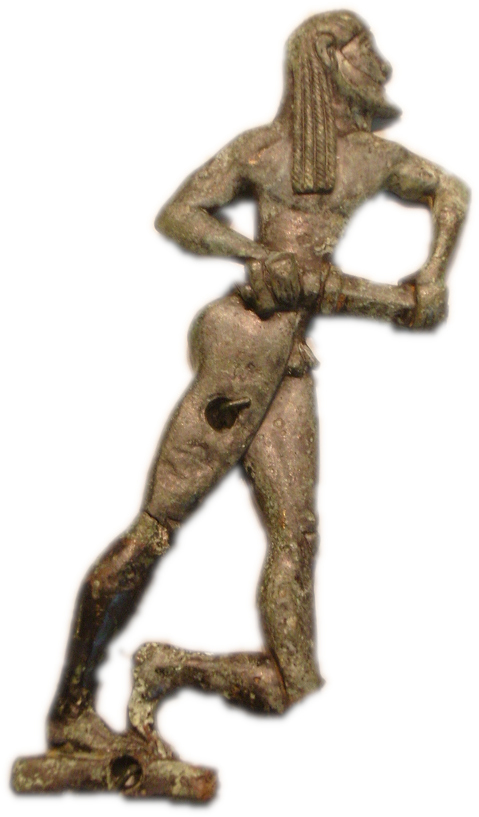
Spartan swordsman in bronze, appliqué. Originally part of a relief decorating a piece of furniture, 550–25 BCE.

The conquest of Messenia in the 8th century BC, by the grandfathers of Tyrtaeus's generation, provided the foundation for a sophisticated and cultivated lifestyle. Foreign poets like the Lesbian Terpander and Cretan Thaletas were welcome guests. Ivory and gold ornaments, bronze vessels of ornate workmanship, fine pottery and the odes of Alcman all testify to refined tastes, continuing even into the sixth century. The continuance of those luxuries was "dearly purchased" in blood and toil by Tyrtaeus's generation when the Messenians revolted, and the ensuing war and civil strife inspired his entire poetic work. The crisis was mentioned by Aristotle for its instructive power:

Moreover, factions arise whenever some (aristocrats) are extremely poor and others are well off. And this happens especially during wars; it happened too in Sparta in the course of the Messenian War, as is clear from the poem of Tyrtaeus called Eunomia. For some, hard pressed because of the war, demanded a redistribution of the land.

His verses seem to mark a critical point in Spartan history, when Spartans began to turn from their flourishing arts and crafts and from the lighter verses of poets like Alcman (roughly his contemporary), to embrace a regime of military austerity: "life in Sparta became spartan". Some modern scholars believe that Tyrtaeus helped to precipitate and formulate this transition, but others see no real evidence for this.

Tyrtaeus in his poetry urged the Spartans to remain loyal to the state and he reminded them of a constitution based on divine providence, requiring co-operation of kings, elders and the people. (Note: "After listening to Phoebus, they brought home from Pytho the god's oracles and sure predictions. The divinely honoured kings, in whose care is Sparta's lovely city, and the aged elders are to initiate counsel; and the men of the people, responding with straight utterances, are to speak fair words, act justly in everything, and not give the city (crooked?) counsel. Victory and power are to accompany the mass of the people. For so was Phoebus' revelation about this to the city."—adapted into prose from Plutarch, Life of Lycurgus 6, and Diodorus Siculus World History 7.12.5–6, by Gerber (1999), p. 41.) He sought to inspire them in battle by celebrating the example of their grandfathers' generation, when Messenia was first captured, in the rule of King Theopompus, (Note: "...our king Theopompus dear to the gods, through whom we captured spacious Messene, Messene good to plough and good to plant. For nineteen years the spearmen fathers of our fathers fought unceasingly over it, displaying steadfast courage in their hearts, and in the twentieth year the enemy fled from the high mountain range of Ithome, abandoning their rich farmlands."—adapted into prose from three sources (Pausanias 4.6.5, schol. ad loc. (p. 301 Greene) on Plato's Laws, Strabo 6.3.3) by Gerber (1999), p. 45.) and he gave practical advice on weapons, armour and tactics (see for example the verses below). Some modern scholars however think his advice shows more familiarity with the schoolroom than with the battlefield, appearing to feature obsolete armour and tactics typical of Homeric rather than hoplite warfare. Others have argued that the Spartans at that time were still developing hoplite tactics, or that they were adapting hoplite tactics to encounter Messenian guerillas.

His poems are the martial hymn-book of that discipline and devotion to the state which held Spartan ranks steady in the face of certain death at Thermopylae and became one of the enduring legends of western history.

— J. P. Barron and P. E. Easterling

Tyrtaeus's poetry is almost always interpreted teleologically, for signs of its subsequent impact on Spartan society. The similarities in meter and phrasing between Homeric epic and early elegy have encouraged this tendency, sometimes leading to dramatic conclusions about Tyrtaeus's significance. He has been called, for example, "the first poet of the Greek city state" and, in a similar vein, "he has recast the Homeric ideal of the single champion's arete (excellence) into the arete of the patriot". For some scholars, this is to credit Tyrtaeus with too much: his use of arete was not an advance on Homer's use of it but can still be interpreted as signifying "virtue" in the archaic sense of an individual's power to achieve something rather than as an anticipation of the classical sense of moral excellence, familiar to Plato and others.

Athenaeus, Strabo and the second entry of the Suda claim that Tyrtaeus was a Spartan general. Some modern scholars, such as F. Rossi (1967–68), maintain that Tyrtaeus held a high military position, but Gerber (1997) contends that this is a speculative surmise: "[i]t may have been assumed that only a military commander could give military admonitions and instructions, but it is an unnecessary assumption."

== Works ==
The Constitution (Πολιτεία λακεδαιμονίοις) mentioned by the Suda is generally treated as an alternative title for the Eunomia (Εὐνομία) mentioned by Aristotle and Strabo. Surviving only in a few fragments, it seems to have emphasized the role of divine providence in the development of the state and of its government. Eventually the Spartans emerged from the Second Messenian War with their constitution intact, either because victory made change unnecessary or because "religious propaganda" of the kind promoted by Tyrtaeus stemmed the pressure for change.

According to the Suda, both his Constitution and his Precepts (Ὑποθῆκαι) were composed in elegiac couplets. Pausanias also mentions Anapests, a few lines of which are quoted by Dio Chrysostom and attributed to Tyrtaeus by a scholiast. They are generally seen by scholars as belonging to the so-called War Songs (Μέλη Πολεμιστήρια) mentioned by the Suda. Presumably written in the Laconian dialect, nothing else of it has survived.

According to Philodemus, who presented it as a little-known fact, Tyrtaeus was honoured above others because of his music, not just his verses. Pollux stated that Tyrtaeus introduced Spartans to three choruses based on age (boys, young and old men), and some modern scholars in fact contend that he composed his elegies in units of five couplets each, alternating between exhortation and reflection, in a kind of responsion similar to Greek choral poetry. Ancient commentators included Tyrtaeus with Archilochus and Callinus as the possible inventor of the elegy.

== Poetry ==
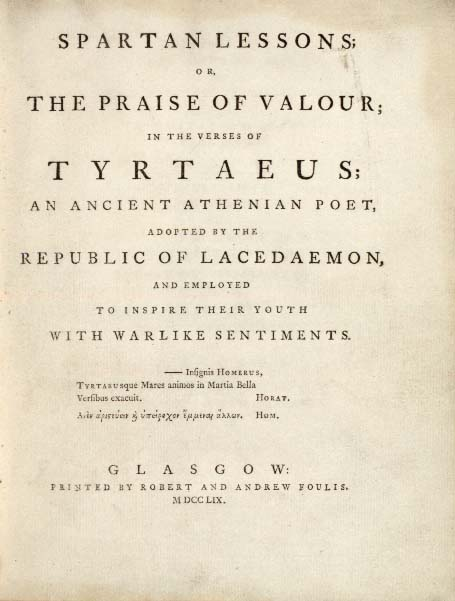
Tyrtaeus, Spartan Lessons; Glasgow: Robert and Andrew Foulis, 1759 (title page)

Tyrtaeus was predominantly an elegiac poet. Elegy may be described as "a variation upon the heroic hexameter, in the direction of lyric poetry". Heroic hexameters were used by Homer, whose phrases and Ionian vocabulary became the mainstay of Tyrtaeus's verse, even though that was composed for Doric-speaking Spartan audiences—"...a measure of the extent to which the Ionian epics had by now created among the Greeks a cultural unity which transcended dialect and ethnic rivalry". The use of Ionian vocabulary is all the more remarkable in that Tyrtaeus gave voice to a national, military ethic peculiar to Sparta, and his verses were possibly sung at banquets on campaign and even on the march. (Note: "...the Spartans themselves in their wars march in time to the poems of Tyrtaeus which they recite from memory...after the Lacedaemonians prevailed over the Messenians because of the generalship of Tyrtaeus, they established the custom in their campaigns that, after dinner and the hymn of thanksgiving, each sing in turn the poems of Tyrtaeus; their military commander acts as judge and gives a prize of meat to the winner".—Athenaeus, Scholars at Dinner 14.630f, translated by Douglas E. Gerber, Greek Elegiac Poetry, Loeb Classical Library (1999), pages 33–4) However, the only verse surviving from the marching songs (Ἐμβατήρια) is in anapests, it includes Dorisms and its authenticity is doubtful. (Note: "Genuine sons of Sparta bold! Firm and full your bucklers hold: With intrepid step advance: Poise and point the vengeful lance. Life despise and dare to fall: Glory and your country call!" Translated into heroic trochees/iambs by Gilbert Wakefield, B.A., Select Essays of Dio Chrysostom, London (1800).)

The elegies, being sung at military banquets, belong to a tradition of sympotic poetry while also being representative of the genre of martial exhortation. The adoption of language and thematic concerns from Homeric epic is characteristic of this genre. For instance, the words of Tyrtaeus 10.1–2 ("For it is a fine thing for a man having fallen nobly amid the fore-fighters to die, fighting on behalf of the fatherland") undoubtedly echo Hector's speech in 15.494–7 of Homer's Iliad.: ("And whoever hit by a missile or struck by a sword find his death and fated end, let him die. It is not unseemly for one to die protecting the land of his fathers"). It is possible that Tyrtaeus intentionally alludes to Homer in instances such as these for political reasons: given the fact that his poetry, like that of other archaic authors, was most likely performed in the context of aristocratic symposia, his references to epic heroism served to praise the elite status of his aristocratic audience.

=== Poetic style ===
The three longest fragments of surviving verse (fr. 10–12) are complete or virtually complete poems describing the ideal warrior and the disgrace or glory that attends his personal choices. Their poetic quality is uneven, they include some arresting imagery and there are some clumsy transitions, repetitions and padding. The following lines belong to one of these (fr. 11, lines 27–34, here referred to as lines 1–8) and they give a compelling picture of battle between hoplite forces.

ἔρδων δ' ὄβριμα ἔργα διδασκέσθω πολεμίζειν,
μηδ' ἐκτὸς βελέων ἑστάτω ἀσπίδ' ἔχων,
ἀλλά τις ἐγγὺς ἰὼν αὐτοσχεδὸν ἔγχει μακρῷ
ἢ ξίφει οὐτάζων δήιον ἄνδρ' ἑλέτω,
καὶ πόδα πὰρ ποδὶ θεὶς καὶ ἐπ' ἀσπίδος ἀσπίδ' ἐρείσας,
ἐν δὲ λόφον τε λόφῳ καὶ κυνέην κυνέῃ
καὶ στέρνον στέρνῳ πεπλημένος ἀνδρὶ μαχέσθω,
ἢ ξίφεος κώπην ἢ δόρυ μακρὸν ἑλών.

Translation:

Let a man learn how to fight by first daring to perform mighty deeds,
Not where the missiles won't reach, if he is armed with a shield,
But getting in close where fighting is hand to hand, inflicting a wound
With his long spear or his sword, taking the enemy's life,
With his foot planted alongside a foot and his shield pressed against shield,
And his crest up against crest and his helm up against helm
And breast against breast, embroiled in the action—let him fight man to man,
Holding secure in his grasp haft of his sword or his spear!

The noble sentiment of line 1 seems to be original yet the vocabulary is entirely Homeric and, though lines 5–7 are adapted from Homer's Iliad (13.130–33), (Note: "...locking spear by spear, shield against shield at the base, so buckler/ leaned on buckler, helmet on helmet, man against man, and the horse-hair crests along the horns of their shining helmets/ touched as they bent their heads, so dense were they formed on each other,..."— Iliad 13.130–33, translated by R.Lattimore, The Iliad of Homer, University of Chicago Press (1951)) there is an important difference: Homer describes the advance of one side in close formation, whereas Tyrtaeus describes two sides meeting in the hoplite style of fighting. The description of the battle is rejected however by some scholars as anachronistic: for example, missiles were not characteristic of hoplite warfare. The passage demonstrates one of the more common devices employed by Tyrtaeus—the use of parallel phrases for amplification, sometimes degenerating into tedious repetition. Here it is used to communicate a sense of the crowded battlefield.

=== Military ideology ===
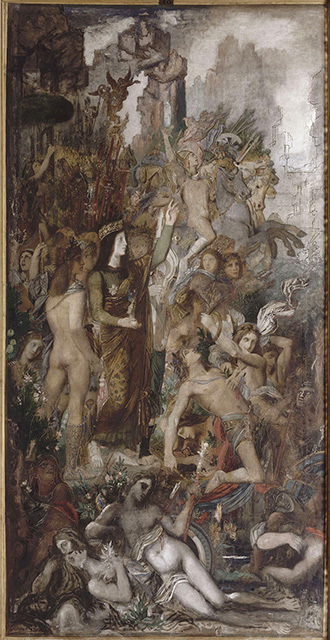
Tyrtée chantant pendant le combat (Tyrtaeus singing during the fight) by Gustave Moreau, 1860

In one of his poems, Tyrtaeus addresses the question of arete ('excellence' or 'virtue'), advancing the idea that patriotic military valor is the highest form of arete. Furthermore, he expresses the view that true arete can only be achieved as part of a group of comrades and emphasizes collective, not personal, victory. Tyrtaeus never mentions the names of individual warriors in this poem. Unlike Homeric works, Tyrtaeus' poetry does not aim to glorify the deeds of individual heroes.

== Legacy ==
According to Werner Jaeger, the influence of Tyrtaeus can be seen in the works of Xenophanes, Solon, and Theognis. The 5th- and 4th-century Athenian orators Gorgias, Lysias, Isocrates, Hypereides, and Lycurgus all appreciated Tyrtaeus. Plato quotes Tyrtaeus's elegy on arete in his dialogue Laws and mentions him alongside Homer in his condemnation of poetry as a whole, which has been interpreted as a compliment. Judging by references to Tyrtaeus by Horace and Quintilian, H. James Shey suggests that Tyrtaeus had "considerable influence in Rome".

Tyrtaeus played an important role in the creation of the "legend of Sparta" which served as a source of inspiration in Europe in later centuries. During the Renaissance, Tyrtaeus came to be seen as the "prototype of the artist using his talent to urge his countrymen to fight for freedom." According to Elizabeth Rawson, this is because of a story told by Plutarch in his Life of Cleomenes (2.3) in which the Spartan king Leonidas praises Tyrtaeus as "good at sharpening the courage of the young." Thus, Tyrtaeus was connected with the famous Spartan defense against the Persian invaders at Thermopylae, despite the fact that Tyrtaeus' poetry encouraged the Spartans in a war of aggression.

An inscription featuring one of Tyrtaeus' poems is located in the central square of Sparta. It is engraved on the pedestal of a bronze statue erected in 2006, depicting a hoplite soldier with one knee on the ground, holding a shield and a sword. The poem featured is a translation of the original into modern Greek.

== Editions and translations ==
There are English verse translations by Richard Polwhele (1792). In addition, there is also imitations by the English poet laureate H. J. Pye (1795). Finally, there is also an Italian version by F. Cavallotti, with text, introduction and notes (1898). The fragment that begins with Τεθνάμεναι γὰρ καλόν (fr. 10 West) has been translated by the poet Thomas Campbell. The edition by C. A. Klotz (1827) contains a dissertation on the war-songs of different countries.
