= Philomen Probert =

English philologist (born 1950)

Philomen Probert FBA
- Born: 1973 (age 52–53)
- Title: Professor of Classical Philology and Linguistics

Academic background
- Education: Exeter College, Oxford; St John's College, Oxford
- Thesis: Studies in ancient Greek accentuation (2000)
- Doctoral advisor: Anna Morpurgo Davies

Academic work
- Discipline: Classics; Linguistics
- Institutions: Faculty of Classics, University of Oxford; Wolfson College, Oxford

Philomen Probert FBA (born 1973) is a British classicist and academic, specialising in linguistics. She is Professor of Classical Philology and Linguistics at the University of Oxford.

== Early life and education ==
Probert was born in 1973 in London, England. From 1991 to 1995, she studied Literae Humaniores (i.e. classics) at Exeter College, Oxford, graduating with a Bachelor of Arts (BA) degree. Remaining at Exeter College, she undertook postgraduate studies in general linguistics and comparative philology, completing her Master of Philosophy (MPhil) degree in 1997. She then moved to St John's College, Oxford, where she undertook research towards her Doctor of Philosophy (DPhil) degree under the supervision of Anna Morpurgo Davies. She completed her DPhil in 2000 with a thesis titled "Studies in ancient Greek accentuation". Her doctoral thesis won the 2002 Conington Prize from the Faculty of Classics.

== Academic career ==
In 1999, Probert was appointed lecturer in Classical Philology and Linguistics at the University of Oxford and elected a Fellow of Wolfson College, Oxford. In the 2006/2007 academic year, she researched relative clauses in Greek on fellowship at the Center of Hellenic Studies at Harvard University. In 2011 she received a British Academy Mid-Career Fellowship to continue this research. In September 2016, she was awarded a Title of Distinction as Professor of Classical Philology and Linguistics. She was the Acting President of Wolfson College between October 2017 and April 2018. In 2024, she was elected as a Fellow of the British Academy.

Her research is focused on Ancient Greek, Latin, Anatolian and Indo-European linguistics, and the Graeco-Roman grammatical tradition.

== Personal life ==
Probert entered a civil partnership with Eleanor Dickey in 2008, and they have since been married.

== Selected works ==
- Probert, Philomen (2003). A new short guide to the accentuation of Ancient Greek. Bristol: Bristol Classical. ISBN 978-1853995996.
- Probert, Philomen (2006). Ancient Greek accentuation synchronic patterns, frequency effects, and prehistory. Oxford: Oxford University Press. ISBN 978-0199279609.
- Probert, Philomen; Willi, Andreas, eds. (2012). Laws and rules in Indo-European. Oxford: Oxford University Press. ISBN 978-0199609925.
- Probert, Philomen (2015). Early Greek Relative Clauses. Oxford: Oxford University Press. ISBN 978-0198713821.

Academic offices
Preceded by Hermione Lee	(Acting) President of Wolfson College, Oxford; 2017–2018	Succeeded by Tim Hitchens
