= Proto-Indo-European sḱé-present =

Proto-Indo-European verbal formation

The Proto-Indo-European sḱé-present is reconstructed on the basis of a variety of reflexes in numerous daughter languages, many of which showcase divergent semantic developments, complicating the identification of the original function of the formation. Nevertheless, it is usually ascribed an iterative, durative, or inchoative value.

== Structure ==
That there was an original palatovelar *ḱ in the suffix is perhaps supported by the Anatolian evidence. According to the linguist Craig Melchert, the Luwian suffix -za- may have emerged due to the simplification of earlier *-sza-, itself the regular reflex of Proto-Indo-European *-sḱé-. Moreover, if the existence of a palatovelar is accepted, then Lycian -s- is also adducible as a cognate, as -s- is the expected Lycian reflex of Proto-Indo-European *ḱ. Regarding the components of the suffix, the linguist Norbert Oettinger has suggested that it may comprise the elements *-s- and *ḱe ('now, here'). According to Oettinger, the particle *ḱe was added to the imperative forms of verbs (i.e. 2s.impv. *ǵn̥h₃s-ḱé perhaps was reanalyzed as *ǵn̥h₃-sḱé). Similarly, Jasanoff has proposed that the *sḱé-suffix consisted of a morpheme *-s- and a thematic suffix *-ḱe. According to Jasanoff, the first component is perhaps connected to the desiderative suffix *-(h₁)se-, in which case the suffix was itself was once possibly of the shape *-(h₁)sḱ-. However, this proposal would require the deletion of the laryngeal following both sonorants and obstruents, whereas the thematic desiderative present appears to have only dropped the laryngeal prior to the latter consonant type. To remedy this issue, Jasanoff suggests that that the laryngeal was omitted due to a special sound law concerning clusters of the shape *-h₁sḱ-. or the analogy of obstruent-final roots. Another linguist, C. J. Ruijgh, proposes that the *-s- possibly served as a marker of telicity and the suffix at large functioned to derive imperfective telic terms from perfective telic verbs. Rujigh does, however, concede that this theory, though "tempting", is "difficult to prove". Alternatively, the linguist Andreas Willi has suggested that the first component of the suffix was merely a perfectivizing marker. However, Willi suggests that the addition of the second component, *-ḱe- probably served to reimperfectivize the overall term. Regarding the nature of this second element, Willi suggests that may equate to the k-extension present in terms such as Ancient Greek τήκω (tḗkō, 'to melt'), from *teh₂-k-, an enlargement of *teh₂- ('to melt').

== Ablaut ==
Sihler reconstructs the form as thematic, with zero-grade root and accent on the suffix. Such an ablaut paradigm is continued in Hittite, where the suffix—which remained productive—utilized the zero-grade of the root, as demonstrated by the form akkuške/a-, which derives from the verb ekuzi ~ akuanzi ('to drink'). Despite the usual zero-grade vocalism of *sḱé-presents, Sihler reconstructs at least one possible full-grade form: *ǵneh₃sḱéti, which is possibly the source of Latin nōscō and Ancient Greek γιγνώσκω (gignṓskō). However, the existence of the full-grade in this term is not universally accepted, with linguists such as Michiel de Vaan opting to reconstruct *ǵn̥h₃sḱéti. Tocharian B pāsk- and Latin pāscō perhaps also reflect a full-grade term of the shape *peh₂-sḱé-ti, though de Vaan likewise suggests possible zero-grade pre-form for the Latin term. Jasanoff argues that certain irregular full-grades emerged due to contamination with an s-present, noting the coexistence of *ǵ(e)nh₃sḱéti alongside the Hittite s-present ka-ni-eš-zi. Jasanoff further explains the irregular full-grade in Classical Armenian haycʻem ('to ask'), which he derives from *h₂isḱéti ('to be searching'), as the result of such influence from s-presents. Willi suggests that a pre-form of the shape *CéC-s-ḱe/o- once served as the imperfective counterpart to the sigmatic aorist, whereas a separate form *CC-sḱé/ó- later emerged as an imperfective counterpart to the root aorist. This new formation acquired the zero-grade in the root as a parallel to the zero-grade of the weak stem of the root aorist, just as the other *CéC-s-ḱe/o- formation paralleled the full grade of the weak steam of the sigmatic aorist.

== Semantics ==
=== Within PIE ===
According to Jasanoff, the original semantic function of the suffix was possibly desiderative, perhaps with an additional somewhat conative sense. Sihler suggests that it is possible the unify the disparate reflex of this PIE formation under a single originally iterative-durative suffix, as he argues that it is generally common for iteratives to evolve to denote past habitual action. Jasanoff proposes that the iterative sense perhaps secondarily emerged from an earlier desiderative purpose, with an original desiderative meaning of 'to be disposed to be or do something' shifting to describe habitual actions, which possibly allowed for a transition towards an iterative function. Moreover, Jasanoff suggests that the desiderative meaning would have been functionally identical to the sense 'to be in the initial stages of doing or becoming something', which would perhaps have allowed for the acquisition of inchoative semantics. The iterative use potentially emerged from the causative function, perhaps in the same manner as the causative-iterative suffix *-éyeti.

Willi, however, suggests that the suffix originally lacked any specific lexical aspect and instead merely possessed a generically imperfective value. According to Willi, iterativity is itself a necessary by-product of any imperfective formation, and that the inchoativity of descendants—such as Latin -ēscō—only emerged due to the influence of the stative morpheme *-éh₁-. Ultimately, Willi suggests that the suffix, in his earliest incarnation, formed imperfective verbs from root aorists, such as *gʷm̥sḱéti, which exists beside the root aorist *gʷémt. However, this suffix—and the corresponding zero-grade ablaut—eventually spread to other roots, thus explaining the existence of verbs such as φάσκω (pháskō) (< *bʰh₂-sḱéti), which exists beside a root present *bʰéh₂ti ('to speak, be talking'). In contrast to Willi, the linguists Guglielmo Inglese and Simone Mattiola have proposed that the suffix only acquired more general imperfective meanings as a consequence of secondary developments in the daughter languages, whereas the original suffix functioned largely as a marker of iterativity or pluractionality. Inglese and Mattiola argue that crosslinguistic studies on the semantic development of originally iterative formations reveal a general trend wherein iterativity shifts towards imperfectivity. They nevertheless concede that their proposed scenario is "speculative" and requires comparison with a more rigorous internal reconstruction of the semantics of this suffix and the PIE aspect system.

=== Across the daughter languages ===
The original meaning of the suffix has been partially obscured by the multivarious functions it acquired in the daughter languages: The Latin suffix -scō forms inchoative-intransitive verbs, whereas the Tocharian reflexes form causatives. Beside Tocharian, there are other examples of causative *sḱé-presents, such as Ancient Greek πιπίσκω (pipískō, 'to cause to drink'). In Ancient Greek, the -σκω (-skō) verbs are divisible into three major subgroups based upon their semantics. Aside from the aforementioned causative verbs, there were also certain inchoative terms, such as γηράσκω (gēráskō, 'to grow old'), and also verbs that showed no unique semantic characteristics and were indistinguishable from an ordinary present, such as ἀρέσκω (aréskō, 'to please'). The causative forms are often transitive and opposed to stative base verbs, such as μεθύσκω (methúskō; 'to intoxicate, make drunk'), which exists alongside the base verb μεθύω (methúō, 'to be drunk'). Likewise, the inchoative verbs also exist opposite to stative verbs, yet they are usually intransitive themselves, such as γενειάσκω (geneiáskō, 'to begin to grow a beard'), which exists parallel to γενειάω ('to have a beard').

Whereas the exact function of the suffix in Classical Greek is unclear, in Homeric and Ionic Greek, the suffix appears to have remained productively capable of forming words that described habitual activities, such as the term δόσκον (dóskon, 'was accustomed to give'), which belonged to the verb δίδωμι (dídōmi, 'to give'). This suffix could create new imperfect or aorist tenses for verbs that otherwise lacked the *sḱé-morpheme, such as the imperfect form φεύγεσκον (pheúgeskon, 'they would [habitually] flee'). Like Ionic Greek, the Hittite -ške/a-^{zi} suffix also could form an imperfective variant of a base verb, such as paiške/a- ('to give'), which is an iterative counterpart of pāi ('to give, pay'). This shared feature between Greek and Hittite has been explained as the result of areal contact between a dialect of Late Mycenaean Greek and a 13th-century BCE dialect of Hittite.

Similarly, in Classical Armenian, the aorist—which largely continued the PIE imperfect—can contain a -ց- (-cʻ-) extension, which may also derive from the *sḱé-suffix. It has been proposed that these Armenian and Greek formations are connected to each other, though the phylogenetic proximity between Armenian and Greek is not uncontroversial, and the linguist James Clackson proposes that these verbal formations are merely separate innovations. There are certain differences in the particular characteristics of the Armenian and Greek formations—Armenian weak aorists to monosyllabic stems are always augmented in the active third-person singular (i.e., ekn, 'stood'), whereas the Ionic iterative imperfects frequently lack the augment. Moreover, Ionic Greek primarily utilizes -εσκ- (-esk-) to form iterative imperfects, whereas Armenian instead largely uses -acʻ-.

The related Avestan suffix -sa- appears to have formed a past tense with a habitual meaning, though there is no semantic difference in the present tense. Otherwise, amongst the Iranian languages, the suffix is associated with inchoative semantics. For instance, the suffix appears in the inchoative Ossetian verb tæfs- ('to become hot') and the Khwarezmian verb ɣrʾs ('to wake up'). In Indo-Aryan, however, the Vedic Sanskrit verbs marked by the suffix -cchati, such as gácchati ('to go'), appear to showcase no identifiable semantic difference from other terms. In Hittite, this suffix remained productive, and—according to Sihler—it usually formed iterative verbs, though it could also seemingly produce terms with durative meanings. Alternatively, Kloekhorst argues that the Hittite suffix could communicate a wide array of imperfective meanings, be they iterative, distributive, durative, ingressive, and progressive. The Hittite suffix is often associated with exclusively mediopassive verbs, such as parkēšš- ('to become tall'), which forms a mediopassive imperfective verb parkiške/a-. Moreover, in Latin, there is a group of ancient deponent verbs in -(ī)scor that lack any corresponding present or perfect stems, such as nāscor ('to be born') and proficīscor ('to depart'). There is little attestation for the suffix in the other Anatolian languages beside Hittite, though the Luwian verb ta-az-tu ('let last, let endure') displays a continuative function and the verb kappilazzata ('become hostile') showcases inceptive semantics.

== Reduplicated sḱé-presents ==
The term γιγνώσκω (gignṓskō') perhaps represents a particular type of reduplicated *sḱé-present, which is perhaps continued in other words such as βιβρώσκω (bibrṓskō; 'to eat, swallow up') or διδάσκω (didáskō, 'to teach'). According to Sihler, these forms—in Ancient Greek—are often marked by their transitivity. There is perhaps evidence of a similar formation in Latin, with the term discō ('to learn') possibly deriving from *di-dḱ-sḱé-ti. In Hittite, there is likewise a connection between initial reduplicated and *sḱé-presents, as demonstrated by forms such as paripriške/a, which may reflect *pri-pr̥h₁-sḱé-ti. Certain Ancient Greek reduplicated *sḱé-presents coexist alongside unreduplicated variations of the same form, such as μιμνήσκω (mimnḗskō), which exists beside μνήσκεται (mnḗsketai). Both the LIV and Beekes suggest that the reduplicated form probably emerged as a secondary development from earlier μνήσκεται (mnḗsketai), itself perhaps from Proto-Indo-European *mn̥h₂-sḱé-ti. Regarding this particular form, however, Willi suggests that it probably emerged later as an artificial creation. Another such verb, ἱλάσκομαι (hiláskomai; 'to appease, to conciliate'), which appears to reflect Proto-Indo-European *si-sl̥h₂-sḱé-, is probably cognate with Old Armenian ałačʻem ('to pray'), which itself possibly continues quasi-Indo-European *sl̥h₂-sḱ-ye-.

This class of verbs in Ancient Greek has been explained as the result of a conflation between reduplicated and *sḱé-presents. However, according to Sihler, such a theory is marred by the lack of any clear explanation for why particularly these two forms would undergo a merger, as opposed to the numerous other classes of Indo-European verbs. According to Willi, the reduplicated *sḱé-present first developed as a means of imperfectivizing the reduplicated aorist, though this argument partially rests upon his other theory that the unreduplicated *sḱé-presents once served as imperfective counterparts to root aorists. In support of this theory, Willi notes the cooccurrence of certain reduplicated *sḱé-verbs and reduplicated aorists, such as the verb ἀραρίσκω (ararískō; 'to join, to fasten'), which exists alongside a reduplicated aorist ἤραρον (ḗraron). The archaic relationship between these two verb classes is, according to Willi, further indicated by the factitive semantics of many Homeric reduplicated *sḱé-presents, which parallels the generally factitive meaning of many archaic reduplicated aorists. Consequently, Willi suggests that the reduplicated *sḱé-class could not have emerged according to the model of perfect reduplication, as the perfect could not provide a factitive meaning. Nevertheless, not all reduplicated *sḱé-presents display factitive semantics, such as the verb τιτρώσκω (titrṓskō; 'to harm, to hurt'). Jasanoff also affirms the existence of a morphological process wherein reduplicated *sḱé-verbs were derived from reduplicated aorist. He considers this process an innovative Ancient Greek development that probably resulted from the model of pairs such as ἐδάην (edáēn, 'to teach') and διδάσκω (didáskō, 'to teach'), where the reduplicated present or the *sḱé-suffix was inherited from PIE.

== iske/o-presents ==
Certain Ancient Greek verbs display a particular suffix -ίσκω (-ískō), which—according to Willi emerged as a secondary inner-Greek development on the model of verbs such as ἀπαφίσκω (apaphískō) and εὑρίσκω (heurískō; 'to find, to discover'), wherein the -i- was first inserted so as to break-up unusual consonant clusters that resulted from the development of the PIE sequence *-C-sḱé-. Essentially, this theory maintains that a verb such as ἀραρίσκω (ararískō) was created to replace a putative *ἀρασκω (araskō). However, Willi does not the existence of τιτύσκομαι (titúskomai; 'to make ready, to prepare'), which does not display a similar aversion to such consonant clusters. There are similar suffixes in other Indo-European languages, though these formations are also explainable as innovative developments. For instance, the Latin suffix -īscō perhaps resulted from the affixation of -scō to fourth-conjugation verbs, a morphological process exemplified by the term concupīscō ('to desire strongly'), which derives from concupiō ('to covet'). On the basis of these formations, the element -īscō was then reanalyzed as a separate suffix, which was then freely reused to create verbs such as pacīscor ('to make a bargain'). Certain verbs in Old Armenian, such as tʻakʻčʻim ('to hide oneself') or pʻaxčʻim ('to flee'), may also display a similar suffix, though the morpheme -čʻ- is alternatively derived from *-éh₁sḱeti. Additional comparable forms exist in Hittite, where verbs such as appi/eske- and šarninki/eške- appear, with an epenthetic -i/e- vowel inserted between a root-final labial or velar stop or -ḫ- and the ške- suffix. This phonological development was perhaps perfectly regular for Hittite, as it is also attested for third-singular preterite forms such as akkiš, which belongs to the root akk- ('to die'). Other similar Hittite forms probably result from the contraction of word-medial -(i)ya-, such as the verbs wemiške- or ilališke-, which derive from wemye- and ilalye- respectively. This same phonological development is also attested for sequences such as appezzin, from appezziyan.

== éh₁sḱe-presents ==
The Latin suffix -ēscō, which forms ingressive verbs, perhaps reflects an additional Proto-Indo-European formation *-éh₁sḱeti, which is perhaps otherwise continued by the Old Armenian verbal ending -čʻim-. Hittite possesses a similar fientive suffix -ēšš-, though—according to Kloekhorst—this morpheme must instead be derived from *-éh₁-sh₁-, which perhaps to parallels the relation between *-šš(a)- (from *-s(o)h₁-) and *-sḱéti.

== See also ==
- Proto-Indo-European language
- Proto-Indo-European verbs
