= Eleanor Dickey =

American classicist, linguist

Professor Eleanor Dickey FBA
- Born: 9 April 1967 (age 59); New Haven, Connecticut, United States
- Title: Professor of Classics

Academic background
- Education: Bryn Mawr College (AB, MA); Balliol College, Oxford (MPhil); Merton College, Oxford (DPhil)
- Thesis: Greek forms of address: a linguistic analysis of selected prose authors (1994)
- Doctoral advisor: Anna Morpurgo Davies

Academic work
- Discipline: Classics
- Sub-discipline: Linguistics; Latin; Ancient Greek
- Institutions: University of Ottawa; Columbia University; University of Exeter; University of Reading

Eleanor Dickey FBA (born 9 April 1967) is an American classicist, linguist, and academic, who specialises in the history of the Latin and Greek languages. Since 2013, she has been Professor of Classics at the University of Reading in England.

== Early life and education ==
Dickey was born on 9 April 1967 in New Haven, Connecticut, United States. She was educated at Bryn Mawr College, graduating with both Bachelor of Arts (AB) and Master of Arts (MA) degrees in 1989. She then moved to England, and studied classics at Balliol College, Oxford, graduating with a Master of Philosophy (MPhil) degree in 1991. Dickey was awarded a Marshall Scholarship. She then undertook postgraduate research at Merton College, Oxford under the supervision of Anna Morpurgo Davies, and she completed her Doctor of Philosophy (DPhil) degree in 1994. Her doctoral thesis was titled "Greek forms of address: a linguistic analysis of selected prose authors".

== Academic career ==
From 1995 to 1999, Dickey was an assistant professor of classics at the University of Ottawa in Canada. She then moved to Columbia University in New York City, United States: she was an assistant professor from 1999 to 2005, and an associate professor from 2005 to 2007. She was a visiting academic at the Institute for Advanced Study in Princeton, New Jersey for the 1998/1999 academic year and at the Center for Hellenic Studies in Washington DC for the 2002/2003 academic year.

Having returned to England, Dickey was an associate professor of classics at the University of Exeter between 2007 and 2013. In 2013, she was appointed Professor of Classics at the University of Reading. She was awarded a Marc Fitch Fund Small Research Grant by the British Academy in 2012, and she held a Leverhulme Research Fellowship from 2013 to 2015.

== Personal life ==
In 2008, Dickey entered into a civil partnership with Philomen Probert. They have since been married.

== Honours ==
In 2014, Dickey was elected a Fellow of the British Academy (FBA), the United Kingdom's national academy for the humanities and social sciences. Also in 2014, she was elected as a Member of the Academia Europaea.

== Selected works ==
- Dickey, Eleanor (1996). Greek forms of address: from Herodotus to Lucian. Oxford: Clarendon Press. ISBN 978-0198150541.
- Dickey, Eleanor (2002). Latin forms of address: from Plautus to Apuleius. Oxford: Oxford University Press. ISBN 978-0199242870.
- Dickey, Eleanor (2007). Ancient Greek scholarship: a guide to finding, reading, and understanding scholia, commentaries, lexica, and grammatical treatises, from their beginnings to the Byzantine period. Oxford: Oxford University Press. ISBN 978-0195312928.
- Dickey, Eleanor and Anna Chahoud, eds. (2010) Colloquial and Literary Latin, Cambridge: Cambridge University Press, 2010
- Dickey, Eleanor, ed. (2012). The Colloquia of the Hermeneumata Pseudodositheana: Volume 1. Cambridge: Cambridge University Press. ISBN 978-1107020108.
- Dickey, Eleanor, ed. (2015). The Colloquia of the Hermeneumata Pseudodositheana: Volume 2. Cambridge: Cambridge University Press. ISBN 978-1107065390.
- Dickey, Eleanor (2016). An Introduction to the Composition and Analysis of Greek Prose. Cambridge: Cambridge University Press. ISBN 978-0521184250.
- Dickey, Eleanor (2016). Learning Latin the Ancient Way: Latin Textbooks from the Ancient World. Cambridge: Cambridge University Press. ISBN 978-1107093607.
