= Anatolian Hieroglyphs (Unicode block) =

- Range: U+14400..U+1467F (640 code points)
- Plane: SMP
- Scripts: Anatolian Hieroglyphs
- Assigned: 583 code points
- Unused: 57 reserved code points

Unicode Version History
- 8.0 (2015): 583 (+583)

Unicode documentation
- Code chart ∣ Web page

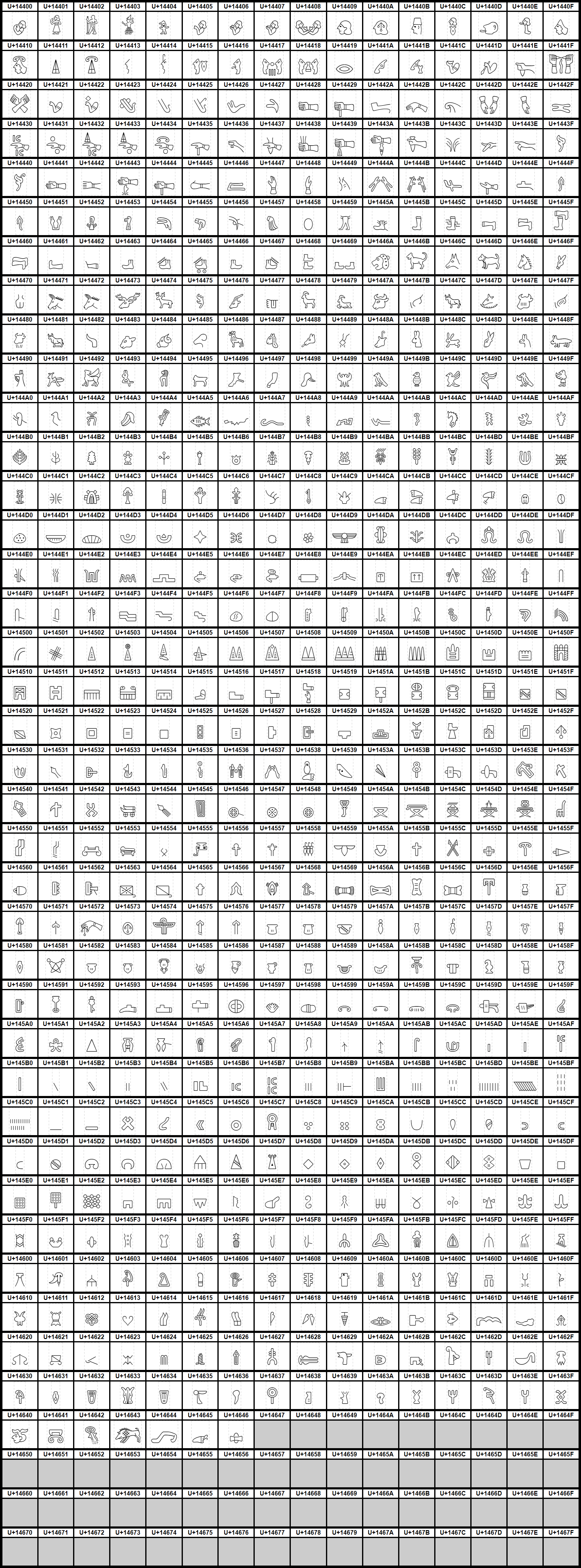
Graphical representation of the Anatolian Hieroglyphs Unicode block

Anatolian Hieroglyphs is a Unicode block containing Anatolian hieroglyphs, used to write the extinct Luwian language.

== Block ==
Anatolian Hieroglyphs^{[1]}^{[2]} Official Unicode Consortium code chart (PDF)
	0	1	2	3	4	5	6	7	8	9	A	B	C	D	E	F
U+1440x	𔐀	𔐁	𔐂	𔐃	𔐄	𔐅	𔐆	𔐇	𔐈	𔐉	𔐊	𔐋	𔐌	𔐍	𔐎	𔐏
U+1441x	𔐐	𔐑	𔐒	𔐓	𔐔	𔐕	𔐖	𔐗	𔐘	𔐙	𔐚	𔐛	𔐜	𔐝	𔐞	𔐟
U+1442x	𔐠	𔐡	𔐢	𔐣	𔐤	𔐥	𔐦	𔐧	𔐨	𔐩	𔐪	𔐫	𔐬	𔐭	𔐮	𔐯
U+1443x	𔐰	𔐱	𔐲	𔐳	𔐴	𔐵	𔐶	𔐷	𔐸	𔐹	𔐺	𔐻	𔐼	𔐽	𔐾	𔐿
U+1444x	𔑀	𔑁	𔑂	𔑃	𔑄	𔑅	𔑆	𔑇	𔑈	𔑉	𔑊	𔑋	𔑌	𔑍	𔑎	𔑏
U+1445x	𔑐	𔑑	𔑒	𔑓	𔑔	𔑕	𔑖	𔑗	𔑘	𔑙	𔑚	𔑛	𔑜	𔑝	𔑞	𔑟
U+1446x	𔑠	𔑡	𔑢	𔑣	𔑤	𔑥	𔑦	𔑧	𔑨	𔑩	𔑪	𔑫	𔑬	𔑭	𔑮	𔑯
U+1447x	𔑰	𔑱	𔑲	𔑳	𔑴	𔑵	𔑶	𔑷	𔑸	𔑹	𔑺	𔑻	𔑼	𔑽	𔑾	𔑿
U+1448x	𔒀	𔒁	𔒂	𔒃	𔒄	𔒅	𔒆	𔒇	𔒈	𔒉	𔒊	𔒋	𔒌	𔒍	𔒎	𔒏
U+1449x	𔒐	𔒑	𔒒	𔒓	𔒔	𔒕	𔒖	𔒗	𔒘	𔒙	𔒚	𔒛	𔒜	𔒝	𔒞	𔒟
U+144Ax	𔒠	𔒡	𔒢	𔒣	𔒤	𔒥	𔒦	𔒧	𔒨	𔒩	𔒪	𔒫	𔒬	𔒭	𔒮	𔒯
U+144Bx	𔒰	𔒱	𔒲	𔒳	𔒴	𔒵	𔒶	𔒷	𔒸	𔒹	𔒺	𔒻	𔒼	𔒽	𔒾	𔒿
U+144Cx	𔓀	𔓁	𔓂	𔓃	𔓄	𔓅	𔓆	𔓇	𔓈	𔓉	𔓊	𔓋	𔓌	𔓍	𔓎	𔓏
U+144Dx	𔓐	𔓑	𔓒	𔓓	𔓔	𔓕	𔓖	𔓗	𔓘	𔓙	𔓚	𔓛	𔓜	𔓝	𔓞	𔓟
U+144Ex	𔓠	𔓡	𔓢	𔓣	𔓤	𔓥	𔓦	𔓧	𔓨	𔓩	𔓪	𔓫	𔓬	𔓭	𔓮	𔓯
U+144Fx	𔓰	𔓱	𔓲	𔓳	𔓴	𔓵	𔓶	𔓷	𔓸	𔓹	𔓺	𔓻	𔓼	𔓽	𔓾	𔓿
U+1450x	𔔀	𔔁	𔔂	𔔃	𔔄	𔔅	𔔆	𔔇	𔔈	𔔉	𔔊	𔔋	𔔌	𔔍	𔔎	𔔏
U+1451x	𔔐	𔔑	𔔒	𔔓	𔔔	𔔕	𔔖	𔔗	𔔘	𔔙	𔔚	𔔛	𔔜	𔔝	𔔞	𔔟
U+1452x	𔔠	𔔡	𔔢	𔔣	𔔤	𔔥	𔔦	𔔧	𔔨	𔔩	𔔪	𔔫	𔔬	𔔭	𔔮	𔔯
U+1453x	𔔰	𔔱	𔔲	𔔳	𔔴	𔔵	𔔶	𔔷	𔔸	𔔹	𔔺	𔔻	𔔼	𔔽	𔔾	𔔿
U+1454x	𔕀	𔕁	𔕂	𔕃	𔕄	𔕅	𔕆	𔕇	𔕈	𔕉	𔕊	𔕋	𔕌	𔕍	𔕎	𔕏
U+1455x	𔕐	𔕑	𔕒	𔕓	𔕔	𔕕	𔕖	𔕗	𔕘	𔕙	𔕚	𔕛	𔕜	𔕝	𔕞	𔕟
U+1456x	𔕠	𔕡	𔕢	𔕣	𔕤	𔕥	𔕦	𔕧	𔕨	𔕩	𔕪	𔕫	𔕬	𔕭	𔕮	𔕯
U+1457x	𔕰	𔕱	𔕲	𔕳	𔕴	𔕵	𔕶	𔕷	𔕸	𔕹	𔕺	𔕻	𔕼	𔕽	𔕾	𔕿
U+1458x	𔖀	𔖁	𔖂	𔖃	𔖄	𔖅	𔖆	𔖇	𔖈	𔖉	𔖊	𔖋	𔖌	𔖍	𔖎	𔖏
U+1459x	𔖐	𔖑	𔖒	𔖓	𔖔	𔖕	𔖖	𔖗	𔖘	𔖙	𔖚	𔖛	𔖜	𔖝	𔖞	𔖟
U+145Ax	𔖠	𔖡	𔖢	𔖣	𔖤	𔖥	𔖦	𔖧	𔖨	𔖩	𔖪	𔖫	𔖬	𔖭	𔖮	𔖯
U+145Bx	𔖰	𔖱	𔖲	𔖳	𔖴	𔖵	𔖶	𔖷	𔖸	𔖹	𔖺	𔖻	𔖼	𔖽	𔖾	𔖿
U+145Cx	𔗀	𔗁	𔗂	𔗃	𔗄	𔗅	𔗆	𔗇	𔗈	𔗉	𔗊	𔗋	𔗌	𔗍	𔗎	𔗏
U+145Dx	𔗐	𔗑	𔗒	𔗓	𔗔	𔗕	𔗖	𔗗	𔗘	𔗙	𔗚	𔗛	𔗜	𔗝	𔗞	𔗟
U+145Ex	𔗠	𔗡	𔗢	𔗣	𔗤	𔗥	𔗦	𔗧	𔗨	𔗩	𔗪	𔗫	𔗬	𔗭	𔗮	𔗯
U+145Fx	𔗰	𔗱	𔗲	𔗳	𔗴	𔗵	𔗶	𔗷	𔗸	𔗹	𔗺	𔗻	𔗼	𔗽	𔗾	𔗿
U+1460x	𔘀	𔘁	𔘂	𔘃	𔘄	𔘅	𔘆	𔘇	𔘈	𔘉	𔘊	𔘋	𔘌	𔘍	𔘎	𔘏
U+1461x	𔘐	𔘑	𔘒	𔘓	𔘔	𔘕	𔘖	𔘗	𔘘	𔘙	𔘚	𔘛	𔘜	𔘝	𔘞	𔘟
U+1462x	𔘠	𔘡	𔘢	𔘣	𔘤	𔘥	𔘦	𔘧	𔘨	𔘩	𔘪	𔘫	𔘬	𔘭	𔘮	𔘯
U+1463x	𔘰	𔘱	𔘲	𔘳	𔘴	𔘵	𔘶	𔘷	𔘸	𔘹	𔘺	𔘻	𔘼	𔘽	𔘾	𔘿
U+1464x	𔙀	𔙁	𔙂	𔙃	𔙄	𔙅	𔙆									
U+1465x																
U+1466x																
U+1467x																
Notes 1.As of Unicode version 17.0 2.Grey areas indicate non-assigned code points

== History ==
The following Unicode-related documents record the purpose and process of defining specific characters in the Anatolian Hieroglyphs block:

Version	Final code points (Note: Proposed code points and characters names may differ from final code points and names)	Count	L2 ID	WG2 ID	Document
8.0	U+14400..14646	583	L2/99-068		Everson, Michael (1999-02-11), Luvian script
8.0	U+14400..14646	583	L2/06-305	N3144	Everson, Michael (2006-09-20), Preliminary proposal to encode Anatolian Hieroglyphs in the SMP of the UCS
8.0	U+14400..14646	583	L2/07-096	N3236R	Everson, Michael (2007-05-01), Proposal to encode Anatolian Hieroglyphs in the SMP of the UCS
8.0	U+14400..14646	583	L2/07-268	N3253 (pdf, doc)	Umamaheswaran, V. S. (2007-07-26), "8.16", Unconfirmed minutes of WG 2 meeting 50, Frankfurt-am-Main, Germany; 2007-04-24/27
8.0	U+14400..14646	583	L2/11-363	N4147	Everson, Michael (2011-10-21), Revised code chart for Anatolian Hieroglyphs
8.0	U+14400..14646	583	L2/12-136	N4264	Everson, Michael (2012-05-02), Revised proposal to encode Anatolian Hieroglyphs in the SMP of the UCS
8.0	U+14400..14646	583	L2/12-213	N4282	Everson, Michael (2012-07-15), Final proposal to encode Anatolian Hieroglyphs in the SMP of the UCS
8.0	U+14400..14646	583	L2/13-120	N4441	Anderson, Deborah (2013-05-08), Anatolian RA or RI
8.0	U+14400..14646	583		N4353 (pdf, doc)	"M60.08", Unconfirmed minutes of WG 2 meeting 60, 2013-05-23
8.0	U+14400..14646	583	L2/13-132		Moore, Lisa (2013-07-29), "Consensus 136-C18", UTC #136 Minutes, "Approve 583 Anatolian Hieroglyphs at U+14400..U+14646, with block Anatolian Hieroglyphs at U+14400..U+1467F, with code points, names, and glyphs as shown in L2/13-151 for encoding in a future version of the standard."
8.0	U+14400..14646	583		N4403 (pdf, doc)	Umamaheswaran, V. S. (2014-01-28), "Resolution M61.02 item e", Unconfirmed minutes of WG 2 meeting 61, Holiday Inn, Vilnius, Lithuania; 2013-06-10/14
