= Andreas Willi =

Swiss linguist (born 1972)

Andreas Jonathan Willi FBA (born 17 December 1972 in Altstätten) is a Swiss linguist, philologist, and classicist. He is currently the Diebold Professor of Comparative Philology at the University of Oxford and a professorial fellow of Worcester College, Oxford. He is one of the editors of Glotta. In 2020, he was elected a Fellow of the British Academy. In 2019, Willi was awarded the Humboldt Prize.

== Academic career ==
Willi studied Classics and Slavonic Languages and Literature at the University of Basel (lic.phil. in 1997), and comparative philology at the Universities of Lausanne, Michigan, and Fribourg (lic.phil in 1998). He completed a doctoral degree at the University of Oxford in 2001 with a thesis on The languages of Aristophanes: aspects of linguistic variation in Classical Attic Greek under the supervision of Anna Morpurgo Davies. During his time at Oxford, he was a member of Corpus Christi College. Between 2001 and 2004, he was a lecturer for Latin and Greek philology at the University of Basel, before joining the Istituto Svizzero di Roma as a researcher. He was called to the chair of comparative philology at Oxford in 2005.

== Selected publications ==
- Willi, Andreas (2002). The Language of Greek Comedy. Oxford: Oxford University Press.
- Willi, Andreas (2003). The Languages of Aristophanes: Aspects of Linguistic Variation in Classical Attic. Oxford: Oxford University Press.
- Willi, Andreas (2008). Sikelismos: Sprache, Literatur und Gesellschaft im griechischen Sizilien. Bern: Schwabe Verlag.
- Willi, Andreas; Probert, Philomen (2012). Laws and Rules in Indo-European. Oxford: Oxford University Press.
- Willi, Andreas (2018). Origins of the Greek Verb. Cambridge: Cambridge University Press.
