= Anna Chahoud =

Irish classicist

Academic background
- Education: University of Bologna (BA); University of Pisa (PhD)

Academic work
- Discipline: Classicist
- Sub-discipline: Latin literature and linguistics
- Institutions: Trinity College Dublin

Anna Chahoud is Professor of Latin in the Department of Classics at Trinity College Dublin, and is known for her research on Latin literature and linguistics.

== Education ==
Anna Chahoud holds a BA in classics from the University of Bologna (1991) and a PhD in Greek and Latin philology from the University of Pisa (1996).

== Career ==
Chahoud has worked at the University of Reading (1997–1998), the University of Durham (1998–1999) and University College Dublin. She joined Trinity College Dublin in 2006. As well as holding the Chair of Latin, she is a Fellow and Public Orator at Trinity College Dublin, where she also convenes the 'Manuscript, Book, and Print Cultures' research theme. Her other academic appointments include positions as an invited Visiting Scholar at All Souls College, Oxford (2008) and visiting scientist at the Scuola Normale Superiore, Pisa (2012); she is a member of the international Ancient European Languages And Writings research group and is a Consulting Editor for the Bryn Mawr Classical Review.

Chahoud's research interests include fragmentary early Latin texts (especially satire), the transmission of these texts from antiquity to the early modern period, Latin linguistic registers, and the interaction between literary and spoken language. Her most important publications in these fields include C. Lucili Reliquiarum concordantiae (1998) and Colloquial and Literary Latin (co-edited with Eleanor Dickey); as of 2019, she is working on a new edition and the first English-language commentary of Lucilius' satires and on a Loeb Classical Library collection of fragmentary satire, political invective and popular verse.

== Selected publications ==
=== Books ===
- Chahoud, Anna C. Lucilii Reliquiarum Concordantiae, Hildesheim-Zürich-New York, Olms-Weidmann, 1998

=== Edited books ===
- Chahoud, Anna Fabellae Dublinenses Revisited and Other Essays In honour of M. L. Colker (Hermathena Special Issue 2017), Dublin, 2017
- Chahoud, Anna (with Dickey, E.)Colloquial and Literary Latin, Cambridge, Cambridge University Press, 2010

=== Articles and book chapters ===
- Chahoud, Anna "Lucilius on Latin spelling, grammar and usage" in Giuseppe Pezzini and Barney Taylor (eds), Nature and Language in the Classical Roman World, Cambridge, Cambridge University Press, 2019, pp. 46–78
- Chahoud, Anna "Verbal Mosaics: Speech Patterns and Generic Stylisation in Lucilius" in B.W. Breed, Rex Wallace, and E. Keitel (eds.) Our Lucilius: Satire in Second Century Rome, Cambridge, Cambridge University Press, 2018, pp. 132–161
- Chahoud, Anna "Quid ago? Quid facimus? 'Deliberative' Indicative Questions from Early to Late Latin" in J. N. Adams and Nigel Vincent (eds), Early and Late Latin: Continuity and Change, Cambridge, Cambridge University Press, 2016, pp. 217–245
- Chahoud, Anna "Varro's Latin and Varro on Latin" in R. Ferri and A. Zago (eds.), The Latin of the Grammarians: Reflections about Language in the Roman World, Pisa, 2016, pp. 15–31
- Chahoud, Anna "Lucilio: L'invenzione di un'identità" in Luca Canali (ed), Altri classici, 2013, pp. 1–14
- Chahoud, Anna "The Language of Roman Verse Satire" in James Clackson (ed), Blackwell Companion to the Latin Language, Malden, MA and Oxford, Blackwell, 2011
- Chahoud, Anna "Idiom(s) and literariness in classical literary criticism" in Eleanor Dickey and Anna Chahoud (eds), Colloquial and Literary Latin, Cambridge, Cambridge University Press, 2010, pp. 42–64
- Chahoud, Anna "Antiquity and Authority in Nonius Marcellus" in David Scourfield (ed), Texts and Culture in Late Antiquity: Inheritance, Authority, and Change, Classical Press of Wales, 2007, pp. 69–96
- Chahoud, Anna "The Roman satirist speaks Greek", Classics Ireland, 11, 2004, p. 1–46
