= Diebold Professor of Comparative Philology =

Professorship in comparative philology at the University of Oxford

The position of Diebold Professor of Comparative Philology (designated the Professor of Comparative Philology 1868–82 and 1925–2003, and known as the Corpus Christi Professor of Comparative Philology 1882–1925) is a professorship in comparative philology at the University of Oxford. The professor's duties are "to lecture and give instruction in Indo-European and the history and comparative philology of the Indo-European languages."

The professorship was created for the German academic Max Müller in 1868. It was called the "Corpus Christi" Professorship because a commission in 1877, led by Roundell Palmer, 1st Earl of Selborne, recommended that the richest colleges should help the university by providing funds for chairs. Corpus Christi College was reluctant – partly because of the cost involved at a time when the college's income was affected by an agricultural recession, but also because the fellows of the college feared that they would be outvoted by professors. Although the chair was renamed as the Corpus Christi professorship in 1882 on the basis that provision had been made to endow the chair out of the college's revenues, the college never provided sufficient funds to establish a full endowment for the chair, and its obligation to do so (to the college's relief) was removed in 1925. The chair was renamed in 2003 after Professor A. Richard Diebold Jr., to mark his donation to the university to support the chair. It is now associated with a fellowship of Worcester College, although Anna Morpurgo Davies (appointed in 1971) was a fellow of Somerville College instead because at that time Worcester did not have women fellows.

== List of Diebold Professors of Comparative Philology ==
The academics to have held the position are:

- 1868–1900: Max Müller
  - 1876–1890: Archibald Sayce, Deputy Professor
  - 1891–1901: Joseph Wright, Deputy Professor
- 1901–1925: Joseph Wright
- 1925–1952: Gustav Braunholtz
- 1952–1971: Leonard Palmer
- 1971–2004: Anna Morpurgo Davies
- 2005–present: Andreas Willi
