= Bonus2.vir2 =

Phrase in Anatolian hieroglyphics

Bonus2.vir2 is the conventional Latin transliteration for the Anatolian hieroglyphic expression given by the signs L362.L386. This expression is typically present in Hittite glyphs from the late imperial period, and are usually considered an expression of good luck (note Güterbock 1975). According to recent studies (Massi 2009) Bonus2.vir2 is likely to be considered an indicator of a specific social class, probably the nobility.
