= Indigo Traveller =

Travel documentary brand

- Born: Nick Fisher
- Occupation: YouTuber

YouTube information
- Years active: 2016–present
- Genre: Travel vlogger
- Subscribers: 2.05 million
- Views: 269 million
- Last updated: 29 July 2023

Indigo Traveller is the brand of New Zealand travel documentary filmmaker Nick Fisher. His travel films are posted to YouTube and include trips to North Korea, Romania, Senegal, The Gambia, India, Mozambique, Cambodia, Mongolia, Madagascar, Morocco, Russia, Iran, Kazakhstan, Iraq, Bangladesh, Israel, Turkey, South Africa, Poland, Ghana, Jamaica, Armenia, Georgia, Cuba, Pakistan, South Sudan, Ethiopia, Honduras, Argentina, North Macedonia, Somalia, Libya, Peru, Kenya, Egypt, Albania, Vietnam, Nepal, Afghanistan, Venezuela, Ukraine, Yemen, Lebanon, Syria, Brazil, Nigeria, and Haiti. Fisher was 26 in 2018. He has 2.07 million subscribers on his YouTube channel as of September 9, 2026.

He has travelled to areas considered dangerous or poor. He is currently based in Hungary.

In 2020, he was touring Tripoli, Lebanon, when a shooting broke out.

== See also ==
- Vice Media
- Lonely Planet
