= Nick Fisher (historian) =

British historian of ancient Greece

Academic background
- Education: Christ Church, Oxford; Pembroke College, Oxford
- Thesis: The concept of hybris in Greece from Homer to the fourth century BC
- Doctoral advisors: John Gould, then John K. Davies

Academic work
- Discipline: Ancient history
- Institutions: Cardiff University
- Doctoral students: Lloyd Llewellyn-Jones

Nicolas Ralph Edmund Fisher is a British historian of ancient Greece, known primarily for his work on ancient Greek moral and social values.

== Biography ==
Fisher studied at Christ Church, Oxford and then at Pembroke College, Oxford. He obtained his doctorate in 1977 with a thesis titled "The concept of hybris in Greece from Homer to the fourth century BC", supervised initially by John Gould and then primarily by John K. Davies.

In 1970, he was appointed Lecturer in Classics at Cardiff University (then the University College of South Wales and Monmouthshire), where he remained for the rest of his career. In 1992, he published his most important book, Hybris: A Study in the Values of Honour and Shame in Ancient Greece. His doctoral students at Cardiff included Lloyd Llewellyn-Jones.

Fisher's retirement was marked by a colloquium in May 2009, which gave rise to a Festschrift volume in his honour, Sociable Man: Essays on Ancient Greek Social Behaviour in Honour of Nick Fisher.

== Selected publications ==
=== Monographs ===
- Fisher, Nick (1992). Hybris: A Study in the Values of Honour and Shame in Ancient Greece. Aris and Phillips. ISBN 9780856681448.
- Fisher, Nick (1993). Slavery in Classical Greece. Bristol Classical Press. ISBN 9781853991349.

=== Edition of an ancient text ===
- Fisher, Nick (2001). Aeschines: Against Timarchos. Oxford University Press. ISBN 9780199241569.

=== Edited volumes ===
- Fisher, Nick; van Wees, Hans, eds. (1998). Archaic Greece: New Approaches and New Evidence. Duckworth. ISBN 9781914535314.
- Westgate, Ruth C.; Fisher, Nick; Whitley, James, eds. (2007). Building Communities: House, Settlement and Society in the Aegean and Beyond. British School at Athens. ISBN 9780904887563.
- Fisher, Nick; van Wees, Hans, eds. (2011). Competition in the Ancient World. Classical Press of Wales. ISBN 9781905125487.
- van Wees, Hans; Fisher, Nick, eds. (2015). "Aristocracy" in Antiquity: Redefining Greek and Roman Elites. Classical Press of Wales. ISBN 9781910589014.
