= Leonard Robert Palmer =

English linguist and archaeologist (1906–1984)

Leonard Robert Palmer (5 June 1906, Bristol – 26 August 1984, Pitney, Somerset) was author and Professor of Comparative Philology at the University of Oxford from 1952 to 1971. He was also a Fellow of Worcester College, Oxford. Palmer made some significant contributions to the study of Classical languages, and in the area of historical linguistics.

== Career ==
Palmer was educated at Cardiff High School, the University of South Wales, Trinity College, Cambridge, and the University of Vienna, where he studied with Paul Kretschmer.

He started his academic career in 1931, teaching classics at Manchester University. He held the Chair of Classical Literature at King's College, London between 1945 and 1946, followed by the Chair of Greek there from 1946 to 1952. From the 1930s he served as one of the general editors of The Great Languages book series (Faber & Faber; Humanities Press).

During World War II, Palmer worked at the Government Code and Cypher School at Bletchley Park, at the so-called Hut 4. Their work was the translation, interpretation and distribution of enemy messages.

A strong focus of Palmer's work was the Greek linguistics, and in particular the language and dating of the Mycenaean Linear B tablets. He also researched the pre-Greek languages in the Aegean Sea area, their origin and chronology. Palmer also wrote an influential historical and linguistic survey of the Latin language; he later followed this with a companion work on the Greek language, focusing on its development from Linear B and its evolution into multiple dialects throughout the Aegean region.

Palmer played a role in the controversies over the dating of archaeological finds from Minoan Crete, where he disagreed with the excavator, Sir Arthur Evans, and favoured a later date.

In his book Descriptive & Comparative Linguistics (1972), among other things, he took issue with the Chomskian linguistics.

== Proto-Greek studies ==
Palmer was one of the linguists who were investigating the theories that some unknown language or languages were spoken in prehistoric Greece before the settlement of Proto-Greek speakers in the area. So this is the question of an ancient linguistic Pre-Greek substrate in Greece. According to Palmer, this may have been one of the ancient Anatolian languages, perhaps a Luwian language. He suggested that the language of Linear A might be Luwian on the basis of -ss- and -nd- (corresponding to -ss- and -nth- in mainland Greece) placenames being widespread in Western Anatolia.

== Honours ==
Palmer was elected Secretary and then President of the British Philological Society. He was also a corresponding member of the Deutsches Archäologisches Institut. In 1981, he received an honorary doctorate from the University of Innsbruck.

== Publications ==
- The Greek Language (The Great Languages), 355 Pages, Published 1954 by Faber & Faber and in 1980 by Humanities Press ISBN 0-391-01203-7
- Descriptive & Comparative Linguistics (Updated) A Critical Introduction (Studies in General Linguistics), Paperback, 430 Pages, Published 1979 by Faber & Faber ISBN 0-571-10690-0
- The Latin Language, Paperback, 372 Pages, Published 1988 by University Of Oklahoma Press. ISBN 0-8061-2136-X
- New Guide to the Palace of Knossos, Hardcover, 144 Pages, Published 1969 by Faber And Faber ISBN 0-571-08727-2
- Interpretation of Mycenaean Greek Texts (Oxford University Press academic monograph reprints) ISBN 0198131445
- On the Knossos Tablets: The Find-places of the Knossos Tablets. Book, 1963. 251 p.
- Mycenaeans and Minoans; Aegean Prehistory in the light of the Linear B tablets. 2d rev. ed. 1965. 368 p
- A Grammar of the Post-Ptolemaic Papyri (15 editions published between 1945 and 1948)
- The Language of Homer (1962)
- Aegean Chronology (1984)
- Palmer, L. R. (1958). "Luvian and Linear A". Transactions of the Philological Society. 57: 75–100. doi:10.1111/j.1467-968X.1958.tb01273.x.
