= Anna Morpurgo Davies =

Italian philologist (1937–2014)

Anna Morpurgo Davies DBE FSA FBA
- Born: Anna Elbina Morpurgo; 21 June 1937; Milan, Kingdom of Italy
- Died: 27 September 2014 (aged 77)
- Education: University of Rome La Sapienza
- Occupation: Professor of Comparative Philology
- Employer(s): Somerville College; University of Oxford
- Known for: Studies of Indo-European, Greek, and Anatolian linguistics; Linear B; history of linguistics
- Spouse: John K. Davies (m. 1962; div. 1978)

Anna Elbina Morpurgo Davies DBE FSA FBA (21 June 1937 – 27 September 2014) was an Italian philologist who specialised in comparative Indo-European linguistics. She spent her career at Oxford University, where she was the Professor of Comparative Philology and Fellow of Somerville College.

== Personal life and education ==
Anna Elbina Morpurgo was born in Milan, the fourth child of a Jewish family. Her grandfather Guido Castelnuovo was a mathematician; her father, Augusto Morpurgo, was dismissed in 1938 under the Fascist racial laws and died the following year after trying to find a way to take his family to Argentina. She and her mother Maria moved to Rome, where they survived with false papers and in hiding.

She earned her doctorate in classics from the University of Rome with a thesis on Linear B; she published the first lexicon of the language in 1963.

In 1961 she moved to Washington, D.C., where she met the classical historian John K. Davies. They married the following year, and both moved to Oxford. The marriage was dissolved in 1978.

== Academic career ==
In 1961 she became a post-doctoral fellow at Harvard University's Center for Hellenic Studies in Washington, D.C., where she formed a deep interest in theoretical linguistics; she was later to help establish a chair in the subject at Oxford University. She moved to Oxford in 1962, became a lecturer in Classical Philology in 1964, and spent the remainder of her career there with the exception of visiting professorships at the University of Pennsylvania, Yale University and the University of California at Berkeley and guest lecturing at the University of Cincinnati, Stanford University and Harvard University.

In 1966 Morpurgo Davies became a fellow of St Hilda's College; in 1971 she was appointed to the Chair in Comparative Philology and became a fellow of Somerville. In 2003 this became the Diebold Chair. She was also a Delegate of the Oxford University Press from 1992 to 2004, when she retired, as well as serving as President of the Philological Society (1976–80; thereafter Honorary Vice-president) and of the Henry Sweet Society for the History of Linguistic Ideas (1991–3, Vice President thereafter).

== Research ==
Morpurgo Davies published in many areas of Indo-European grammar. She was particularly known as an expert in the Anatolian languages, and was one of the decipherers of Luwian hieroglyphs. She was also known for her work on Mycenaean Greek and on the development of linguistics in the nineteenth century; in 1996 she published an Italian-language history of the latter, La linguistica dell'Ottocento, and in 1998 she was responsible for the volume on that century in the Longman History of Linguistics, where a reviewer found she set aside the overall editorial aim of tracing the development of linguistic thought in favour of presenting a history of the development of Indo-European linguistics in Europe and the United States. In 1984 she was joint editor of The Great Languages book series (Faber & Faber; Humanities Press).

In 2005 a reviewer at The Times referred to her "trend-setting work in onomastics, Greek dialectology, Mycenaean lexicography, Anatolian languages, writing systems, history of scholarship and social history".

== Honours ==
Davies was made a fellow of the Society of Antiquaries of London in 1974 and of the British Academy in 1985. She was an honorary or corresponding member of the American Academy of Arts and Sciences, the Austrian Academy of Sciences, the Linguistic Society of America, the Academia Europaea, the American Philosophical Society, the French Académie des Inscriptions et Belles-Lettres, the Bavarian Academy of Sciences and Humanities, and the Italian Accademia dei Lincei. She became an honorary fellow of St Hilda's College in 1972 and was awarded honorary doctorates by the University of St Andrews and the University of Nancy.

In 2001, she became an honorary Dame Commander of the Order of the British Empire; since she was not a British citizen, she could not use the "Dame" title, but was able to use the post-nominals DBE.

In 2005 a festschrift was published in her honour, Indo-European Perspectives: Studies in Honour of Anna Morpurgo Davies.

After Davies's death, a joint annual lecture series organised by the British Academy and the Philological Society was named in her honour; the Philological Society also established an Anna Morpurgo Davies Bursary to support Master's students working on ancient languages.

== Publications ==
=== Books ===
- 1963: Mycenaeae Graecitatis Lexicon. Roma: Edizioni dell'Ateneo.
- 1966 – 1974–5: (& all. (eds.)). Studies in Mycenaean Inscriptions and Dialect, vols. 12–20. London: Institute of Classical Studies.
- 1973: (with J. D. Hawkins & G. Neumann). Hittite Hieroglyphs and Luwian: New Evidence for the Connection. Göttingen: Vandenhoeck und Ruprecht.
- 1976: (with W. Meid, eds.). Studies in Greek, Italic and Indo-European Linguistics, offered to L. R. Palmer. Innsbruck: Innsbruck Institut für Sprachwissenschaft.
- 1985: (with Y. Duhoux, eds.). Linear B. A 1984 Survey. Louvain-la-Neuve: Cabay (reprinted: Louvain 1988: Peeters).
- 1996: La linguistica dell' Ottocento. Bologna: Il Mulino [Italian translation of an earlier version of the next title].
- 1998: Nineteenth-Century Linguistics, vol. 4 of G. Lepschy (ed.) History of Linguistics. London: Longman.
- 2008–14: (with Y. Duhoux, eds.). A Companion to Linear B. Mycenaean Greek Texts and their World, vol. 1 (2008), vol. 2 (2011), vol. 3 (2014). Louvain: Peeters.

=== Selected articles ===
==== Linear B and Mycenaean Greek ====
- 1958: ‘Damar in Miceneo’. La Parola del Passato [PdP], 322–24.
- 1960 b: ‘Il genitivo miceneo e il sincretismo dei casi’. Rendiconti dell' Accademia dei Lincei 15, 33–61.
- 1961: ‘L'esito delle nasali sonanti in miceneo’. Rendiconti dell' Accademia dei Lincei, 15, 321–36.
- 1966: ‘An instrumental-ablative in Mycenaean?’. In Proceedings of the Cambridge Colloquium on Mycenaean Studies (L.R. Palmer & J. Chadwick, eds.), 191–202. Cambridge: Cambridge University Press.
- 1968 c: ‘The treatment of r and l in Mycenaean and Arcado-Cyprian’. In Atti e Memorie del Primo Congresso Internazionale di Micenologia, 791–814. Roma: Edizioni dell’Ateneo.
- 1968 d: ‘Fabbri e schiavi a Pilo’. La Parola del Passato, 220–22.
- 1972: ‘Greek and Indo-European semiconsonants: Mycenaean u and w’. In Acta Mycenaea, vol. 2 (M. S. Ruipérez, ed.), 80–121. Salamanca: Universidad de Salamanca.
- 1979 c: ‘Terminology of power and terminology of work in Greek and Linear B’. In Colloquium Mycenaeum (E. Risch & H. Mühlestein, eds.), 87–108. Neuchatel: Neuchâtel, Faculté des Lettres.
- 1983: ‘Mycenaean and Greek prepositions: o-pi, e-pi etc.’. In Res Mycenaeae. Akten des VII. Int. Mykenologischen Colloquiums (A. Heubeck & G. Neumann, eds.), 287–310. Göttingen: Vandenhoeck & Ruprecht.
- 1985: ‘Mycenaean and Greek language’. In Linear B: a 1984 Survey (A. Morpurgo Davies & Y. Duhoux, eds.), 75–125. Louvain-la-Neuve: Cabay.
- 1986 a: ‘Forms of writing in the ancient Mediterranean world’. In The Written Word. Literacy in Transition (G. Baumann, ed.), 55–77. Oxford: Oxford University Press.
- 1986 c: ‘The linguistic evidence: is there any?’. In The end of the Early Bronze Age in the Aegean (G. Cadogan, ed.), 93–123. Leiden: Brill.
- 1999 b: ‘The Morphology of personal Names in Mycenaean and Greek: Some observations’. In Floreant Studia Mycenaea. Akten des X. internationalen mykenologischen Colloquiums in Salzburg von 1–5 Mai 1995 (S. Deger-Jalkotzy, S. Hiller & O. Panagl, eds.), 389–405. Vienna: Oesterreichische Akademie der Wissenschaften.
- 2006 a: ‘Linguistic evidence from the Thebes Texts in Linear B (handout)’. In Die neuen Linear B-Texte aus Theben (S. Deger-Jalkotzy & O. Panagl, eds.), 119–24. Wien: Verlag der Oesterreichischen Akademie der Wissenschaften.
- 1992 f: ‘Mycenaean, Arcadian, Cyprian and some questions of method in dialectology’. In Mykenaika (Suppl. XXV to Bulletin de correspondance hellénique) (J.P. Olivier, ed.), 415–32. Athens - Paris: Ecole française d’Athènes.
- 2012 a: (& J.-P. Olivier). ‘Syllabic Scripts and Languages in the Second and First Millennia BC’. In Parallel Lives: Ancient Island Societies in Crete and Cyprus (G. Cadogan et al., eds.), BSA Studies 20, 105–18. London: BSA.
- 2012 c: ‘Open problems in Mycenaean phonology and the Input of morphology’. In Etudes mycéniennes 2010. Actes du XIIIe colloque international sur les textes égéens (Carlier, P. et al., eds.), 511–22. Pisa - Roma: Serra Editore.

==== Linear A and 'Minoan' ====
- 1969 b: ‘The structure of the Minoan language’. Bulletin of the Institute of Classical Studies [BICS], London, 16, 161–62.
- 1971 c: (& G. Cadogan). ‘A Linear A tablet from Pyrgos, Myrtos, Crete’. Kadmos 10, 105–09.
- 1977: (& G. Cadogan). ‘A second Linear A tablet from Pyrgos’. Kadmos 16, 7–9.

==== Archaic and classical Greek linguistics ====
- 1960 a: ‘Kτίλος (Pind. Pyth. II 17)’. Rivista di Cultura Classica e Medioevale [RCCM] 2, 30–40.
- 1960 c: ‘Il genitivo maschile in -ας’. Glotta 39, 93–111.
- 1964 a: ‘'Doric' features in the language of Hesiod’. Glotta 42, 138–65.
- 1964 b: ‘SEG XI 1112 e il sincretismo dei casi in arcade-cipriota’. La Parola del Passato, 346–54.
- 1965: ‘A note on Thessalian’. Glotta 43, 235–51.
- 1968 a: ‘Thessalian patronymic adjectives’. Glotta 46, 85–106.
- 1968 b: ‘Article and demonstrative: a note’. Glotta 46, 76–85.
- 1968 e: ‘Gender and the development of the Greek declensions’. Transactions of the Philological Society [TPhS] 67.1, 12–36.
- 1969 a: ‘Epigraphical -φι’. Glotta 47, 46–54.
- 1970 a: (& L. H. Jeffery). ‘Ποινικαστάς and ποινικάζεν. BM 1969, 4-2.1. A new archaic inscription from Crete’. Kadmos 9, 118–54.
- 1970 b: ‘Cretan δριωτον’. Classical Review [CR] 20, 280–82.
- 1971 a: (& L. H. Jeffery). ‘An archaic Greek inscription from Crete’. The British Museum Quarterly 36, 24–29.
- 1971 b: (& B. Levick). ‘Κοπτοπώλης’. Classical Review 21, 162–66.
- 1976: ‘The -εσσι datives, Aeolic- -ss- and the Lesbian poets’. In Studies L. R. Palmer (A. Morpurgo Davies & W. Meid, eds.), 181–197. Innsbruck: Innsbruck Institut für Sprachwissenschaft.
- 1978 a: ‘Thessalian εἴντεσσι and the participle of the verb 'to be'’. In Etrennes de Septantaine. Travaux offerts à M. Lejeune, 157–66. Paris: Klincksieck.
- 1987 b: ‘Folk-linguistics and the Greek word’. In Festschrift H. M. Hoenigswald (G. Cardona & N. Zide, eds.), 263-80 Tübingen: Narr.
- 1993 a: ‘Geography, history and dialect: the case of Oropos’. In Dialectologica Graeca. Actas del II Coloquio Internacional de Dialectologia Griega (E. Crespo, J.L. García Ramón & A. Striano, eds.), 261–79. Madrid: Universidad Autónoma de Madrid.
- 1997: ‘Particles in Greek epigraphical texts: the case of Arcadian’. In New Approaches to Greek Particles. Proceedings of the Colloquium held in Amsterdam, Jan. 4–6, 1996, to honour C. J. Ruijgh on the occasion of his retirement (A. Rijksbaron, ed.), 49–73. Amsterdam: Gieben.
- 1999 a [but 2000]: ‘Contatti interdialettali: il formulario epigrafico’. In KATA DIALEKTON. Atti del III Colloquio Internazionale di Dialettologia Greca (A.C. Cassio, ed.) = A.I.O.N. 19 (1997), 7-33. Napoli: Istituto Universitario Orientale.
- 2000: ‘Greek personal names and linguistic continuity’. In Greek Personal Names: Their Value as Evidence (S. Hornblower & E. Matthews, eds.), 15–39. Oxford: Oxford University Press.
- 2001: ‘Après Michel Lejeune: L’anthroponymie et l’histoire de la langue grecque’. In Comptes-rendus de l’Académie des inscriptions et belles-lettres, no. 1, 157–73. Paris.
- 2006 b: ‘Onomastics, diffusion and word formation: Greek Άριστογείτων and Άριστόγειτος’. In Studi Linguistici in onore di Roberto Gusmani (R. Bombi et al., eds.), 1241–56. Alessandria: Edizioni dell’Orso.
- 2012 d: ‘Phonetic laws, language diffusion, and drift: the loss of sibilants in the Greek dialects of the first millennium BC’. In Laws and Rules in Indo-European (P. Probert & A. Willi, eds.), 102–21. Oxford: Oxford University Press.

==== Anatolian languages ====
- 1975 a: ‘Negation and disjunction in Anatolian and elsewhere’. Anatolian Studies 25, 157–68.
- 1978 d: (& J. D. Hawkins) a. ‘Il sistema grafico del luvio geroglifico’. In Annali della Scuola Normale di Pisa, 755–82.
- 1978 e: (& J. D. Hawkins) b. ‘On the problems of Karatepe: the Hieroglyphic text’. Anatolian Studies 28, 103–19.
- 1979 d: ‘The Luwian languages and the Hittite hi-conjugation’. In Festschrift Oswald Szemerényi (B. Brogyanyi, ed.), 577–610. Amsterdam: Benjamins.
- 1979 e: (& J. D. Hawkins). ‘The hieroglyphic inscription of Bohca’. In Studia mediterranea Piero Meriggi dicata (O. Carruba, ed.), 387–406. Pavia: Centro Ricerche Egeo-Anatoliche, Aurora Edizioni.
- 1980 a: ‘The personal endings of the Hieroglyphic Luwian verb’. Zeitschrift für vergleichende Sprachforschung[KZ] 94, 86–108.
- 1980 b: ‘Analogy and the an-datives of Hieroglyphic Luwian’. Anatolian Studies 30, 123–37.
- 1982: (& J. D. Hawkins). ‘Buying and selling in Hieroglyphic Luwian’. In Serta Indogermanica. Festschrift G. Neumann (J. Tischler, ed.), 91–105. Innsbruck: Innsbruck Institut für Sprachwissenschaft.
- 1982/3: ‘Dentals, rhotacism and Verbal endings in the Luwian languages’. Zeitschriftfürvergleichende Sprachforschung [KZ] 96: 245–70.
- 1986 d: ‘Fighting, ploughing and the Karkamiš kings’. In o-o-pe-ro-si. Festschrift Ernst Risch (A. Etter, ed.), 129–45. Berlin: de Gruyter.
- 1986 e: (& J. D. Hawkins). ‘Studies in Hieroglyphic Luwian’. In Kanišuwar. A tribute to Hans G. Güterbock (H. A. Hoffner & G. Beckman, eds.), 69–81. Chicago: Oriental Institute.
- 1987 a: (& J. D. Hawkins). ‘The late Hieroglyphic Luwian corpus: some new lexical recognitions’. Hethitica 8, 267–95.
- 1993 b: (& J. D. Hawkins). ‘Running and relatives in Luwian’. Kadmos 32, 50–60.
- 1998 a: (& J. D. Hawkins). ‘Of donkeys, mules and Tarkondemos’. In Mír curad. Studies in honor of Calvert Watkins (J. Jasanoff, H. C. Melchert & L. Oliver, eds.), 243–60. Innsbruck: Innsbruck Institut für Sprachwissenschaft.
- 1998 b: ‘Sessanta anni (o cento) di linguistica anatolica’. In Il Geroglifico Anatolico. Atti del Colloquio e della tavola rotonda Napoli-Procida, 5–9 giugno 1995 (M. Marazzi, ed.), 219–57. Napoli: Istituto Universitario Orientale.
- 2010: (& J. D. Hawkins). ‘More negatives and disjunctives in Hieroglyphic Luwian’. In Ex Anatolia Lux. Anatolian and Indo-European Studies in honor of H. Craig Melchert (R. Kim et al., eds.), 98–128. Ann Arbor – New York: Beech Stave Press.
- 2011: ‘Philology and Linguistics: when data meet theory. Two case studies: I. The case of Hieroglyphic Luwian’. Transactions of the Philological Society 109, 207–12.

==== History of linguistics ====
- 1975 b: ‘Language classification in the nineteenth century’. In Current Trends in Linguistics, vol. 13 (T. Sebeok, ed.), 607–716. The Hague: Mouton.
- 1975 c: (& J. D. Hawkins). ‘Hieroglyphic Hittite: Some new readings and their consequences’. Journal of the Royal Asiatic Society [JRAS] 1975 (2), 121–33.
- 1978 b: ‘Analogy, segmentation and the early Neogrammarians’. Transactions of the Philological Society, 36–60.
- 1994 a: ‘Early and late Indo-European from Bopp to Brugmann’. In Früh-, Mittel-, Spätindogermanisch, Akten der IX Fachtagung der Indogermanischen Gesellschaft (G.E. Dunkel, G. Meyer, S. Scarlata, C. Seidl, eds.), 245-65: Wiesbaden: Reichert.
- 1994 b: ‘La linguistica dell'Ottocento’. In Storia della Linguistica, vol. 3, (G. Lepschy, ed.), 11-400. Bologna: Il Mulino (translation from English by F. Nassi).
- 1986 b: ‘Karl Brugmann and late nineteenth-century linguistics’. In Studies in the History of Western Linguistics in Honour of R.H. Robins (Th. Bynon & F.R. Palmer, eds.), 150–71. Cambridge: Cambridge University Press.
- 1987 c: ‘'Organic' and 'organism' in Franz Bopp’. In Biological Metaphor and Cladistic Classification -6-
- 2004: ‘Saussure and Indo-European linguistics’. In The Cambridge Companion to Saussure (C. Sanders, ed.), 9-29. Cambridge: Cambridge University Press.
- 2009 a: ‘Razza e razzismo: continuità ed equivoci nella linguistica dell’Ottocento’. In Lingue, ethnos e popolazioni: evidenze linguistiche, biologiche e culturali. Atti del convegno di Verona della Società Italiana di Glottologia (P. Cotticelli Kurras, G. Graffi, eds.), 55–82. Roma: Il Calamo.
- 2009 b: ‘Dynamic, organic, mechanical: the general significance of the debate about Indo-European Ablaut in the early nineteenth century. In La grammatica tra storia e teoria. Scritti in onore di Giorgio Graffi (P. Cotticelli Kurras & A. Tomaselli, eds.), 133–52. Alessandria: Edizioni dell’Orso.
