= Karahöyük =

Karahöyük may refer to the following settlements in Turkey:

- Karahöyük, Adıyaman, a village in Adıyaman Province
- Karahöyük, İncesu, a village in Kayseri Province
- Karahöyük, Kalecik, a neighbourhood in Ankara Province
- Karahöyük, Şehitkamil, a village in Gaziantep Province
- Karahüyük, Acıpayam, a neighbourhood in the Denizli Province

== Archaeology ==
- Türkmen-Karahöyük, an archaeological site in Konya Province, Turkey
- Konya-Karahöyük, also known as Karahöyük 1, is a large archaeological mound in Turkey. Located near the city of Konya in Konya Province
- Eregli Kara Höyük, near the modern town of Ereğli, Konya in Konya Province, Turkey - the likely location of ancient Cybistra
- Karahoyuk (Elbistan), an archaeological site in Kahramanmaraş Province, Turkey
