= Dedemli =

Town in Konya Province, Turkey

- Neighbourhood
- Location in Turkey Dedemli (Turkey Central Anatolia)
- Coordinates: 37°01′N 32°20′E (old town)
- Country: Turkey
- Province: Konya
- District: Hadim (until 2026); Meram (since 2026)
- Elevation: 1,350 m (4,430 ft)
- Population (2022): 848
- Time zone: UTC+3 (TRT)
- Postal code: 42830
- Area code: 0332

Dedemli is a neighbourhood of the municipality and district of Meram, Konya Province, Turkey. Its population is 848 (2022). Before the 2013 reorganisation, it was a town (belde).

== Geography ==
Dedemli is on Toros Mountains, at an altitude of 1,350 m (4,430 ft). It is situated just at the west of headwaters of Göksu River and a few kilometers north of Korualan, another mountain town. Dedemli is quite far from the main highways. The distances to Hadim is 20 km (12 mi) and to Konya is 146 km (91 mi).

== History ==
According to legend, the town had been founded by a sheikh (Islamic scholar) named Bayram Seydi Veli from Khorosan in the 15th century. In fact the name of the town means with my grandfather where grandfather in this context, means sheikh. In 1968, the town was declared township.

In 2026, the town was relocated to south of Konya, due to being in the way of Bozkır Dam. On 30 March 2026, administration were handed over from Hadim to Meram district.

== Economy ==
Once known for its religious schools, Dedemli is now a typical agricultural town. The most important crop is cherry. Beekeeping is another important sector.
