= Astragalus yukselii =

Scientific classification
- Kingdom: Plantae
- Clade: Embryophytes
- Clade: Tracheophytes
- Clade: Angiosperms
- Clade: Eudicots
- Clade: Rosids
- Order: Fabales
- Family: Fabaceae
- Subfamily: Faboideae
- Genus: Astragalus
- Species: A. yukselii

Binomial name
- Astragalus yukselii Karaman & Aytaç

Species of flowering plant

Astragalus yukselii is a species of flowering plant in the family Fabaceae. It is a shrublet with pink or purple flowers, and ovate to oblong-elliptical fruits. The species is native to Turkey, and was described in 2013.

== Taxonomy ==
The species was described by Seher Karaman Erkul and Zeki Aytaç in 2013.

Astragalus yukselii is closely related to Astragalus isauricus and Astragalus karjaginii. These species belong to the section Macrophyllium.

== Distribution ==
Astragalus yukselii is native to the temperate biome of Turkey. It is found near Hadim, Konya Province, Turkey. The species grows on roadsides and steppes, at elevations of 1,500–1,600 metres (4,900–5,200 ft).

== Description ==
Astragalus yukselii is a 25–40 centimetres (9.8–15.7 in) tall shrublet.

The leaves are 7–27 centimetres (2.8–10.6 in) long, and have 0.4–1 millimetre (0.016–0.039 in) long hairs. The leaf stems are 3–6 centimetres (1.2–2.4 in) long. The plant has seven to fourteen pairs of yellowish to light green leaflets. The leaflets are narrowly oblong, 4–26 millimetres (0.16–1.02 in) long, and 1–6 millimetres (0.039–0.236 in) wide.

The inflorescence is dense, ovoid to cylindrical, 5–12 centimetres (2.0–4.7 in) long, and 4–5 centimetres (1.6–2.0 in) wide. The inflorescence is composed of four to ten clusters. The flowers lack stems. The calyx is green, 20–22 millimetres (0.79–0.87 in) long, and has green or purple teeth. The corolla is pink to purple. The standard is 24–27 millimetres (0.94–1.06 in) long. The keel is 18–20 millimetres (0.71–0.79 in) long.

The fruits are ovate to oblong-elliptical, 10–12 millimetres (0.39–0.47 in) long, around 3 millimetres (0.12 in) high, and 5–6 millimetres (0.20–0.24 in) wide. The seeds are elliptical to kidney-shaped, brown (sometimes with black spots), 3–3.5 millimetres (0.12–0.14 in) long, and 2 millimetres (0.079 in) wide.

== Etymology ==
Astragalus yukselii is named for a plant collecter, and the father of one of the describing authors.
