= Tarḫuntašša =

Former Hittite country

Tarḫuntašša (Hittite: 𒀭𒅎𒋫𒀸𒊭 and Hieroglyphic Luwian: 𔖖𔓢𔕙𔑯𔗦: lit. 'City of Tarhunt') was a Bronze Age city in south-central Anatolia (modern-day Turkey) mentioned in contemporary documents. Its location is unknown. The city was the capital of the Hittite Empire for a time and later became a regional power in its own right. The kingdom controlled by the city is known by the same name and its approximate borders are known from texts.

== Location ==
In 2019, a previously little-researched site at Türkmen-Karahöyük, near Çumra on the Konya Plain, was investigated and put forward as the site of Tarḫuntassa by Michele Massa, James Osborne and Christoph Bachhuber. Previously proposed locations include Konya, Sirkeli Höyük in Cilicia, the vicinity of Kayseri, and Kilise Tepe (formerly known as Maltepe). Kızıldağ has been suggested based on the idea that Hartapus was possibly a ruler of Tarḫuntassa. Another proposed location is at the site of Meydancık Castle and that Tarḫuntassa was another name for Hulaya River Land.

== History ==
=== New Hittite capital ===
In the early 13th century BC, Muwatalli II moved the Hittite capital from Hattusa to Tarhuntassa. The reasons for this move remain unclear. Official records postdating Muwatalli II's death state that he moved the capital as the result of an omen. Generally, archaeologists explain the move as a military strategy, in order to be closer to the Syrian region in preparation for battle with Ramses II at Kadesh. However, Itamar Singer has proposed instead that Muwatalli II moved the capital as part of a religious reform, attempting to elevate his personal god Pihassassi, the storm-god of lightning, to a more powerful position in Hittite religious observance. A third explanation is that at this point in time, Tarhuntassa was more centrally located within the network of overland and sea routes connecting the Hittite empire and beyond, making it an ideal capital for managing trade and communication throughout the territory.

Muwatalli II's son Mursili III later moved the capital back to Hattusa. After Hattusili III deposed Mursili, the new king appointed Muwatalli's son Kurunta as king in Tarhuntassa. The treaty mostly refers to the appointed king as Ulmi-Tessup; consequently, some scholars believe that Ulmi-Tessup and Kurunta are two different rulers of Tarhuntassa.

=== Kurunta of Tarhuntassa ===
Tudhaliya IV re-ratified Kurunta as king in a treaty inscribed in bronze. At this time, Kurunta was leading his forces to war with Parha. This treaty, unlike previous treaties involving Tarhuntassa, calls to witness the Hittites' vassal kings of Mira and the Seha River Land on the Aegean coast. This implies that Tarhuntassa's stature was now a matter of importance for all western Anatolia.

Kurunta later claimed the title of Great King for himself. Whether or not this claim extended to the whole domain of Hatti, the court in Hattusa contested it (and buried the treaty).

=== Fall of the Hittite Empire ===
Toward the end of the Hittite empire, Suppiluliuma II recorded in a Hieroglyphic Luwian inscription that Hatti had attacked and sacked the city of Tarhuntassa.

== Türkmen-Karahöyük ==
Though occupied beginning in the Late Chalcolithic period this site was most heavily occupied in the Late Bronze Age (c. 1300-1100 BC) and Middle Iron Age (c. 900-600 BC). At those times it reached an extent of over 120 hectares making it largest site in west and central Anatolia. During a 2019 regional archaeological survey, called the Konya Regional Archaeological Survey Project, Oriental Institute of Chicago archaeologists unearthed a monumental Luwian Hieroglyphs inscription in an irrigation ditch. Investigation showed that the stone had originally been at the top of the mound but had been moved during illegal excavations. The inscription detailed a ruler named Harapu's victory over Muska, which the epigraphers propose is Phrygia but which is still unresolved.

"LINE 1 - Great King Kartapu, Hero, Mursili’s son. LINE 2 - When he (i.e. Kartapu) conquered the country of Muska, the enemy came down (into) the land. The Storm-god of heaven (and) all the gods placed 13 (enemy) kings (into) the hand (of) His Majesty, Great King Hartapu. (And) he (i.e. Hartapu) took (these) 13 kings down, (with their) shields/protection and cattle (at their/and) 10 mighty-fortresses (with their) great orthostats/stones/walls (within) a year. LINE 3 - And Azari-Tiwata (or less likely Ap(a)ri-Tiwata), the scribe, car[ved (this)]."

Because an already known inscription referred to a Hartapu son of Mursili which some suggested was Mursili III a known king of Tarḫuntašša some researchers speculated Türkmen-Karahöyük was Tarḫuntašša. The excavators determined that the inscription dated to the 8th century BC, much too recent to be related to Tarḫuntašša and continue to stand by that view though not precluding the site being Tarḫuntašša in Middle Bronze times. At the site of Kızıldağ, about 13 kilometers to the south-southeast, there is another inscription (one of 4 similar inscriptions found there) of a Hartapu on an outcrop.

At this time the collation, the translation, and the chronology of both the Kızıldağ inscriptions and the Türkmen-Karahöyük inscription (as well as similar inscriptions at BURUNKAYA and Topada) are still unsettled. Dating for the various related inscriptions, including the ones naming Hartapu, has been determined to be either 12th century BC or 8th century BC. In the case of the Türkmen-Karahöyük inscription it is thought that not all three lines were inscribed at the same time. The scientific consensus is that there was an earlier Hartapu and a later one.

== See also ==
- Cities of the ancient Near East
- Ura, Anatolia
