= Artanada =

Ancient town of Cilicia

Coordinates: 37°01′05″N 32°43′06″E

Artanada was an inland town of ancient Cilicia and later of Isauria, inhabited during the Roman era.

Its site is located near Dülgerler in Hadim, Konya Province, Turkey.
