= Konya-Karaman Plain =

Region in central Turkey

Konya Plain, Turkey

The Konya-Karaman Plain or Konya and Karaman Plains is an arid steppe in the Central Anatolia Region of Turkey. It occupies a plateau with an elevation of 900–1050 m. The Konya-Karaman Plain is of considerable archaeological interest due to its multitude of important sites dated to the Neolithic, Chalcolithic, and Bronze Age periods.

== Geography ==
The Konya-Karaman Plain constitutes the main part of the Central Anatolian plateau. The Çarşamba River originates in the Aygibi waterfalls at around 1600m and flows north to Sorkun and east to Apasaraycık. It is dammed at Apa.

The plain contained a 4200 km^{2} large lake up to the Last Glacial Maximum. The limestone bedrock is subject to karstic processes, mainly sinkhole formations called obruk in Turkish.

== Climate ==
The Konya-Karaman Plain is one of the driest areas in Turkey, with diminishing precipitation as a result climate change. Sinkholes formed since the 1990s resulting in groundwater depletion.

About 20% of Turkey's agricultural land is within Konya-Karaman Plain, while it contains only about 7% of the country's water.

== Konya Plain Project ==
To alleviate the drought, the Konya Plain Project was launched in 2012. The major water resource management project includes irrigation, potable water, and hydroelectric components including the Blue Tunnel Project and the Bagbasi Dam.

== History ==
Evidence of human presence in the Konya-Karaman Plain goes back to at least the Neolithic. Early populations would have found it resource-poor, lacking the timber, metal, chipped stone, and ground stone which Neolithic communities depended upon. These populations developed procurement networks in as early as the 9th millennium BC; these networks continued to exist into the Bronze and Iron Ages.

The earliest appearance of irrigation in the region dates to the 3rd millennium BC; this allowed settlement to expand from the alluvium onto the arid Central Anatolian steppe. By the 2nd and 1st millennia BC, local populations had by necessity begun to develop more sophisticated water management practices.

=== Hittite Empire ===
The Çarşamba River was called the Ḫūlaya (Hittite: 𒀀𒇉𒄷𒌋𒆷𒅀) in Hittite; the surrounding plain was called the Ḫūlaya River Land (Hittite: 𒆳𒌷𒀀𒇉𒄷𒌋𒆷𒅀).

== Archaeology ==
The Konya-Karaman Plain is of considerable ongoing archaeological interest. The important Neolithic site of Çatalhöyük is located here.

The tell of Konya-Karahöyük is another major archaeological site in the Konya-Karaman Plain. The tell, or mound, was occupied in successive phases from the Middle to Late Bronze Age, with possible habitation beginning still earlier.

A large site near the Bronze Age settlement of Türkmen-Karahöyük shows occupation from the Late Bronze into the Iron Age. There is evidence of relations with the Hittite capital Tarḫuntašša prior to the Late Bronze Age collapse (c. 1200 BC). Artifacts of later periods include a document written in Anatolian hieroglyphs which proclaims the victory of the 8th century BC Neo-Hittite king Ḫartapus over Phrygia.
