= Kilise Tepe =

Archaeological site in Mut, Mersin, Turkey

- Location within Turkey
- 36.483333°N 33.55°E
- Type: Settlement
- Periods: Bronze Age, Iron Age, Hellenistic, Roman, Byzantine
- Cultures: Hittite
- Location: Mersin Province, Turkey

Site notes
- Excavation dates: 1994-1997 2007-2011
- Archaeologists: Nicholas Postgate, Mark Jackson,
- Condition: In ruins

Kilise Tepe is a mound in Mersin Province, Turkey, just west of the Göksu River, lying 20 kilometers from Mut and 145 kilometers from Mersin. It was initially known as Maltepe which is actually the name of a site on the other bank of the river about four kilometers to the west. The original name of the mound is not known and Kilise Tepe in Turkish means "church-hill" referring to a church ruin. The site is thought to have been part of the land of Tarḫuntašša, formed when Muwatalli II moved the Hittite capital.

== History ==
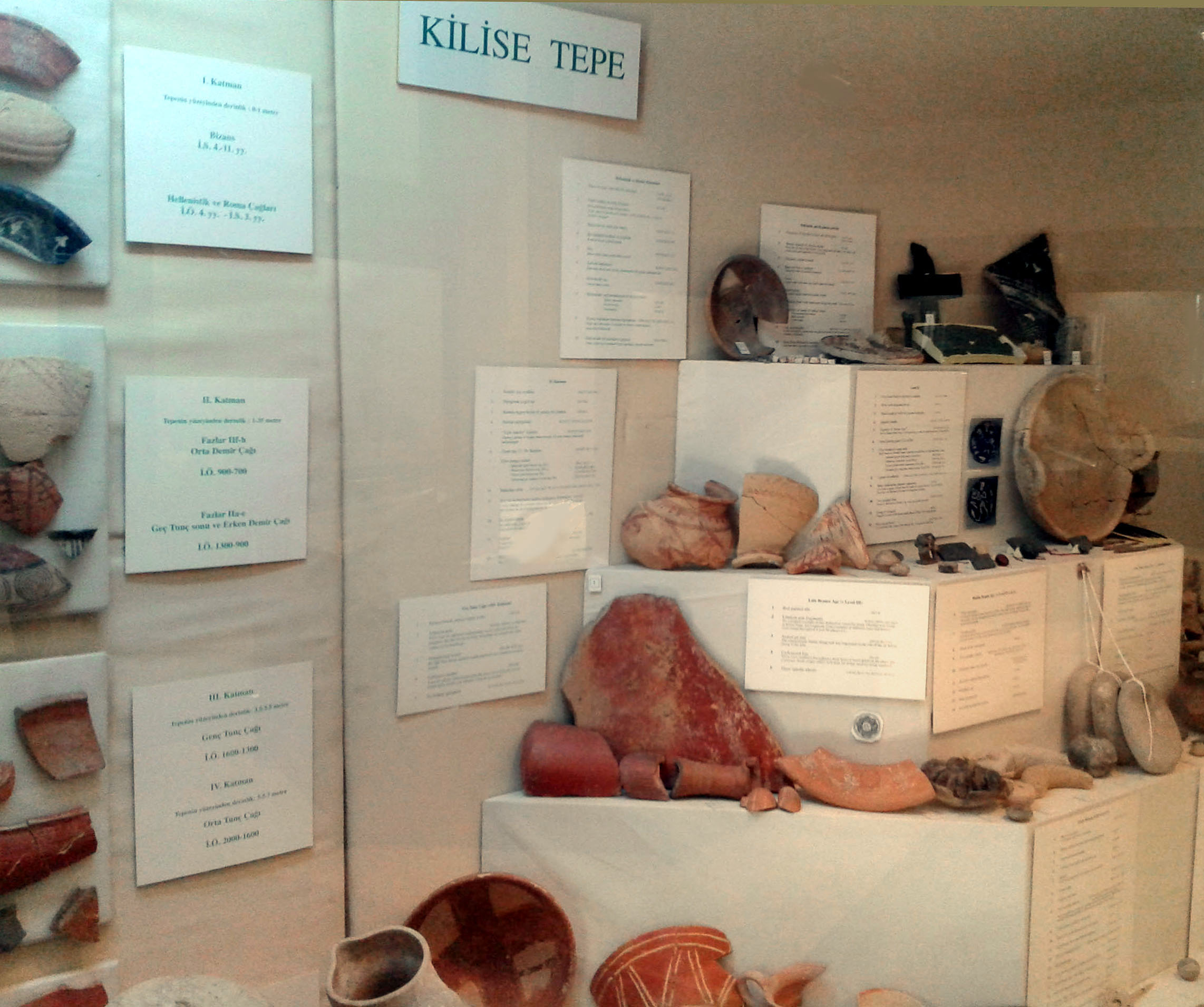
Kilise Tepe findings in Silifke Museum

The earliest settlement is dated to third Millennium BC during the Early Bronze Age. During the Hittite Empire era, it was used to control the road between the Hittite lands in Central Anatolia and the Mediterranean ports. At the end of the 13th Century BC, the settlement was burnt down by Sea peoples, like much of Anatolia at the time. In its wake, a reconstruction began, but this too was destroyed in the middle of the 12th Century BC. Mycenaean LHIIIC pottery from Cyprus and Crete was found in this layer, dating from 1200 to 1150 BC. During a two century break between the Iron Age and Hellenistic Period the site was unoccupied. Settlement resumed during the Hellenistic period, but there is no indication of a settlement during the Roman period. The ruined Byzantine church (single chamber with cemetery) is a circa 11th century replacement for a destroyed earlier 5th century Cilician three-aisled basilica (with side chambers and a passage to the east of the apse).

== Excavations ==
The site was first report in 1958 by J. Mellaart who noted large amounts of pottery from the 3rd, 2nd, and 1st Millenniums BC. It lies on a 200-meter north to south promontory and is 100 meters by 120 meters in extent with a height from 10 to 12 meters with the northern portion somewhat higher.

In response to dam construction, excavations began in 1994 as a joint effort between Cambridge University and Newcastle University and continued until 1997. The work began with a fiull mapping survey in 1994. In the Late Bronze layer (Level III) some timbers were recovered which gave a dendrochronology date of 1380 BC. Level II produced 4 lentoid stamp seals typical of 13th century BC Hittite Empire. One is of an official reading, in hieroglyphs, "Tarhunta-piya, the charioteer". After a pause the excavations resumed in 2007 focusing on Late Bronze Age and later levels. The Cambridge team is headed by Nicholas Postgate and is responsible for the Iron Age excavations. The Newcastle team is headed by Mark Jackson and is responsible for the Byzantine excavations. This work continued until 2011. The Turkish collaborators were Çanakkale Onsekiz Mart University in the 2010–2011 term and Bitlis Eren University in later terms. The findings are exhibited in Silifke Museum.

== See also ==
- Cities of the ancient Near East
