= Atayurt =

Settlement in Turkey

- Neighbourhood
- Location in Turkey
- Coordinates: 36°23′N 34°02′E
- Country: Turkey
- Province: Mersin
- District: Silifke
- Elevation: 5 m (16 ft)
- Population (2022): 6,876
- Time zone: UTC+3 (TRT)
- Postal code: 33980
- Area code: 0324

Atayurt is a neighbourhood in the municipality and district of Silifke, Mersin Province, Turkey. Its population is 6,876 (2022). Before the 2013 reorganisation, it was a town (belde).

== Geography ==
Atayurt is in the fertile alluvial plain of Silifke district. The town is on the D 400 highway. The distance to Mersin is 72 km (45 mi) and to Silifke is 10 km (6.2 mi).

== History ==
The rural population density of the vicinity has always been high and there were two villages (Olukbaşı and Esenbel) next to each other. In 1989, the two villages have been merged to form Atayurt town. In 2005, Karadedeli and Sıtmasuyu villages have been merged. The name of the town refers to Atatürk, the founder of the Turkish republic.

== Economy ==
Like other parts of Silifke plain, the main economic activity of Atayurt is agriculture, especially green house and forced crop agriculture. Almost all fruits especially strawberries are produced. Since the sea side is only 5 km (3.1 mi) to town center, the services to summer houses at the sea side also play a part of town economy.

== Concerns about blue tunnel project ==
The Göksu River is very important to the economy of the town. The government is planning to use a part of the river to water Central Anatolia with the Blue Tunnel Project (Turkish: Mavi Tünel) referring to a 17 km (11 mi) tunnel with a capacity of 36 m^{3}/s which will drain water to Eğiste in Konya Province. Atayurt residents are afraid that this project may cause a partial drought around Atayurt and decrease agricultural production.
