= Konya Archaeological Museum =

Museum in Konya, Turkey

Coordinates: 37.8678°N 32.4937°E

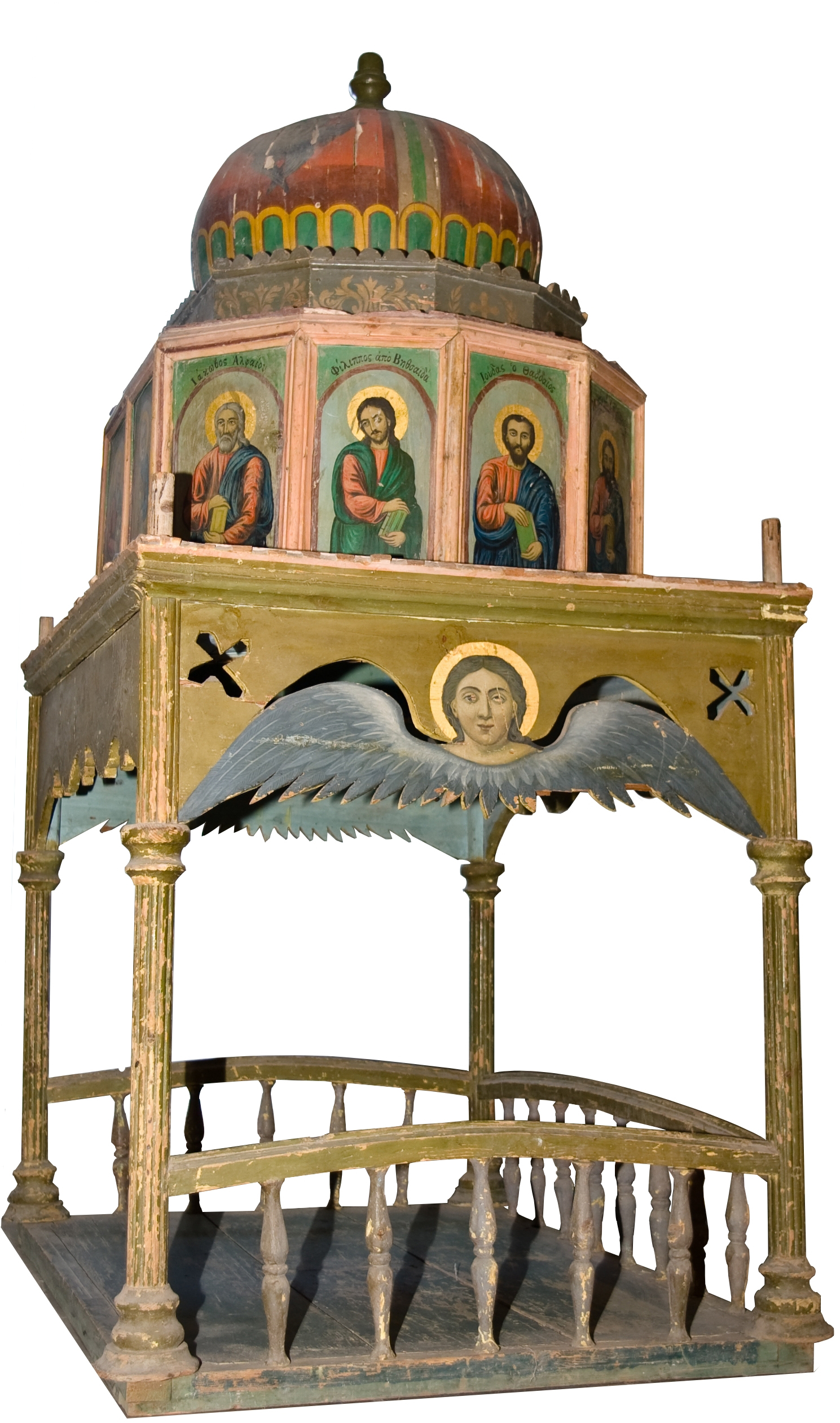
Byzantine artifact in Konya Archaeological Museum

Konya Archaeological Museum is a state archaeological museum in Konya, Turkey. Established in 1901, it had been relocated twice before moving to its present location in 1962. One of the most prominent displays in the museum is of sarcophagi and other antiquities from the ancient city of Çatalhöyük. Other exhibits relate to the Neolithic, Bronze Age (old-Bronze and mid-Bronze periods), Iron Age (Phrygian and Urartu), Classical, Hellenistic, Roman and the Byzantine periods; artifacts consist of ceramic ware, stone and bronze wares, ornaments and inscriptions. Among the objects displayed is a marble sarcophagus of the 3rd century AD, with elaborate relief sculptures depicting the life of Hercules. In the outer open yard of the museum there are a number of small sculptures, sarcophagi, column capitals, and samples of epigraphy.

== History ==
The museum was established in 1901 in one corner of the Karma Secondary School. It was shifted in 1927 to the Mevlana Museum and to the İplikçi Mosque in 1953. The museum reopened in a new building at the present location in 1962. It is situated in the interior of Konya city, approached by narrow lanes, and is on the Sahip Ata Caddesi. Konya Archaeological Museum is one of the eight museums owned by the state in Konya.

== Halls ==
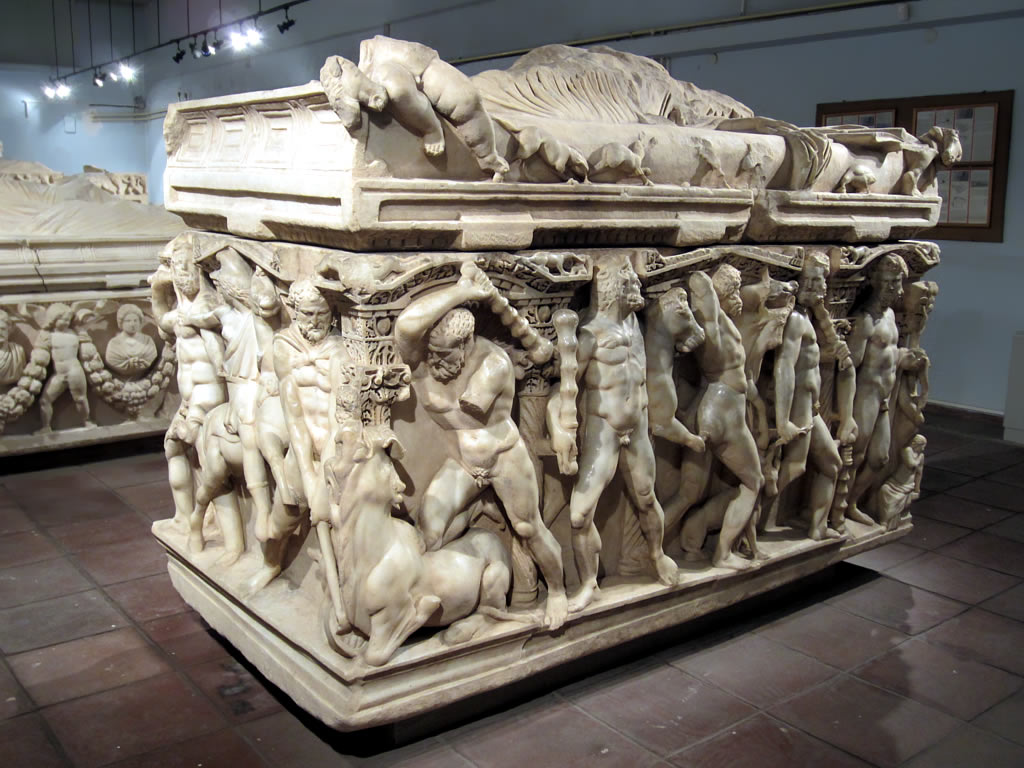
A Roman sarcophagus from 250-260 AD depicting the labors of Hercules

The building houses a number of exhibition halls:

The Pre-Historic Hall with antiquities of the Neolithic period (3000-1950 BC) from the excavations at Çatalhöyük consisting of terracotta pottery and stone implements; artifacts of the Old Bronze Period (1950-1750 BC), mostly ribbed terracotta pottery, from the archaeological excavations at Virgin, Türkmen-Karahöyük and Beyşehir; Middle Bronze Age (1950-1750 BC) artifacts of terracotta wares and bronze rings from Konya Karahöyük.

The Iron Age Hall has exhibits of painted and other types of pottery in various shapes from the Iron Age (8th to 6th century BC) from Konya Alaaddin Hill, Phrygia, and Kıcıkışla, and figurines from Urartu; Classical Period antiquities which are finds from excavations at Kıcıkışla and Lekythoses in the form of Kylixes, and a oinokhoe decorated and painted black; the Hellenistic Period exhibits are dated to 330-30 BC and consist of pottery of different varieties; and Roman Period small bronze artifacts of Hermes, Eros and a bull.

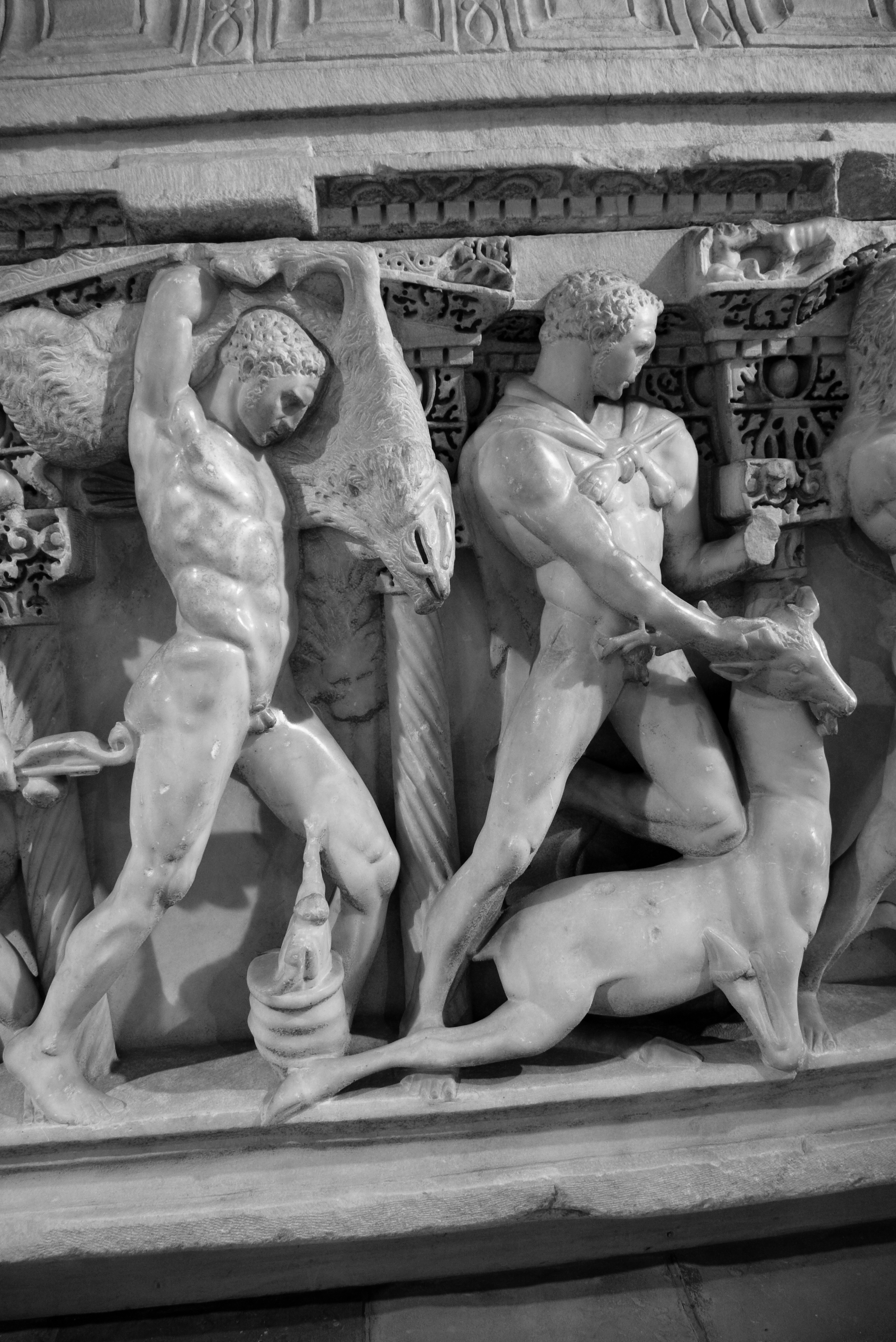
Hercules' sarcophagus

The Roman Period Hall has displays of antiquities from 30 BC to 395 AD from Iconium of "Sidemara type marble Herakles Sarcophagus with columns (250-260 AD)", pottery, glassware, ivory and ornaments; Byzantine Period (395-1453 AD) artifacts of "base mosaics" from Tatköy Church in Sille, Tatköy, Çumra, Alibeyhöyük, and Kilise, and also "bronze door knockers, cauldron handles, rolickers, crosses, marks and arrow ends" of the period. The prominent exhibits here are the 3rd century marble sarcophagus with carved scenes from the life of Hercules, a sarcophagus made in clay of the Roman period, a marble sarcophagus with engraved festoons, a 2nd-century sculpture of Poseidon, and religious stone slab of the goddess Cybele (the Anatolian mother goddess).

== Collections ==
The museum has inscriptions collected from locations within the city, and nearby areas; these consist of 231 inscriptions in Greek of which 91 are from Konya and the rest are from other places in the vicinity. In addition, there 10 inscriptions in Latin.

Another notable collection on display consists of six commercial amphorae made to store wine, garum and olive oil for maritime trading. These were specially manufactured in various subgroups in shapes with pointed bottoms so that the maximum number of them could be fitted into vacant spaces on the ship to maintain a stable form during a voyage.

== Grounds ==
In addition to exhibits within the museum, the grounds contain small sculptures, sarcophagi, column heads, and epigraphy. Exhibits are also maintained at the entrance porch and in the front garden. The porch has exhibits of the Byzantine Period in the form of stone and marble antiquities of grave stones from Sille and Konya; and cemetery slabs of the Roman Period. Two important sculptures exhibited in the open yard of the museum are a limestone block with an inscription of Derbe ascribed to the period of Paul the Apostle, and two stone monuments with inscriptions; one is a limestone block with the name of the city of Derbe and the other is an altar piece with the name Lystra inscribed on it.

== Bibliography ==
- Dural, Sadrettin; Hodder, Ian (2007). Protecting Çatalhöyük: Memoir of an Archaeological Site Guard. Left Coast Press. ISBN 978-1-59874-050-9.
- Fant, Clyde E.; Reddish, Mitchell G. (4 September 2003). A Guide to Biblical Sites in Greece and Turkey. Oxford University Press, USA. ISBN 978-0-19-988145-1.
- Hope-Simpson, Dermot (31 July 2014). Travels in My Eighties. Author House. ISBN 978-1-4969-8332-9.
