= Eğiste =

Village in Konya Province, Turkey

Eğiste Bağbaşı
- Neighbourhood
- Location in Turkey Eğiste (Turkey Central Anatolia)
- Coordinates: 37°06′N 32°27′E
- Country: Turkey
- Province: Konya
- District: Hadim
- Elevation: 1,320 m (4,330 ft)
- Population (2022): 686
- Time zone: UTC+3 (TRT)
- Area code: 0332

Eğiste (formerly: Bağbaşı) is a neighbourhood of the municipality and district of Hadim, Konya Province, Turkey. Its population is 686 (2022). Before the 2013 reorganisation, it was a town (belde).

It is situated in Toros Mountains, just at the south of a pass named after Eğiste. It is planned to be the northern terminus of the 17 kilometres (11 mi) Blue Tunnel Project (Turkish: Mavi tünel) where the southern terminal will be Atayurt in Mersin Province. After realising the project water from Göksu River will be fed to Konya villages.
