= Sedat Alp =

Turkish archaeologist, historian (1913-2006)

- Born: January 1, 1913; Veroia
- Died: October 9, 2006 (aged 93); Ankara
- Citizenship: Turkey
- Occupations: archaeologist, historian

Academic background
- Education: University of Leipzig

Prof. Ord. Sedat Alp (January 1, 1913 in Veroia – October 9, 2006 in Ankara) was the first Turkish archaeologist, historian and academic with a specialization in Hittitology, and was among the foremost names in the field. He was the president of the Turkish Historical Association from 1982 to 1983.

== Biography ==
Sedat Alp was born in Veroia, Greece. His family moved to Turkey as a result of the exchange of populations between Greece and Turkey in 1923. In 1932, he earned a state scholarship opened under the personal auspices of Mustafa Kemal Atatürk and was sent to the University of Leipzig (he later transferred to the University of Berlin) to study prehistory, history, Hittitology, Sumerology, Assyriology, ancient Anatolian languages and cultures, as well as archaeology in general. Having earned his doctorate in the University of Berlin, he returned to Turkey in 1940 and started to teach Hittitology within Ankara University's Faculty of Languages, History and Geography (DTCF). He became the dean of the faculty in 1959, continuing at the same time his work in the field. One of his most notable discoveries was the mound of Maşat Höyük, which in the quantities of Hittite cuneiform tablets was second only to the Hittite capital at Hattusas modern Boğazkale, near Çorum.

Outside Turkey, Prof. Alp was awarded the Italian Commandatore of the Order of Merit of the Republic in 1957, the Order of Merit of the Presidency of the Federal Republic of Germany in 1972, the French College of France medal in 1980, the German Great Cross of Merit with star and the Grande Ufficiale Order of Merit of the Italian Presidency of the Republic in 1991. From 1997 he held an honorary doctorate at the University of Würzburg, and from the following year was made a member of the British Academy and, for the contributions he made to the promotion of knowledge on the region's historical treasures, an honorary citizen of the city of Çorum in north-central Anatolia, where the Hittite capital was situated. He died in Ankara.

== Awards ==
- 1957 - Order of Merit Commendatore of the Italian Republic
- 1972 - Order of Merit of the Federal Republic of Germany
- 1980 - Paris College de France Medal
- 1991 - Order of Merit of the Federal Republic of Germany
- 1991 - Order of Merit Grande Ufficiale of the Italian Republic
- 1992 - Turkish Promotional Foundation Award
- 2001 - Ankara University Language and History-Geography Faculty Honor Award
- 2001 - Middle East Technical University Archeological Society Honor Award
- 2002 - Ankara University Language and History-Geography Faculty Honor Award
- 2003 - Aydın Doğan Foundation Archeology Award

== Published works ==
- Untersuchungen zu den Beamtennamen im Hethitischen Festzeremoniell, Leipzig, 1940.
- The Hittite Hieroglyphic Inscription of Şırzı, Ankara University, DTCF Dergisi, 1947, p. 153-158. (with Prof. Hans Gustav Güterbock)
- Military Instructions of the Hittite King Tuthaliya IV(?). Belleten XI, nr. 43, 1947 p. 403-414.
- La désignation du Lituus eiı Hittite, Journal of Cuneiform Studies, I, 1947, p. 164-175.
- GIS kalmuš "Lituus" and HUB.BI "Earring" in the Hittite Texts, Belleten XII, nr. 46, 1948, p. 320-324.
- Die Soziale Klasse der NAM.RA-Leute und ihre hethitische Bezeichnung, Jahrbuch für Kleinasiatische Forschung I, 1950–51, p. 113-135.
- Bemerkungen zu den Hieroglyphen des Hethitischen Monuments von İmamkulu, Symbolae Hrozny I, Archiv Orientální XVIII, 1950, p. 1-8.
- Zur Lesung von manchen Personennamen auf den hieroglyphenhethitischen Siegeln und Inschriften. Ankara 1950.
- On the Occasion of a New Book Concerning the Hittites. Ankara University, DTCF Dergisi, X, 1952, p. 249-256.
- The N (N)-formations in the Hittite Language, Belleten 18, sayı 72, 1954, p. 449-467.
- Die Lage von Šamuha, Anatolia (Anadolu) I, 1956, p. 77-80.
- Zu den Körperteilnamen im Hethitischen, Anatolia (Anadolu) II, 1957 p. 1-48
- Eine hethitische Bronzestatuette und andere Funde aus Zara bei Amasya, Anatolia (Anadolu) VI, 1961/1962, p. 217-243.
- Kaniš = Aniša = Niša = Nysa, Erken Hitit Çağının bir Başkenti, Belleten 27, nr. 107, 1963, p. 366-376.
- Kaniš = Aniša = Niša, Eine Hauptstadt der frühhethitischen Periode, Belleten 27, nr. 107, 1963, p. 376-386.
- Frühbronzezeitliche Marmoridole aus Südwestanatolien, Belleten 29, nr. 113, 1965, p. 9-14.
- Eine goldene Gesichtmaske vom zweiten Vorchristlichen Jahrtausend aus "Anatolien", Belleten 29, nr. 113, 1965, p. 19-23.
- Die Libationsgefässe "Schnabelkanne" und "Armförmiges Gerät" und Ihre Hethitischen Bezeichnungen, Belleten 31, nr. 124, 1967, p. 531-549.
- Zylinder-und Stempelsiegel aus Karahöyük bei Konya, Ankara 1968. T.T.K. Yayınları: Dizi-V, No. 26, XVI + 310 s. 276 Abbildungen im Texte, 254 Tafeln.
- Ein hethitisches Stempelsiegel aus der Umgebung von Afyonkarahisar und ein Knopfsiegel aus Yazırhöyük bei Nevşehir, Festschrift P. Meriggi, 1970, p. 1-6.
- Eine weitere Hieroglypheninschrift aus Emirgazi und ein Rollsiegel mit Hieroglyphenlegenden aus dem Gebiet von Adıyaman, südöstlich von Malatya, Festschrift Heinrich Otten, 1973 p. 11-15, 1975.
- Ištar auf dem Karahöyük, presented to Prof. Mansel, 1974, p. 703-707.
- Eine neue hieroglyphenhethitische Inschrift der Gruppe Kızıldağ-Karadağ aus der Nähe von Aksaray und die früher publizierten Inschriften derselben Gruppe, Anatolian Studies Presented to Hans Gustav Güterbock on the Occasion of his 65th Birthday, 1974, p. 17-27.
- Die Hethiter in Anatolien, Das Parliament 1976,
- Remarques sur la géographie de la région du Haut-Yeşilırmak d'après les tablettes hittites de Maşathöyük, Florilegium Anatolicum, Mélanges offerts à Emmanuel Laroche, Paris, 1979 p. 29-35.
- Die Lage der Kultstadt Hanhana, Festschrift Elmar Edel, Bamberg 1979, p. 13-16.
- Das hethitische Wort für "Palast", Studia Mediterranea I, Piero Meriggi dicata I, 1979, p. 17-25.
- Die hethitischen Tontafelentdeckungen auf dem Maşat-Höyük, Belleten 44, nr. 173, 1980, p. 254-59.
- Beiträge zur Erforschung des hethitischen Tempels, Kultanlagen im Lichte der Keilschrifttexte, Ankara 1983. Turkish Historical Society Publication: Serie - VI, Nr. 23 XXXIV + 382 s.
- Zum Wesen der kultischen Reinigungssubstanz tuhhueššar, Festschrift A. Kammenhuber.
- Die Lage der hethitischen Kultstadt Karahna, Festschrift Kurt Bittel
- E. Neufeld, The Hittite Laws, Journal of Cuneiform Studies VI, 1952, s.93-98.
- B. Rosenkranz, Beiträge zur Erforschung des Luwischen, Bibliotheca Orientalis XI, 1954, s.208-209.
- Th. Beran, Die hethitische Glyptik von Boğazköy I, Orientalistische Literaturzeitung 66, 1971, s. 362-364.
