= Boncuklu Höyük =

Neolithic archaeological site in Turkey

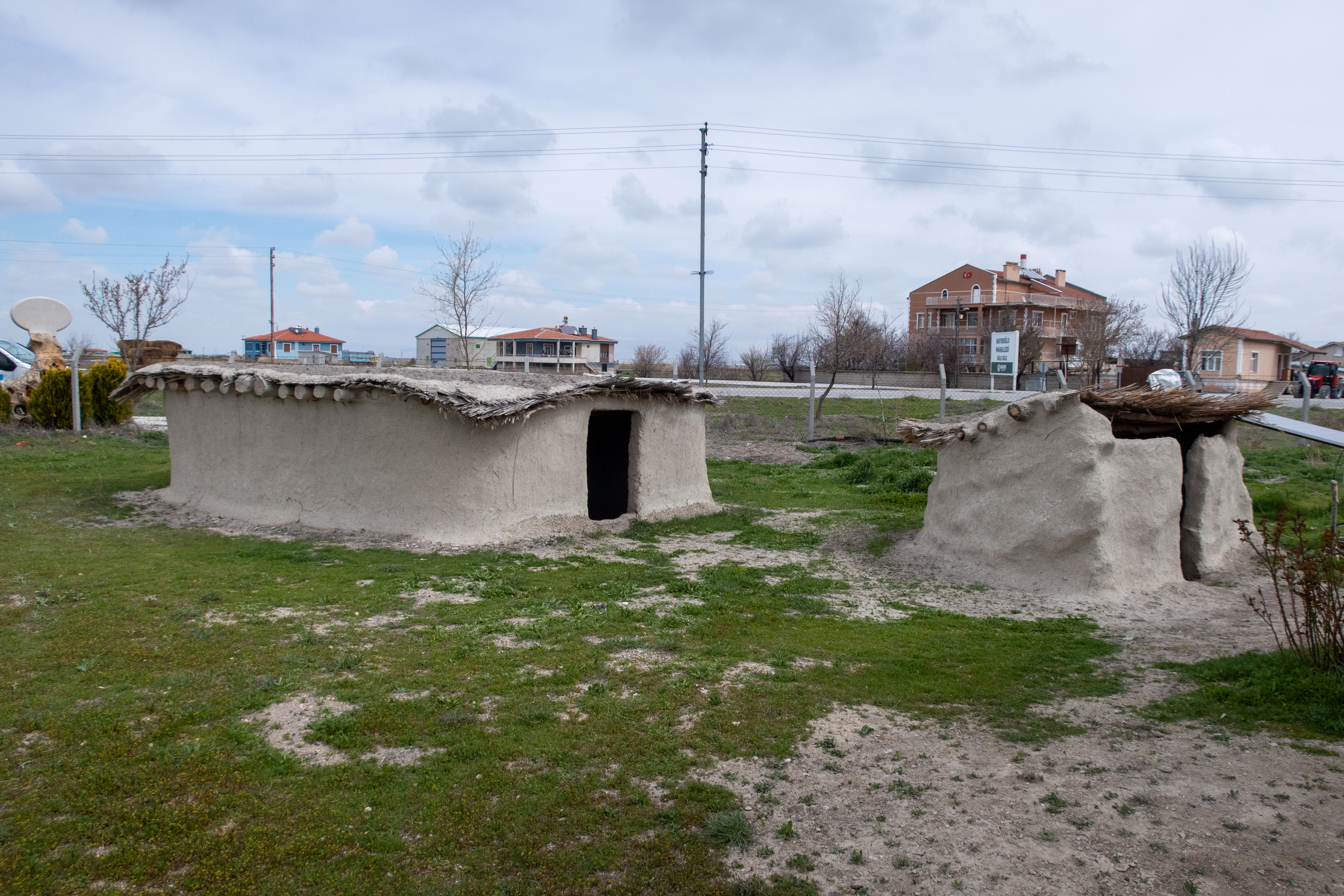
- Reconstructed Huts at Boncuklu Höyük

- Location within Turkey Location within Near East Location within West and Central Asia
- 37°45′6.588″N 32°51′53.208″E
- Type: Settlement
- Periods: Neolithic
- Location: Hayıroğlu, Konya Province, Turkey
- Region: Anatolia

Boncuklu Höyük is a Neolithic archaeological site in Central Anatolia, Turkey, situated around 9 km from the more famous Çatalhöyük site. The tell is made up of the remains of one of the world's oldest villages, occupied between around 8300 to 7800 BCE. The buildings are small and oval shaped with walls constructed of mudbricks. The remains of burials of human bodies were found below the floors of the buildings. The earliest known ceramics of Anatolia have been discovered there.

The site was first recorded by Douglas Baird of the University of Liverpool in 2001. He has directed excavations there since 2006.

The site of Boncuklu is characterized by some of the first appearance of agriculture in the Anatolian plateau, through the introduction of small-scale agricultural projects. It is considered as a precussor of the large-scale agricultural developments of Çatalhöyük from 7100 BCE.

== See also ==
- Çatalhöyük
- Aşıklı Höyük
- Gobekli Tepe
