= Konya-Karahöyük =

Archaeological site in Turkey

- Karahöyük 1, Karahoyuk Konya
- Location within Turkey
- 37°49′14″N 32°26′55″E
- Type: settlement
- Periods: Late Chalcolithic, Hittite Empire, Middle Bronze Age
- Location: Turkey
- Region: Konya Province

Site notes
- Excavation dates: 1953-1992
- Archaeologists: Sedat Alp

Konya-Karahöyük, also known as Karahöyük 1, is a tell in modern Turkey. The tell, or mound, was a Bronze Age (broadly 3300–1200 BC) settlement and trading locale in the Konya-Karaman Plain region of the Central Anatolian plateau. Sondages confirm that the site was occupied in successive phases from the Middle to Late Bronze Age; there is material evidence suggesting occupation from the Early Bronze Age or late Chalcolithic period.

Konya-Karahöyük is one of several archaeological sites dated to the Bronze Age or earlier in Central Anatolia, including the distinct but nearby and similarly named Türkmen-Karahöyük. The tell is 19m high and covers around 33ha. Its total area is estimated at nearly 100ha, making it one of the most expansive in Central Anatolia.

Konya-Karahöyük is 8 km southwest of modern Konya.

== Archaeology ==
Excavations at the Konya-Karahöyük tell began in 1953 under the direction Sedat Alp and continued until 1992. These excavations uncovered artifacts of material culture in the settlement which were dated to the 3rd and 2nd millennia BCE.

Excavations of the settlement resumed in 2022. Finds include bullae (seals) which evidence relations between Anatolia, Syria, and the Aegean. Excavations also revealed cultural connections dating to the Early Bronze Age between the Konya-Karahöyük settlement and locations including Troy I and Troy II. Finds also include ceramics similar to examples from Kültepe, Acemhöyük, and Alişar Höyük; these goods may have been imported to Konya-Karahöyük.

Konya-Karahöyük may have been a karum, or trade post, on the important Old Assyrian trade network in Anatolia. Hardstone carving ("glyptic") artifacts share similarities with Assyrian examples; some of the seals display Assyrian-style anthropomorphic scenes. If indeed a karum, Konya-Karahöyük would have been a marginal and occasional stop at the network's western limit, unlike its eastern neighbor Acemhöyük which was fully integrated into the trade system. As such, it is doubtful that Assyrian commercial caravans visited Konya-Karahöyük with any regularity.

Konya-Karahöyük may have been part of an extra-Assyrian trade network of market settlements in Anatolia and northern Syria, evidenced by artifacts bearing the imprints of cylinder seals from locations including Carchemish and Alalakh.

Finds from Konya-Karahöyük and other ancient settlements in the Konya-Karaman Plain are collected in the Konya Archaeological Museum.

== See also ==
- Konya-Karaman Plain
- Türkmen-Karahöyük
