= Meydancık Castle =

Ruins of an ancient castle in Mersin Province, Turkey

- Gülnar, Mersin Province
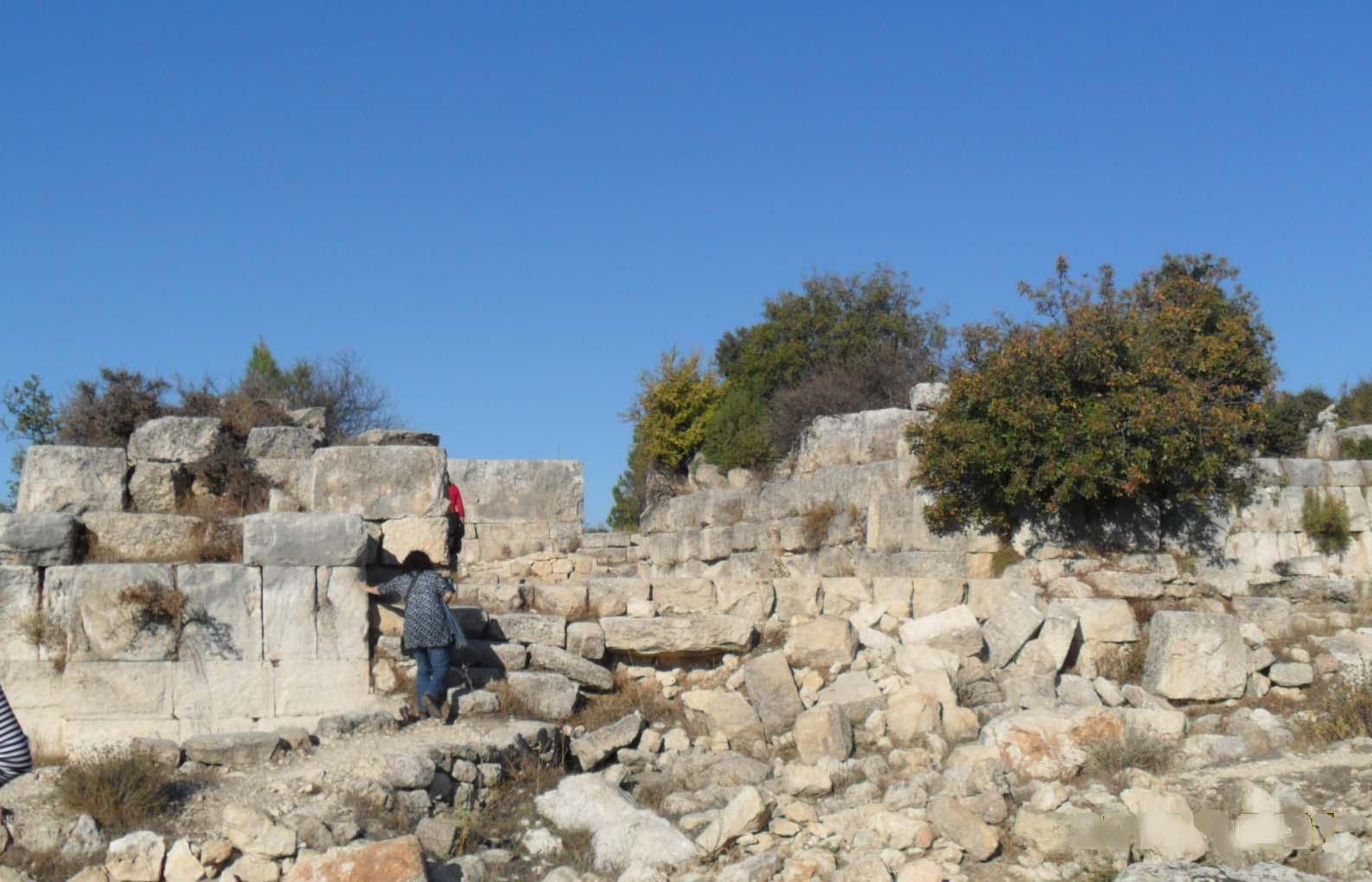

Site information
- Type: Fortress
- Open to the public: Yes

Location
- Location within Turkey
- Coordinates: 36°17′03″N 33°25′47″E

Site history
- Built by: Pirandu (Luwian People)
- Demolished: Most of it

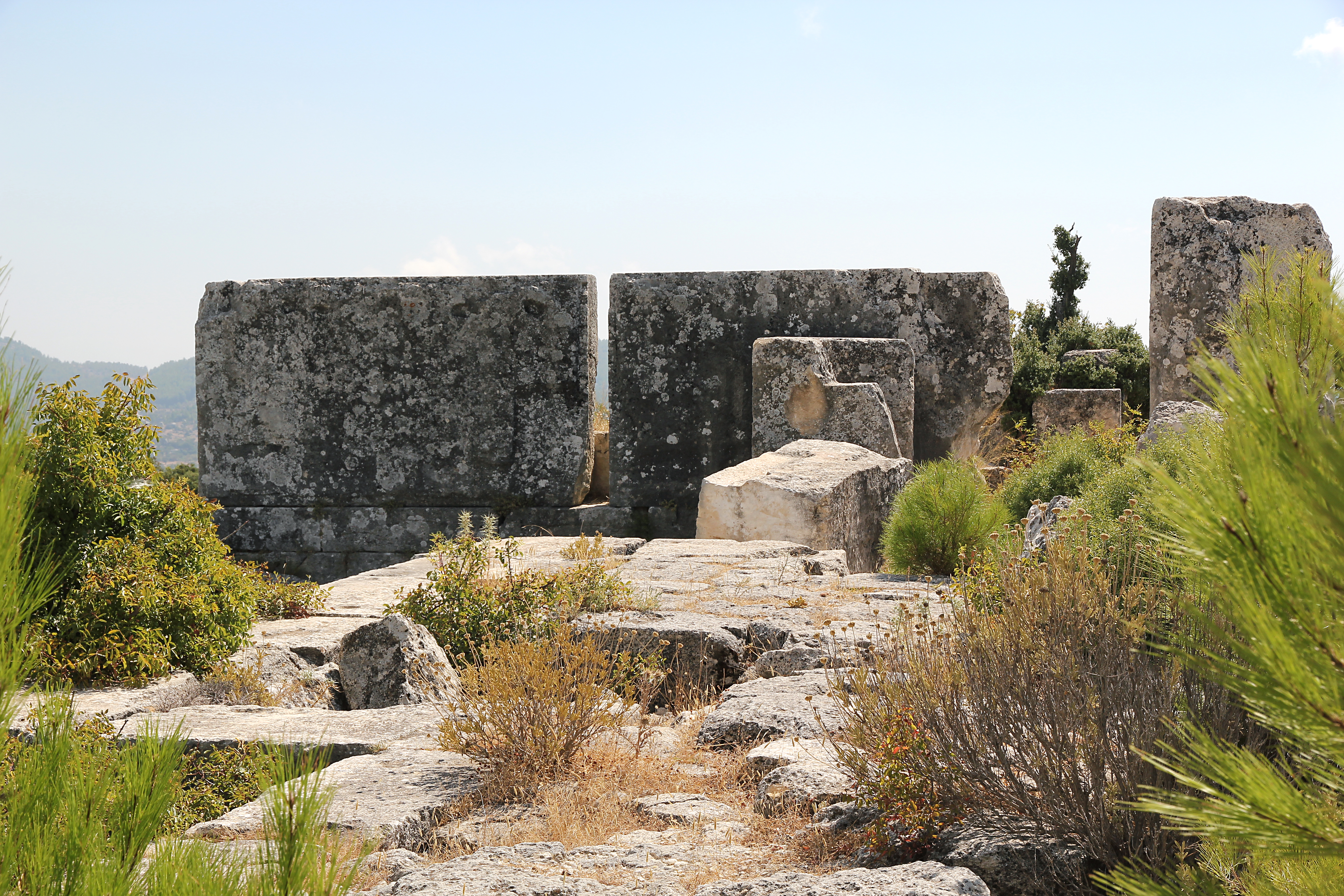

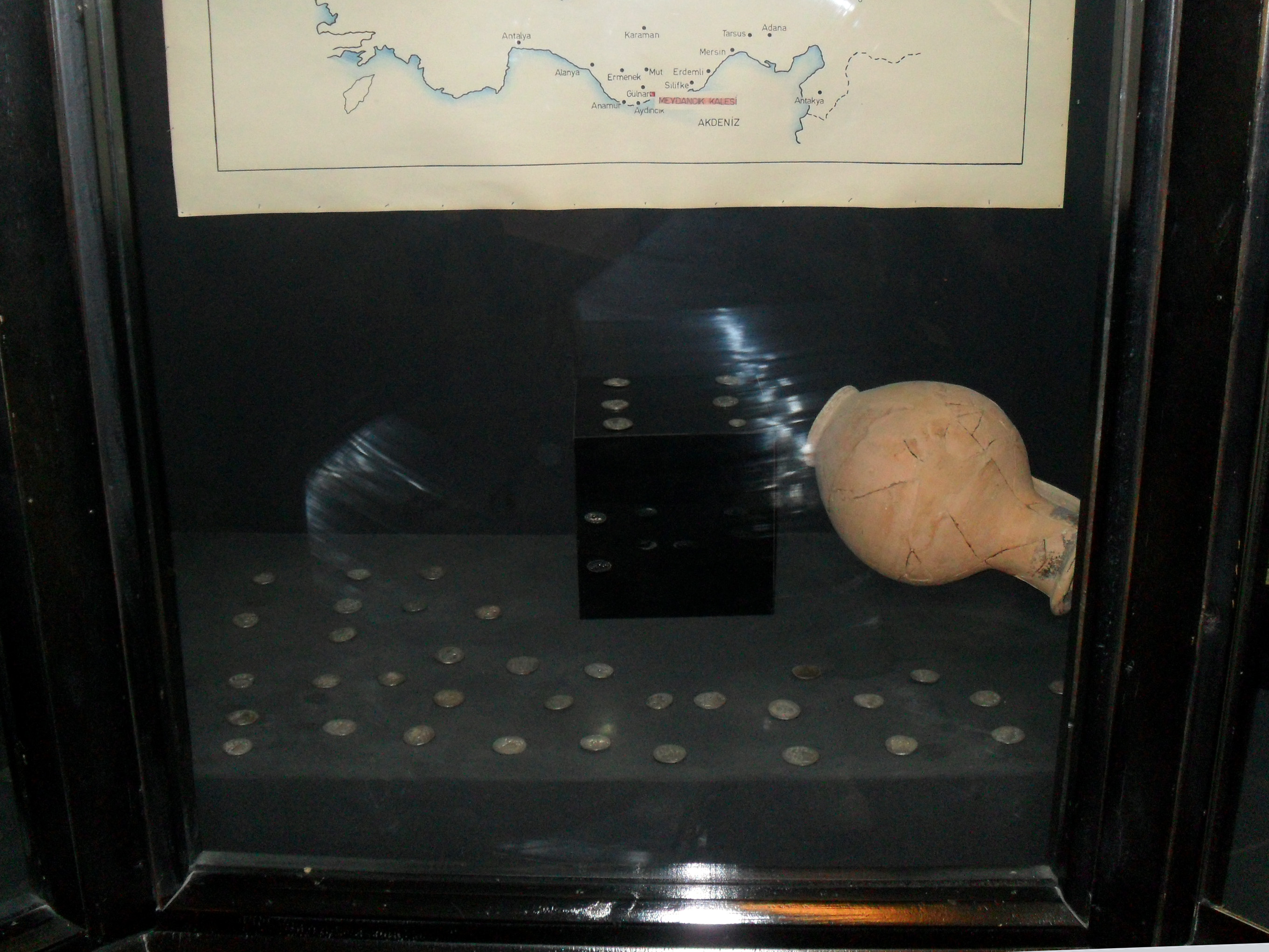
Coins from Meydancık Castle in Silifke Museum

Meydancık Castle (Turkish: Meydancık Kale) is a castle ruin in Mersin Province, Turkey. The original name was Kirshu and the name of the ruin during Ottoman times was Beydili Kale.

== Geography ==
The castle is located at 37°17′03″N 33°25′47″E, south of Gülnar. It is on a 700-metre (2,300 ft) hill at the west of the road between Gülnar and Aydıncık. Visitors can reach the castle either from Gülnar by an 11 kilometres (6.8 mi) road or from Aydıncık by a 35 kilometres (22 mi) road. From Mersin the total distance (via Gülnar) is about 165 kilometres (103 mi).

== History ==
After the collapse of the Hittite Empire, Anatolia experienced a period of turmoil. Many small states emerged, one of which was Pirandu in South Anatolia, which was established by the Luwian people at the west of the Göksu River around the 7th century BC. The capital of Pirandu was Kirshu. However, in the 6th century BC, Kirshu was sacked by the Babylon Emperor Neriglissar. After Babylon was defeated by the Persians, Kirshu came under Achaemenid rule and after the Achaemenid Empire was defeated by Alexander III of Macedon, Kirshu was incorporated within the realm of the Ptolemaic dynasty of Egypt and later that of the Seleucid Empire.

== The fortification ==
The plan of the fortification is roughly rectangular, with the longer dimension oriented along a north–south axis. The total area is 750 × 150 m^{2} (2460 × 490 ft^{2}) In the fortification the military units were at the north side of the hill and the only entrance to the castle was via the gate at the northeast corner. The palace was in the middle. A public treasure consisting of 5215 coins from various Hellenistic states has been unearthed in the palace. These coins are now exhibited in Silifke Museum. Another important find was a stamp of Muwatalli II, which was surprising because Hittites inhabited the area long before the establishment of Pirundu. At the southern end, there is a wide wellhole, the function of which is debatable. It might either be a cistern or an altar or may even be a secret passage. At the present, excavations down to 23 metres (75 ft) give no clue.
