= Gezlevi =

Settlement in Turkey

Gezlevi Korualan
- Neighbourhood
- Location in Turkey Gezlevi (Turkey Central Anatolia)
- Coordinates: 37°00′N 32°20′E
- Country: Turkey
- Province: Konya
- District: Hadim
- Elevation: 1,430 m (4,690 ft)
- Population (2022): 1,311
- Time zone: UTC+3 (TRT)
- Postal code: 42830
- Area code: 0332

Gezlevi (formerly: Korualan) is a neighbourhood of the municipality and district of Hadim, Konya Province, Turkey. Its population is 1,311 (2022). Before the 2013 reorganisation, it was a town (belde).

== Geography ==
Gezlevi is a mountain town with an altitude of about 1,430 metres (4,690 ft). It is quite far from the main state roads. Distance to Hadim is approximately 20 kilometres (12 mi) and to Konya is 150 kilometres (93 mi).

== History ==
There are almost no written records about the deep history of Gezlevi. Probably, the town was a summer camp of the Turkmen tribes during Karamanid beylik (principality) during 13th–15th centuries. Korualan was a small village in the early 20th century. Korulan was declared a township in 1971.

== Economy ==
Animal husbandry as well as fruit gardening (such as cherry) are the most important economic activities. There are a few carpet weaving looms. But the unemployment rate is high and the younger generation tend to move to big cities to work in industry or in services.
