= Apa Dam =

Coordinates: 37.3597°N 32.5454°E

- Interactive map of Apa Dam
- Location: Turkey

Apa Dam is a dam in Konya Province, Turkey, built between 1958 and 1962.

== 2021 Drought in the Konya Province ==
Apa Dam was the dam at the lowest level, just 4%, out of all the dams in the Konya Province during its drought in 2021.

== See also ==
- List of dams and reservoirs in Turkey
