= Silifke Museum =

Archaeology museum in Turkey

Coordinates: 36°22′25″N 33°56′32″E

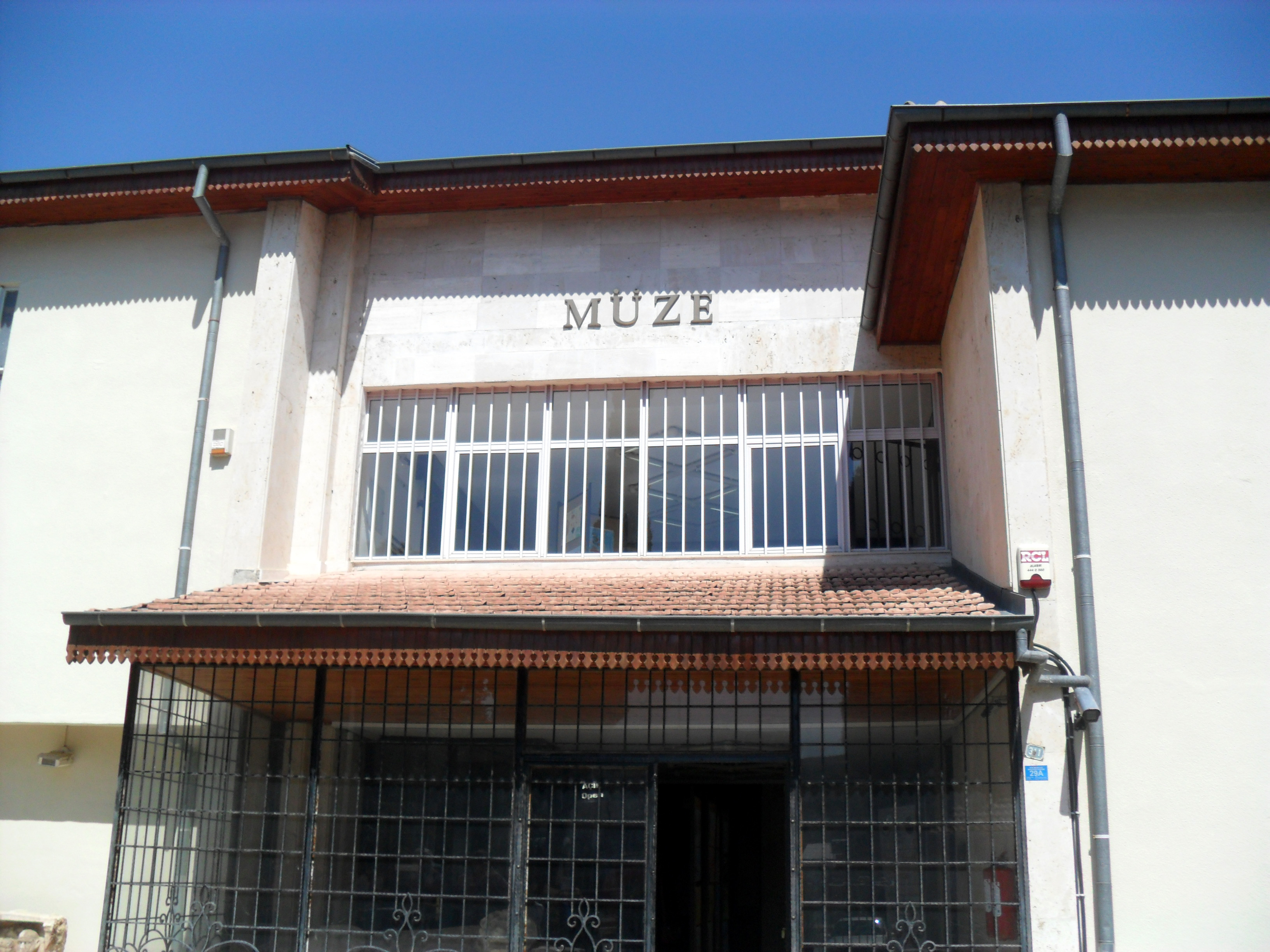
- Established: 1973
- Location: Taşucu yolu, Silifke,
- Type: Archaeology, ethnography
- Director: İlhame Öztürk

Silifke Museum is in Silifke district of Mersin Province, Turkey.

== History ==
The first museology activity in Silifke dates back to 1939. The findings in Silifke district which is rich in archaeological wealth were collected in a former primary school building which itself is older than a century. After the museum building was constructed the museum was opened to public on 2 August 1973.

== Exhibition ==
In the yard of the museum stonemasonry items are displayed including various types of column headings, sarcophaguses, Moslem tombstones etc. The building has four showrooms. In the showroom in the groundfloor there are various sculptures. The first room of the first floor is dedicated to ethnographic items mostly on Yörük life. In the other two rooms, handicrafts and ornaments are displayed. The Luvian Hellenistic coins of ca. 5th century BC, found in Meydancık Castle about 80 kilometres (50 mi) west of Silifke are also displayed in Silifke museum.

== Number of items ==
Earlier works are from the Neolithic age. Hellenistic, Roman, Byzantine, Seljuk and Ottoman works are also displayed.

- Archaeologic:2975
- Ethnographic:1410
- Coin:15875
- Seal:77

== Gallery ==
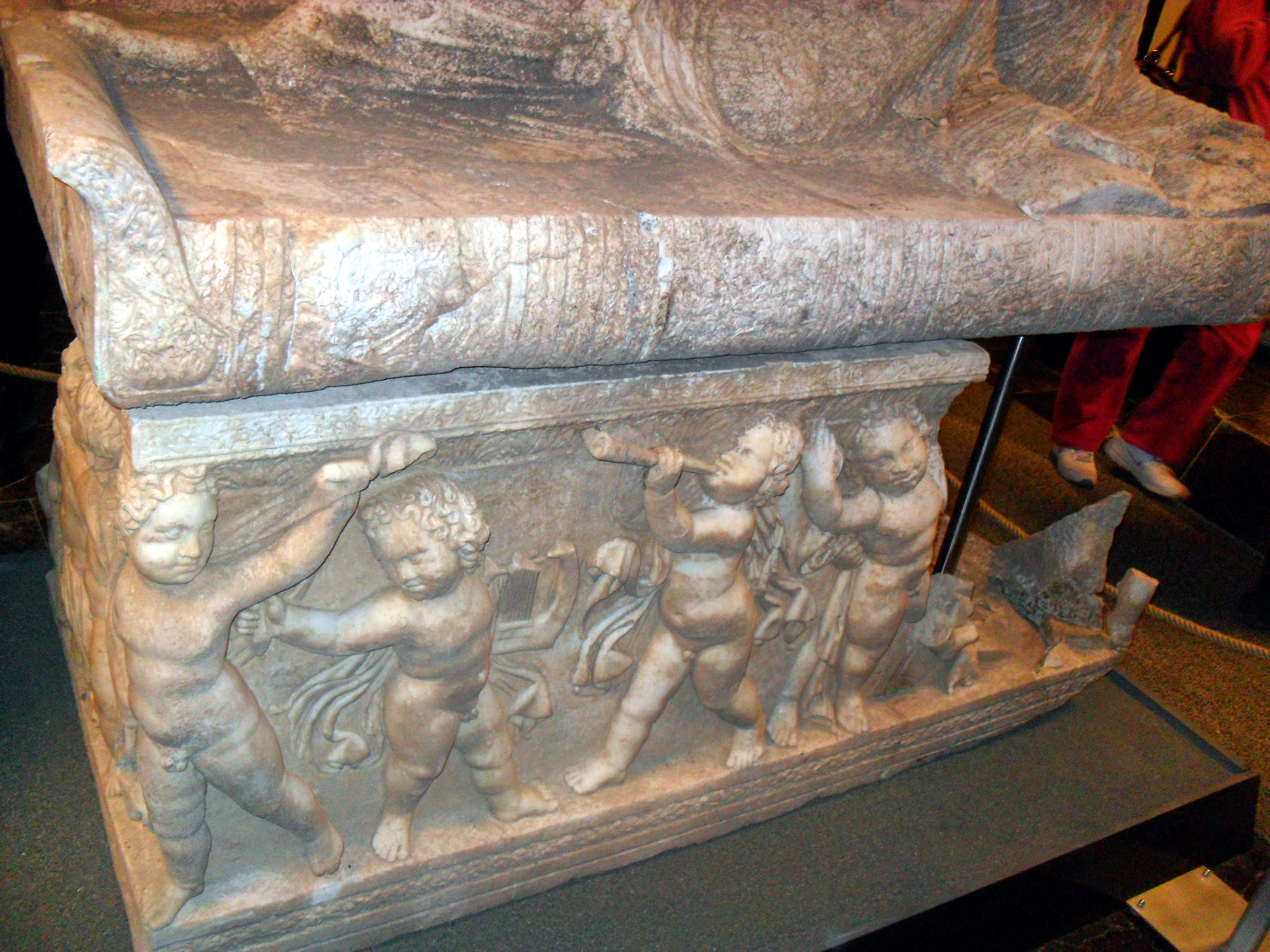

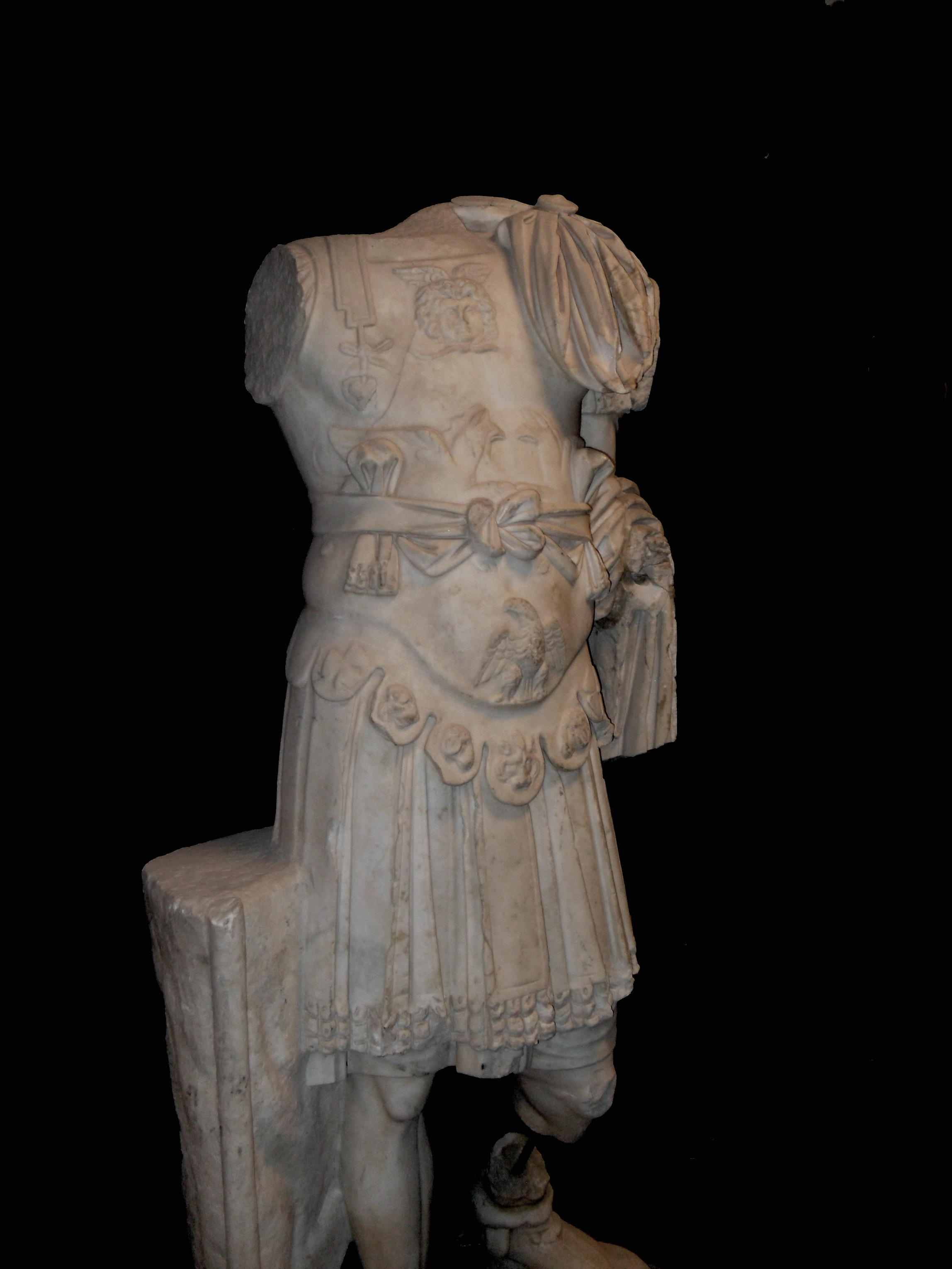

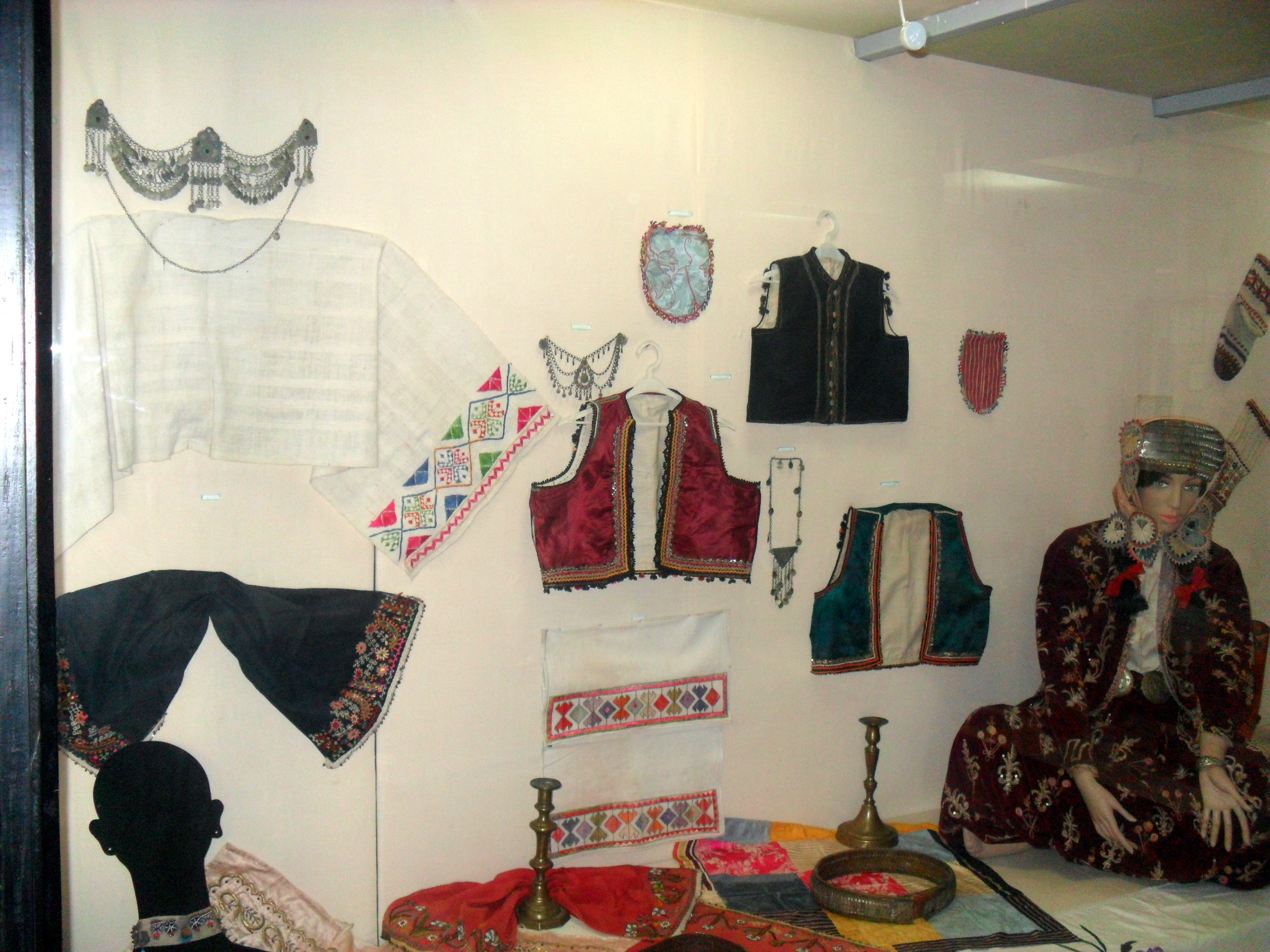

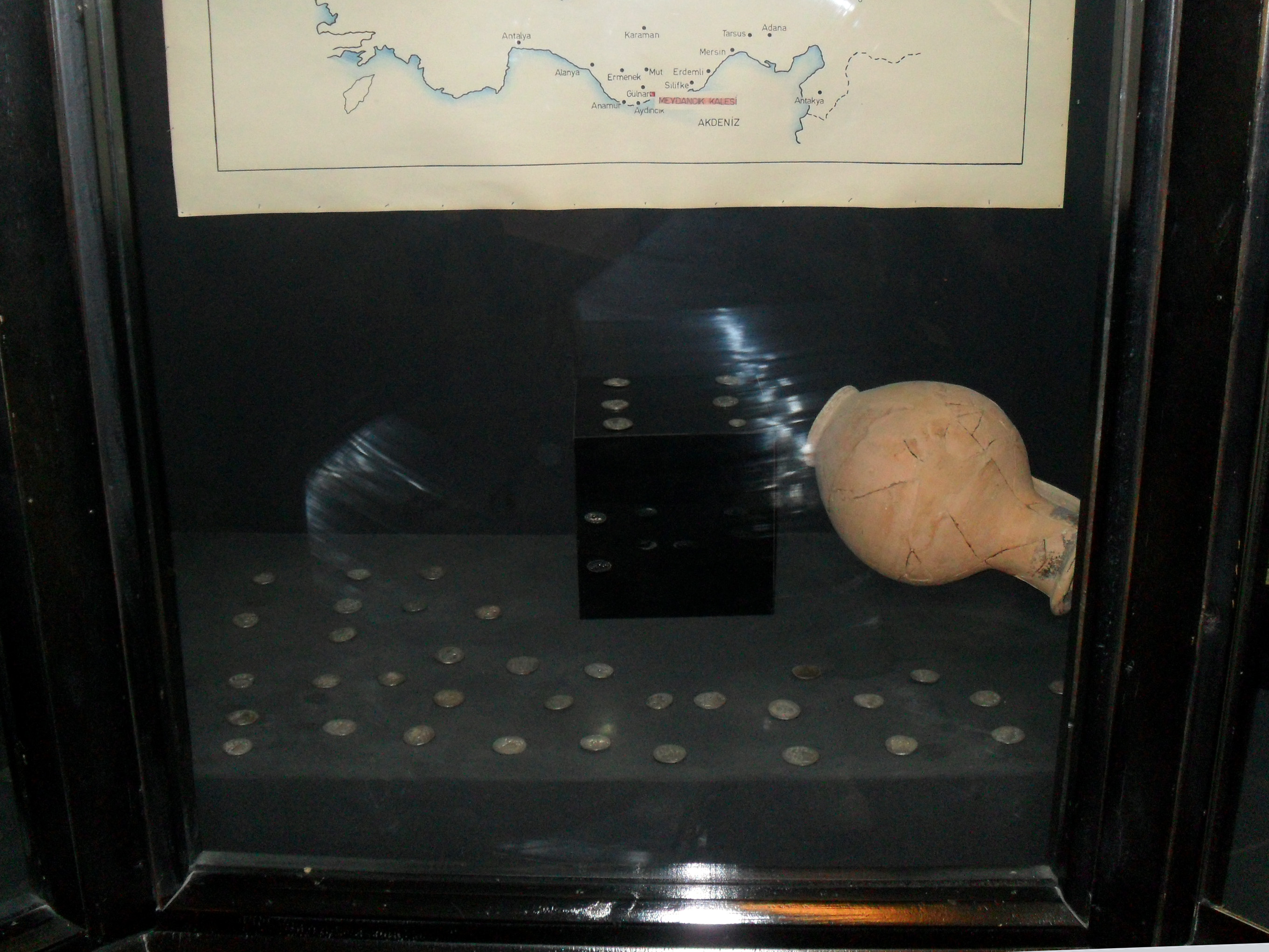
