= Türkmen-Karahöyük =

Archaeological site in Turkey

Coordinates: 37°37′21″N 33°01′46″E

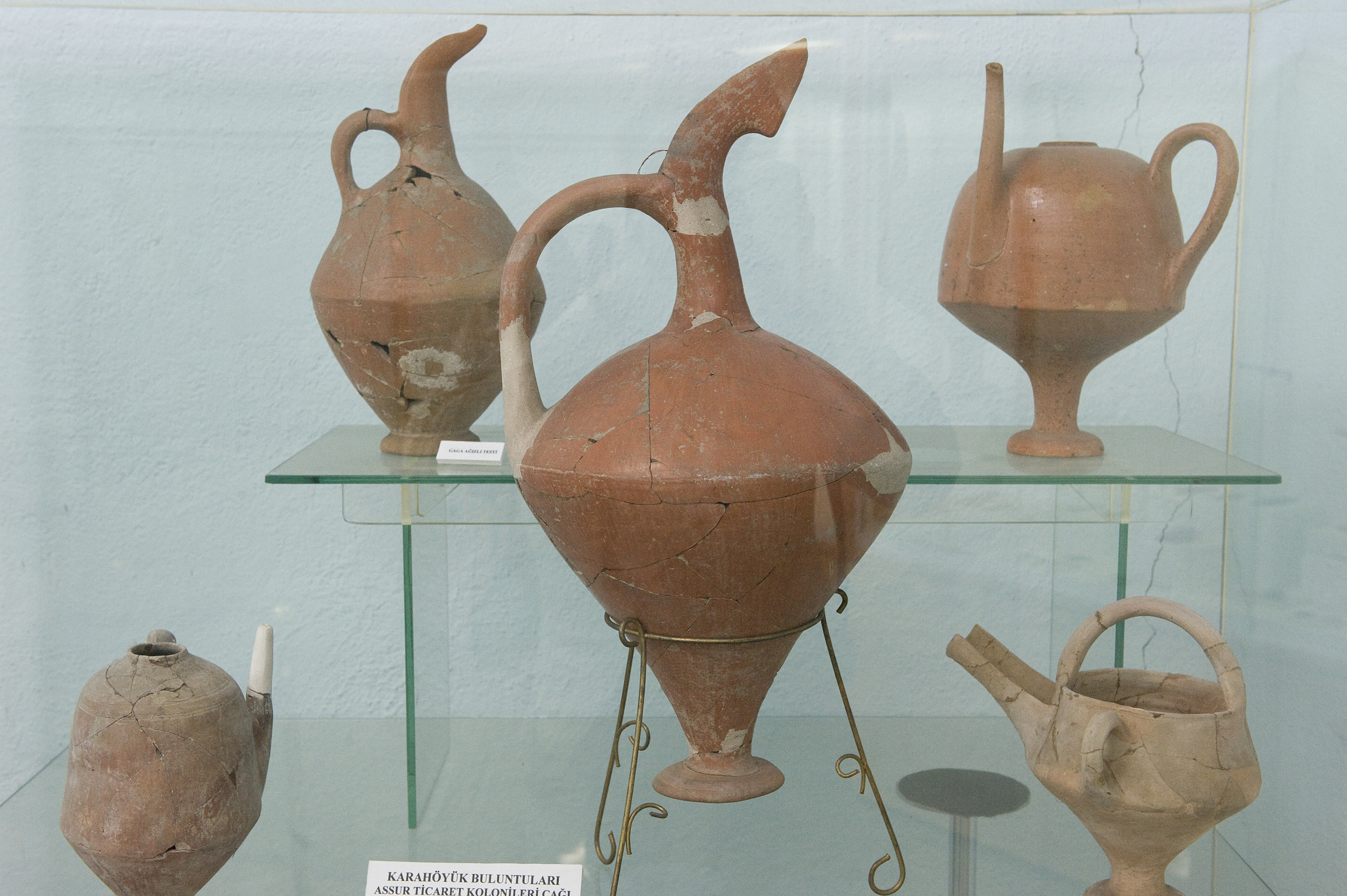
Assyrian Colonial period finds from Karahöyük - Konya Archaeological Museum

Türkmen-Karahöyük is an archaeological site in the Central Anatolian region of Turkey, on the Konya Plain. It was a regionally prominent settlement from the Bronze Age through Classical antiquity. Its settlement mound, or tell, occupies approximately 30 hectares and rises 35 meters above the surrounding plain. The site may have been the center of a polity on the Konya and Karaman plains in the Iron Age.

Türkmen-Karahöyük is about 20km east of Çatalhöyük. It is near Mount Karadağ, an important site in Hittite religion. The site was first excavated in 2017.

== Archaeology ==
Artifacts recovered at Türkmen-Karahöyuk include ceramics and an inscription in Hieroglyphic Luwian.

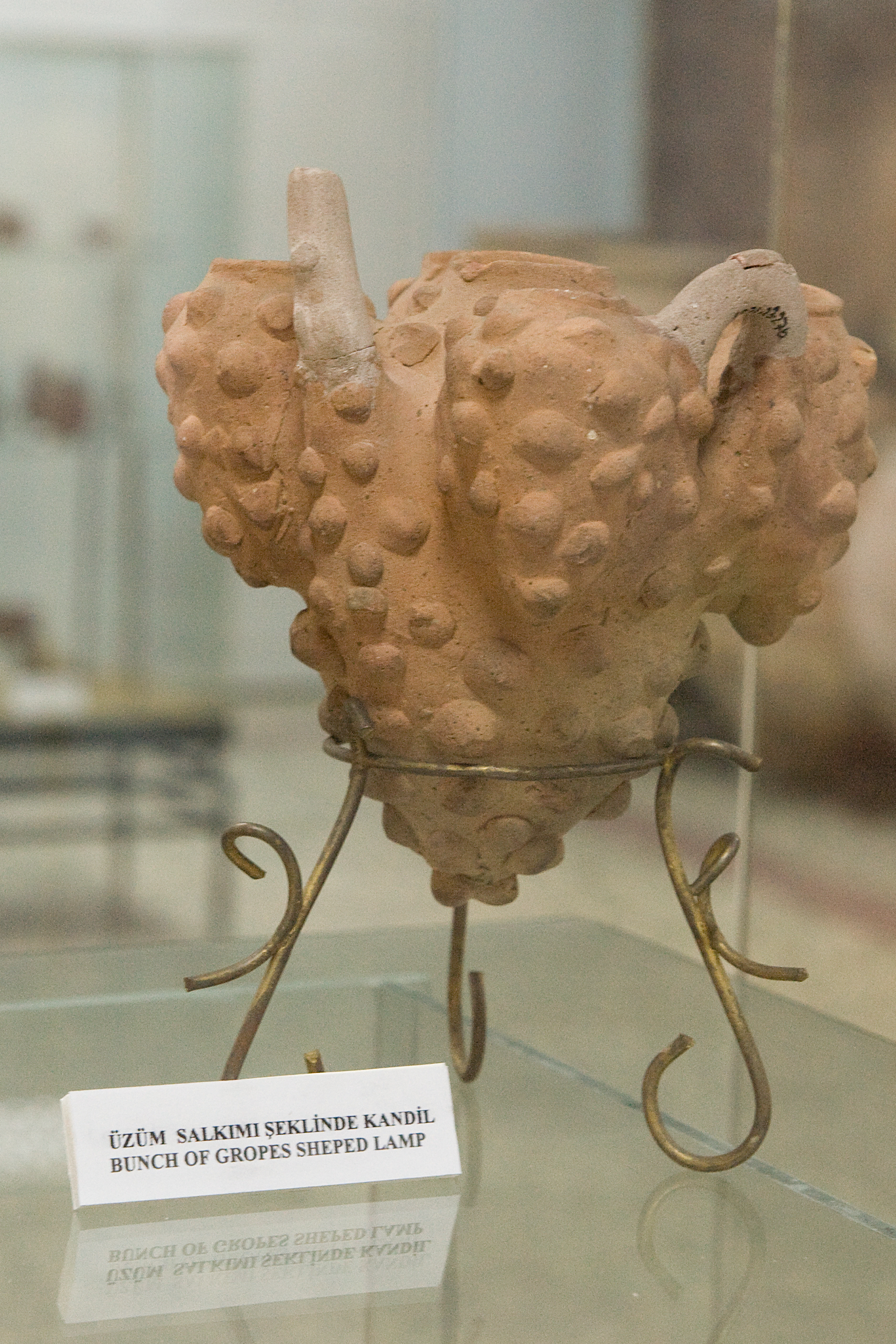
Lamp shaped as a grape cluster, Old Assyrian period, at the Konya Archaeological Museum.

Türkmen-Karahöyük has been proposed as the location of Tarḫuntašša, the Hittite capital for a brief period during the reign of Muwatalli II, and may have been the capital or administrative center of an 8th century BC polity that occupied much of the Konya and Karaman plains.

== See also ==
- Konya-Karahöyük
