= Hadim =

- District and municipality
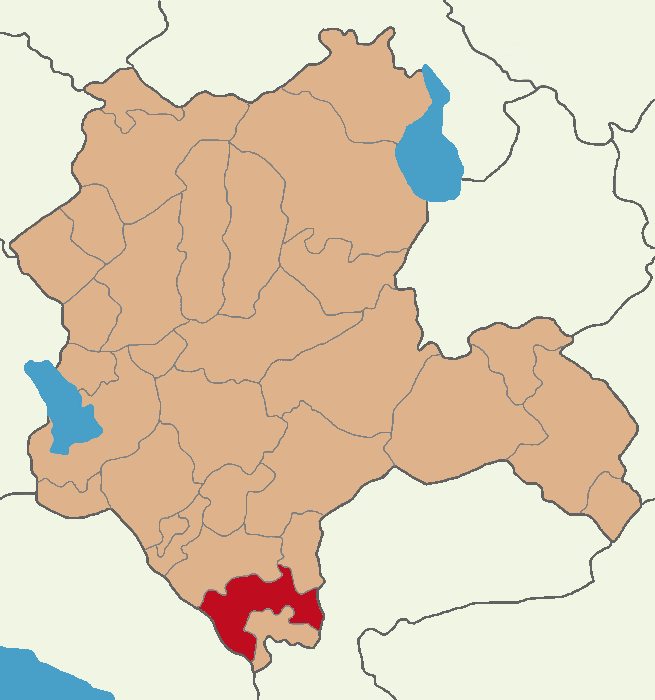
- Map showing Hadim District in Konya Province

- Location in Turkey Hadim (Turkey Central Anatolia)
- Coordinates: 36°59′18″N 32°27′25″E
- Country: Turkey
- Province: Konya

Government
  - Mayor: Mehmet Çetiner (AKP)
- Area: 1,165 km^{2} (450 sq mi)
- Elevation: 1,532 m (5,026 ft)
- Population (2022): 10,999
  - Density: 9.441/km^{2} (24.45/sq mi)
- Time zone: UTC+3 (TRT)
- Postal code: 42830
- Area code: 0332
- Website: www.hadim.bel.tr

Hadim is a municipality and district of Konya Province, Turkey. Its area is 1,165 km^{2}, and its population is 10,999 (2022). Its elevation is 1,532 m (5,026 ft).

== History ==
The area now known as Hadim was settled by a tribe of Turkmen originating from Bukhara following the victory of the Seljuk Turks at the battle of Malazgirt. Hadim was well regarded in Ottoman times as a source for Islamic scholars and their training, this is reflected in the villages previous name, Belde-i Hadimül-ilm meaning place which serves the sciences.

The scholars of Hadim fulfilled an important role in the Turkification of Anatolia. A notable scholar from Hadim was Seyyid Bayram Veli who founded the village of Dedemli in Hadim district. Bayram Veli was a dervish who had migrated from the region of Khorosan to avoid the incoming Mongol invasion. He was known to give spiritual and religious advice to sultan Alâeddin Keykubat I of the Sultanate of Rum.

Hadim had a number of Sayyid families with many of them the descendants of Hüsameddin Efendi who was a descendant of Ja'far al-Sadiq. the most influential of Hüsameddins descendants was Ebu Said Muhammed Hâdimî. Ebu Said hadimi was known as one of the greatest scholars of his time and performed sermons in the Ayasofya-i Kebir Cami-i Şerifi upon the invitation of sultan Mahmud I

== Composition ==
There are 32 neighbourhoods in Hadim District:

- Armağanlar
- Aşağı Hadim
- Aşağıeşenler
- Aşağıkızılkaya
- Bademli
- Beyreli
- Bolat
- Çiftepınar
- Dedemli
- Dolhanlar
- Dülgerler
- Eğiste
- Fakılar
- Gaziler
- Gerez
- Gezlevi
- Göynükkışla
- Gülpınar
- Hocalar
- İğdeören
- Kalınağıl
- Kaplanlı
- Küplüce
- Oduncu
- Sarnıç
- Selahattin
- Taşpınar
- Umurlar
- Yağcı
- Yelmez
- Yenikonak
- Yukarıeşenler
