= Blue Tunnel Project =

Blue Tunnel Project, is an effort to provide large-scale irrigation to arid lands of Konya Plain, in the Turkish heartland, where agriculture and wildlife are under threat.

Blue Tunnel, the most important part of the Konya Plain Project, is the second-largest irrigation scheme of Turkey after the Southeastern Anatolia Project (GAP), and aims to provide the region with a yearly 414 million cubic meters of water.
