= Çatalhöyük =

Archaeological site in Turkey

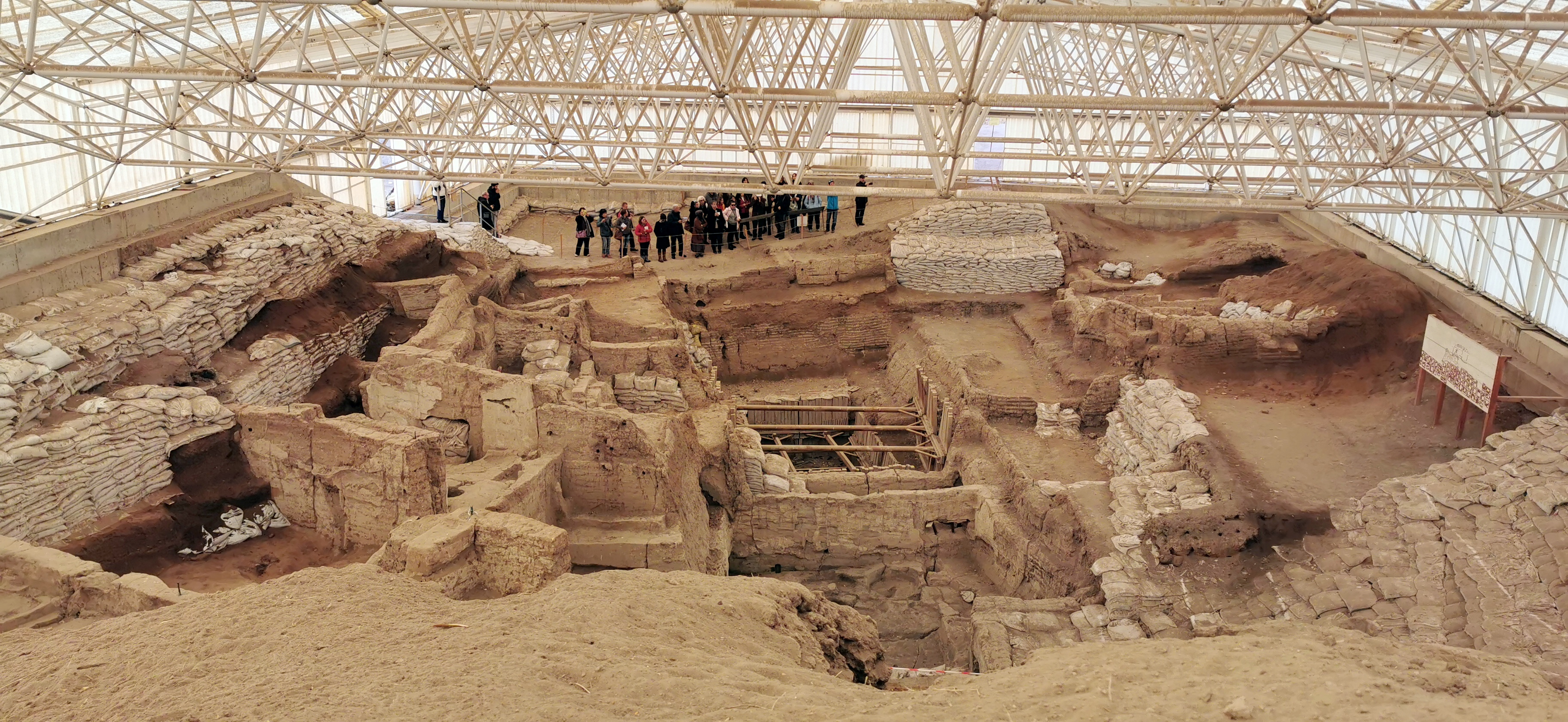
- Çatalhöyük in 2019

- Location in Turkey
- 37°40′00″N 32°49′41″E
- Type: Settlement
- Location: Kucukkoy, Konya, Turkey

History
- Built: c. 7100 BC
- Abandoned: c. 5600 BC

Site notes
- Excavation dates: 1958–1965, 1993–2018, 2025
- Archaeologists: James Mellaart; Ian Hodder
- Discovered: 1958 by James Mellaart

UNESCO World Heritage Site
- Official name: Neolithic Site of Çatalhöyük
- Type: Cultural
- Criteria: iii, iv
- Designated: 2012 (36th session)
- Reference no.: 1405
- Region: Western Asia

Çatalhöyük (English: Chatalhoyuk; /ˌtʃɑːtɑːlˈhuːjʊk/, cha-tal-HOO-yuhk; Turkish pronunciation: [tʃaˈtaɫhœjyc]; also Çatal Höyük and Çatal Hüyük; from Turkish çatal "fork" + höyük "tumulus") is a tell (a mounded accretion resulting from long-term human settlement) of a very large Neolithic and Chalcolithic proto-city settlement in southern Anatolia, which existed from around 7500 BC to 5600 BC and flourished around 7000 BC. Çatalhöyük overlooks the Konya Plain, southeast of the present-day city of Konya (ancient Iconium) in Turkey, around 140 km (87 mi) from the twin-coned volcano of Mount Hasan. It is notable for its large size, apparent egalitarian social structure, and value as a well-preserved example of early Neolithic-era permanent human settlements. In July 2012, it was designated a UNESCO World Heritage Site for its significance to human history

== Archaeology ==
The site of Çatalhöyük consists of two mounds separated by an extinct channel of the Çarşamba Stream.

- Eastern Mound - about 12.5 hectares (31 acres) in area with a height of about 20 metres (66 ft). Its initial occupation in the Neolithic period resulted in a thick layer of remains whose extent is uncertain due to overlying later remains. Abandoned after the Neolithic, aside from a few stray Bronze Age graves, it was later occupied in the Phrygian, Hellenistic, Roman, Byzantine, and Ottoman periods. Well-built structures were built at the top of the mound in the Hellenistic period. A fort was built there in the Roman period, and a number of Byzantine coins were found.
- Western Mound - about 400 m (1,300 ft) in diameter (covering an area of about 8.5 ha (21 acres)) with a height of about 7.5 m (25 ft), lying about 300 m (980 ft) to the west. It was occupied in the Early Chalcolithic period, beginning around 5600 BC. The original excavator used a periodisation of 12 levels, numbered 1–12. The current excavator replaced this with a different alphabetic schema involving levels A-Z.

The site was discovered by James Mellaart in 1958 during a regional survey of the Konya Plain. He led a team which excavated there for four seasons between 1961 and 1965. These excavations revealed this section of Anatolia as a centre of advanced culture in the Neolithic period. Excavation revealed 18 successive layers of buildings signifying various stages of the settlement and eras of history. It has been strongly suggested that a number of the purported wall paintings and drawings of lost figurines, many which have been use in other publications, were actually fabricated by Mellaart.

Mellaart was banned from Turkey for his involvement in the Dorak affair, in which he published drawings of supposedly important Bronze Age artifacts that later went missing. After this scandal, the site lay idle until 1993, when excavations began under the leadership of British Ian Hodder, then at the University of Cambridge. The Hodder-led excavations ended in 2018. The first two seasons of work were surface surveys with excavation beginning in 1995. Hodder, a former student of Mellaart, chose the site as the first "real world" test of his controversial theory of post-processual archaeology. The site has always had a strong research emphasis upon engagement with digital methodologies, driven by the project's experimental and reflexive methodological framework. According to Mickel, Hodder's Çatalhöyük Research Project (ÇRP) established itself as a site for progressive methodologies – in terms of adaptable and democratised recording, integration of computerised technologies, sampling strategies, and community involvement."

At the Western Mound, upon which Mellaart had only opened two trenches, in 1961, Jonathan Last and Catriona Gibson excavated in 1998. In 2006, two teams began work in the West Mound, one under the direction of Burçin Erdoğu and the other under the direction of Peter Biehl and Eva Rosenstock. Excavations continue under the direction of Ali Umut Türkcan from Anadolu University.

In August 2025, archaeologists led by Arkadiusz Marciniak of Poznań University revealed a mortuary structure referred to as the "House of the Dead" or "Spiritual House". The team uncovered a building where the remains of 20 individuals were placed beneath the floor, suggesting a ritual use. The discovery also included a large ceremonial structure adorned with painted walls and supported by fourteen platforms, as well as a smaller, plastered structure.

Finds at the site, from the Neolithic layers, included a number of textiles which are rarely preserved in early sites. Most were found in a burial context, often burnt, and all fragments. A number of lithics, almost all of obsidian, were found in those levels with the most numerous types being blades, flakes, projectile points, scrapers, daggers, and sickle blades. A number of Neolithic skeletons were also recovered, many from intramural inhumations and in many cases, secondary burials. Over 2,500 "casually baked" Neolithic clay figurines have been found, mostly animal but including 187 human.

== Culture ==
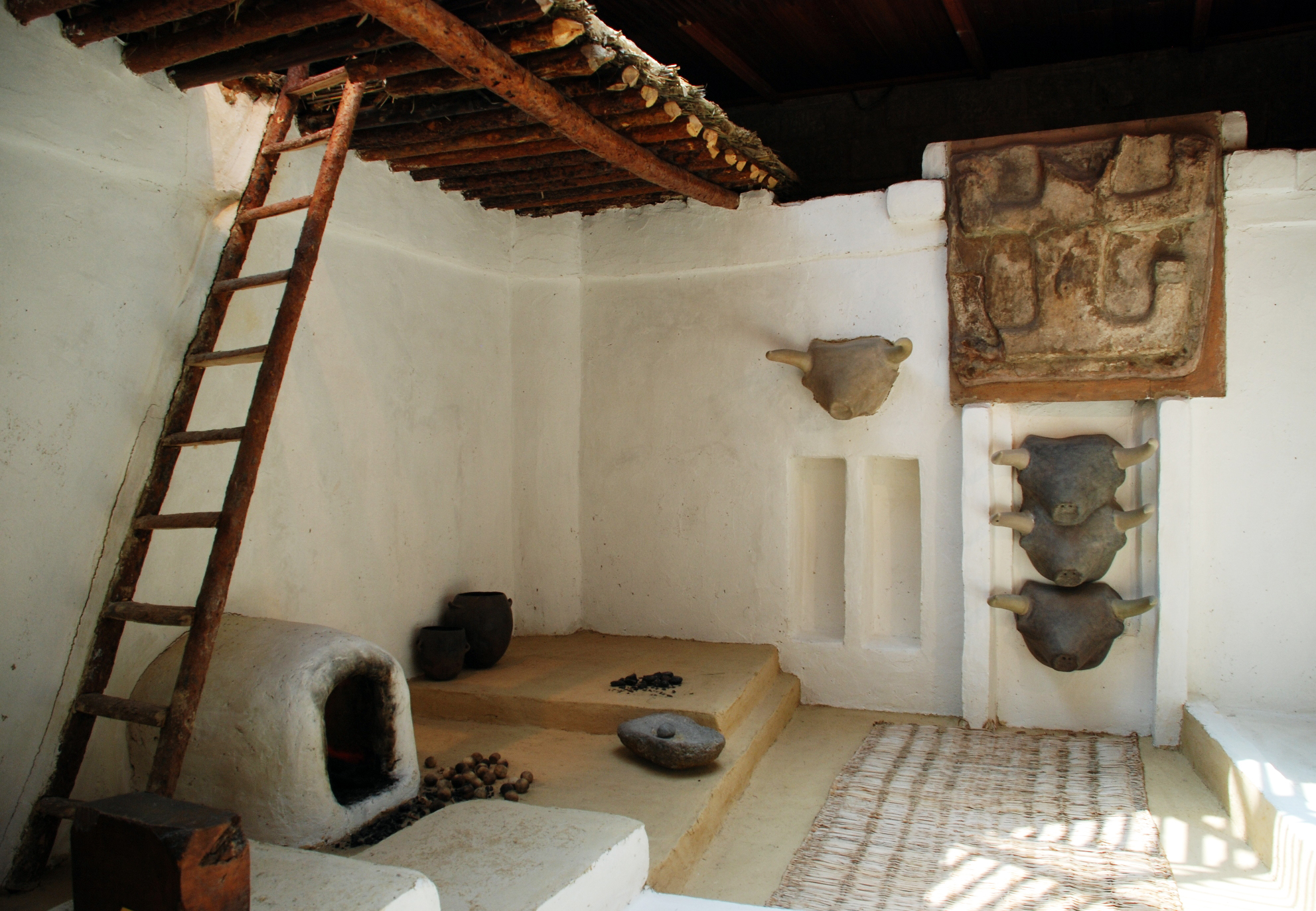
On-site restoration of a typical interior

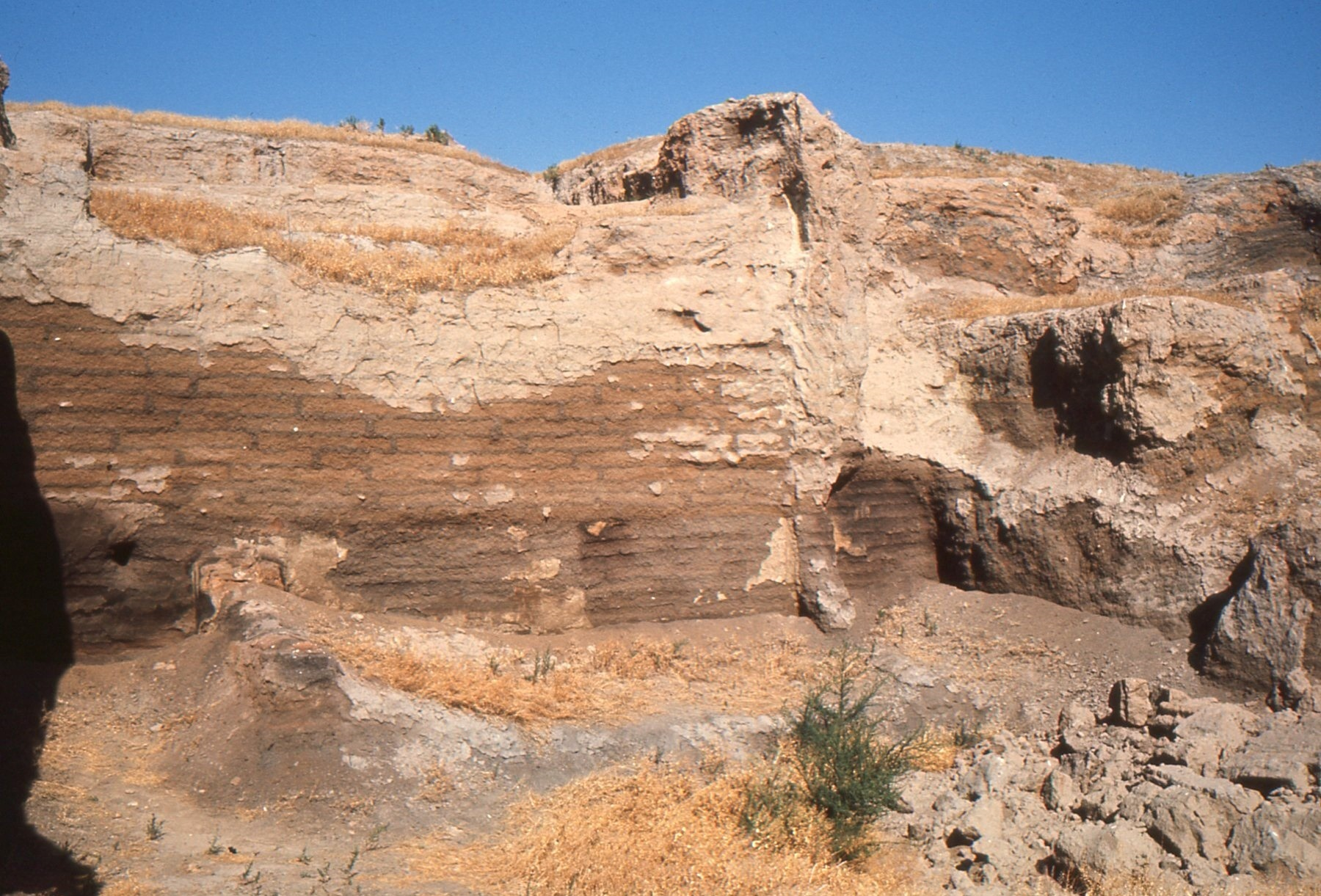
The earliest excavations of the site

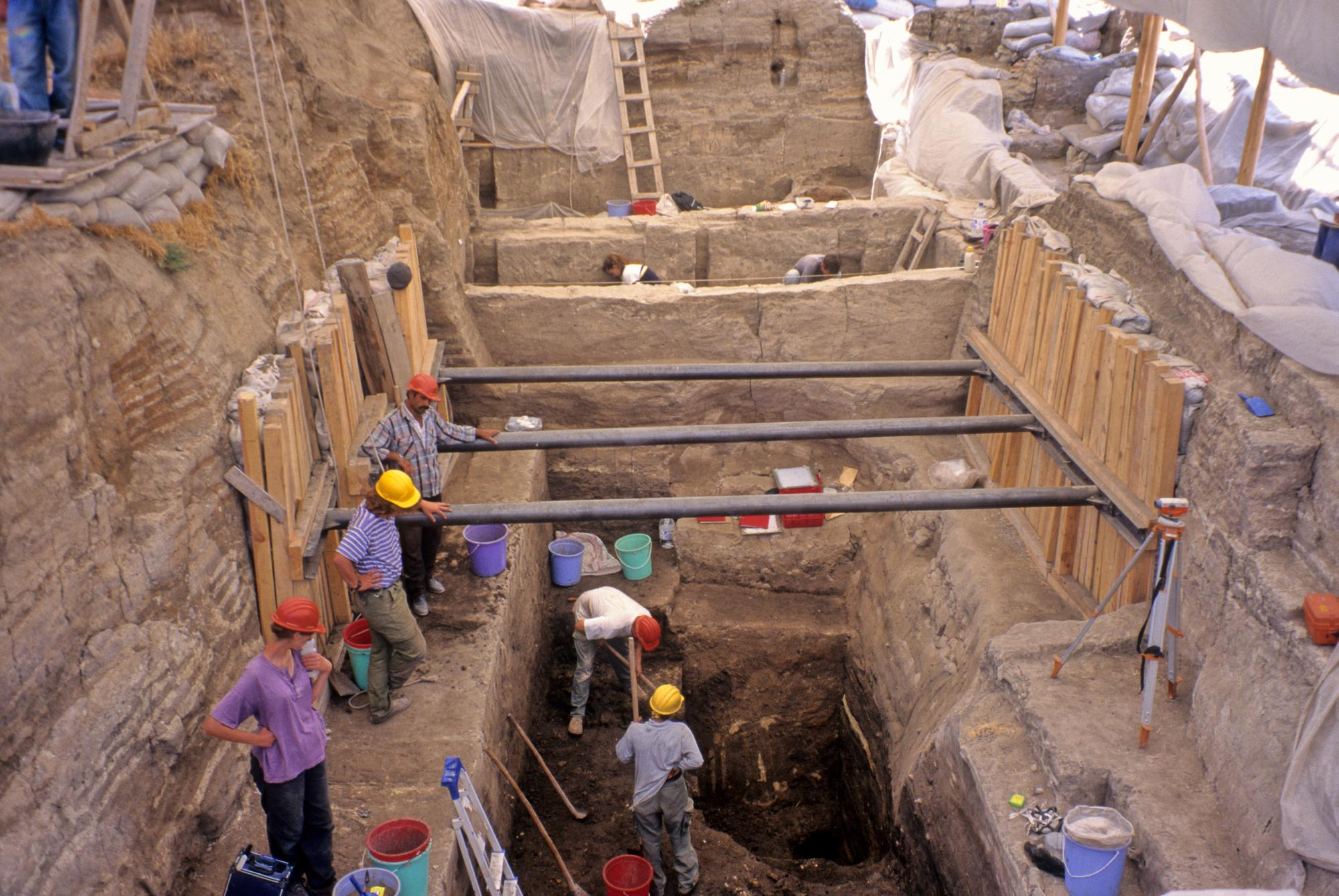
Deep trenches in the site

Animation showing a reconstruction of Çatalhöyük

Çatalhöyük was composed entirely of domestic buildings with no obvious public buildings. While some of the larger rooms have rather ornate murals, the purpose of others remains unclear.

Initial estimates suggested an average population of between 5,000 and 7,000. However, more recent work using revised ideas of the distribution of residential buildings, and employing archaeological and ethnographic data exploring building use, suggests that between 600 and 800 people would have lived at Çatalhöyük East during an average year during the Middle phase (6700–6500 BC). Genetic studies published during 2025 indicate that the social organisation began with a culture organised along matrilocality and matrilineality and that the households passed from mother to daughter.

The sites were set up as large numbers of buildings clustered together. Households looked to their neighbours for help, trade, and possible marriage for their children. The inhabitants lived in mudbrick houses that were crammed together in an aggregate structure. No footpaths or streets were used between the dwellings, which were clustered in a honeycomb-like maze. Most were accessed by holes in the ceiling and doors on the side of the houses, with doors reached by ladders and stairs. The rooftops were effectively streets. The ceiling openings also served as the only source of ventilation, allowing smoke from the houses' open hearths and ovens to escape.

Houses had plaster interiors accessed by squared-off timber ladders or steep stairs. These were usually on the south wall of the room, as were cooking hearths and ovens. The main rooms contained raised platforms that may have been used for a range of domestic activities. Typical houses contained two rooms for everyday activity, such as cooking and crafting. All interior walls and platforms were plastered to a smooth finish. Ancillary rooms were used as storage, and were accessed through low openings from main rooms.

All rooms were kept scrupulously clean. Archaeologists identified very little rubbish in the buildings, finding middens outside the ruins, with sewage and food waste, as well as significant amounts of ash from burning wood, reeds, and animal dung. In good weather, many daily activities may also have taken place on the rooftops, which may have formed a plaza. In later periods, large communal ovens appear to have been built on these rooftops. Over time, houses were renewed by partial demolition and rebuilding on a foundation of rubble, which was how the mound was gradually built up. As many as eighteen levels of settlement have been uncovered.

As a part of ritual life, the people of Çatalhöyük buried their dead within the village. Human remains have been found in pits beneath the floors and especially beneath hearths, the platforms within the main rooms, and beds. Early burials feature closely related families, but burials later in the site's history feature more unrelated individuals, suggesting a change over time in the structure of households. Bodies were tightly flexed before burial and were often placed in baskets or wound and wrapped in reed mats. Disarticulated bones in some graves suggest that bodies may have been exposed in the open air for a time before the bones were gathered and buried. In some cases, graves were disturbed, and the individual's head removed from the skeleton. These heads may have been used in rituals, as some were found in other areas of the community. In a woman's grave, spinning whorls were recovered and in a man's grave, stone axes. Some skulls were plastered and painted with ochre to recreate faces, a custom more characteristic of Neolithic sites in Syria and Jericho than of sites closer by. A sex-based divide was apparent in burial painting. Male bodies were decorated with cinnabar, and female bodies were associated with azurite and malachite pigment.

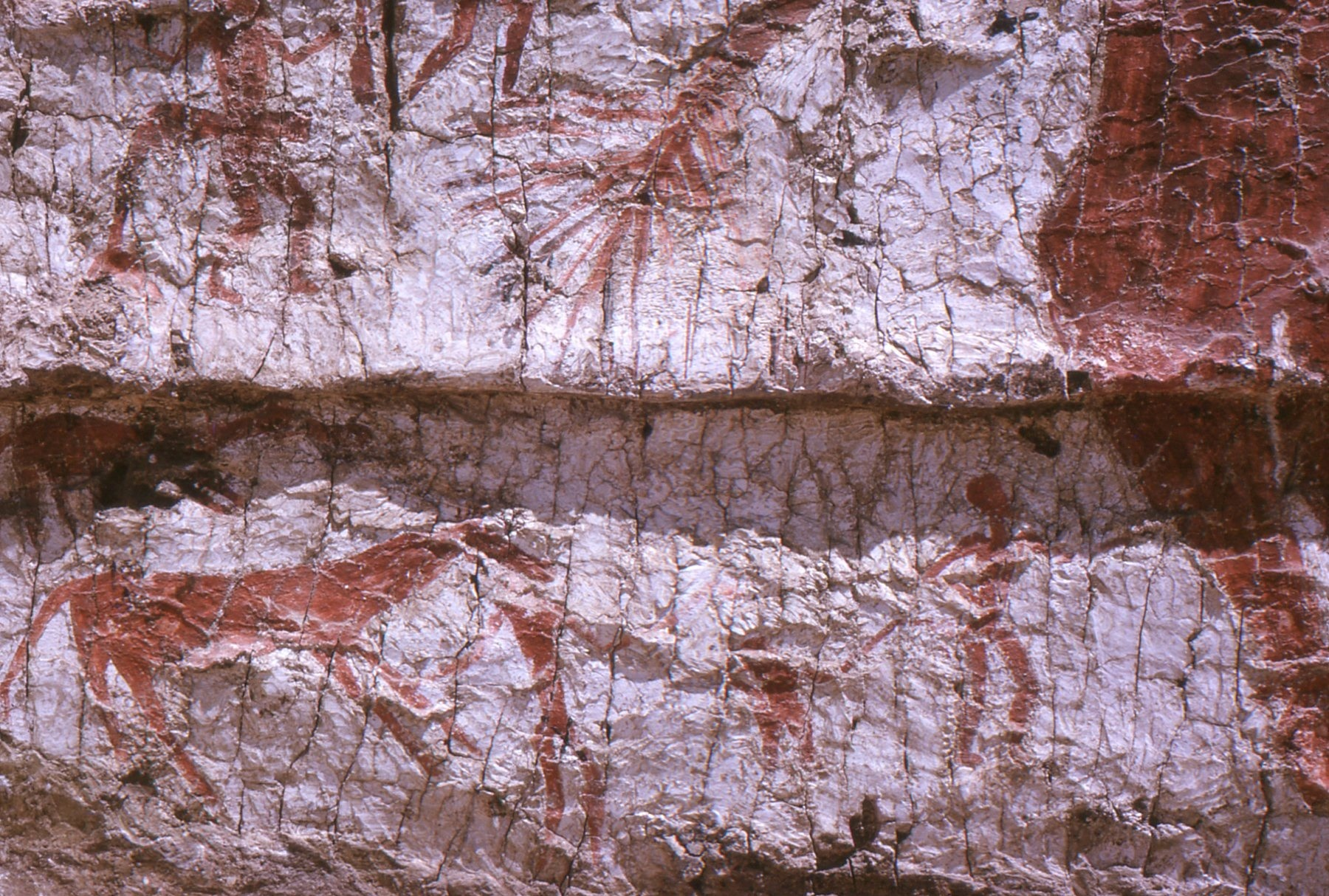
Detail of the mural showing the hind part of the aurochs, a deer and hunters

Vivid murals and figurines are found throughout the settlement on interior and exterior walls. Distinctive clay figurines of women, notably the Seated Woman of Çatalhöyük, have been found in the upper levels of the site. Although no identifiable temples have been found, the graves, murals, and figurines suggest that the people of Çatalhöyük had a religion rich in symbols. Rooms with concentrations of these items may have been shrines or public meeting areas. Predominant images include men with erect phalluses, hunting scenes, red images of the now extinct aurochs (wild cattle) and stags, and vultures swooping down on headless figures. Relief figures are carved on walls, such as of lionesses facing one another.

Heads of animals, especially of cattle, were mounted on walls. A painting of the village, with the twin mountain peaks of Mount Hasan in the background, is frequently cited as the world's oldest map, and the first landscape painting. However, some archaeologists question this interpretation. Stephanie Meece, for example, argues that it is more likely a painting of a leopard skin instead of a volcano, and a decorative geometric design instead of a map.

== Religion ==
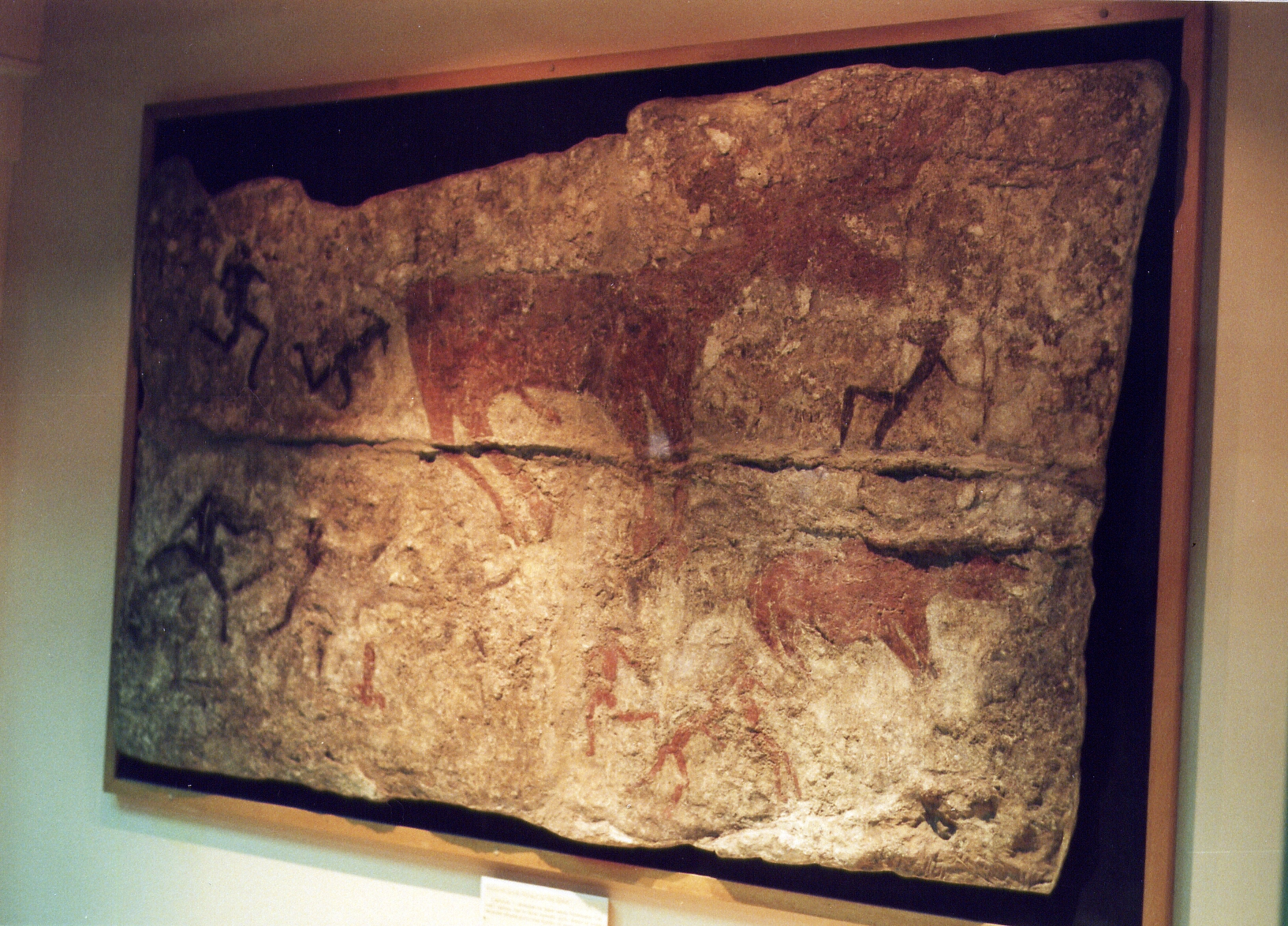
Mural, Museum of Anatolian Civilisations

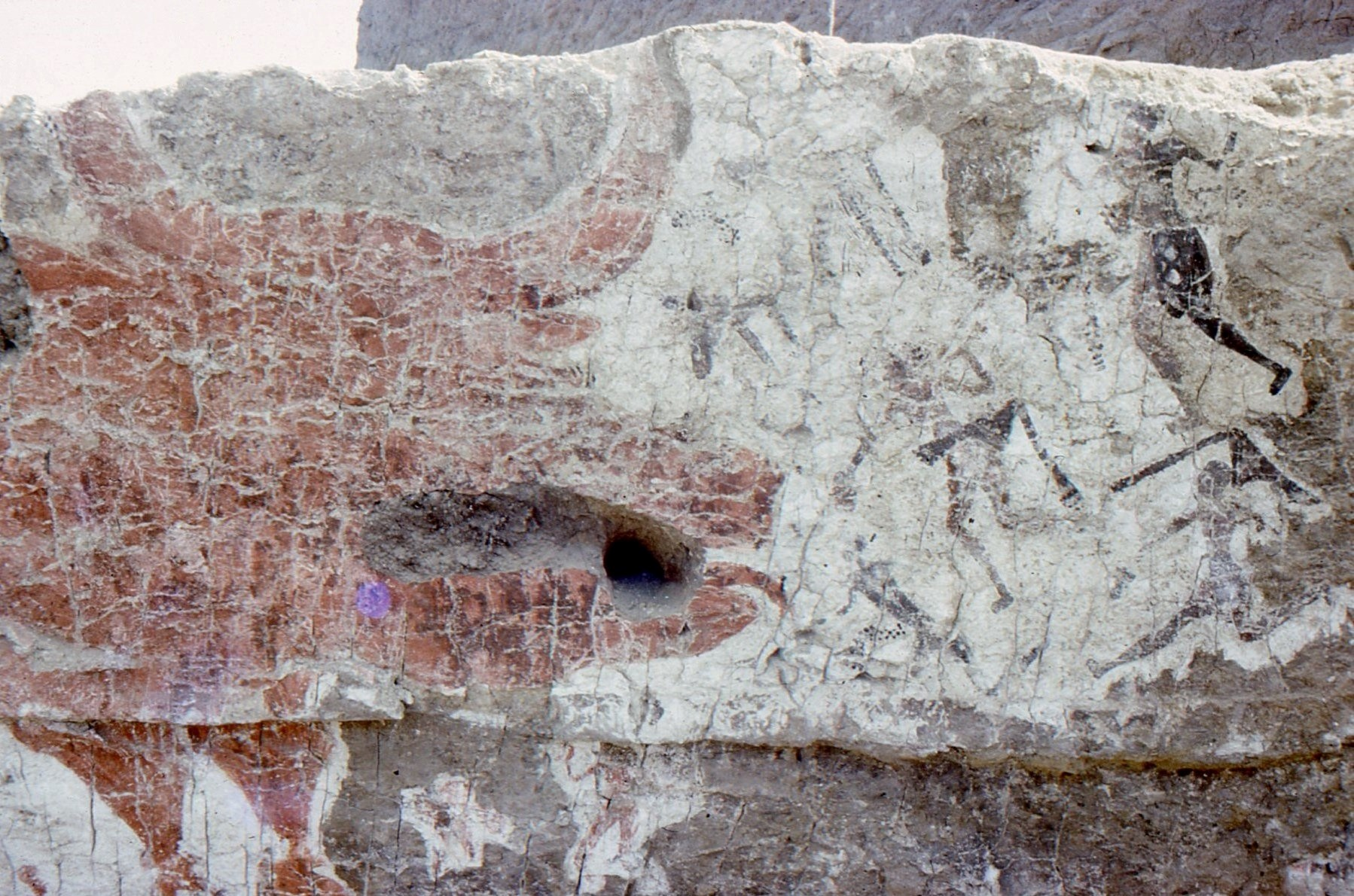
Neolithic hunters attacking an aurochs, Museum of Anatolian Civilisations

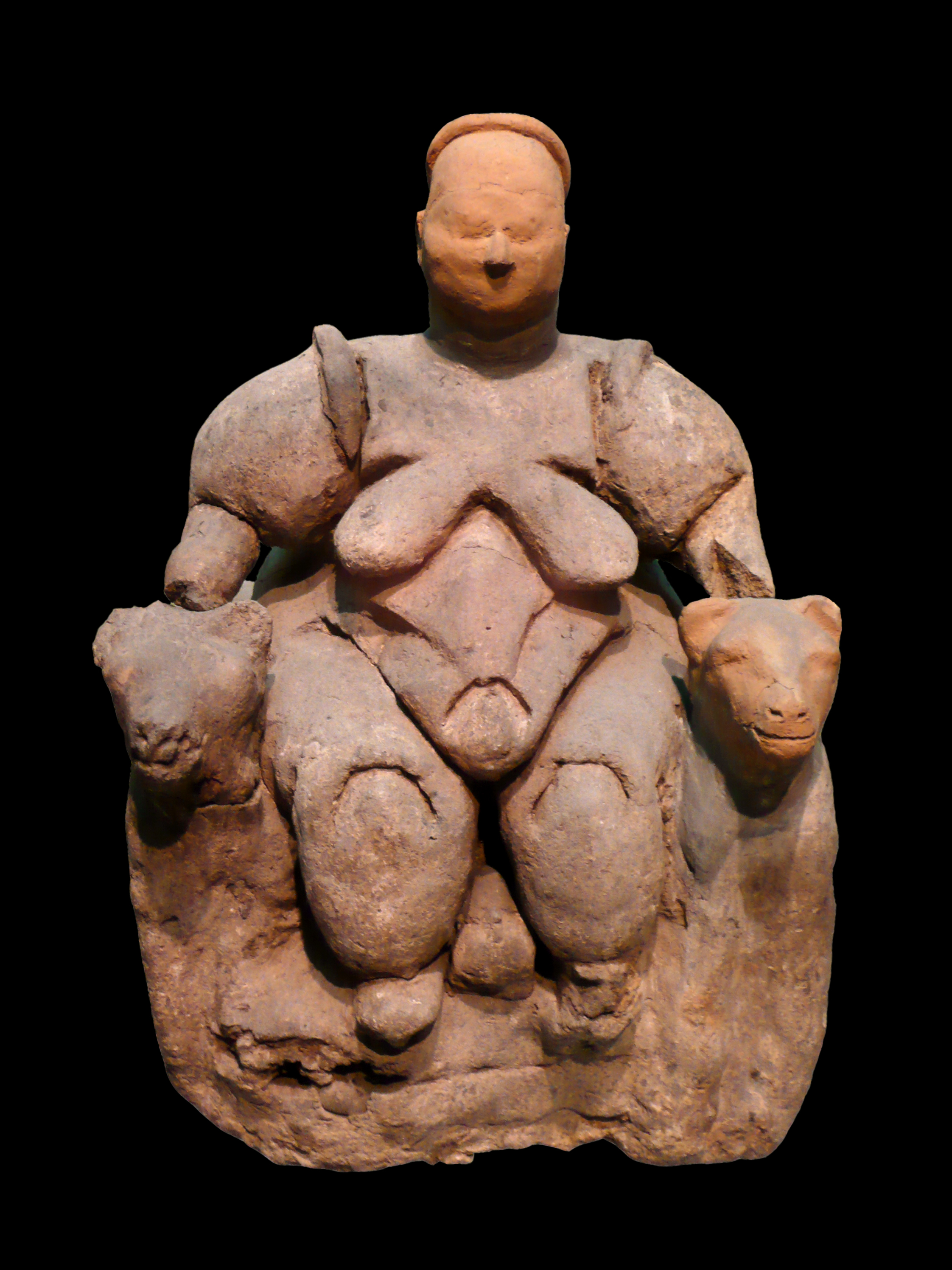
Statue of Seated Woman of Çatalhöyük flanked by two leopards

A feature of Çatalhöyük are its female figurines. Mellaart, the original excavator, argued that these carefully made figurines, carved and moulded from marble, blue and brown limestone, schist, calcite, basalt, alabaster, and clay, represented a female deity. Although a male deity existed as well, "statues of a female deity far outnumber those of the male deity, who moreover, does not appear to be represented at all after Level VI". To date, eighteen levels have been identified. These figurines were found primarily in areas Mellaart believed to be shrines. The stately goddess seated on a throne flanked by two lionesses was found in a grain bin, which Mellaart suggests might have been a means of ensuring the harvest or protecting the food supply.

Whereas Mellaart excavated nearly two hundred buildings in four seasons, the current excavator, Ian Hodder, spent an entire season excavating one building alone. Hodder and his team, in 2004 and 2005, began to believe that the patterns suggested by Mellaart were false. They found one similar figurine, but the vast majority did not imitate the Mother Goddess style that Mellaart suggested. Instead of a Mother Goddess culture, Hodder points out that the site gives little indication of a matriarchy or patriarchy.

There are full breasts on which the hands rest, and the stomach is extended in the central part. There is a hole in the top for the head which is missing. As one turns the figurine around one notices that the arms are very thin, and then on the back of the figurine one sees a depiction of either a skeleton or the bones of a very thin and depleted human. The ribs and vertebrae are clear, as are the scapulae and the main pelvic bones. The figurine can be interpreted in a number of ways – as a woman turning into an ancestor, as a woman associated with death, or as death and life conjoined. It is possible that the lines around the body represent wrapping rather than ribs. Whatever the specific interpretation, this is a unique piece that may force us to change our views of the nature of Çatalhöyük society and imagery. Perhaps the importance of female imagery was related to some special role of the female in relation to death as much as to the roles of mother and nurturer.

In an article in the Turkish Daily News, Hodder denied that Çatalhöyük was a matriarchal society, saying "When we look at what they eat and drink and at their social statues, we see that men and women had the same social status. There was a balance of power. Another example is the skulls found. If one's social status was of high importance in Çatalhöyük, the body and head were separated after death. The number of female and male skulls found during the excavations is almost equal." In another article in the Hürriyet Daily News Hodder is reported to say "We have learned that men and women were equally approached".

Hodder said in a September 2009 report on the discovery of around 2000 figurines:

Çatalhöyük was excavated in the 1960s in a methodical way, but not using the full range of natural science techniques that are available to us today. Sir James Mellaart, who excavated the site in the 1960s, came up with all sorts of ideas about the way the site was organised and how it was lived in and so on ... We've now started working there since the mid-1990s and come up with very different ideas about the site. One of the most obvious examples of that is that Çatalhöyük is perhaps best known for the idea of the mother goddess. But our work more recently has tended to show that, in fact, there is very little evidence of a mother goddess and very little evidence of some sort of female-based matriarchy. That's just one of the many myths that the modern scientific work is undermining.

Lynn Meskell explained that while the original excavations had found only 200 figures, the new excavations had uncovered 2,000 figures, most of which depicted animals, and fewer than 5% of the figurines depicted women.

Estonian folklorist Uku Masing has suggested as early as in 1976, that Çatalhöyük was probably a hunting and gathering religion and the Mother Goddess figurine did not represent a female deity. He implied that perhaps a longer period of time was needed to develop symbols for agricultural rites. His theory was developed in the paper "Some remarks on the mythology of the people of Catal Hüyük".

== Economy ==
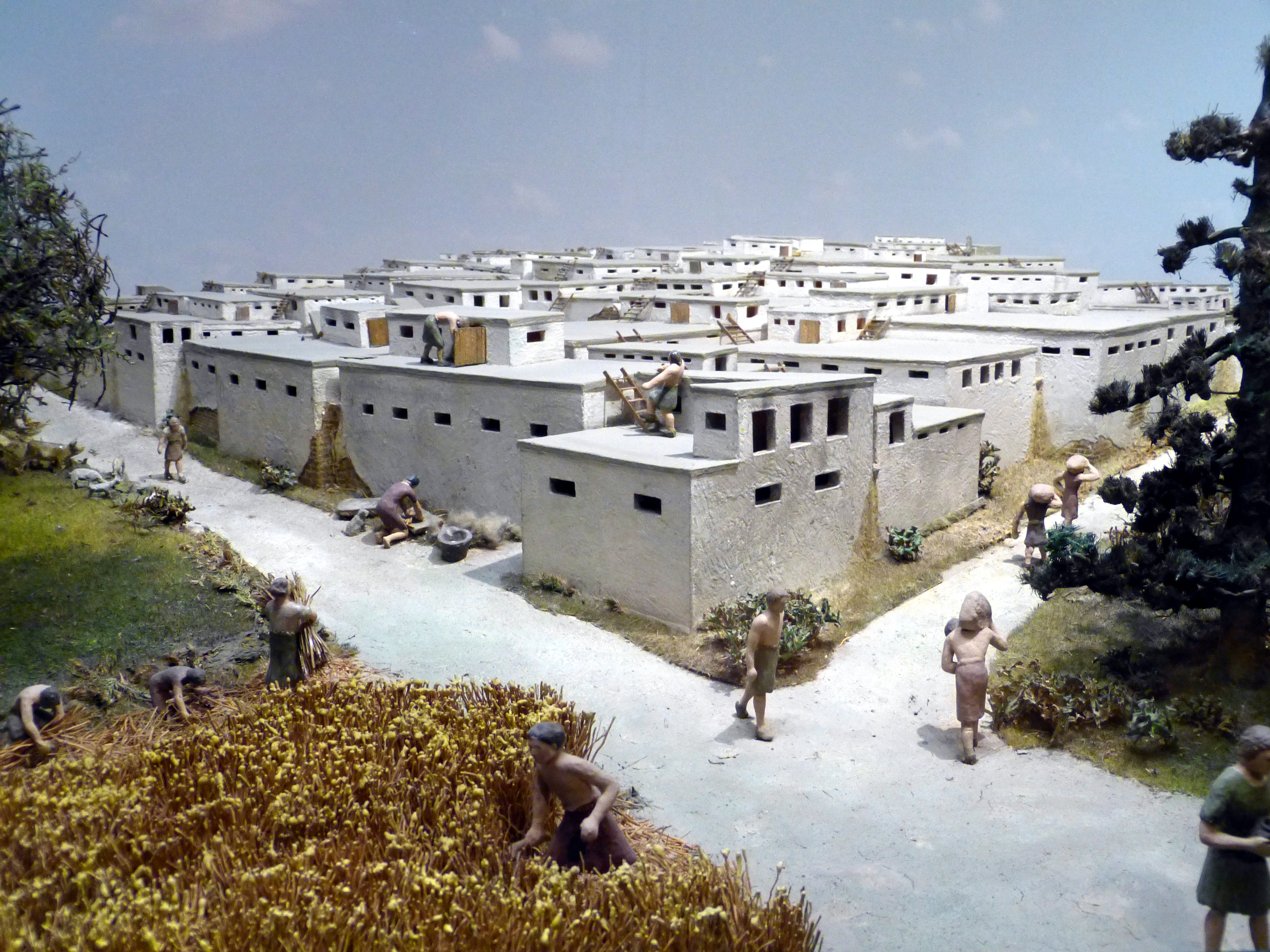
Model of the neolithic settlement of Çatalhöyük, c. 7300 BC

=== Organization ===
Çatalhöyük has strong evidence of an egalitarian society, as no houses with distinctive features (belonging to royalty or religious hierarchy for example) have been found so far. The most recent investigations also reveal little social distinction based on gender, with men and women receiving equivalent nutrition and seeming to have equal social status, as typically found in Paleolithic cultures. Children observed domestic areas. They learned how to perform rituals and how to build or repair houses by watching the adults make statues, beads, and other objects. Çatalhöyük's spatial layout may be due to the close kin relations exhibited amongst the people. It can be seen, in the layout, that the people were "divided into two groups who lived on opposite sides of the town, separated by a gully." Furthermore, because no nearby towns were found from which marriage partners could be drawn, "this spatial separation must have marked two intermarrying kinship groups." This would help explain how a settlement so early on would become so large.

Pottery and obsidian tools appear to have been major industries; obsidian tools were probably both used and also traded for items such as Mediterranean sea shells and flint from Syria. Noting the lack of hierarchy and economic inequality, historian and anti-capitalist author Murray Bookchin has argued that Çatalhöyük was an early example of anarcho-communism. Conversely, a 2014 paper argues that the picture of Çatalhöyük is more complex and that while there seemed to have been an egalitarian distribution of cooking tools and some stone tools, unbroken quern-stones and storage units were more unevenly distributed. Private possessions existed but shared tools also existed. It was also suggested that Çatalhöyük was becoming less egalitarian, with greater inter-generational wealth transmission.

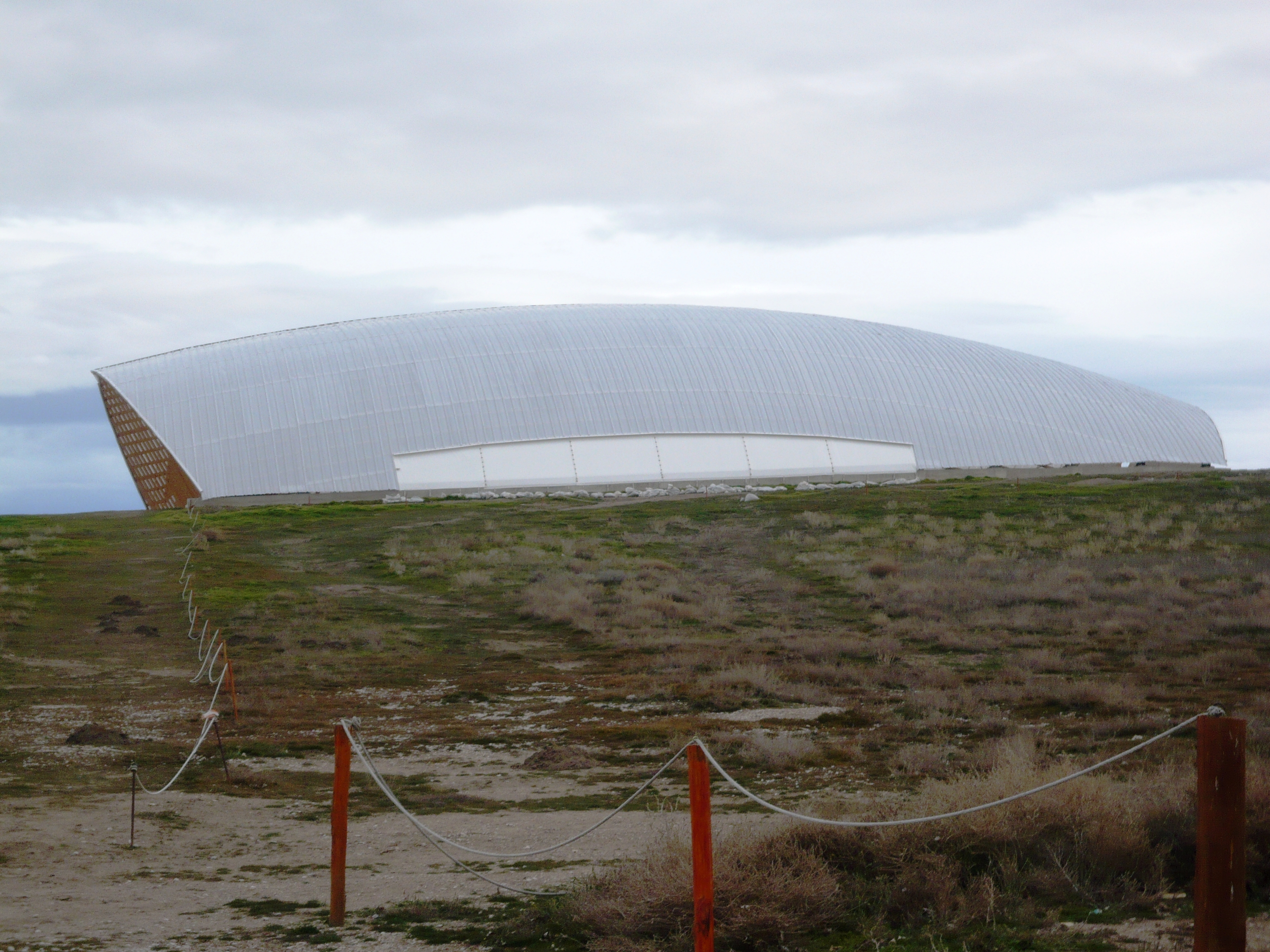
Protective roof of the archaeological site

=== Agriculture ===
In the upper levels of the site, it becomes apparent that the people of Çatalhöyük were honing skills in agriculture and the domestication of animals. Samples of early grains present in the Eastern Mound indicate cultivation of a variety of domesticated wheat species, with the different varieties of crop bolstering food supplies against crop failure. Female figurines have been found within bins used for storage of cereals, such as wheat and barley, and the figurines are presumed to be of a deity protecting the grain. Peas were also grown, and almonds, pistachios, and fruit were harvested from trees in the surrounding hills. Bread and porridge were prepared, and remains of dome ovens are present at early layers of the site.

Remains of cattle and sheep are present at the site, and evidence of animal penning and dung remains indicates some degree of domestication or management of these animals. Proteins recovered on ceramic remains show that dairy products like cow milk were consumed at the Western Mound. Alongside domestication, hunting continued to be a major source of food for the community, including fish, birds, and smaller mammals like foxes and hares.

== Museum ==
In 2023, an information and visitor centre developed by Konya Metropolitan Municipality opened at the site. Its exhibition halls feature interactive displays in Turkish and English covering the settlement's environment, architecture and daily life during the Neolithic period.

== See also ==
- Körtiktepe
- Göbekli Tepe
- Karahan Tepe
- Boncuklu Höyük
- Cities of the ancient Near East
- Cucuteni–Trypillian culture
- Kamyana Mohyla
- List of largest cities throughout history
- List of Stone Age art
- Neolithic Revolution
- Old Europe (archaeology)
- Sacred bull
- Venus figurines
