= Anitta text =

Oldest known text in an Indo-European language

The Anitta text, also known as Deeds of Anitta, is the oldest known text in the Hittite language, and the oldest known text in an Indo-European language overall. It is said to have been authored by King Anitta. It is dated to 1700 BCE.

It is considered by Alfonso Archi as originally written in Akkadian language and Old Assyrian script, at the time Anitta ruled from Kanesh, when Assur colonies were still in Anatolia. This text seems to represent a cuneiform record of Anitta's inscriptions at Kanesh too, perhaps compiled by Hattusili I, one of the earliest Hittite kings of Hattusa.

It also indicates that Anitta's father conquered Neša (Kanesh, Kültepe), which became an important city within the kingdom of Kuššara.

During his own reign, Anitta defeated Huzziya, the last recorded king of Zalpuwa, and the Hattic king Piyusti and then conquered his capital at the site of the future Hittite capital of Hattusa. He then destroyed the city, sowed the ground with weeds, and laid a curse on the site.

Anitta, Son of Pithana, King of Kussara, speak! He was dear to the Stormgod of Heaven, and when he was dear to the Stormgod of Heaven, the king of Nesa [verb broken off] to the king of Kussara. The king of Kussara, Pithana, came down out of the city in force, and he took the city of Nesa in the night by force. He took the King of Nesa captive, but he did not do any evil to the inhabitants of Nesa; instead, he made them mothers and fathers. After my father, Pithana, I suppressed a revolt in the same year. Whatever lands rose up in the direction of the sunrise, I defeated each of the aforementioned.

Previously, Uhna, the king of Zalpuwas, had removed our Sius from the city of Nesa to the city of Zalpuwas. But subsequently, I, Anittas, the Great King, brought our Sius back from Zalpuwas to Nesa. But Huzziyas, the king of Zalpuwas, I brought back alive to Nesa. The city of Hattusas [tablet broken] contrived. And I abandoned it. But afterwards, when it suffered famine, my goddess, Halmasuwiz, handed it over to me. And in the night I took it by force; and in its place, I sowed weeds. Whoever becomes king after me and settles Hattusas again, may the Stormgod of Heaven smite him!
