= Pitḫana =

Pithana

King of Kussara
- Reign: c. 1727 - c. 1700 BC
- Successor: Anitta
- Died: c. 1700 BC
- Issue: Anitta

Pitḫana (Pythanas; died c. 1700 BC) was the King of Kussara in Central Anatolia during the late Middle Bronze IIA (late 18th century BC). His dynasty laid the foundation and was a forerunner of the future Old Hittite Kingdom (Hittite).

== Reign ==
=== Samsu-Iluna of Babylon ===
Pithana has been suggested to be a contemporary of Samsu-Iluna of Babylon. At Tell al-Rimah (Qaṭṭarā), a seal was discovered belonging to Ilī-Samas, servant of Pithana. Pithana was possibly the king of Kussara. A sealed tablet by Ilī-Samas (OBTR 317) was dated to the eponym of Uṣur-ša-Aššur (KEL G 131), corresponding to Year 22/23 of Samsu-iluna of Babylon around 1727 BC.

=== Conquest of Kanesh ===
Following the death of Shamshi-Adad I around 1776 BC, the Assyrian Trade Network in Anatolia fell apart. With the death of Hammurabi of Babylon around 1750 BC, two great powers of trade declined within a short period of time affecting demand/supply along the trade routes into Anatolia. While Kanesh (Level IB) had been a powerful trade center in the first part of the Middle Bronze IIA (c. 1820-1750 BC), the second part of MB IIA (c. 1750-1630 BC) saw its decline. The economic downturn caused both political turmoil and power shifts in Central Anatolia. Kanesh had already been raided by Uḫna of Zalpuwa, who took the statue of the god Siusum from Nesa to Zalpuwa. Pithana of Kussara was one petty king who exploited this to expand his power and territory, while his son Anitta brought the statue back to Kanesh.

Most of the possible history of Pitḫana comes from the Text of King Anitta (CTH 1) which is thought to have been written well after the fact in the time of Hittite ruler Ḫattušili I (c. 1650–1620 BC). Pitḫana is best known for the Conquest of Kanesh, heart of the Assyrian trading colonies network in Anatolia, and core of the Hittite-speaking territories. Dendrochronology indicates, based on the timber from the "Warshama Palace" and associated structures, that Kanesh Level Ib period lasted until roughly 1719 BC.

=== Succession ===
He was succeeded by his son, Anitta, who is best known for conquering Hattusa, the future Hittite capital, and memorializing his achievement in Hittite.

== See also ==
- History of the Hittites

| Preceded by | King of Kussara c. 1728 - c. 1700 BC | Succeeded by Anitta |
