= İkiztepe =

Archaeological site in Turkey

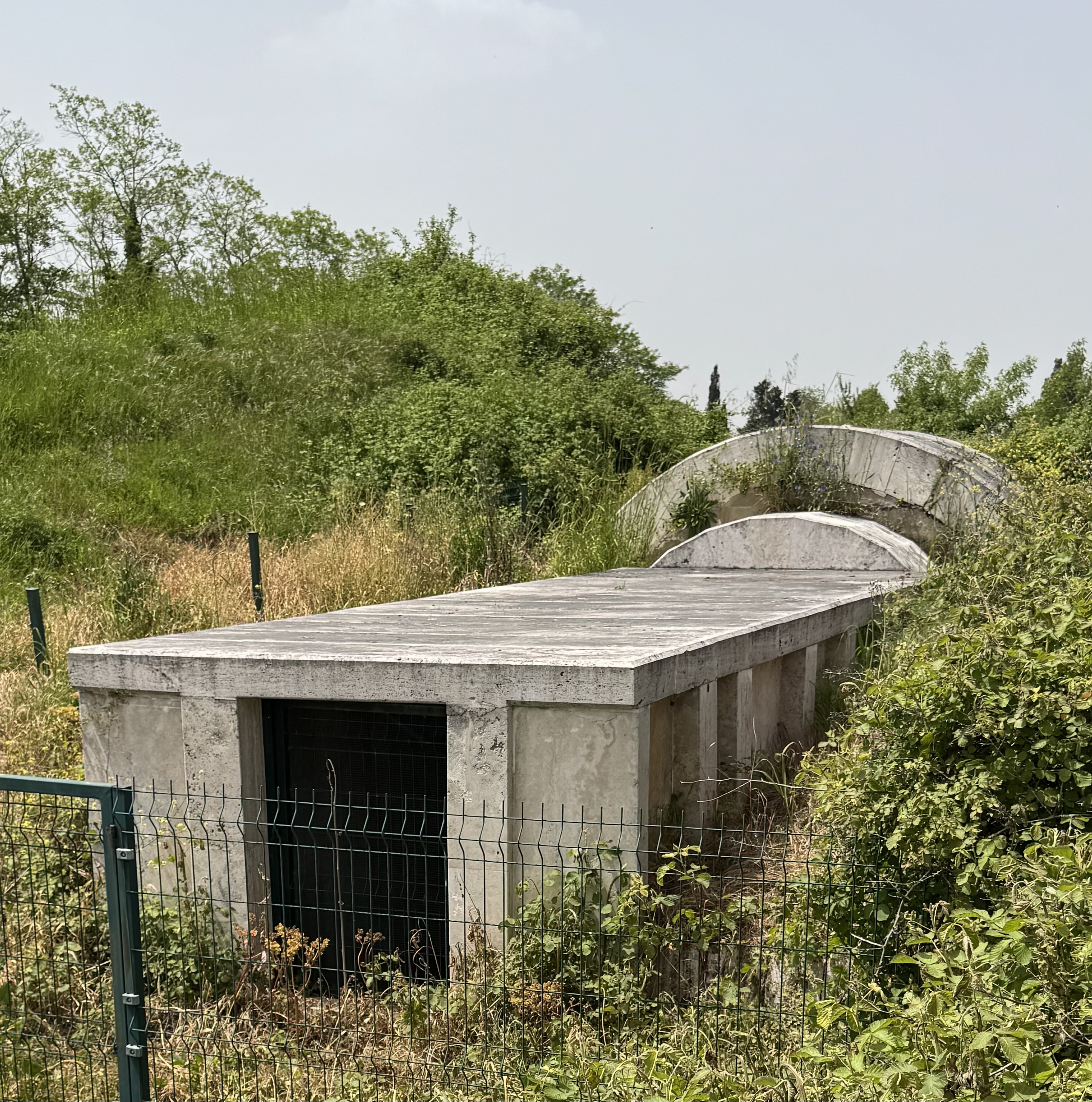
- Interactive map of İkiztepe

İkiztepe is an archaeological excavation site at Bafra, Turkey in the Kızılırmak delta, near the Black Sea coast.

== History ==
=== Early Bronze Age ===
Although İkiztepe means "twin mounds" in Turkish, the site contains four mounds and a burial ground amidst those. İkiztepe II mound contains the earliest findings. Most of the findings are dated to the Early Bronze Age, but the earliest finds date back to possibly the sixth millennium BCE. Finds from İkiztepe exhibit similarities to material of the same age found elsewhere in Anatolia. There are also parallels with findings from Eastern Europe. Among the artifacts found are pottery, metalworks and spindle whorls. According to one theory, the Bosphorus might have been blocked temporarily during the Late Chalcolithic to Early Bronze Ages, exposing a wider shoreline at the coast of the Black Sea, making it possible to easily travel from Varna to İkiztepe region.

Ikiztepe is located very close to both copper and arsenic deposits. Many high quality arsenical copper items were found here. There are rich arsenic ores at the Duragan mine nearby which were used to make arsenical copper alloys. Duragan arsenic mines were in use for a very long time, and they were even commented upon by the ancient geographer Strabo.

The large amount of textile materials (spindle whorls) found in the site may indicate sailing activity.

690 skeletons were found.

== Excavations ==
The excavations in İkiztepe started in 1974 and continued intermittently into the 21st century.

== Theories ==
The Hittite city of Zalpuwa is sometimes associated with İkiztepe. However, this identification is not certain.

== See also ==
Asarkale
