= Huzziya =

King of Zalpuwa

Huzziya was the last recorded king of Zalpuwa. He was captured by Anitta the Hittite king of Kussara. Anitta had been confronted with what appears to have been a military alliance of states stretching southwards from Zalpa, an alliance in which Piyusti, the king of Hatti, and Huzziya, the king of Zalpa, played leading roles.

== Biography ==
Huzziya seems to have become a vassal of the Hittite king Anitta, as Anitta claimed to have retrieved the god of Neša from Zalpuwa and returned it to Neša, before Huzziya revolted and participated in a grand coalition against Anitta's forces. He is attested for in the Anitta Text, which records, “…all the lands from Zalpuwa by the Sea. Formerly Uḫna, King of Zalpuwa, carried off our god from Neša to Zalpuwa. Later I, Anitta, Great King, carried back our god from Zalpuwa to Neša. I brought Ḫuzziya, King of Zalpuwa, alive to Neša. Anitta triumphantly declared that he had made “the sea of Zalpuwa (the Black Sea) my boundary [to the north].”

Huzziya may have been an ancestor and possibly grandfather of Huzziya I, Hittite king of the Old Kingdom (c. 1530–1525 BC).
