= Uḫna =

King of Zalpuwa

Uḫna was a king of the ancient Anatolian city of Zalpuwa during the 18th century BC, middle chronology, who conquered the Hittite city of Neša. According to the Text of Anitta (KBo 3.22), he brought the statue of the god Siusum (Note: Harry A. Hoffner and Craig Melchert suggest this is not the proper name of a god but simply means "our deity" in A grammar of the Hittite language (1st ed.). Winona Lake (Ind.): Eisenbrauns. 2008. p. 138n9. ISBN 978-1-57506-119-1.) from Neša to Zalpuwa. Several years later king Anitta brought this statue back to Neša.
