= Tell Hammam et-Turkman =

- Location within Syria Location within Near East
- 36°28′56″N 39°03′25″E
- Type: tell
- Location: Syria
- Region: Raqqa Governorate

Site notes
- Height: 45 metre
- Length: 500 metre
- Width: 500 metre
- Excavation dates: 1981; 1982; 1984; 1986; 1988; 1992; 1995; 1998; 2001
- Archaeologists: Maurits van Loon, Diederik Meijer

Tell Hammam et-Turkman is an ancient Near Eastern tell site located in the Balikh River valley in Raqqa Governorate, northern Syria, not far from the Tell Sabi Abyad site and around 80 km north of the city of Raqqa. The Tell is located on the left bank of the Balikh and has a diameter of 500 m and is 45 m high. 500 m north is the modern village of Damešliyye.

Based on remote sensing the site has now been systematically looted using bulldozers.

== History ==
The earliest occupation of the site was northern Ubaid period (Period IV) with radiocarbon dates between n 4400 and 3600 BC. Significant building occurred up to the point where the site was destroyed in a conflagration radiocarbon dated to 3400 - 3200 BC. This is typically considered the Uruk Period though no Uruk ceramics were found so the situation is unclear. After a period of abandonment the site became active again, only to be violently destroyed at the end of the 3rd Millennium BC. Lesser scale occupation occurred circa 1600 BC.

== Archaeology ==
The site was archaeologically examined by the Universities of Amsterdam and Leiden. Traces of settlement from the pre-Pottery Neolithic to the Roman and Parthian times can be identified. In the 1986 excavations an 8 meter wide city wall with upper chambers was found, surrounding the Early Bronze III-IV city. Radiocarbon samples from those chambers indicated a date of c. 2400 BC. A large high-quality Middle Bronze II building was also found, dated to c. 1750-1550 BC. A total of ten settlement strata can be distinguished. The focus of research activities was on the layers attributable to the Middle Bronze Age. Hammam et-Turkman is also known for a monumental building from the Uruk period. In the strata from 1200 BC a settlement gap for almost a millennium before the place was repopulated as a garrison site.

The site has now been extensively looted both with hand tools and with heavy machinery.

== Name ==
The historical name of the settlement is unknown. The original assumption that it could be the city of Zalpa, known from clay tablets, has not yet been confirmed.

In 1990, J. M. Córdoba had identified Zalpa with Tell Hammam et-Turkman, and this suggestion was considered as possible by French scholars Nele Ziegler and Anne-Isabelle Langlois in 2016, as well as Eva von Dassow in her recent essay published in 2022.

== See also ==
- Cities of the ancient Near East
