= Asarkale =

Ruined fortress in northern Turkey

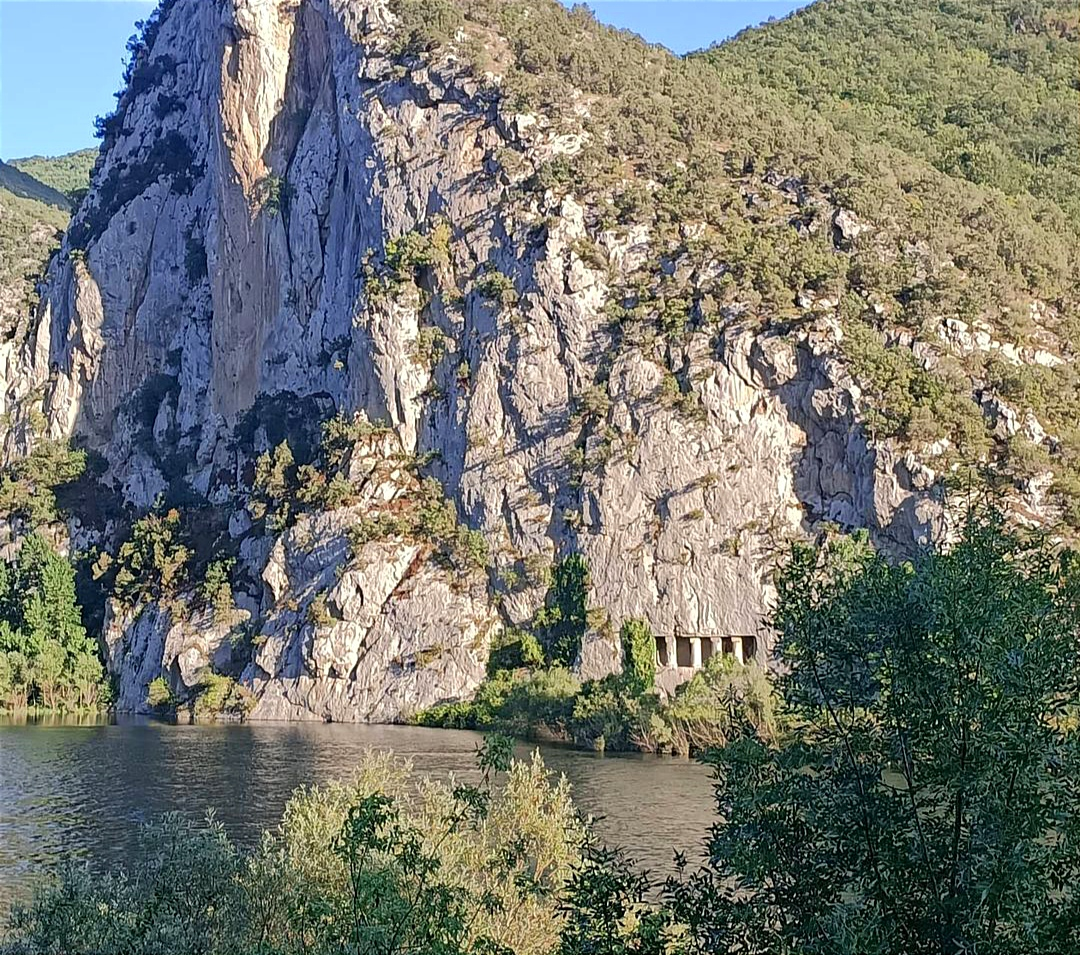
- Interactive map of Asarkale

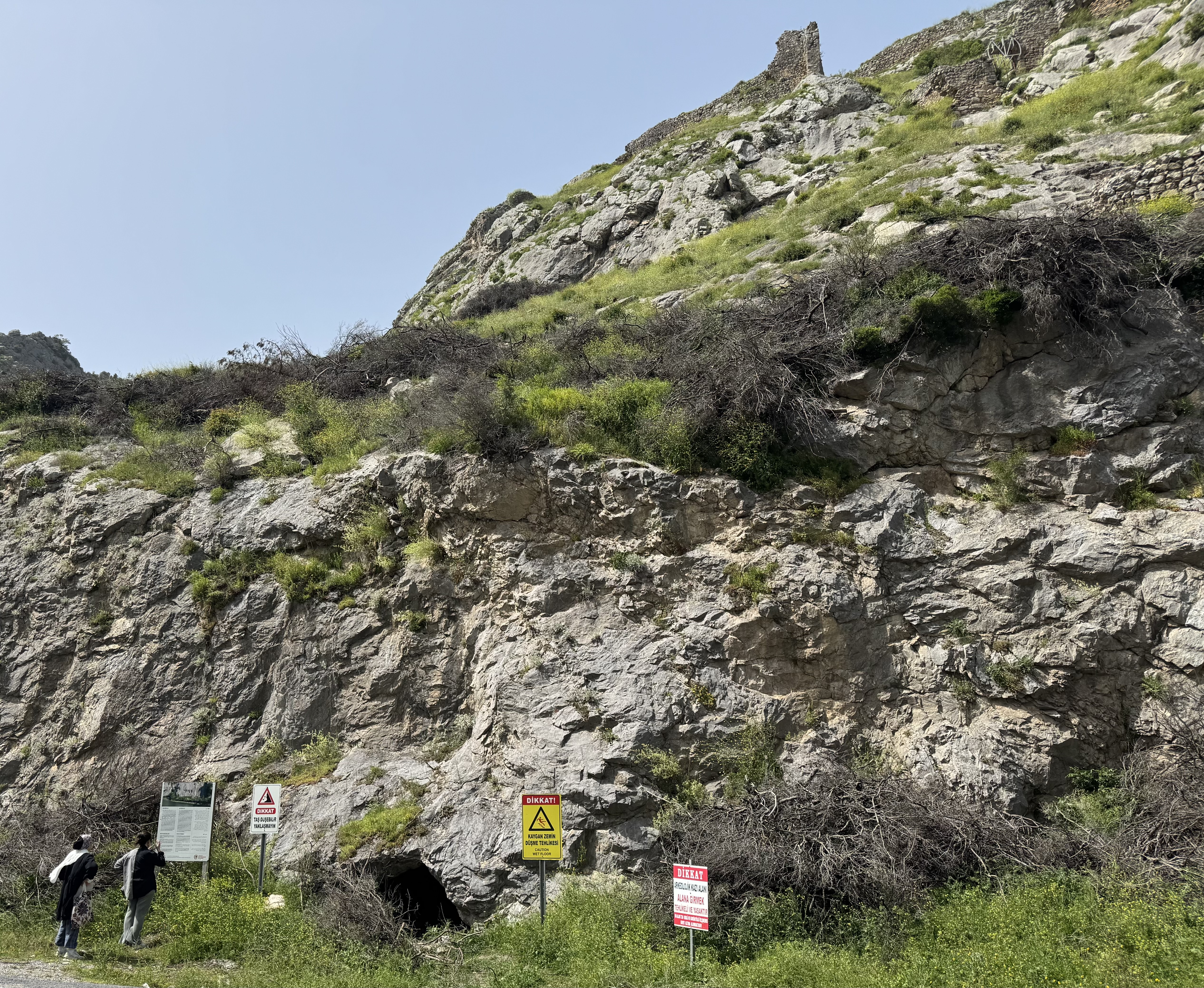
Asarkale ruined fortress in Samsun Province northern Turkey

Asarkale is a ruined fortress 30 km southwest of the Bafra district of Samsun Province in northern Turkey, and there are nearby rock tombs. One of the rock tombs is next to the reservoir of the Derbent Dam on the Kızılırmak River. Asarkale is on a large rock. It is reached by climbing the stairs through a formerly secret tunnel. An excavation was started in 2024 by Ondokuz Mayıs University. Seljuk and Ottoman artefacts have been found, and it is thought that the fortress was used for defense during the Hellenistic Age.
