= Zalpuwa =

Bronze Age city in Anatolia

Zalpa (also called Zalba, Zalpah, Zalpuwa) were ancient regions mentioned in Assyrian, Mari and Hittite records. The toponyms appear in a variety of forms and contexts and likely refer to at least two similarly named regions. They are believed to have been located on the Pontic coast of the Black Sea, along the Euphrates in northern Mesopotamia and along the Balikh river in northern Syria.

== Etymology ==
The etymology is uncertain but the toponyms may have been Sumerian formulaic theophoric names derived from KA.ZAL. The same syllabary is found in the Akkadian toponym ka-zal-lu^{ki} in records of the twenty-second through sixteenth centuries BC, which could explain the presence of multiple forms and uses of the toponyms in the historical record.

== Anatolian Zalpa ==
=== Seeming indirect evidence from Ancient legends ===
Zalpuwa is the setting for an ancient legend about the Queen of Kanesh, which was either composed in or translated into the Hittite language:

"[The Queen] of Kanesh once bore thirty sons in a single year. She said: 'What a horde is this which I have born[e]!' She caulked(?) baskets with fat, put her sons in them, and launched them in the river. The river carried them down to the sea at the land of Zalpuwa. Then the gods took them up out of the sea and reared them. When some years had passed, the queen again gave birth, this time to thirty daughters. This time she herself reared them."

The river at Kanesh (Sarımsaklı Çayı) drains into the Black Sea, which seemingly supported the argument that the city was located near the Black Sea.

=== Hittite connection and Arnuwanda prayer ===
"Zalpuwa" is further mentioned alongside Nerik in Arnuwanda I's prayer. Nerik was a Hattic language speaking city which had fallen to the Kaskians by Arnuwanda's time. This portion of the prayer also mentioned Kammama, which was Kaskian as of the reign of Arnuwanda II. The conclusion until recently, was to locate Zalpuwa in a region of Hattian cities of northern central Anatolia: as were Nerik, Hattusa, and probably Sapinuwa, and Zalpuwa was thought to have been founded by Hattians, like its neighbours.

Around the 18th century BC, Uḫna the king of Zalpuwa invaded Neša, after which the Zalpuwans carried off the city's "Sius" idol. Under Huzziya's reign, the king of Neša, Anitta, invaded Zalpuwa. Anitta took Huzziya captive, and recovered the Sius idol for Neša. Soon after that, Zalpuwa seems to have become culturally and linguistically Hittite.

Arnuwanda's prayer implies that Zalpuwa was laid waste by Kaskians, at the same time that Nerik fell to them, in the early 14th century BC.

=== Identification with archaeological sites ===
The archaeological sites of İkiztepe and Tatlıgöl Höyük on the Kızılırmak Delta near the Black Sea coast have been suggested as possible locations for the Anatolian Zalpuwa. Paşaşeyh Tepesi is an additional candidate.

== Syrian Zalpa ==
In 1990, J. M. Córdoba identified Zalpa with Tell Hammam et-Turkman, on the Balikh river, and this proposal was commented as possible by French scholars Nele Ziegler and Anne-Isabelle Langlois in 2016, as well as Eva von Dassow in her (2022) essay.

The city of Zalpa was formerly equated by scholars with Zalpuwa in Anatolia, located to the north of Ḫattuša near the Black Sea. But the Zalpa mentioned in the Annals of Hattusili I has now been proposed as being at the site of Tilmen Höyük, in the Karasu River Valley south of the Taurus Mountains, which had a palace and temple that were violently destroyed near the end of the Middle Bronze Age II. This North Syrian Zalpa was called Zalwar in Old Babylonian texts. The military exploits of Hattusili I, a Hittite king who reigned in the latter part of the seventeenth century BC, are described both in Hittite and Akkadian in clay tablets, now in the Catalogue of Hittite Texts, excavated in Hattusa, the Hittite capital, and mention that he destroyed the city of Zalpa (written Za-al-pa in Hittite and Za-al-ba-ar in Akkadian).

== See also ==
- Hattusili I
- History of the Hittites
