= Kussara =

Bronze Age kingdom in Anatolia

- c. 1728 BC – c. 1700 BC
- Proposed location of Kussara, bottom right
- Capital: Kanesh
- Demonym: Kussaran
- Government: Absolute monarchy
- Monarch
  - c. 1728 - c. 1700 BC: Pithana
  - c. 1700 BC: Anitta
- History
  - Established: c. 1728 BC
  - Disestablished: c. 1700 BC
- Today part of: Turkey

Kussara (Kuššar or Kuššara) was a Middle Bronze Age kingdom in Anatolia. The kingdom, though apparently important at one time, is mostly remembered today as the origin of the dynasty that would form the Old Hittite Kingdom.

== Location ==
Kussara is occasionally mentioned (as Ku-ša-ra) in the clay tablets of the Assyrian traders in Anatolia, and less often in the early Hittite Kingdom (as KUR URU Ku-uš-ša-ra). It has been equated with the modern Turkish city of Kayseri. Massimo Forlanini imprecisely situated it southeast of Kanesh, but north of Luhuzzadia/Lahu(wa)zzandiya, between Hurama and Tegarama (modern day Gürün). Trevor Bryce imprecisely situated it to "the south-east of the Kizil Irmak basin in the anti-Taurus region, on or near one of the main trade routes from Assyria and perhaps in the vicinity of modern Şar (Comana Cappadocia)".

== Kussaran kings ==
Pithana and his son Anitta, forerunners of the later Hittite kings, are the only two recorded kings of Kussara. Their exploits are known chiefly from the so-called Anitta Text, one of the earliest inscriptions in the Hittite language as yet discovered. Pithana took control over Kanesh (Neša) and its important trade centrum around 1780 BC. The people later revolted against the rule of his son, Anitta, but Anitta crushed the revolt and made Kanesh his capital. Kussara itself, however, appears to have retained ceremonial importance. Anitta also defeated the polities of Zalpuwa and Hattum, after which he took the title of Great King. Most scholars also accept a further king, Labarna I, to be a member of the Kussaran dynasty.

It is notable that Hattusili I, recognized as one of the first Hittite kings, referred to himself as "man of Kussara", although his capital (from which he likely took his name) was Hattusa. Again, Kussara seems even then to have retained some importance, since this was where Hattusili called a council on his own succession.

== Rulers ==
Name	Reign	Lifespan
Pithana	c. 1728 - c. 1700 BC	Died c. 1700 BC
Anitta	c. 1700 BC	

== Economy, language and government ==
The language or dialect of Kussara is neither found nor described in either the Assyrian or Hittite texts, but from the evidence of Old Assyrian trade tablets, it is known that a palace and a karum (Assyrian trade station) existed in the city. The Kings of Kussara became the Kings of Kanesh in the Karum IB period of Kanesh. Hattusili I and Hattusili III mentioned the origins of the Kings of the land of Hatti as Hattusili I styled himself: "man of Kussara . . . Great King Tabarna, Hattusili the Great King, King of the land of Hatti." No other town or land was ever mentioned by a King of Hattusa as the origin of the Kings of Hattusa.

Because the Kings of Kussara and their clan formed the base of the Old Kingdom of the Hittites, the Hittite language (known as 'Nesili' to its speakers after the city of Kanesh or Nesa) was the language of the ruling officials. It is assumed that the language of Kussara was Indo-European, because if it were not, many more non-Indo-European elements would be expected in its apparent successor, Hittite. Harold Melchert concluded in the chapter "Prehistory" of his book The Luwians (2003–17): "Hittite core vocabulary remains Indo-European". The Anitta Text records that when Pithana captured Kanesh, he did no harm to it, but made the inhabitants "his mothers and fathers." Some scholars have taken this unique statement to mean there were cultural and/or ethnic affinities between Kussara and Kanesh.

== Sources ==
- Akurgal, Ekrem (2001). The Hattian and Hittite Civilizations. Ankara: Ministry of Culture. ISBN 978-975-17-2756-5.
- Bachvarova, Mary R. (2010). "Manly Deeds: Hittite Admonitory History and Eastern Mediterranean Didactic Epic". Epic and History. Chichester: John Wiley & Sons. pp. 66–85. ISBN 978-1-4443-1564-6.
- Barjamovic, Gojko (2011). A Historical Geography of Anatolia in the Old Assyrian Colony Period. Copenhagen: Museum Tusculanum Press. ISBN 978-87-635-3645-5.
- Bryce, Trevor R. (2002). Life and Society in the Hittite World. New York: Oxford University Press. ISBN 978-0-19-924170-5.
- Bryce, Trevor R. (2005) [1998]. The Kingdom of the Hittites (2nd revised ed.). New York: Oxford University Press. ISBN 978-0-19-927908-1.
- Bryce, Trevor R. (2009). The Routledge Handbook of the Peoples and Places of Ancient Western Asia: The Near East from the Early Bronze Age to the fall of the Persian Empire. London-New York: Routledge. ISBN 978-1-134-15907-9.
- Gilan, Amir (2010). "Epic and History in Hittite Anatolia: In Search of a Local Hero". Epic and History. Chichester: John Wiley & Sons. pp. 51–65.
- Gilan, Amir (2018). "In Search of a Distant Past: Forms of Historical Consciousness in Hittite Anatolia" (PDF). Anadolu. 44: 1–23.
- Goodnick-Westenholz, Joan (1997). Legends of the Kings of Akkade: The Texts. Winona Lake: Eisenbrauns. ISBN 978-0-931464-85-0.
- Goodnick-Westenholz, Joan (2010). "Historical Events and the Process of Their Transformation in Akkadian Heroic Traditions". Epic and History. Chichester: John Wiley & Sons. pp. 26–50. ISBN 978-1-4443-1564-6.
