= Piyusti =

Hattian king

King of Hattusa
- Reign: c. 1700 BC

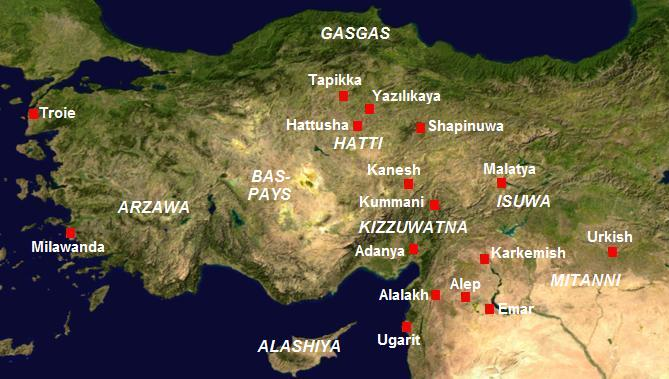
Map showing where Piyusti ruled before he was defeated

Piyusti or Piyušti (fl. c. 1700 BC) was a king of Hattusa during the 18th and/or 17th century BC (short chronology). He is mentioned in the Anitta text as being defeated by Anitta on at least two occasions.

== Anitta and Piyusti ==
In the second encounter, Piyusti and his auxiliary troops were defeated at the town of Šalampa. Later, Anitta was able to storm the city of Hattusa at night after its defenders were weakened by famine. Anitta utterly destroyed and cursed the Hatti capital. The later Hittite kings had to completely rebuild the city.

== See also ==
- History of the Hittites

== Sources ==
Preceded by	King of Hattusa c. 1700 BC	Succeeded by
