= Anitta (king) =

Hittite King of Kussara, Anatolia

King of Kussara
- Reign: c. 1700 BC
- Predecessor: Pithana
- Father: Pithana

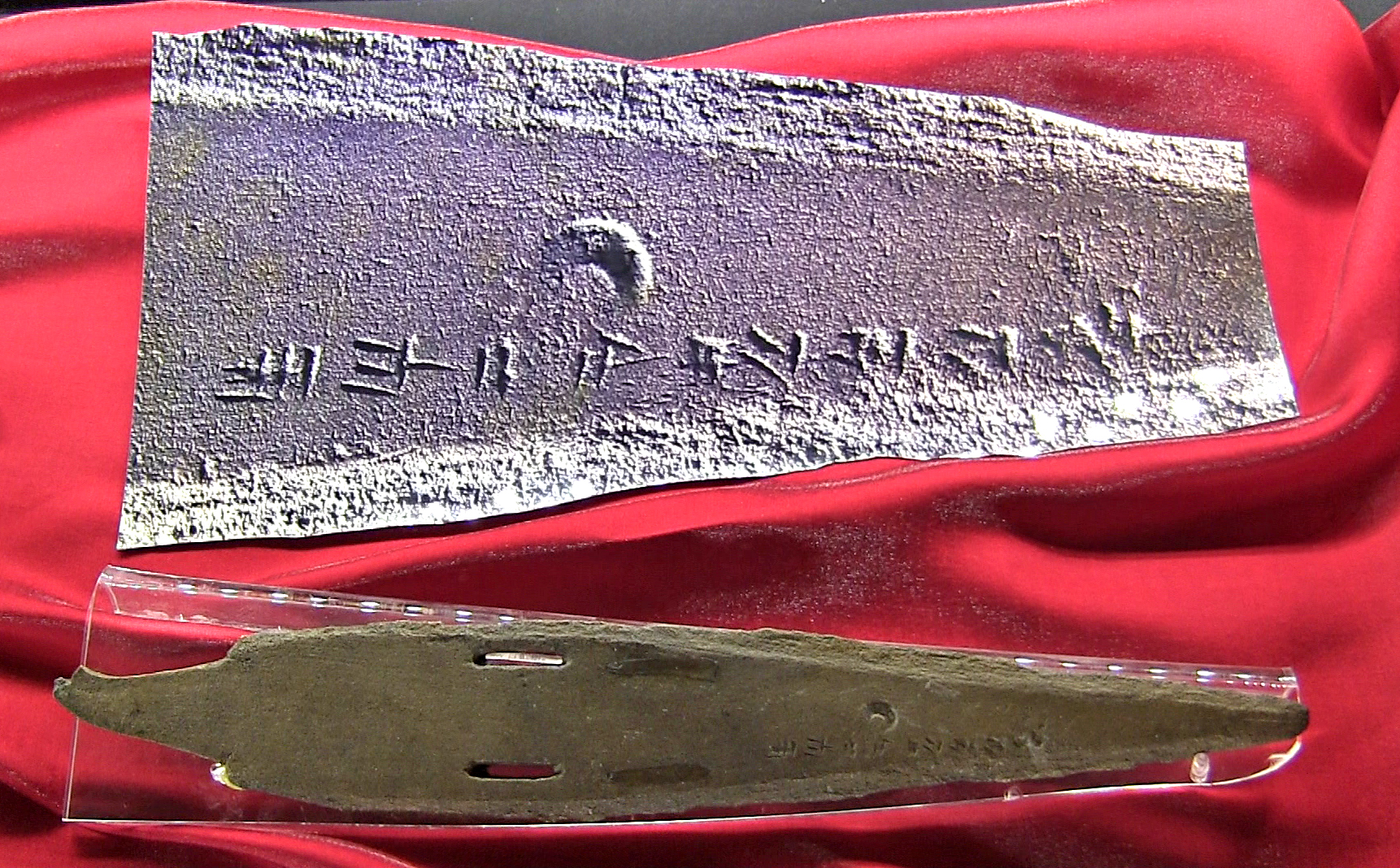
Bronze dagger of king Anitta

Anitta (fl. c. 1700 BC) son of Pitḫana, was the king of Kussara, during the late Middle Bronze IIA. The city has not yet been identified. He is the earliest known ruler to compose a text in Hittite.

== Family ==
Anitta was son of Pitḫana.

The Assyrian Trade Network flourished between Central Anatolia and Upper Mesopotamia in the early MB IIA (c. 1820-1750 BC), especially under Kingdom of Upper Mesopotamia ruler Shamshi-Adad I, cf. Kanesh Karum IB period.

In the late MB IIA (c. 1750-1630 BC), the Assyrian Trade Network collapsed cutting trade from Central Anatolia and Assyria/Babylon. Hammurabi of Babylon had conquered several centers in Upper Mesopotamia, which Samsu-Iluna of Babylon struggled to control against local petty kingdoms rebelling. Pithana was a contemporary of Samsu-Iluna, and apparently tried to maintain trade relations. Locally, political turmoil and economic downturn saw petty kings fight for power and control, with Pithana taking control of the former Assyrian trade hub Kanesh. Anitta continued these policies to expand territorial control by taking neighboring centers to secure trade routes and trade hubs.

== Reign ==
Anitta is variously dated to 1740–1725 BC (middle chronology), or alternatively c. 1730-1715 BC (low middle chronology). However, his father may be associated with Samsu-Iluna of Babylon (c. 1730 BC), pushing the reign of Anitta downward to around the time of 1700 BC. In relative chronology, his reign coincides with the late Middle Bronze IIA (MB IIA c. 1820-1630 BC; late MB IIA 1750-1630 BC).

He is the author of the Anitta text (CTH 1.A, edited in StBoT 18, 1974), the oldest known text in Hittite, also classified as "cushion-shaped" tablet KBo 3.22, being the oldest known text in an Indo-European language altogether. Also known as Deeds of Anitta, it is considered by Alfonso Archi as originally written in Akkadian and Old Assyrian script, at the time Anitta ruled from Kanesh, when Assur colonies were still in Anatolia. This text seems to represent a cuneiform record of Anitta's inscriptions at Kanesh too, perhaps compiled by Hattusili I, one of the earliest Hittite kings of Hattusa.

=== Proclamation of Anitta ===
The Anitta text or Proclamation of Anitta (CTH 1) indicates that Anitta's father conquered Neša (Kanesh, Kültepe), which became an important city within the kingdom of Kussara. During his own reign, Anitta defeated Huzziya, the last recorded king of Zalpuwa, and the Hattic king Piyusti and then conquered his capital at the site of the future Hittite capital of Hattusa. He then destroyed the city, sowed the ground with weeds, and laid a curse on the site.

Anitta, Son of Pithana, King of Kussara, speak! He was dear to the Stormgod of Heaven, and when he was dear to the Stormgod of Heaven, the king of Nesa [verb broken off] to the king of Kussara. The king of Kussara, Pithana, came down out of the city in force, and he took the city of Nesa in the night by force. He took the King of Nesa captive, but he did not do any evil to the inhabitants of Nesa; instead, he made them mothers and fathers. After my father, Pithana, I suppressed a revolt in the same year. Whatever lands rose up in the direction of the sunrise, I defeated each of the aforementioned.

Previously, Uhna, the king of Zalpuwas, had removed our Sius from the city of Nesa to the city of Zalpuwas. But subsequently, I, Anittas, the Great King, brought our Sius back from Zalpuwas to Nesa. But Huzziyas, the king of Zalpuwas, I brought back alive to Nesa. The city of Hattusas [tablet broken] contrived. And I abandoned it. But afterwards, when it suffered famine, my goddess, Halmasuwiz, handed it over to me. And in the night I took it by force; and in its place, I sowed weeds. Whoever becomes king after me and settles Hattusas again, may the Stormgod of Heaven smite him!

=== Kanesh ===
Anitta moved his capital from Kussara to Kanesh (Karum IA).

=== Military campaigns ===
- Campaign against Zalpuwa. Anitta defeated King Huzziya, recovered a cult statue (the "God of Nesha") that had been stolen from Kaneš generations earlier, and brought it back.
- Campaign against Hattusa (North). Anitta fought and defeated Piyušti, the King of Hatti. He famously razed the city to the ground and placed a curse upon it, sowing weeds (sahlu) where the city stood and declaring that anyone who rebuilt it should be "struck by the Storm God of Heaven."
- Campaign against Purushanda (West). When Anitta marched against it, the King of Purushanda chose to surrender without a fight. In a significant act of submission, the king presented Anitta with an iron throne and an iron scepter, symbols of supreme authority in a period when iron was more valuable than gold.
- Ullamma and Harkiuna: Smaller but strategically important cities mentioned in the Anitta Text as being subdued during his northern campaigns.

=== Royal Court ===
His high official, or rabi simmiltim, was named Peruwa.

== Attestations ==
Anitta's name appears on an inscription on a dagger found in Kültepe and also, together with the name of his father, on various Kültepe texts, as well as in later Hittite tradition.

== See also ==
- History of the Hittites

== Notes ==
Preceded by Pithana	King of Kussara c. 1700 BC	Succeeded by
