= Bogazköy Archive =

Collection of texts found on the site of the city of Hattusas

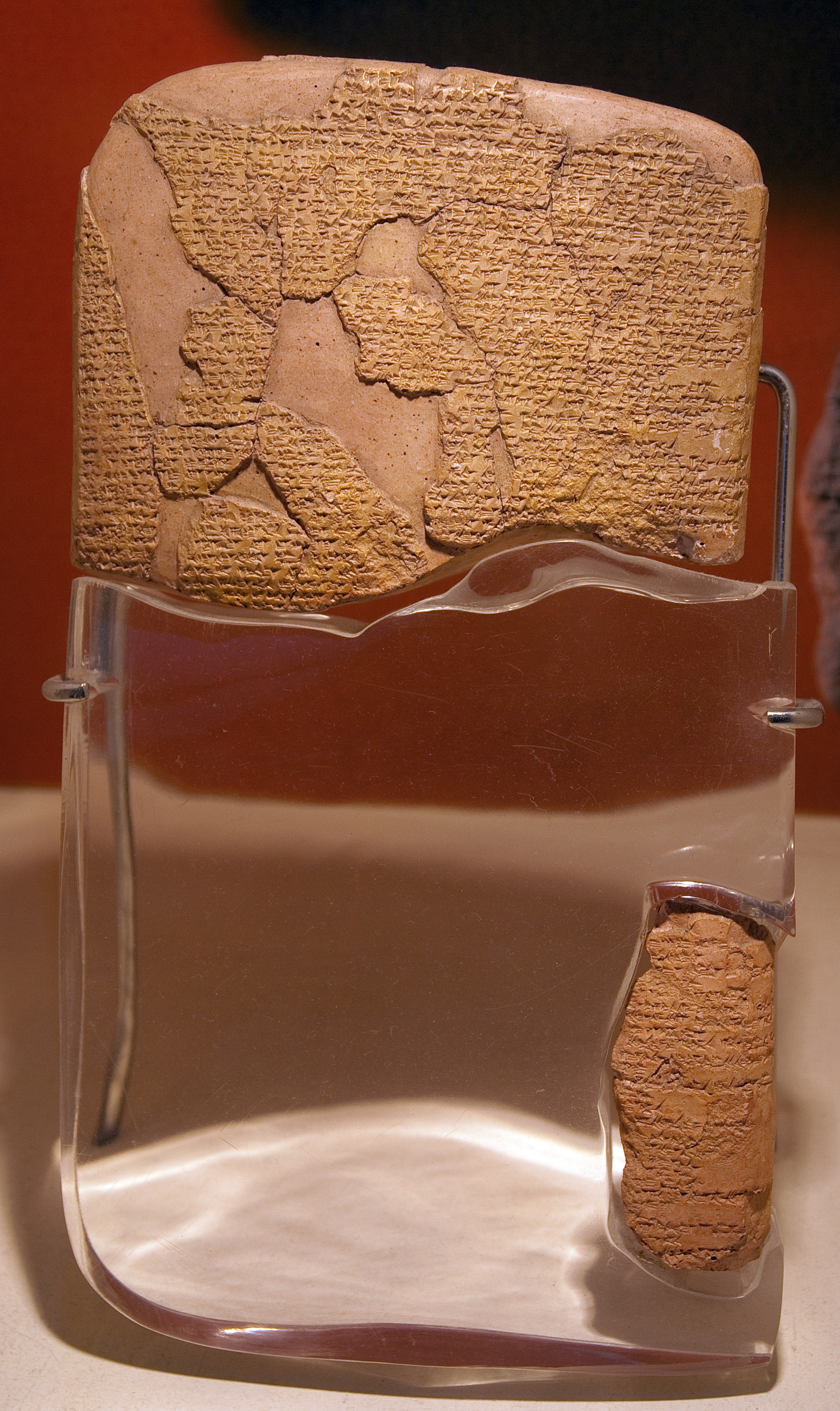
The Treaty of Kadesh tablet

The Bogazkoy archives are a collection of texts found on the site of the capital of the Hittite state, the city of Hattusas (now Bogazkoy in Turkey). They are the oldest extant documents of the state, and they are believed to have been created in the 2nd millennium BC. The archive contains approximately 25,000 tablets.

== Content ==
The archive contains royal annals, treaties, political correspondence, legal texts, inventory texts along with instructions, texts related to administration, mythological texts, and religious texts.

=== Languages ===
Emil Forrer wrote in 1919 of eight languages having been found:

A review of all the Boghazköi fragments has shown that they contain no fewer than eight different languages: besides Sumerian, Akkadian, the language previously designated “Hittite,” which, as we shall see at once, should more correctly be called Kanesian, and Proto-Indo-Aryan, there are Hurrian, Proto-Hattic, Luwian, and Palaic.

In 2023, a tablet in a previously unknown language was found in the archive - this has been subsequently named the Kalašma language.

Most tablets were found to be written in the Hittite language. However, some of the tablets are written in Hurrian, and a few paragraphs of the tablets are written in Hattic. Akkadian is also a common language, though it is interspersed with Hurrian and Hittite.

Given that the writing is mostly in cuneiform, there are Sumerograms interspersed throughout the texts regardless of language.

== Discovery ==
The Bogazkoy Archives were discovered in 1906 by Hugo Winckler and Theodore Makridi.

== Studying ==
- Hans Ehelohf wrote "Hans Ehelohf and the Bogazköy Archive in Berlin" after years of studying and translating.
- Hans Gustav Güterbock studied the archive and wrote multiple books about it for over 60 years.

== Bibliography ==
- Forrer, Emil (1919). "Die acht Sprachen der Boghazköi-Inschriften". Sitzungsberichte der Preussischen Akademie der Wissenschaften (in German). 35: 1029–1041.
- Sayce, A. H. (1920). "Die acht Sprachen der Boghazköi-Inschriften. By Dr.Emil Forrer. Sitzungsberichte der Preussischen Akademie der Wissenschaften , December 18, 1919". Journal of the Royal Asiatic Society. 52 (4): 603–605. doi:10.1017/S0035869X00148658. ISSN 1356-1863.
- Karusu, Cem (1996). Some remarks on archive-library/Systems of hattusa-yîoğazköy. doi:10.1501/Archv_0000000039. S2CID 195978847.
