= Egyptian–Hittite peace treaty =

Ancient Near Eastern treaty (c. 1259 BC)

Egyptian–Hittite peace treaty: New Kingdom of Egypt; Hittite Empire
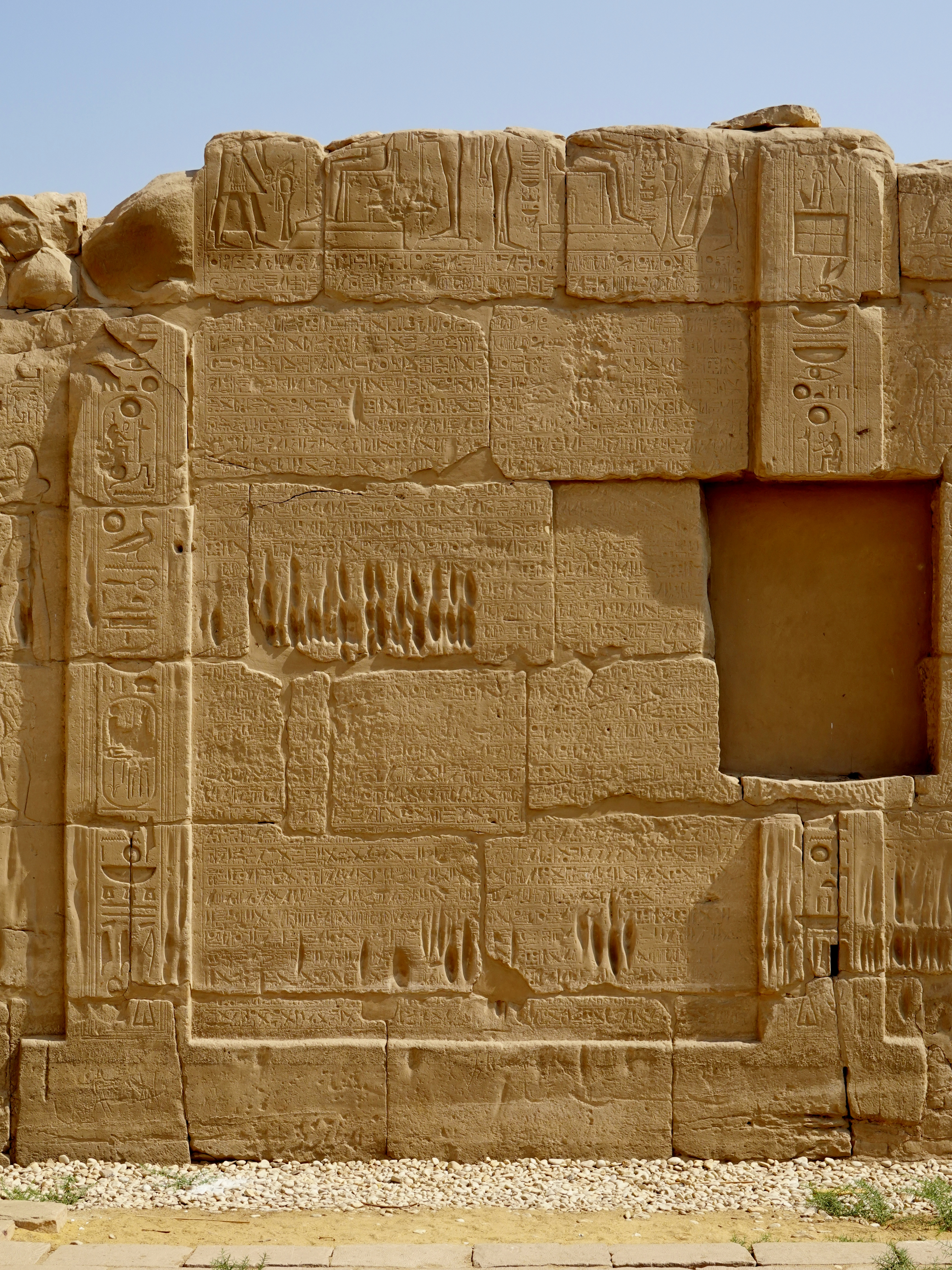
- The Egyptian version of the treaty at the Precinct of Amun-Re in Egypt

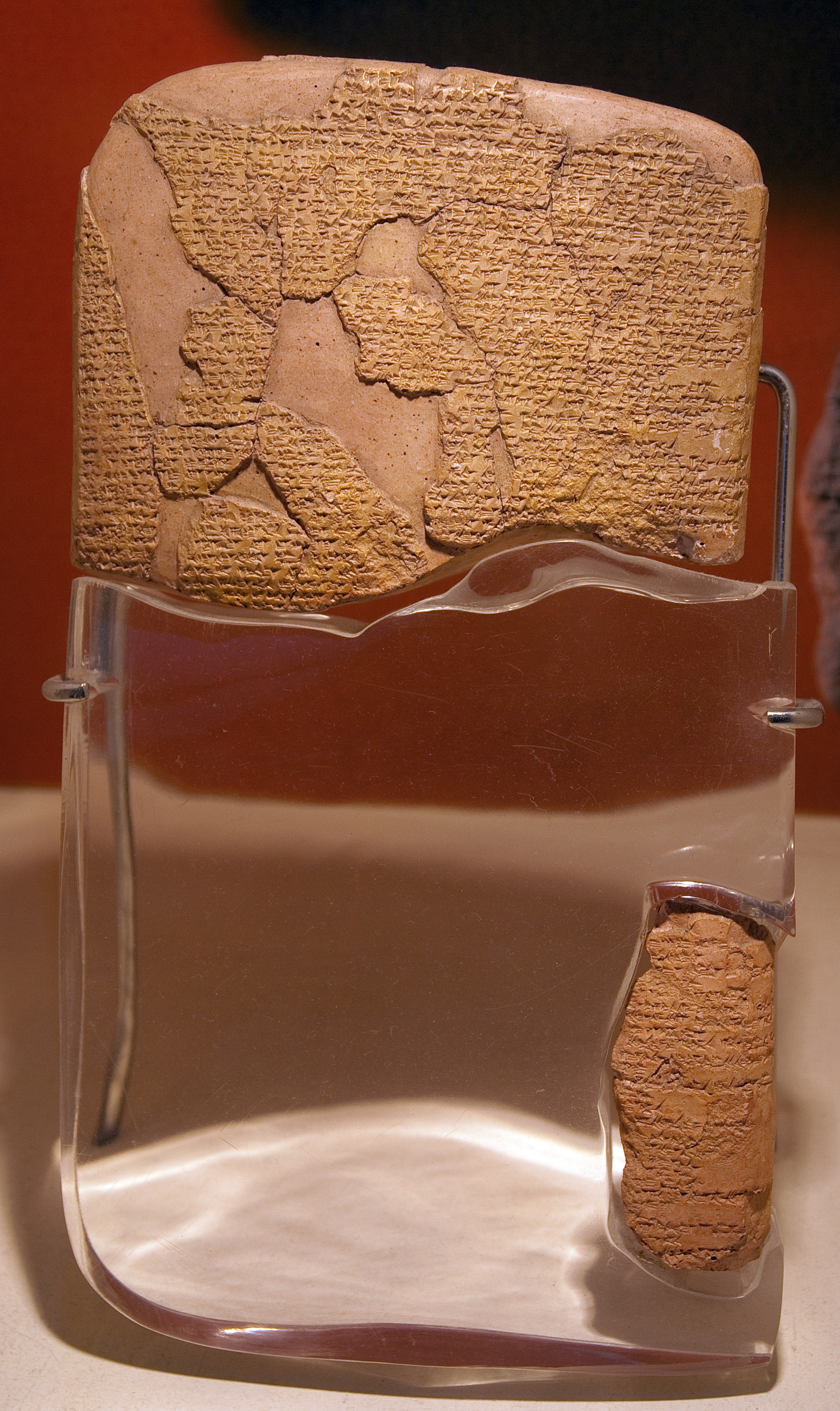
- The Hittite version of the treaty at the Museum of the Ancient Orient in Turkey
- Writing: Egyptian hieroglyphs and Hittite cuneiform
- Created: c. 1259 BC
- Discovered: 1828 (Egyptian) and 1906 (Hittite)
- Discovered by: Jean-François Champollion (decipherer); Hugo Winckler (archaeologist)
- Place: Egypt and Anatolia
- Present location: Karnak Temple Complex; Istanbul Archaeology Museums; Berlin State Museums
- Language: Egyptian language and Hittite language
- Period: Bronze Age
- Culture: Ancient Near East

The Egyptian–Hittite peace treaty, also known as the Eternal Treaty or the Silver Treaty, was concluded between Ramesses II of the Egyptian Empire and Ḫattušili III of the Hittite Empire around 1259 BC. It is the oldest known surviving peace treaty (though the much older treaty between Ebla and Abarsal may be the earliest recorded diplomatic treaty in human history) and the only one from the ancient Near East for which versions from each party have survived. Though it is sometimes called the Treaty of Kadesh, the text itself does not mention the Battle of Kadesh, which took place around 1274 BC. Both sides of the treaty have been the subject of intensive scholarly study. (Note: Mynářová 2014, p. 3: "It is important to stress that the 'exclusiveness' of the 'Eternal Treaty' rests largely in the fact that both versions – the Hittite one written in Akkadian and the Egyptian one – have been extensively preserved and thus remain the objects of an intense study.") Despite being agreed upon by the Egyptian pharaoh and the Hittite king, it did not bring about an enduring peace; in fact, "an atmosphere of enmity between Hatti and Egypt lasted many years" until the eventual treaty of alliance was signed.

Egypt's Kadesh inscriptions provide the best documented description of a battle in all of ancient history; they were first translated by the French scholar Jean-François Champollion, but it was not until 1858 that they were identified with the Hittites in the Bible. In 1906, the German archaeologist Hugo Winckler excavated and identified cuneiform-inscribed tablets that corresponded with the Egyptian text. (Note: Winckler 1906, cols. 629–630: "Von Briefen sind bis jetzt nur Bruchstücke gefunden worden, unter denen auch nur wenige einen Umfang haben, der für die nähere Bestimmung des Inhaltes etwas erhoffen lässt. Im übrigen ist der Inhalt solcher diplomatischen Noten dem allgemeinen Charakter nach ja von Tel-Amarna her bekannt. Soweit Absender oder Empfänger erhalten sind, rühren die meisten von Wasmuaria oder Wasmuaria satepuaria Ria-masesa-mai Amana d. i. wsr m't R' stp n R', R'ms sa mrj Jmn = Ramses II und seinem Zeitgenossen Hattusil (Ha-at-tu-si-li), dem weiland Chetasar oder Hattusir der ägyptischen Inschriften her. In den verschiedenen Urkunden wird die Genealogie der beiden gegeben (s. unten auch den Vertrag), Hattusil nennt als seine Vorfahren Mur-si-li' und Su-ub-bi-lu-li-u-ma, (der Name ganz so wie von Knudtzon für den Tel- Amarna- Brief festgestellt). Diese beiden sind „Grosskönig, König von Hatti", der Urgrossvater, ebenfalls Hattusil genannt, war „grosser König, König von Ku-us-sar", also ein Vasallenfürst des Hatti -Königs — falls nicht das Grosskönigtum überhaupt eine Gründung von Subliluliuma gewesen ist. Auch der „Mautener" der Aegypter wird in Briefen erwähnt und zwar, wie bereits vermutet (von Jensen zuerst?) tatsächlich in der Form Muttallu. Ein Bruchstück scheint von der Erhebung Subliluliumas zu sprechen. Es ist von Orakelmachenschaften dabei die Rede! Die erste grössere Urkunde, welche — etwa auf halber Höhe des Bergabhanges — gefunden wurde, war der Text eines Vertrags, der abgeschlossen wurde zwischen Hattusil und Ri-a-ma-se-sa-ma-a-i(ilu)A-ma-na mär Mi-im-mu-a-ri-a (Seti I) bin-bin Mi-in-pa-hi-ri-ta-ri-a. Beide Parteien nennen sich sar rabü sar Misri (Hatti) und dahinter noch asaridu (Ur. Sag), genau entsprechend dem bekannten Vertrage von Karnak. Mit diesem ist der unsrige in der Hauptsache identisch, er ist iler keilschriftliche babylonische Text, der ins Aegyptische übersetzt worden ist, wobei nicht überall wörtliche Uebereinstimmung zu herrschen scheint. Der Anhang stand wohl nicht darin, das Ende ist aber nicht erhalten. Auch er spricht von dem „Texte der silbernen Tafel" (sa ina rikilti muhhi dup-bi sa sarpi). Die Aufzählung der Götter von Hatti, welche im Aegyptischen steht, fehlt hier — ob nur abgebrochen, ist nicht festzustellen — wir haben sie aber auf einer sogleich zu erwähnenden anderen hethitisehen Urkunde, im wesentlichen ebenfalls übereinstimmend.") Translation of the texts revealed that this engraving was originally translated from now-lost silver tablets, which were given to each side.

The Egyptian version of the peace treaty was engraved in hieroglyphics on the walls of two temples belonging to Ramesses II in Thebes: the Ramesseum and the Precinct of Amun-Re at the Temple of Karnak. (Note: Breasted 1906, p. 163: "There are two originals: (1) At Karnak on wall extending south of the great hypostyle, published by Champollion, Notices descriptives, II, 195–204 (only 30 lines); Rosellini, Monumenti Storici, 116; Burton, Excerpta hieroglyphica, 17 (not used); Lepsius, Denkmäler, III, 146; Brugsch, Recueil de monuments, I, 28 (ll. 1–20); Bouriant, Recueil, XIII, 153–60; collation of the geographical names by Sayce, Proceedings of the Society of Biblical Archæology, XXI, 194 ff.; Müller, Fordersiatische Gesellschaft, VII, 5, Taf. I–XVI; I had also photographs by Borchardt. (2) At the Ramesseum; only fragments of the last 10 lines; Champollion, Notices descriptives, I, 585, 586; Sharpe, Egyptian Inscriptions, II, 50; Bouriant, Recueil, XIV, 67–70. In spite of the mutilated condition of the two monuments, the frequent repetitions make restoration certain in almost all cases. Müller's edition is the only one that is done with care and accuracy; a number of readings may be added to Müller's text from Sharpe's copy, which seems to have escaped him. The following translation was already in my manuscript when Müller's publication appeared. His text added a few new readings, but otherwise, the translation remains unchanged.") The scribes who engraved the Egyptian version of the treaty included descriptions of the figures and seals that were on the tablet that the Hittites had delivered.

The Hittite version of the peace treaty was found in their capital city of Hattusa, now in central Turkey, and is preserved on baked clay tablets uncovered among the Hittite royal palace's sizable archives. Two of the Hittite tablets are displayed at the Museum of the Ancient Orient, part of the Istanbul Archaeology Museums, while the third is displayed in Germany's Berlin State Museums. A copy of the treaty is prominently displayed on a wall at the Headquarters of the United Nations.

== Background ==
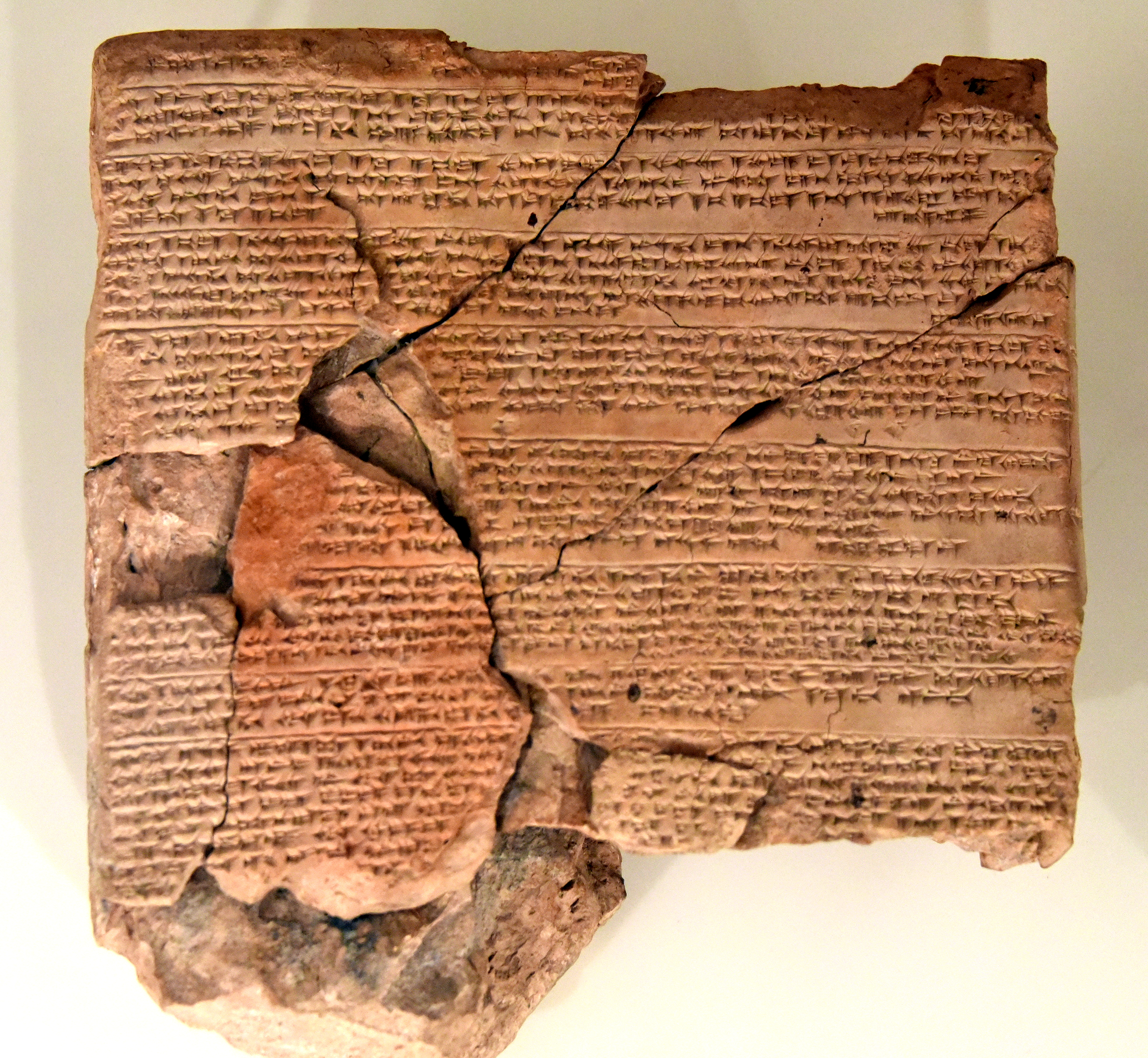
The Akkadian version of the treaty between Ḫattušili III and Bentešina the king of Amurru, mid-13th century BCE. Neues Museum, Berlin

The treaty was signed to end a long war between the Hittite Empire and the Egyptians, who had fought for over two centuries to gain mastery over the lands of the eastern Mediterranean. The conflict culminated with an attempted Egyptian invasion in 1274 BC that was stopped by the Hittites at the city of Kadesh on the Orontes River in what is now Syria. The Battle of Kadesh resulted in both sides suffering heavy casualties, but neither was able to prevail decisively in either the battle or the war. The conflict continued inconclusively for about fifteen more years before the treaty was signed. Although it is often referred to as the "Treaty of Kadesh", it was actually signed long after the battle, and Kadesh is not mentioned in the text. The treaty is thought to have been negotiated by intermediaries without the two monarchs ever meeting in person. Both sides had common interests in making peace; Egypt faced a growing threat from the "Sea Peoples", while the Hittites were concerned about the rising power of Assyria to the east. The treaty was ratified in the 21st year of Ramesses II's reign (1258 BC) and continued in force until the Hittite Empire collapsed eighty years later.

=== Earlier relationship with Hittites ===
Hittite-Egyptian relations officially began once Hatti took over Mitanni's role as the ruling power in central Syria and from there tensions would continue to be high until the conclusion of the treaty nearly 100 years later. During the invasion and the eventual defeat of Mitanni, the Hittite armies poured into Syria and began to exert their rule over the Egyptian vassals of Kadesh and Amurru. The loss of these lands in northern Syria would never be forgotten by the Egyptian pharaohs, and their later actions demonstrated that they never would fully concede that loss at the hands of the Hittite Empire. Egypt's attempts to regain the territory lost during the rule of Akhenaten continued to be futile until under the leadership of Seti I, the father of Ramesses II, significant gains started to be made. In his own Kadesh-Amurru campaign against the Hittite armies, Seti I vanquished his foes at a battle near Kadesh, but the gains proved short-lived since Kadesh was eventually given up by Seti in a later treaty.

The short gain by the Egyptians was the "opening salvo" of a conflict between the two empires, which would drag on over the next two decades.

=== Battle of Kadesh ===
The accounts of this battle mainly are derived from Egyptian literary accounts known as the Bulletin (also known as the Record) and the Poem as well as pictorial Reliefs. Unfortunately for scholars and individuals interested in the Battle of Kadesh, the details that those sources provide are heavily biased interpretations of the events. Since Ramesses II had complete control over the building projects, the resources were used for propagandist purposes by the pharaoh, who used them to brag about his victory at Kadesh. It is still known that Ramesses marched through Syria with four divisions of troops in the hopes of destroying the Hittite presence there and restoring Egypt to the "preeminent position it had enjoyed under Tuthmosis III". The Hittite king, Muwatalli II, gathered together an army of his allies to prevent the invasion of his territory. At the site of Kadesh, Ramesses foolishly outdistanced the remainder of his forces and, after hearing unreliable intelligence regarding the Hittite position from a pair of captives, the pharaoh pitched camp across from the town. The Hittite armies, hidden behind the town, launched a surprise attack against the Amun division and quickly sent the division scattering. Although Ramesses tried to rally his troops against the onslaught of the Hittite chariots, it was only after the arrival of relief forces from Amurru that the Hittite attack was thrown back.

Although the Egyptians were able to survive a terrible predicament in Kadesh, it was not the splendid victory that Ramesses sought to portray but a stalemate in which both sides had sustained heavy losses. After an unsuccessful attempt to gain further ground the following day, Ramesses headed back south to Egypt bragging about his individual achievements during Kadesh. Even though Ramesses claimed to have won the battle, Muwatalli and his army retook Amurru and extended the buffer zone with Egypt further southward.

=== Subsequent campaigns into Syria ===
Despite suffering the later losses during his invasion of Syria, Ramesses II launched another campaign in his eighth year of rule, which proved largely successful. Instead of launching an attack against the heavily fortified position of Kadesh or going through Amurru, Ramesses conquered the city of Dapur in the hope of using the city as a bridgehead for future campaigns. After the successful capture of Dapur, the army returned to Egypt, and so the recently acquired territory reverted to Hittite control. In the tenth year of his rule, he launched another attack on the Hittite holdings in central Syria, and yet again, all areas of conquest eventually returned to Hittite hands. The pharaoh now recognized the impossible task of holding Syria in such a fashion and so ended the northern campaign.

The period is notable in the relationship between the Hittites and the Egyptians because despite the hostilities between the two nations and military conquests in Syria, Kadesh had been the last direct, official military confrontation fought among the Hittites and Egyptians. In some regards, as historians including German assyriologist Horst Klengel have noted, the period could be considered a "cold war" between Hatti and Egypt.

=== Egyptian text ===
The Egyptian treaty was found in two originals: one with 30 lines at the Temple of Karnak on the wall extending south of the Great Hypostyle Hall, and the second showing 10 lines, at the Ramesseum. Jean-François Champollion copied a portion of the accords in 1828 and his findings were published posthumously in 1844. The Egyptian account described a great battle against the "Great King of Khatti".

=== Hittite text ===
In 1906–1908, the German archaeologist Hugo Winckler excavated the site of the Hittite capital, Hattusa (now Boğazkale in Turkey) in conjunction with Theodore Makridi, the second director of the Istanbul Archaeological Museum. The joint Turkish-German team found the remains of the royal archives, where they discovered 10,000 clay tablets written with cuneiform documenting many of the Hittites' diplomatic activities. The haul included three tablets on which the text of the treaty was inscribed in the Akkadian language, a lingua franca of the time. Winckler immediately grasped the significance of the discovery:

...a marvelously preserved tablet which immediately promised to be significant. One glance at it and all the achievement of my life faded into insignificance. Here it was – something I might have jokingly called a gift from the fairies. Here it was: Ramses writing to Hattusilis about their joint treaty ... confirmation that the famous treaty which we knew from the version carved on the temple walls at Karnak might also be illuminated from the otherwise. Ramses is identified by his royal titles and pedigree exactly as in the Karnak text of the treaty; Hattusilis is described in the same way – the content is identical, word for word with parts of the Egyptian version [and] written in beautiful cuneiform and excellent Babylonian ... As with the history of the people of Hatti, the name of this place was completely forgotten. But the people of Hatti evidently played an important role in the evolution of the ancient Western world, and though the name of this city and the name of the people were totally lost for so long, their rediscovery now opens up possibilities we cannot yet begin to think of.

The Hittite treaty was discovered by Hugo Winckler in 1906 at Boğazkale in Ottoman Empire. In 1921, Daniel David Luckenbill, crediting Bruno Meissner for the original observation, noted that "this badly broken text is evidently the Hittite version of the famous battle of Kadesh, described in prose and verse by the scribes of Ramses II".

In 2026, it was announced thru the Anadolu Agency that a copy of the Hittite treaty, rendered in Akkadian script was discovered in excavations at the site of Büyükkale, part of the Hittite capital of Hattusa.

== Content ==
The peace treaty of Ramesses II and Hattušiliš III is known as one of the most important official "international" peace treaties between two great powers from the ancient Near East because its exact wording is known to us. Divided into points, the treaty flows between the Egyptians and Hittites as each side makes pledges of brotherhood and peace to the other in terms of the objectives. The treaty can be seen as a promise of peace and alliance since both powers make the mutual guarantee that they would not invade the other's land. That provision ensured that both participants would act in harmony regarding the disputed Syrian holdings and, in effect, established boundaries for the two conflicting claims. No longer, according to the treaty, would costly Syrian campaigns be waged between the two Near Eastern powers, as a formal renunciation of further hostilities is made.

A second clause promoted alliance by making reassurances of aid, most likely military support, if either party was attacked by a third party or by internal forces of rebellion or insurgency. The other stipulations coincide with Hattušiliš's aims (consult Hittite aims section) in that the Hittite ruler placed great emphasis on establishing legitimacy for his rule. Each country swore to the other to extradite political refugees back to their home country, and in the Hittite version of the treaty, Ramesses II agreed to provide support to Hattušiliš' successors to hold the Hittite throne against dissenters. After the conclusion of the provision detailing the extradition of emigrants to their land of origin, both rulers call upon the respective gods of Hatti and Egypt to bear witness to their agreement. The inclusion of the gods is a common feature in major pieces of international law since only a direct appeal to the gods could provide the proper means to guarantee adherence to the treaty. Their noted ability to bestow curses to people was a serious penalty that would be imposed in case of a violation.

It is the only ancient Near Eastern treaty for which the versions of both sides have survived, which enables the two to be compared directly. It was structured to be almost-entirely symmetrical by treating both sides equally and requiring them to undertake mutual obligations. There are a few differences, however; for instance, the Hittite version adopts a somewhat evasive preamble, asserting that "as for the relationship between land of Egypt and the Hatti land, since eternity the god does not permit the making of hostility between them because of a treaty valid forever." By contrast, the Egyptian version states straightforwardly that the two states had been at war.

The treaty proclaimed that both sides would forever remain at peace and bound the children and grandchildren of the parties. They would not commit acts of aggression against each other, they would repatriate each other's political refugees and criminals and they would assist each other in suppressing rebellions. Each would come to the other's aid if it was threatened by outsiders: "And if another enemy come [against] the land of Hatti... the great king of Egypt shall send his troops and his chariots and shall slay his enemy and he shall restore confidence to the land of Hatti."

The text concludes with an oath before "a thousand gods, male gods and female gods" of the lands of Egypt and Hatti, witnessed by "the mountains and rivers of the lands of Egypt; the sky; the earth; the great sea; the winds; the clouds." If the treaty was ever violated, the oath-breaker would be cursed by the gods who "shall destroy his house, his land and his servants." Conversely, if he maintained his vows, he would be rewarded by the gods, who "will cause him to be healthy and to live."

== Analysis and theories ==
Previous and contemporary Egyptologists have argued over the character of the treaty. Some have interpreted it as a treaty of peace, but others have seen it as a treaty of alliance after a previous conclusion of hostilities. James Breasted in 1906 was one of the first to collect the historical documents of Ancient Egypt in an anthology and understood the treaty to be "not only a treaty of alliance, but also a treaty of peace, and the war [Ramesses's Syrian campaigns] evidently continued until the negotiations for the treaty began". For Breasted, the intermediate periods of conflict were directly resolved by the signing of the treaty and so required it to be one of both alliance and peace. However, later Egyptologists and other scholars began, even within 20 years of Breasted's work, to question whether the treaty between Ramesses II and Hattušiliš III was one of peace at all. Alan Gardiner and his partner Stephen Langdon examined previous interpretations and determined that their predecessors had misinterpreted the line "to beg peace" in the text. The oversight in the language caused Egyptologists to see the treaty incorrectly as terminating a war, instead of seeking a beneficial alliance between Hatti and Egypt. Trevor Bryce further argues that in the Late Bronze Age, treaties were established "for reasons of expediency and self-interest... their concern was much more with establishing strategic alliances than with peace for its own sake". The emerging consensus is that despite the treaty mentioning establishing "brotherhood and peace forever", its main purpose was to form a mutually-beneficial alliance between the two powers.

Another matter of speculation is which of the two countries pursued negotiations first. As has been mentioned, Ramesses II had lost portions of his Syrian territory when he retreated to Egypt after the Battle of Kadesh. In that sense, Hattušiliš would have had the upper hand in the negotiations since Ramesses desired to emulate the military successes of Tuthmosis III. Until the 1920s, Egyptologists had mistaken the insecurity of Egypt's Syrian holdings to mean that Ramesses had come to Hattušiliš to beg for a solution to the Syria problem. Professor Donald Magnetti of Fordham Law School brought up the point that the Pharaoh's duty to bring mortal activity in line with the divine order through the maintenance of maat would have been reason enough for Ramesses II to pursue peace. However, that interpretation is incorrect since the questions about Hattušiliš's legitimacy as monarch would demand recognition by his fellow royals in the Near East. His weak position abroad and domestically, which defined his reign, suggests that it was the Hatti leader who sued for peace. In fact, Trevor Bryce interprets the opening lines of the treaty to be "Ramesses, Beloved of Amon, Great King, King of Egypt, hero, concluded on a tablet of silver with Hattušiliš, Great King, King of Hatti, his brother" to enforce that the incentives of the Hatti ruler had far greater implications that compelled him to sue for peace.

== Aims ==
=== Egypt ===
Considering his relatively stronger position over Hattušiliš, it is unknown what Ramesses hoped to achieve by an alliance with his hated Hittite enemies. After 15 years of futile attempts at regaining his lost territory in Syria, scholars argue that Ramesses now realised that his opportunities to match the military achievements of Tuthmosis III were unrealizable. In that light, it became increasingly important for Ramesses to obtain an international victory through diplomacy to bolster his deeds as pharaoh. The attempts at regaining the lands that the Hittites had taken ultimately failed to break the hold of the Hittites over the region. Instead, Ramesses would take his losses as long as the Hittites would recognise the current division of Syria, give Egypt access to ports in the Hittite territory to boost commerce and grant trading access as far north as Ugarit. His ability to advance Egypt's financial and security interests by means other than war led to Ramesses's willingness to pursue friendlier relations with the Hittites.

Maintaining the status quo in the region became a priority for Ramesses because of the emergence of Assyria's military power, whose might was a force to be reckoned with. Thus, Ramesses would have found it desirable to ensure that Assyria would not have a presence in Syria. If the Assyrians were allowed to enter Syria, they would be an arm's length from Egypt itself and pose a threat to Egypt proper. By accepting the Hittite overture of alliance, Ramesses would count on the fact that the newly-made allies would help to safeguard their mutual holdings in Syria against the upstart power of Assyria.

Besides the added incentive of no longer depleting Egypt's finances with expensive wars against Hatti and increasing the security of Egypt's claims in Syria, signing the treaty with Hatti also provided Ramesses the opportunity to brag about his "defeat" of the Hittites. Since Hattušiliš had been the one to approach Ramesses, the pharaoh, in his depictions at the Ramesseum, represents the settlement as one that the Hittite king had asked for in a position of submission. Considering the official language of the treaties then to be completely independent of each other, Ramesses was able to present the terms of the treaty from his perspective. That free control over the depictions of his role by the language of the treaty gave the pharaoh opportunity to present a greatly-idealized point of view. His ability to assert a sense of supremacy as ruler of Egypt and his attempts to portray that strategic alliance as a victory over the Hittites demonstrate the reasons for Ramesses' to be so willing to choose such a mutually-beneficial peace. The conclusion of open hostilities between the regional powers was a personal triumph for the aging pharaoh and, as his monument at Abu Simbel shows, the pharaoh made his subjects well aware of the fact that Ramesses had conquered the Hittites.

=== Hittite Empire ===
In opposition to Ramesses's strength in international affairs, Hattušiliš III was disadvantaged by questions of legitimacy that raised doubts about his position as king of the Hittites. Hattušiliš had defeated his nephew, Urhi-Tesub, for the throne in all regards but continued to be seen as a usurper of the kingship. Urhi-Tesub's determination to regain the throne from his uncle caused the Hittite Empire to enter a period of instability both at home and abroad. The nephew had been banished after an unsuccessful coup and ended up in Egypt. Ramesses II thereby posed a direct threat to Hattušiliš's reign by harboring Urhi-Tesub within Egypt's borders. Hattušiliš realised that only an alliance with Ramesses could prevent the monarch from unleashing his nephew back into contention with him for the throne. By concluding a treaty with Egypt, Hattušiliš also hoped that garnering the endorsement of Ramesses of his position as the true king of Hatti would effectively reconcile the disaffected elements in his kingdom that backed Urhi-Tesub as the rightful possessor of the kingship.

In the Near Eastern world, Ramesses wielded great power among the rulers of the day, and formal recognition from him would give Hattušiliš credibility on the international stage.

The threat of his nephew staging another coup against him greatly worried Hattušiliš while he faced a considerable threat from the Assyrians in the east. Hattušiliš's predecessor, the Assyrian king, had taken Hanigalbat, which had been a vassal territory under Hittite control. That aggression strained relations between the two countries, but even more importantly, the Assyrians appeared to put themselves in the position to launch further attacks across the Euphrates River. The perceived threat of Assyrian invasion proved a strong motivator for the Hittites to open up negotiations with Egypt. It was that sense of the Assyrian danger that pushed Hatti into a relationship with Egypt.

Under the terms of the treaty, the Egyptians had to join with their Hatti allies if Assyria invaded Hittite territory. Besides that threat from the east, Hattušiliš recognised the need to strengthen his relationship with his Egyptian neighbours. The competition that had existed between Hatti and Egypt over the Syrian lands no longer served the interests of Hattušiliš. In fact, Trevor Bryce argues that Hattušiliš was satisfied with his current holdings in Syria and that any further expansion of Hittite territory southward was both unjustifiable and undesirable.

== Aftermath ==
After reaching the desired alliance with Hatti, Ramesses could now turn his energies to domestic building projects, such as the completion of his great, rock-hewn Abu Simbel temples. The warming of the relationship between Ramesses and the Hittite king enabled the pharaoh to divert resources from his army to his extensive construction projects. In the 34th year of Ramesses II's reign, there is evidence that in an effort to establish stronger familial bonds with Hatti, the pharaoh married a Hittite princess. Both evidence of the dynastic marriage and the lack of textual evidence of a deterioration of the friendly relationship demonstrate that peaceful dealings between Hatti and Egypt continued for the remainder of Ramesses's reign. By furthering their bonds of friendship through marriage, the Hittites and Egyptians maintained a mutually-beneficial peace that would exist between them until the fall of Hatti to Assyria, nearly a century later.

== Text ==
- Pritchard 1969, pp. 199–201: "Treaty between the Hittites and Egypt" – via Internet Archive
- Lepsius c. 1859, section III, picture 146: "Theben. Karnak. Grosser Tempel. Mauer der Südseite der grossen Pfeilerhalle." – via University of Halle

== Bibliography ==
- Bederman, David J. (2001). International law in antiquity. Cambridge University Press. ISBN 978-0-521-79197-7.
- Breasted, James Henry (1906). "Treaty with the Hittites". Ancient Records of Egypt: Historical Documents from the Earliest Times to the Persian Conquest. Vol. III. University of Chicago Press. pp. 163–174 (secs. §367–§391), also pp. 174–175. LCCN 06005480.
- Bryce, Trevor (2005). The Kingdom of the Hittites. Oxford University Press. ISBN 978-0-19-928132-9.
- Bryce, Trevor (2006). "The 'Eternal Treaty' from the Hittite perspective". The British Museum Studies in Ancient Egypt and Sudan (BMSAES). 6: 1–11.
- Burney, Charles Allen (2004). Historical dictionary of the Hittites. Lanham, MD: Scarecrow Press. ISBN 978-0-8108-4936-5.
- Champollion le jeune (1844). Notices descriptives. Vol. 1. Firmin Didot – via Google Books.
- Edel, Elmar (1997). Der Vertrag zwischen Ramses II. von Ägypten und ̮Hattušili III. von ̮Hatti. Gebr. Mann. ISBN 978-3-7861-1944-9.
- Kitchen, K. A. (1982). Pharaoh Triumphant: The Life and Times of Ramses II, King of Egypt. Warminster, England: Aris & Phillips. ISBN 978-0-85668-215-5.
- Klengel, Horst (2002). From war to eternal peace : Ramesses II and Khattushili III. Bulletin. Vol. 37. Canadian Society for Mesopotamian Studies. pp. 49–56. OCLC 60463518.
- Langdon, Stephen H.; Gardiner, Alan H. (1920). "The Treaty of Alliance between Hattusili, King of the Hittites and the Pharaoh Ramesses II of Egypt". Journal of Egyptian Archaeology. 6 (3): 179–205. doi:10.2307/3853914. JSTOR 3853914.
- Lepsius, Karl Richard (c. 1859) [published 1849–1859]. Denkmäler aus Ägypten und Äthiopien.
- Luckenbill, Daniel David (1921). "Hittite Treaties and Letters" (PDF). The American Journal of Semitic Languages and Literatures. 37 (3): 161–211. doi:10.1086/369930. JSTOR 528149. S2CID 170816836.
- Magnetti, Donald L. (October 1978). "The Function of the Oath in the Ancient Near Eastern International Treaty". American Journal of International Law. 72 (4): 815–829. doi:10.2307/2199778. ISSN 0002-9300. JSTOR 2199778. S2CID 147546223.
- Murnane, William J. (1990). The Road to Kadesh: A Historical Interpretation of the Battle Reliefs of King Sety I at Karnak (PDF). Studies in Ancient Oriental Civilization. Vol. 42 (2nd ed.). Oriental Institute of the University of Chicago. ISBN 0-918986-67-2.
- Mynářová, Jana (2014). "Lost in Translation. An Egyptological Perspective on the Egyptian-Hittite Treaties". Annals of the Náprstek Museum. 35 (2): 3–8. Archived from the original (PDF) on 2017-03-05.
- OEAE: Redford, Donald B., ed. (2001). The Oxford Encyclopedia of Ancient Egypt. Oxford University Press. Also, The Oxford Encyclopedia of Ancient Egypt (e-reference ed.). 2005. doi:10.1093/acref/9780195102345.001.0001. ISBN 978-0-19-510234-5.
  - Cline, Eric H. (2001). "Hittites". OEAE.
  - Murnane, William J. (2001). "Battle of Kadesh". OEAE.
- "Peace Pact Set in 1279 B.C." Times Colonist. The Canadian Press. September 25, 1970. p. 18. Archived from the original on December 17, 2020 – via Newspapers.com.
- "Peace Treaties Haven't Changed Much". The Province. The Canadian Press. September 26, 1970. p. 13. Archived from the original on December 17, 2020 – via Newspapers.com.
- Pritchard, James (1969). Ancient Near Eastern Texts Relating to the Old Testament (Third ed.). Princeton University Press.
- Rowton, M. B. (1959). "The Background of the Treaty between Ramesses II and Hattušiliš III". Journal of Cuneiform Studies. 13 (1): 1–11. doi:10.2307/1359563. JSTOR 1359563. S2CID 163354219.
- "Treaty of Kadesh". Istanbul: Museum of the Ancient Orient. Archived from the original on 2017-06-25.
- Winckler, Hugo (15 December 1906). "Die im Sommer 1906 in Kleinasien ausgeführten Ausgrabungen" [The excavations carried out in Asia Minor in summer 1906]. Orientalistische Literaturzeitung (in German). 9 (1–6). cols. 621–634. doi:10.1524/olzg.1906.9.16.313. hdl:2027/chi.091389536. S2CID 163417618.
- Winckler, Hugo (1907). "Vorläufige Nachrichten über die Ausgrabungen in Boghaz-köi im Sommer 1907. Die Tontafelfunde" [Preliminary report on the excavations in Boghaz-köi in summer 1907. The clay tablet finds] (PDF). Mitteilungen der Deutschen Orient Gesellschaft (in German). 35: 1–59 – via University of Tübingen.
- Wiseman, Laura (2015). "Behind Hittite Lines" (PDF). Gorffennol. History and Classics Department, Swansea University. Archived from the original (PDF) on 2015-08-14.
- Wood, Michael (1998). In search of the Trojan War. University of California Press. ISBN 978-0-520-21599-3.
- "Buchbesprechungen". Zeitschrift für Assyriologie und vorderasiatische Archäologie. 89 (1): 140–158. 1999. doi:10.1515/zava.1999.89.1.140.
