= Yekbas, Boğazkale =

Village in Turkey

Yekbas
- Neighbourhood
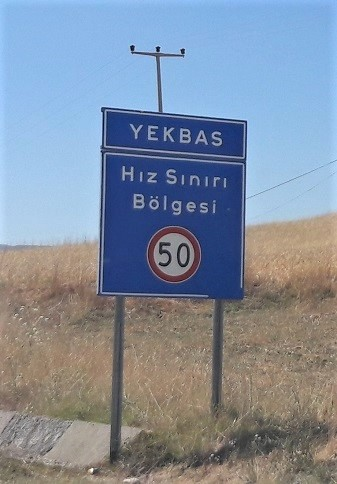

- Location within Turkey
- Coordinates: 40°03′00″N 34°36′19″E
- Country: Turkey
- Province: Çorum
- District: Boğazkale
- Municipality: Boğazkale
- Population (2022): 834
- Time zone: UTC+3 (TRT)

Yekbas is a neighbourhood of the town Boğazkale, Boğazkale District, Çorum Province, Turkey. Its population is 834 (2022). Before the 2013 reorganisation, it was a town (belde).
