= Örenkaya =

Örenkaya can refer to:

- Örenkaya, Boğazkale
- Örenkaya, Sandıklı
