= Indo-Hittite languages =

Hypothetical proto-language

Indo-Hittite
- Linguistic classification: Proposed primary language family
- Proto-language: Proto-Indo-Hittite
- Subdivisions: Anatolian †; Other Indo-European languages

Language codes
- ISO 639-2 / 5: ine
- Glottolog: indo1319 Indo-European

In Indo-European linguistics, the term Indo-Hittite (also Indo-Anatolian) refers to Edgar Howard Sturtevant's 1926 hypothesis that the Anatolian languages split off a Pre-Proto-Indo-European language considerably earlier than the separation of the remaining Indo-European languages. The prefix Indo- does not refer to the Indo-Aryan branch in particular, but stands for Indo-European, and the -Hittite part refers to the Anatolian language family as a whole.

Proponents of the Indo-Hittite hypothesis claim the separation preceded the spread of the remaining branches by several millennia, possibly as early as 7000 BC. In this context, the proto-language before the split of Anatolian would be called Proto-Indo-Hittite, and the proto-language of the remaining branches, before the next split, presumably of Tocharian, would be called Proto-Indo-European (PIE). This is a matter of terminology, though, as the hypothesis does not dispute the ultimate genetic relation of Anatolian with Indo-European; it just means to emphasize the assumed magnitude of temporal separation.

According to Craig Melchert, the current tendency is to suppose that Proto-Indo-European evolved, and that the "prehistoric speakers" of Anatolian became isolated "from the rest of the PIE speech community, so as not to share in some common innovations." Hittite, as well as its Anatolian cousins, split off from Proto-Indo-European at an early stage, thereby preserving archaisms that were later lost in the other Indo-European languages.

== Linguistics ==
Traditionally there has been a strong notion among Indo-European linguistics that the Anatolian branch was separated earlier than other branches. Within the framework of the Kurgan hypothesis, the split is estimated to have occurred in roughly 4000 BC.

Some fundamental shared features such as the aorist category of the verb (which denotes action without reference to duration or completion), with the perfect active particle -s fixed to the stem, link the Anatolian languages closer to the southeastern languages such as Greek and Armenian and to Tocharian.

Features such as the lack of feminine gender in the declensions of nominals, a division between an "animate" common gender and an "inanimate" neuter gender, a reduced vowel system, a tendency towards a greater simplicity of the case system, a less typical Indo-European vocabulary and other striking features have been interpreted alternately as archaic retentions, which means that the common Indo-European structural features observed in the non-Anatolian branches evolved at a later stage, or just as later innovations being caused by prolonged contacts in typologically alien surroundings "en route" or after their arrival in Anatolia.

In favor of the Indo-Hittite hypothesis is the very Indo-European agricultural terminology conserved in Anatolia, otherwise considered the cradle of agriculture, and the laryngeal theory that hypothesizes the existence of one or more additional spirant or stop consonants in the Indo-European parent language that has only been attested in Hittite and of which only traces are left outside Anatolian.

However, in general this hypothesis is considered to attribute too much weight to the Anatolian evidence and as early as 1938 it was demonstrated that the Anatolian group should be placed on the same level as other Indo-European subgroups and not as equal with Indo-European. According to another view the Anatolian subgroup left the Indo-European parent language comparatively late, approximately at the same time as Indo-Iranian and later than the Greek or Armenian divisions. A third view, especially prevalent in the so-called French school of Indo-European studies, holds that extant similarities in non-satem languages in general—including Anatolian—might be due to their peripheral location in the Indo-European language area and early separation, rather than indicating a special ancestral relationship.

== Genetics ==
Recent research provides evidence for the theory that the Indo-Hittite branch originated from a migration wave that predated the Steppe expansions. The Caucasus-Lower Volga population has been identified as the population that was the ancestral source for this migration, as their genetic signature has been identified in Bronze Age Central Anatolian remains. If true, this would resolve the issue of why the Hittites had no Steppe ancestry despite being an Indo-European speaking population. However, several linguists have disputed this and believe that genetics cannot accurately describe historical language change.

== See also ==
- Anatolian hypothesis
