= Sarıçiçek =

Sarıçiçek may refer to several places in Turkey:

- Sarıçiçek, Bingöl
- Sarıçiçek, Boğazkale
- Sarıçiçek, Karayazı
- Sarıçiçek, Posof
