= Kaymaz (disambiguation) =

Kaymaz can refer to:

- Kaymaz
- Kaymaz, Boğazkale
- Kaymaz, Yapraklı
