= Kalašma =

Late Bronze Age polity in northern Anatolia

Kalašma or Kalasma (occasionally Kalašpa) was a late Bronze Age polity in Northern Anatolia on the border of the Hittite Empire.

== Geography ==
Kalašma was located somewhere in northwestern Anatolia. Though its precise location is uncertain, its location relative to other places can be deduced from geographical references in contemporary documents. For instance, it is known to have been south of Arawanna and west of Pala. Current research suggests that it was located near modern day Bolu.

A city called Harranassi may have been located in Kalašma. When Hittite was first deciphered, Bedřich Hrozný took the placename "Kalašmitta" to be a variant of "Kalašma", but current research suggests that they were in fact separate places.

== History ==
Forlanini says that Kalašma was not a tribal name but a city-state, the eponymous city having been fortified by the Hittite king Hantili I (died c. 1560 BCE). Hantili failed to reinstate Kalašma's local weather god, and on returning to Ḫattuša, the Hittite capital, he had to perform expiatory rituals to the Sun goddess of the Earth.

Arnuwanda I (ruled 1380s BCE) installed oathbound military commanders in regions including Kalašma. Civil administration was by a council of elders. In the reign of Arnuwanda's son Tudhaliya II, troops from Kalašma and elsewhere rebelled and fled through Išuwa to an unnamed enemy country; Tudhaliya's son Suppiluliuma I subdued the rebel regions. There were several revolts in the reign of Suppiluliuma's son Muršili II (ended 1295 BCE). One triggered a punitive raid by Hittite general Nuwanzas. Muršili replaced the elders with a single administrator named Aparru, who rebelled, seized royal power, and invaded neighbouring Sappa. Aparru was soon defeated but Kalašma was in civil war until pacified the next year by Hutupiyanza, governor of Pala.

Kalašmans were later to be found further east, at Pahhuwa on the upper Euphrates, possibly having been deported there by Muršili, or as mercenary soldiers. Kalašmans fought alongside the Hittites at the Battle of Kadesh against the Egyptian Empire in 1274 BCE.

Kalašma is one of the places mentioned in a Luwian hieroglyphic tablet from the reign of Arnuwanda III (ended c. 1210 BCE) as conquered by Mukšuš.

== Language ==
In 2023 a tablet written in "the language of Kalašma" was discovered in the Bogazköy Archive excavated at Ḫattuša. It is in the Anatolian branch of the Indo-European languages, probably the Luwic sub-branch.

In 1958 Einar von Schuler had noted that a Hittite-language oath taken by officials from Kalašma represented a different dialect of Hittite from the oath of other regions' officials.

== Sources ==
- Carnevale, Antonio (2018). La frontiera orientale dell'impero ittita (PDF) (Doctorate) (in Italian). Sapienza University of Rome. hdl:11573/1147202. CORE output ID 188823629.
- Forlanini, Massimo (2010). "Deportati e mercenari dall'Anatolia occidentale all'alto Eufrate sotto l'impero hittita". Orientalia (in Italian). 79 (2): 152–163. ISSN 0030-5367. JSTOR 43077905.
- Garstang, John; Gurney, O.C. (1960). The geography of the Hittite Empire. Occasional Publications. Vol. 5. London: British Institute of Archaeology at Ankara – via Internet Archive.
- Weeden, Mark; Ullmann, Lee Z., eds. (20 May 2022) [2017]. Hittite Landscape and Geography. Handbook of Oriental Studies, Section 1: The Near and Middle East. Vol. 121. Brill. ISBN 978-90-04-34939-1.
