= Yanıcak, Boğazkale =

Village in Turkey

Yanıcak
- Village
- Location in Turkey
- Coordinates: 40°07′N 34°35′E
- Country: Turkey
- Province: Çorum
- District: Boğazkale
- Population (2022): 46
- Time zone: UTC+3 (TRT)

Yanıcak is a village in the Boğazkale District of Çorum Province in Turkey. Its population was 46 in 2022.

== History ==
The village was recorded as Yanjik in records from 1928.

== Geography ==
The village is located 78 km from the city centre of Çorum and 13 km from the centre of Boğazkale.
