= Gölpınarlar, Boğazkale =

Village in Turkey

Gölpınarlar
- Village
- Location in Turkey
- Coordinates: 40°06′48″N 34°39′38″E
- Country: Turkey
- Province: Çorum
- District: Boğazkale
- Population (2022): 29
- Time zone: UTC+3 (TRT)

Gölpınarlar is a village in the Boğazkale District of Çorum Province in Turkey. Its population is 29 (2022).
