= Yazır, Boğazkale =

Village in Turkey

Yazır
- Village
- Location in Turkey
- Coordinates: 39°59′27″N 34°35′36″E
- Country: Turkey
- Province: Çorum
- District: Boğazkale
- Population (2022): 97
- Time zone: UTC+3 (TRT)

Yazır is a village in the Boğazkale District of Çorum Province in Turkey. Its population is 97 (2022).
