= Emirler, Boğazkale =

Village in Turkey

Emirler
- Village
- Country: Turkey
- Province: Çorum
- District: Boğazkale
- Population (2022): 226
- Time zone: UTC+3 (TRT)

Emirler is a village in the Boğazkale District of Çorum Province in Turkey. Its population is 226 (2022).
