= Kalašma language =

Extinct Anatolic language

Kalašma
- Kalasmaic, Kalasmian
- Native to: Kalašma
- Region: Anatolia
- Era: 13th century BCE
- Language family: Indo-European: Anatolian; Luwo-Lydian?; Luwo-Palaic?; Luwic?; Kalašma
- Writing system: Hittite cuneiform

Language codes
- ISO 639-3: None (mis)

The Kalašma language, or Kalasmaic, is an extinct Anatolian language spoken in the late Bronze Age polity of Kalašma, which lay on the northwest fringe of the Hittite Empire, likely in or around what is now the Turkish province of Bolu.

== Discovery ==
The Kalasmaic text was discovered in 2023, by researchers at Julius-Maximilians-Universität Würzburg. It is written on a clay tablet indexed KBo 71.145. The tablet, written in Hittite cuneiform of the 13th century BCE, is one of several Hittite texts recording rituals of the empire's subjects and neighbouring peoples. Its Hittite-language introduction describes its main text as in "the language of Kalašma" (^{URU}ka-la-aš-mi-li).

The language was deciphered by Daniel Schwemer in the 71st volume of the edition Keilschrifttexte aus Boghazköi ("Cuneiform Texts from Boğazköy"). A detailed analysis of the text was published in November 2024 by Elisabeth Rieken, Ilya Yakubovich and Daniel Schwemer.

== Classification ==
Kalašma is part of the Anatolian branch of the Indo-European language family, as confirmed by Elisabeth Rieken. Its place within the Anatolian languages is uncertain, but it has been hypothesized to be part of the Luwic subgroup.
