= Hugo Winckler =

German archaeologist and historian

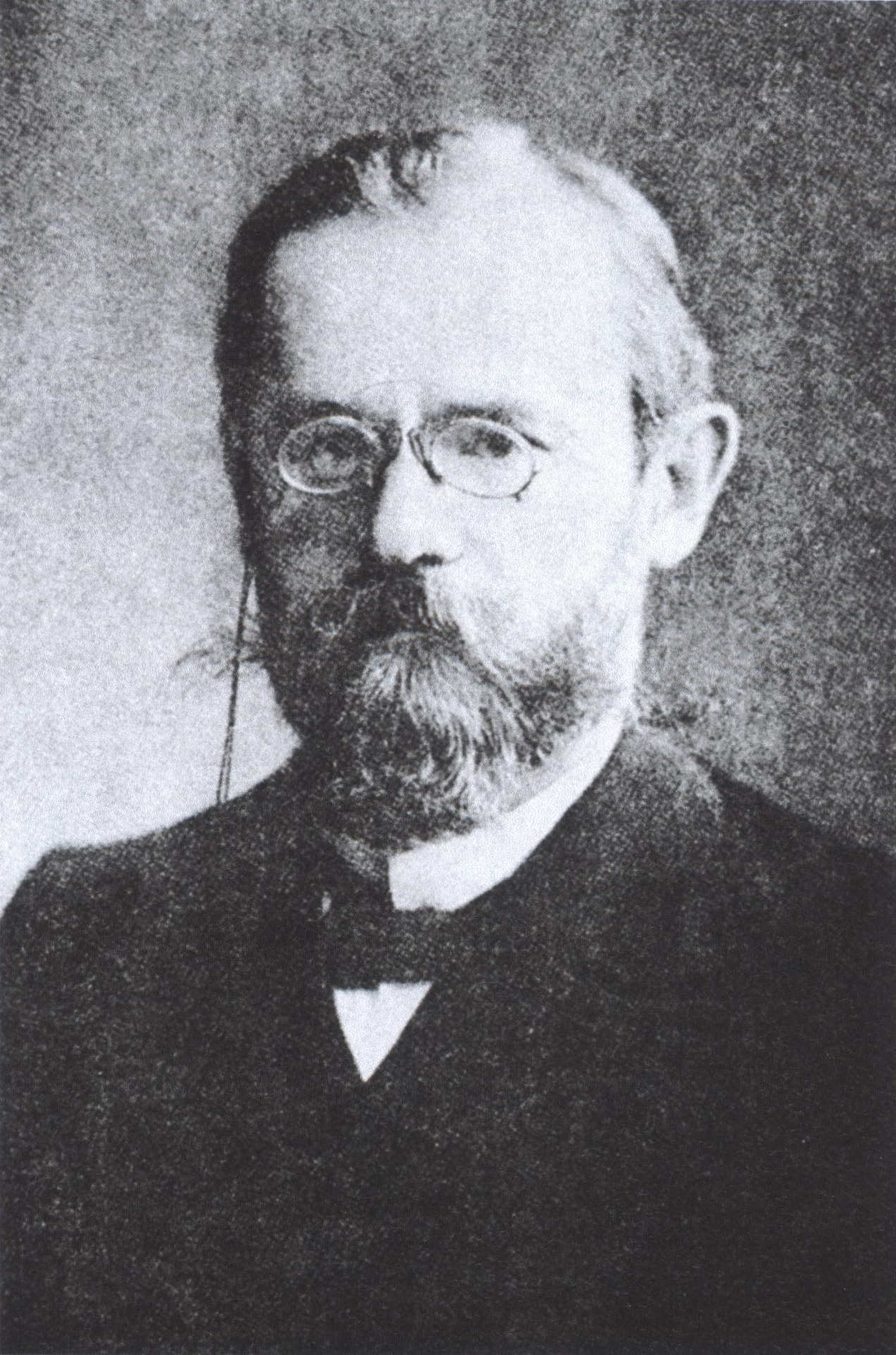
- Hugo Winckler
- Born: 4 July 1863; Gräfenhainichen, Prussian Saxony
- Died: 19 April 1913 (aged 49); Berlin
- Known for: Hattusa
- Scientific career
- Fields: Archeology

Hugo Winckler (4 July 1863 – 19 April 1913) was a German orientalist, archaeologist, and historian who uncovered the capital of the Hittite Empire (Hattusa) at Boğazkale, Turkey.

A student of the languages of the ancient Middle East, he wrote extensively on Assyrian cuneiform and the Old Testament, compiled a history of Babylonia and Assyria that was published in 1891, and translated both the Code of Hammurabi and the Amarna letters. In 1904, he was appointed professor of Oriental languages at the University of Berlin.

== Education ==
Winckler studied at the University of Berlin with Eberhard Schrader, founder of German Assyriology. He was awarded his doctorate on 24 June 1886, for his work on the cuneiform texts of Sargon.

== Career ==
=== Teaching ===
Winckler became a lecturer at the University of Berlin in 1891. In 1904, he was appointed Extraordinary Professor of Oriental languages.

=== Excavations ===
Winckler began excavations at Boğazkale in 1906 with support from the German Orient Society together with Ottoman archeologist Theodore Makridi. His excavations revealed a stockpile of thousands of hardened clay tablets, many written in the hitherto unknown Hittite language, that allowed Winckler to draw a preliminary outline of Hittite history in the 14th and 13th centuries BC. Winckler continued excavations at the site until 1912, during which time his finds proved that the city was once the capital of a great empire. The main language on the tablets, known as the Bogazköy Archive was deciphered in 1915 by the Czech scholar Bedřich Hrozný.

=== Impact ===
Otto Rank, in Art and Artist, describes Winckler as the "rediscoverer of the ancient Oriental world picture in the fifth to sixth millennium B.C. Winckler's popular description: "The whole universe is the great world, the macrocosm; its parts are small universes in themselves, microcosms. Such a microcosm is man, who is himself an image of the universe and a perfect being. But the great universe is likewise a man, and as it is 'God,' God has human form. In his own image, therefore, was man created. This was still the belief of medieval medicine, which we know to have had (chiefly for the purpose of bleeding) a method of dividing up the human body according to the twelve signs of the zodiac (head, ram; neck, bull; arms, twins; and so on). On this 'scientific' treatment of a patient was based..."

Rank also wrote in Art and Artist, regarding the significance of macroscosmic symbolism, "In the first, and still the best, summary of this sort, which Winckler gives us in the chapter "Myth, Legend, and Play" of his popular account of the intellectual culture of ancient Babylon, the fundamental fact is established that the festivals connected with various games had all a seasonal character, with a definite calendar as their basis. In these festivals and the associated games, "the events in heaven which the festival represents—for example, the death and rebirth of the deity, the victory over the powers of darkness, the dragon—are represented and played before the people."

== Works ==
- Die Keilschrifttexte Sargons. Leipzig, E. Pfeiffer. 1889.
- Untersuchungen zur altorientalischen Geschichte. Leipzig: Pfeiffer. 1889.
- Geschichte Babyloniens und Assyriens. 1892. (English translation, 1907)
- Alttestamentliche Untersuchungen. E. Pfeiffer. 1892.
- Geschichte Israels. 1898.
- Musri, Meluhha, Main. 1898.
- Gesetze Hammurabis. 1904.
- Die jüngsten Kämpfe wider den Panbabylonismus. Leipzig: J.C. Hinrichs. 1907.
- Die babylonische Geisteskultur. Quelle & Meyer. 1908.
