= Anatolian languages =

Extinct branch of Indo-European languages

Anatolian
- Geographic distribution: Anatolia
- Ethnicity: Anatolians
- Extinct: 3rd century BC – 6/7th century AD
- Linguistic classification: Indo-European: Anatolian
- Proto-language: Proto-Anatolian
- Subdivisions: Hittite; Palaic; Lydian; Luwic

Language codes
- Glottolog: anat1257

The Anatolian languages are an extinct branch of Indo-European languages that were spoken in Anatolia (modern Turkey). The best known Anatolian language is Hittite, the earliest-attested Indo-European language.

Only discovered in the late 19th and early 20th centuries, the Anatolian languages are probably the earliest branch to have split from Proto-Indo-European. The presence of the laryngeal consonants ḫ and ḫḫ in Hittite and Luwian provided support for the laryngeal theory of Indo-European linguistics. While Hittite attestation ends after the Bronze Age, hieroglyphic Luwian survived until the conquest of the Neo-Hittite kingdoms by the Semitic Assyrian Empire, and alphabetic inscriptions of Anatolian languages are fragmentarily attested until the early 1st millennium AD, eventually succumbing to the hellenization of Anatolia as a result of Greek colonisation.

== Origins ==
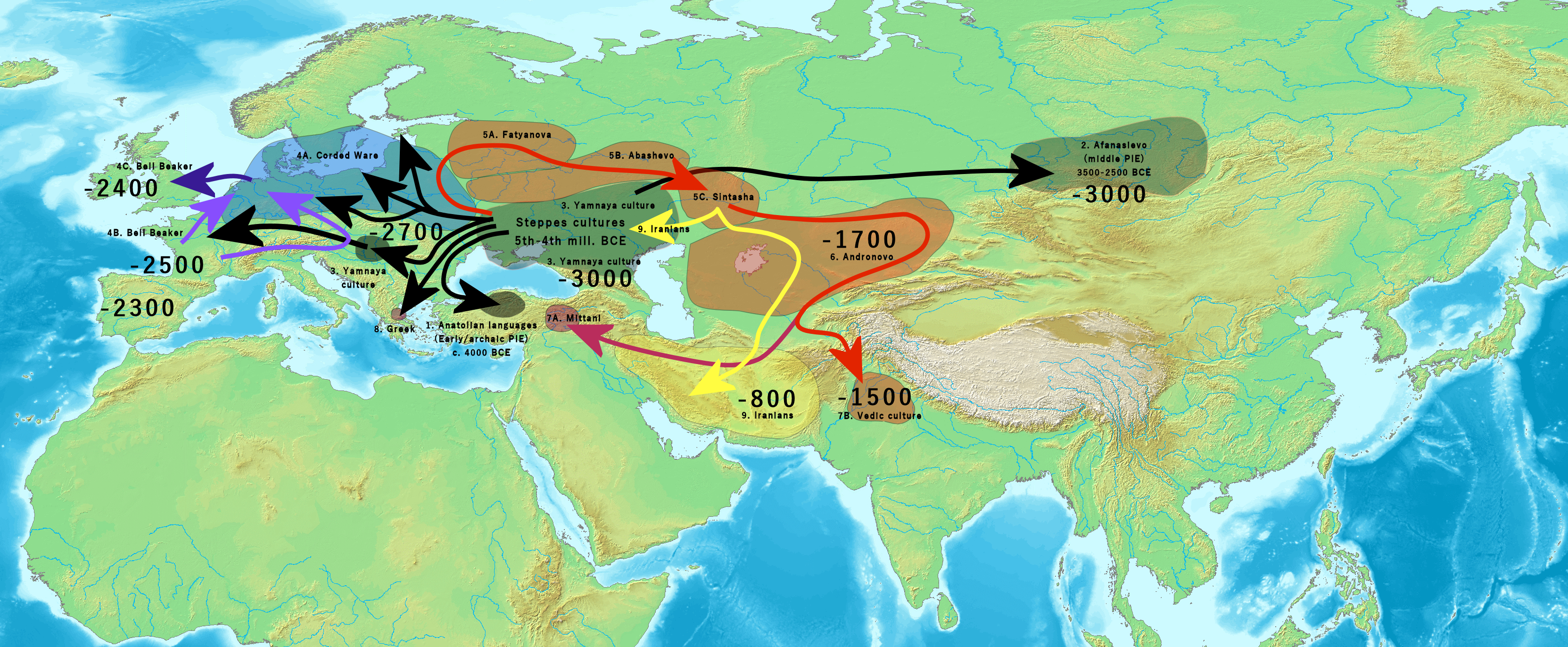
Early Indo-European migrations from the Pontic–Caspian steppe

The Anatolian branch is probably the earliest to have split from the Proto-Indo-European language, from a stage referred to either as Indo-Hittite or "Archaic PIE"; typically a date in the mid-4th millennium BC is assumed for the evolution of this branch, followed by a migration into Anatolia in the early 2nd millennium BC. Under the Kurgan hypothesis, there are two possibilities for how it reached Anatolia: from the north via the Caucasus, or from the west, via the Balkans; the latter is considered somewhat more likely by Mallory (1989), Steiner (1990), and Anthony (2007). Statistical research by Quentin Atkinson and others using Bayesian inference and glottochronological markers favors an Indo-European origin in Anatolia, though the method's validity and accuracy are subject to debate, and this is a minority view concerning the Urheimat (homeland) of PIE.

It has been theorized that Cernavodă culture, together with the Sredny Stog culture, was the source of Anatolian languages and introduced them to Anatolia through the Balkans after Anatolian split from the Proto-Indo-Anatolian language, which some linguists and archaeologists place in the area of the Sredny Stog culture. Petra Goedegebuure suggests Anatolian separated from PIE in the north by 4500 BC and had arrived in Anatolia by about 2500–2000 BC, via a migration route through the Caucasus.

Recent studies have provided evidence that Caucasus-Lower Volga population may have been the population that spoke Proto-Indo-European before the Anatolian split, due to the presence of their genetic signatures among the Bronze Age Anatolians. This would explain why the Hittites and other Indo-European populations in Anatolia lacked classic Yamnaya-like Steppe ancestry, but instead carried an archaic Steppe component (from Progress-Berezhnovka or Nalchik CLV-source). While this archaic lineage formed up to 80% of the Yamnaya gene pool, it also contributed 10–20% to Bronze Age Anatolians.

== Classification ==
Melchert (2012) has proposed the following classification:

- Proto-Anatolian
  - Hittite
  - Luwic
    - Luwian
    - Carian
    - Milyan
    - Lycian
    - Sidetic
    - Pisidian
  - Palaic
  - Lydian

Classification of the Anatolian languages according to Alwin Kloekhorst (2022)

Kloekhorst (2022) has proposed a more detailed classification, with estimated dating for some of the reconstructed stages:

- Proto-Anatolian (diverged around the 31st century BC)
  - Proto-Luwo-Lydian
    - Proto-Luwo-Palaic
      - Proto-Luwic (c. 21st–20th century BC)
        - Proto-Luwian (c. 18th century BC)
          - Cuneiform Luwian (16th–15th century BC)
          - Hieroglyphic Luwian (13th–8th century BC)
        - Proto-Lyco-Carian
          - Proto-Carian–Milyan
            - Carian (7th–3rd century BC)
            - Milyan (5th century BC)
          - Proto-Lycian–Sidetic
            - Lycian (5th–4th century BC)
            - Sidetic (5th–2nd century BC)
        - Pisidian (1st–2nd century AD) [unclassified]
      - Proto-Palaic
        - Palaic (16th–15th century BC)
    - Proto-Lydian
      - Lydian (8th–3rd century BC)
  - Proto-Hittite (c. 2100 BC)
    - Kanišite Hittite (c. 1935–1710 BC)
    - Ḫattuša Hittite (c. 1650–1180 BC)

In addition, the recently discovered Kalašma language is believed to be a Luwic language.

== Features ==
=== Phonology ===
The phonology of the Anatolian languages preserves distinctions lost in its sister branches of Indo-European. Famously, the Anatolian languages retain the PIE laryngeals in words such as Hittite ḫāran- (cf. Ancient Greek ὄρνῑς, Lithuanian eręlis, Old Norse ǫrn, PIE *h₃éron-) and Lycian 𐊜𐊒𐊄𐊀 χuga (cf. Latin avus, Old Prussian awis, Archaic Irish ᚐᚃᚔ (avi), PIE *h₂éwh₂s). The three dorsal consonant series of PIE also remained distinct in Proto-Anatolian and have different reflexes in the Luwic languages, e.g. Luwian where *kʷ > ku-, *k > k-, and *ḱ > z-. The three-way distinction in Proto-Indo-European stops (i.e. *p, *b, *bʰ) collapsed into a fortis-lenis distinction in Proto-Anatolian, conventionally written as /p/ vs. /b/. In Hittite and Luwian cuneiform, the lenis stops were written as single voiceless consonants while the fortis stops were written as doubled voiceless, indicating a geminated pronunciation. By the first millennium, the lenis consonants seem to have been spirantized in Lydian, Lycian, and Carian.

The Proto-Anatolian laryngeal consonant *H patterned with the stops in fortition and lenition and appears as geminated -ḫḫ- or plain -ḫ- in cuneiform. Reflexes of *H in Hittite are interpreted as pharyngeal fricatives and those in Luwian as uvular fricatives based on loans in Ugaritic and Egyptian, as well as vowel-coloring effects. The laryngeals were lost in Lydian but became Lycian 𐊐 (χ) and Carian 𐊼 (k), both pronounced [k], as well as labiovelars —Lycian 𐊌 (q), Carian 𐊴 (q)—when labialized. Suggestions for their realization in Proto-Anatolian include pharyngeal fricatives, uvular fricatives, or uvular stops.

=== Verbs ===
Anatolian morphology is considerably simpler than other early Indo-European (IE) languages. The verbal system distinguishes only two tenses (present-future and preterite), two voices (active and mediopassive), and two moods (indicative and imperative), lacking the subjunctive and optative moods found in other old IE languages like Tocharian, Sanskrit, and Ancient Greek. Anatolian verbs are typically divided into two conjugations: the mi conjugation and ḫi conjugation, named for their first-person singular present indicative suffix in Hittite. While the mi conjugation has clear cognates outside of Anatolia, the ḫi conjugation is distinctive and appears to be derived from a reduplicated or intensive form in PIE.

=== Gender ===
Anatolian has a two-gender system: animate (common) and inanimate (neuter). Proto-Anatolian almost certainly did not have a separate feminine agreement class. In the past, the two-gender system has been described as a merger of masculine and feminine genders following the phonetic merger of PIE a-stems with o-stems. However, the discovery of a group of inherited nouns with suffix *-eh₂ in Lycian and therefore Proto-Anatolian raised doubts about the existence of a feminine gender in PIE. Typically marked with -ā, (Note: A long */aː/ is the expected reflex of PIE *eh₂ in most non-Anatolian Indo-European languages.) the feminine gender in other Indo-European languages may be connected to a derivational suffix *-h₂, attested for abstract nouns and collectives in Anatolian. The appurtenance suffix *-ih₂ is scarce in Anatolian but fully productive as a feminine marker in Tocharian. This suggests the Anatolian gender system is the original for IE, while the feminine-masculine-neuter classification of Tocharian + Core IE languages may have arisen following a sex-based split within the class of topical nouns to provide more precise reference tracking for male and female humans.

=== Case ===
Proto-Anatolian retained the nominal case system of Proto-Indo-European, including the vocative, nominative, accusative, instrumental, dative, genitive, and locative cases, and added an allative case. Nouns distinguish singular and plural numbers, as well as a collective plural for inanimates in Old Hittite and remnant dual forms for natural pairs. The Anatolian branch also has a split-ergative system based on gender, with inanimate nouns being marked in the ergative case when the subject of a transitive verb. This may be an areal influence from nearby non-IE ergative languages like Hurrian.

=== Syntax ===
The basic word order in Anatolian is subject-object-verb except for Lycian, where verbs typically precede objects. Clause-initial particles are a striking feature of Anatolian syntax; in a given sentence, a connective or the first accented word usually hosts a chain of clitics in Wackernagel's position. Enclitic pronouns, discourse markers, conjunctions, and local or modal particles appear in rigidly ordered slots. Words fronted before the particle chain are topicalized.

== Languages ==
The list below gives the Anatolian languages in a relatively flat arrangement, following a summary of the Anatolian family tree by Robert Beekes (2010). This model recognizes only one clear subgroup, the Luwic languages. Modifications and updates of the branching order continue, however. A second version opposes Hittite to Western Anatolian, and divides the latter node into Lydian, Palaic, and a Luwian group (instead of Luwic).

=== Hittite ===
The Hittite Empire at its greatest extent under Suppiluliuma I (c. 1350–1322 BC) and Mursili II (c. 1321–1295 BC)

Hittite (nešili) was the language of the Hittite Empire, dated approximately 1650–1200 BC, which ruled over nearly all of Anatolia during that time. The earliest sources of Hittite are the 19th century BC Kültepe texts, the Semitic Akkadian language records of the kârum kaneš, or "port of Kanes," an Assyrian trading colony within the city of Kanesh (Kültepe). This collection records Hittite names and words loaned into Akkadian (Old Assyrian) from Hittite. Other such examples are found in other Assyrian Karums in Southeast Anatolia. The Hittite name for the city was Neša, from which the Hittite endonym for the language, Nešili, was derived. The fact that the enclave was Assyrian, rather than Hittite, and that the city name became the language name, suggest that the Hittite language was already in a position of influence, perhaps dominance, in central Anatolia.

The main cache of Hittite texts is the approximately 30,000 clay tablet fragments, of which only some have been studied, from the records of the royal city of Hattuša, located on a ridge near what is now Boğazkale, Turkey (formerly named Boğazköy). The records show a gradual rise to power of the Anatolian language speakers over the native language isolate-speaking Hattians, until at last the kingship became an Anatolian privilege. From then on, little is heard of the Hattians, but the Hittites kept the name. The records include rituals, medical writings, letters, laws and other public documents, making possible an in-depth knowledge of many aspects of the civilization.

Most of the records are dated to the 13th century BC (Late Bronze Age). They are written in cuneiform script borrowing heavily from the Mesopotamian system of writing of nearby Assyria. The script is a syllabary. This fact, combined with frequent use of Akkadian and Sumerian words, as well as logograms, or signs representing whole words, to represent lexical items, often introduces considerable uncertainty as to the form of the original. However, phonetic syllable signs are present also, representing syllables of the form V, CV, VC, CVC, where V and C denotes a vowel and a consonant, respectively.

Hittite is divided into Old, Middle, and New (or Neo-). The dates are somewhat variable. They are based on an approximate coincidence of historical periods and variants of the writing system: the Old Kingdom and the Old Script, the Middle Kingdom and the Middle Script, and the New Kingdom and the New Script. Fortson gives the dates, which come from the reigns of the relevant kings, as 1570–1450 BC, 1450–1380 BC, and 1350–1200 BC respectively.

All cuneiform Hittite came to an end at the end of the 13th century BC during the Bronze Age Collapse, with the destruction of Hattusas and the end of the empire, much of it having been annexed by the Middle Assyrian Empire over the preceding century and the capital and its surrounds sacked by the Phrygians in 1200 BC.

=== Palaic ===
Palaic, spoken in the north-central Anatolian region of Palā (later Paphlagonia), extinct around the 13th century BC, is known only from fragments of quoted prayers in Old Hittite texts. It was extinguished by the replacement of the culture, if not the population, as a result of an invasion by the Kaskas, which the Hittites could not prevent.

=== Luwic branch ===
Luwic
- Luvic, Luwoid
- Geographic distribution: Ancient Anatolia
- Ethnicity: Anatolians
- Linguistic classification: Indo-European: Anatolian; Luwo-Lydian?; Luwo-Palaic?; Luwic
- Early forms: Proto-Indo-European: Proto-Anatolian
- Subdivisions: Carian; Luwian; Lycian; Milyan; Pisidian; Sidetic; Kalasmaic?

Language codes
- Glottolog: luvi1234

The term Luwic was proposed by Craig Melchert as the node of a branch to include several languages that seem more closely related than the other Anatolian languages. This is not a neologism, as Luvic had been used in the early 20th century to mean the Anatolian language group as a whole, or languages identified as Luvian by the Hittite texts. The name comes from Hittite luwili (𒇻𒌑𒄿𒇷). The earlier use of Luvic fell into disuse in favour of Luvian. Meanwhile, most of the languages now termed Luvian, or Luvic, were not known to be so until the latter 20th century. Even more fragmentary attestations might be discovered in the future.

The ancient people were referred to in Hittite texts with forms based on Luwiya / luwili-. As Anatolian linguistics developed, scholars increasingly preferred spellings that reflected the original w sound rather than writing it as v. Before the term Luwic was proposed for Luwian and its closest relatives, scholars used the term Luwian in the sense of 'Luwic languages'. For example, Silvia Luraghi's Luwian branch begins with a root language she terms the "Luwian group", which logically is in the place of Common Luwian or Proto-Luwian. Its three offsprings, according to her are Milyan, Proto-Luwian, and Lycian, while Proto-Luwian branches into Cuneiform and Hieroglyphic Luwian.

==== Luwian ====
Area where the 2nd millennium BC Luwian language was spoken

The Luwian language is attested in two different scripts, cuneiform and Anatolian hieroglyphs, over more than a millennium. While the earlier scholarship tended to treat these two corpora as separate linguistic entities, the current tendency is to separate genuine dialectal distinctions within Luwian from orthographic differences. Accordingly, one now frequently speaks of Kizzuwatna Luwian (attested in cuneiform transmission), Empire Luwian (cuneiform and hieroglyphic transmission), and Iron Age Luwian / Late Luwian (hieroglyphic transmission), as well as several more Luwian dialects, which are more scarcely attested.

The cuneiform corpus (Melchert's CLuwian) is recorded in glosses and short passages in Hittite texts, mainly from Boğazkale. About 200 tablet fragments of the approximately 30,000 contain CLuwian passages. Most of the tablets reflect the Middle and New Script, although some Old Script fragments have also been attested. Benjamin Fortson hypothesizes that "Luvian was employed in rituals adopted by the Hittites." A large proportion of tablets containing Luwian passages reflect rituals emanating from Kizzuwatna. On the other hand, many Luwian glosses (foreign words) in Hittite texts appear to reflect a different dialect, namely Empire Luwian. The Hittite language of the respective tablets sometimes displays interference features, which suggests that they were recorded by Luwian native speakers.

The hieroglyphic corpus (Melchert's HLuwian) is recorded in Anatolian hieroglyphs, reflecting Empire Luwian and its descendant Iron Age Luwian. Some HLuwian texts were found at Boğazkale, so it was formerly thought to have been a "Hieroglyphic Hittite". The contexts in which CLuwian and HLuwian have been found are essentially distinct. Annick Payne asserts: "With the exception of digraphic seals, the two scripts were never used together."

HLuwian texts are found on clay, shell, potsherds, pottery, metal, natural rock surfaces, building stone and sculpture, mainly carved lions. The images are in relief or counter-relief that can be carved or painted. There are also seals and sealings. A sealing is a counter-relief impression of hieroglyphic signs carved or cast in relief on a seal. The resulting signature can be stamped or rolled onto a soft material, such as sealing wax. The HLuwian writing system contains about 500 signs, 225 of which are logograms, and the rest purely functional determinatives and syllabograms, representing syllables of the form V, CV, or rarely CVCV.

HLuwian texts appear as early as the 14th century BC in names and titles on seals and sealings at Hattusa. Longer texts first appear in the 13th century BC. Payne refers to the Bronze Age HLuwian as Empire Luwian. All Hittite and CLuwian came to an end at 1200 BC as part of the Late Bronze Age collapse, but the concept of a "fall" of the Hittite Empire must be tempered in regard to the south, where the civilization of a number of Syro-Hittite states went on uninterrupted, using HLuwian, which Payne calls Iron-Age Luwian and dates 1000–700 BC. Presumably these autonomous "Neo-Hittite" heads of state no longer needed to report to Hattusa. HLuwian caches come from ten city states in northern Syria and southern Anatolia: Cilicia, Charchamesh, Tell Akhmar, Maras, Malatya, Commagene, Amuq, Aleppo, Hama, and Tabal.

==== Lycian ====
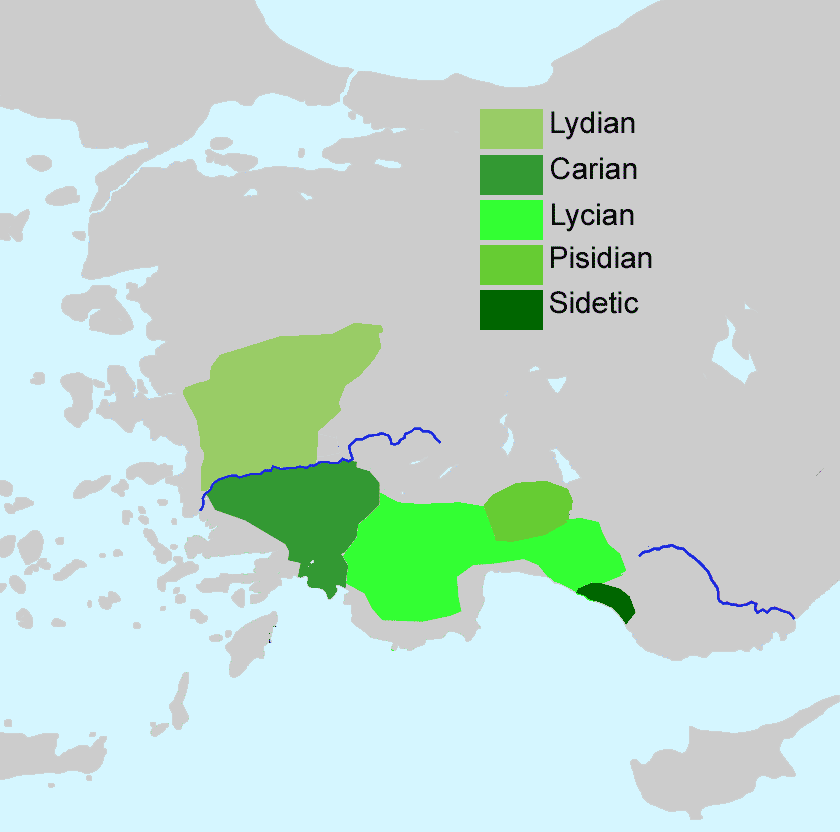
Luwic branch of Anatolian languages attested in the mid-1st millennium BC

Lycian (called "Lycian A" when Milyan was a "Lycian B") was spoken in classical Lycia, in southwestern Anatolia. It is attested from 172 inscriptions, mainly on stone, from about 150 funerary monuments, and 32 public documents. The writing system is the Lycian alphabet, which the Lycians modified from the Greek alphabet. In addition to the inscriptions are 200 or more coins stamped with Lycian names. Of the texts, some are bilingual in Lycian and Greek, and one, the Létôon trilingual, is in Lycian, Greek, and Aramaic. The longest text, the Xanthus stele, with about 250 lines, was originally believed to be bilingual in Greek and Lycian; however the identification of a verse in another, closely related language, a "Lycian B" identified now as Milyan, renders the stele trilingual. The earliest of the coins date before 500 BC; however, the writing system must have required time for its development and implementation.

The name of Lycia appears in Homer but more historically, in Hittite and in Egyptian documents among the "Sea Peoples", as the Lukka, dwelling in the Lukka lands. No Lycian text survives from Late Bronze Age times, but the names offer a basis for postulating its continued existence.

Lycia was completely Hellenized by the end of the 4th century BC, after which Lycian is not to be found. Stephen Colvin goes so far as to term this, and the other scantily attested Luwic languages, "Late Luwian", although they probably did not begin late. Analogously, Ivo Hajnal calls them – using an equivalent German term – Jungluwisch.

==== Milyan ====
Milyan was previously considered a variety of Lycian, as "Lycian B", but it is now classified as a separate language.

==== Carian ====
Carian was spoken in Caria. It is fragmentarily attested from graffiti by Carian mercenaries and other members of an ethnic enclave in Memphis, Egypt (and other places in Egypt), personal names in Greek records, twenty inscriptions from Caria (including four bilingual inscriptions), scattered inscriptions elsewhere in the Aegean world and words stated as Carian by ancient authors. Inscriptions first appeared in the 7th century BC.

==== Sidetic ====
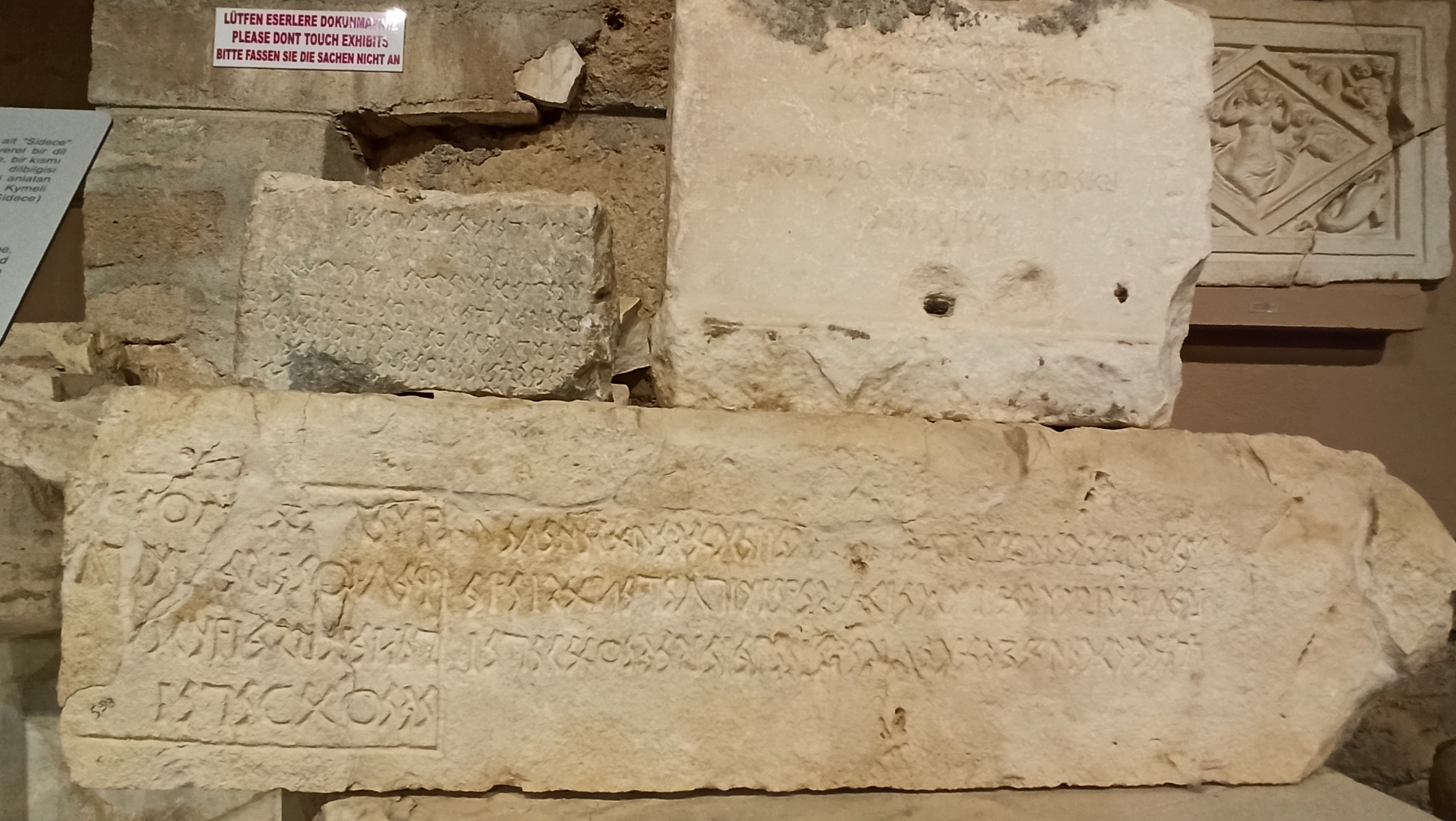
Inscriptions in Sidetic language, exhibits of the Museum of Side, Turkey

Sidetic was spoken in the city of Side. It is known from coin legends and bilingual inscriptions that date from the 5th to the 2nd centuries BC.

==== Pisidian ====
The Pisidic language was spoken in Pisidia. Known from some thirty short inscriptions from the first to second centuries AD, it appears to be closely related to Lycian and Sidetic.

==== Language of Kalašma ====
The "language of Kalašma" was spoken in the Kalašma region, which can maybe be localised near the modern city of Bolu. The language is known from a single inscription on a clay tablet found in Hattusa.

=== Lydian ===
Lydian was spoken in Lydia. Within the Anatolian group, Lydian occupies a unique and problematic position due, first, to the still very limited evidence and understanding of the language and, second, to a number of features not shared with any other Anatolian language. The Lydian language is attested in graffiti and in coin legends from the end of the 8th or the beginning of the 7th century BC down to the 3rd century BC, but well-preserved inscriptions of significant length are presently limited to the 5th–4th centuries BC, during the period of Persian domination. Extant Lydian texts now number slightly over one hundred but are mostly fragmentary.

=== Armenian–Anatolian language contact ===
The possibility of Anatolian loanwords in Armenian has been discussed since the early 20th century. While proposed borrowings from Luwian are generally accepted, the existence of Hittite loanwords remains debated due to chronological and geographical concerns.

Some scholars argue that clear evidence of Hittite influence would support the presence of Proto-Armenians in the Armenian Highlands during the 2nd millennium BC, contradicting theories of a later migration following the fall of Urartu. Potential Armenian loanwords in Urartian have also been cited as evidence for earlier Armenian presence.

The region referred to in Hittite texts as Ḫayaša (14th–13th centuries BC) has been tentatively linked to parts of historical Armenia and possibly to the Armenian ethnonym hay, though this connection is contested.

A small number of Hittite words have been compared to Armenian terms (such as luzzi- and luc, arziiya- and art), but the direction of borrowing and the validity of these etymologies remain uncertain. Some scholars suggest that the limited Anatolian elements in Armenian may have been acquired during migration through Anatolia.

=== Other possible languages ===
It has been proposed that other languages of the family existed that have left no records, including the pre-Greek languages of Lycaonia and Isauria unattested in the alphabetic era. In these regions, only Hittite, Hurrian, and Luwian are attested in the Bronze Age. Languages of the region such as Mysian and Phrygian are Indo-European but not Anatolian, and are thought to have entered Anatolia from the Balkan peninsula at a later date than the Anatolian languages.

== Extinction ==
Anatolia was heavily Hellenized following the conquests of Alexander the Great, as well as the previous Greek colonisation, and the native languages of the area ceased to be spoken as a result of assimilation in the subsequent centuries, making Anatolian the first well-attested branch of Indo-European to become extinct. The only other well-known major branch with no living descendants is Tocharian, whose attestation ceases in the 8th century AD.

While Pisidian inscriptions date until the second century AD, the poorly-attested Isaurian language, which was probably a late Luwic dialect, appears to have been the last of the Anatolian languages to become extinct. Epigraphic evidence, including funerary inscriptions dating from as late as the 6th century, has been found by archaeologists.

Personal names with Anatolian etymologies are known from the Hellenistic and Roman era and may have outlasted the languages they came from. Examples include Cilician Ταρκυνδβερρας Tarku-ndberras "assistance of Tarḫunz", Isaurian Ουαξαμοας Ouaxamoas < *Waksa-muwa "power of blessing(?)", and Lycaonian Πιγραμος Pigramos "resplendent, mighty" (cf. Carian 𐊷𐊹𐊼𐊥𐊪𐊸 Pikrmś, Luwian pīhramma/i-).

Several Ancient Greek words are suggested to be Anatolian borrowings, for example:

- Apóllōn (Doric: Apéllōn, Cypriot: Apeílōn), from *Apeljōn, as in Hittite Appaliunaš;
- dépas 'cup; pot, vessel', Mycenaean di-pa, from Hieroglyphic Luwian ti-pa-s 'sky; bowl, cup' (cf. Hittite nēpis 'sky; cup');
- eléphās 'ivory', from Hittite laḫpa (itself from Mesopotamia; cf. Phoenician ʾlp, Egyptian ꜣbw);
- kýanos 'dark blue glaze; enamel', from Hittite kuwannan- 'copper ore; azurite' (ultimately from Sumerian kù-an);
- kýmbachos 'helmet', from Hittite kupaḫi 'headgear';
- kýmbalon 'cymbal', from Hittite ḫuḫupal 'wooden percussion instrument';
- mólybdos 'lead', Mycenaean mo-ri-wo-do, from *mork^{w}-io- 'dark', as in Lydian mariwda(ś)-k 'the dark ones';
- óbryza 'vessel for refining gold', from Hittite ḫuprušḫi 'vessel';
- tolýpē 'ball of wool', from Hittite taluppa 'lump'/'clod' (or Cuneiform Luwian taluppa/i).

A few words in the Armenian language have been also suggested as possible borrowings from Hittite or Luwian, such as Arm. զուռնա zuṙna (compare Luwian zurni "horn").

== See also ==
- Armenian hypothesis
- Tree model
- Urheimat
- Galatian, a Celtic language spoken in Anatolia
