= Isaurian language =

Extinct language of Asia Minor

Isaurian
- Native to: Asia Minor
- Region: Isauria
- Era: until the 5th century or 6th century AD
- Language family: unclassified; personal names appear to be related to Luwian

Language codes
- ISO 639-3: None (mis)
- Glottolog: None

Isaurian is an extinct language spoken in the area of Isauria, Asia Minor. Epigraphic evidence, including funerary inscriptions, has been found into the 6th century AD. The personal names of its speakers appear to be derived from Luwian and thus Indo-European. Isaurian names containing clear Anatolian roots include Οαδας Oadas, Τροκονδας Trokondas (cf. Luwian Tarḫunt, Lycian 𐊗𐊕𐊌𐊌𐊑𐊗 Trqqñt), Κουδεις Koudeis (cf. Lycian Kuwata), and Μοασις Moasis (cf. Hittite muwa 'power').

The Isaurian personal name Τουατρις Touatris may reflect the Indo-European word for 'daughter' (compare Hieroglyphic Luwian ^{FILIA}tú-wa/i-tara/i-na).
