= Yukarıfındıklı, Boğazkale =

Village in Turkey

Yukarıfındıklı
- Village
- Location in Turkey
- Coordinates: 39.999°N 34.538°E
- Country: Turkey
- Province: Çorum
- District: Boğazkale
- Population (2022): 40
- Time zone: UTC+3 (TRT)

Yukarıfındıklı is a village in the Boğazkale District of Çorum Province in Turkey. Its population is 40 (2022).
