= Evci, Boğazkale =

Village in Turkey

Evci
- Village
- Country: Turkey
- Province: Çorum
- District: Boğazkale
- Population (2022): 316
- Time zone: UTC+3 (TRT)

Evci is a village in the Boğazkale District of Çorum Province in Turkey. Its population is 316 (2022). Before the 2013 reorganisation, it was a town (belde).
