= Kadılıtürk, Boğazkale =

Village in Turkey

Kadılıtürk
- Village
- Location within Turkey
- Coordinates: 40°05′N 34°31′E
- Country: Turkey
- Province: Çorum
- District: Boğazkale
- Population (2022): 91
- Time zone: UTC+3 (TRT)

Kadılıtürk is a village in the Boğazkale District of Çorum Province in Turkey. Its population is 91 (2022).

== Name ==
The name of the village is given as Cadili turc or قاضيلي ترك in a 1928 government list. It is given as Kadılı ("old name Kadılıtürk") in a 1968 government list. Its name was apparently changed back to Kadılıtürk in 1987.

== Economy ==
The village economy is agriculture-based, with 3458 decares of planted land and 513 decares of fallow land, a cattle population of 228, a sheep and goat population of 58, and a poultry population of 101 (2023 figures).
