= Kaymaz, Boğazkale =

Village in Turkey

Kaymaz
- Village
- Location in Turkey
- Coordinates: 40°06′20″N 34°36′59″E
- Country: Turkey
- Province: Çorum
- District: Boğazkale
- Population (2022): 211
- Time zone: UTC+3 (TRT)

Kaymaz is a village in the Boğazkale District of Çorum Province in Turkey. Its population is 211 (2022).
