= Caucasus-Lower Volga =

Ancient population in the Caucasus

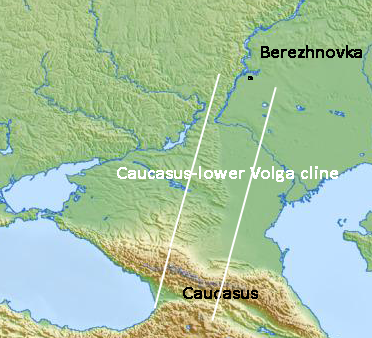
Caucasus-Lower Volga Cline

Caucasus-Lower Volga (CLV) was an ancient population who lived in the region between the lower Volga river and the Caucasus (c. 4500-3500 BCE). They were first identified in research on ancient DNA, through genetic studies on both their own ancient remains as well as those of later populations who were in part their descendants. They are described as having distal ancestral components related to Caucasus hunter-gatherers, Central Asians, Eastern hunter-gatherers and Neolithic West Asians. Their connection to later populations suggests that they were the speakers of the oldest reconstructed stage of Proto-Indo-European, prior to the split between the Anatolian branch and the rest of the Indo-European languages. (Note: Although it is widely accepted that the Anatolian branch was the first to separate, terminology varies across sources. The language that is ancestral to both the Anatolian and non-Anatolian Indo-European languages is sometimes referred to as "Proto-Indo-Anatolian" or "Proto-Indo-Hittite", in which case the term "Proto-Indo-European" is reserved for the most recent common ancestor of the non-Anatolian branch. However, other researchers use the term "Proto-Indo-European" for the most recent common ancestor of the whole family, with the non-Anatolian branch labeled as "Core Indo-European" or "Nuclear Indo-European" or "Late Indo-European".)

The discovery of this genetic cluster was significant because it appeared to resolve a major puzzle in the field of ancient DNA. While the early Indo-European languages appear to have been spread by groups with Western Steppe Herder admixture, no such genetic trace was evident in remains from speakers of the Anatolian languages, which belong to the Indo-European language family. Since linguistic evidence suggests that the Anatolian branch was the first to split off from Core Indo-European, one hypothesis was that this admixture occurred after that split. The discovery of the CLV cline appears to support this hypothesis since they contributed ancestry to both the Bronze Age Central Anatolians and the Yamnaya people who are generally regarded as the speakers of Core Proto-Indo-European.

The CLV population moved and admixed westwards in two main waves around 4,500 BCE: one combined with the Early European Farmer Trypillia culture to form the Usatove culture and the other mixed with hunter-gatherer communities (related to Balkan and Eastern hunter-gatherers) to form the [Sredny Stog], which within 500 years had formed the Yamnaya.
