= Boğazkale District =

District of Çorum Province, Turkey

- District
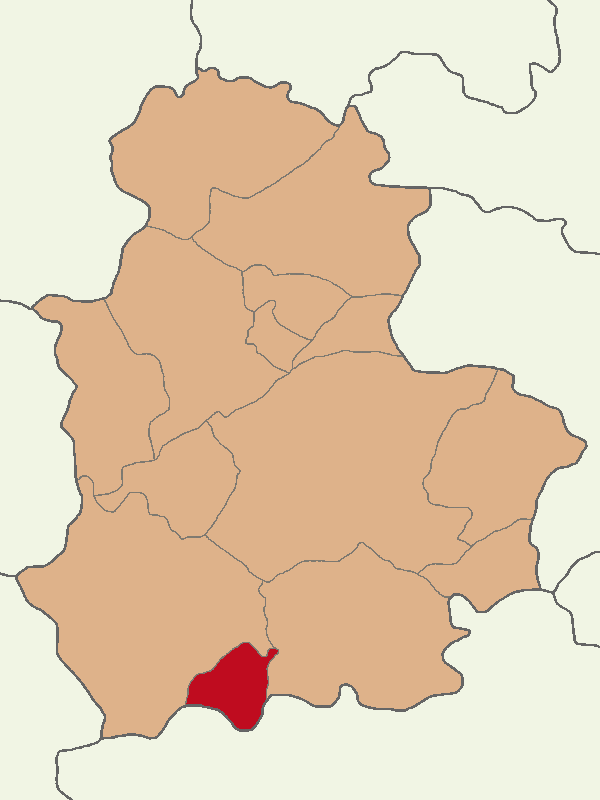
- Map showing Boğazkale District in Çorum Province

- Location in Turkey
- Coordinates: 40°01′N 34°37′E
- Country: Turkey
- Province: Çorum
- Seat: Boğazkale

Government
  - Kaymakam: Nazmi Yücel
- Area: 264 km^{2} (102 sq mi)
- Population (2022): 3,584
  - Density: 14/km^{2} (35/sq mi)
- Time zone: UTC+3 (TRT)
- Website: www.bogazkale.gov.tr

Boğazkale District is a district of the Çorum Province of Turkey. Its seat is the town of Boğazkale. Its area is 264 km^{2}, and its population is 3,584 (2022).

== Composition ==
There is one municipality in Boğazkale District:

- Boğazkale

There are 13 villages in Boğazkale District:

- Çarşıcuma
- Emirler
- Evci
- Gölpınarlar
- Kadılıtürk
- Karakeçili
- Kaymaz
- Örenkaya
- Sarıçiçek
- Yanıcak
- Yazır
- Yenikadılı
- Yukarıfındıklı

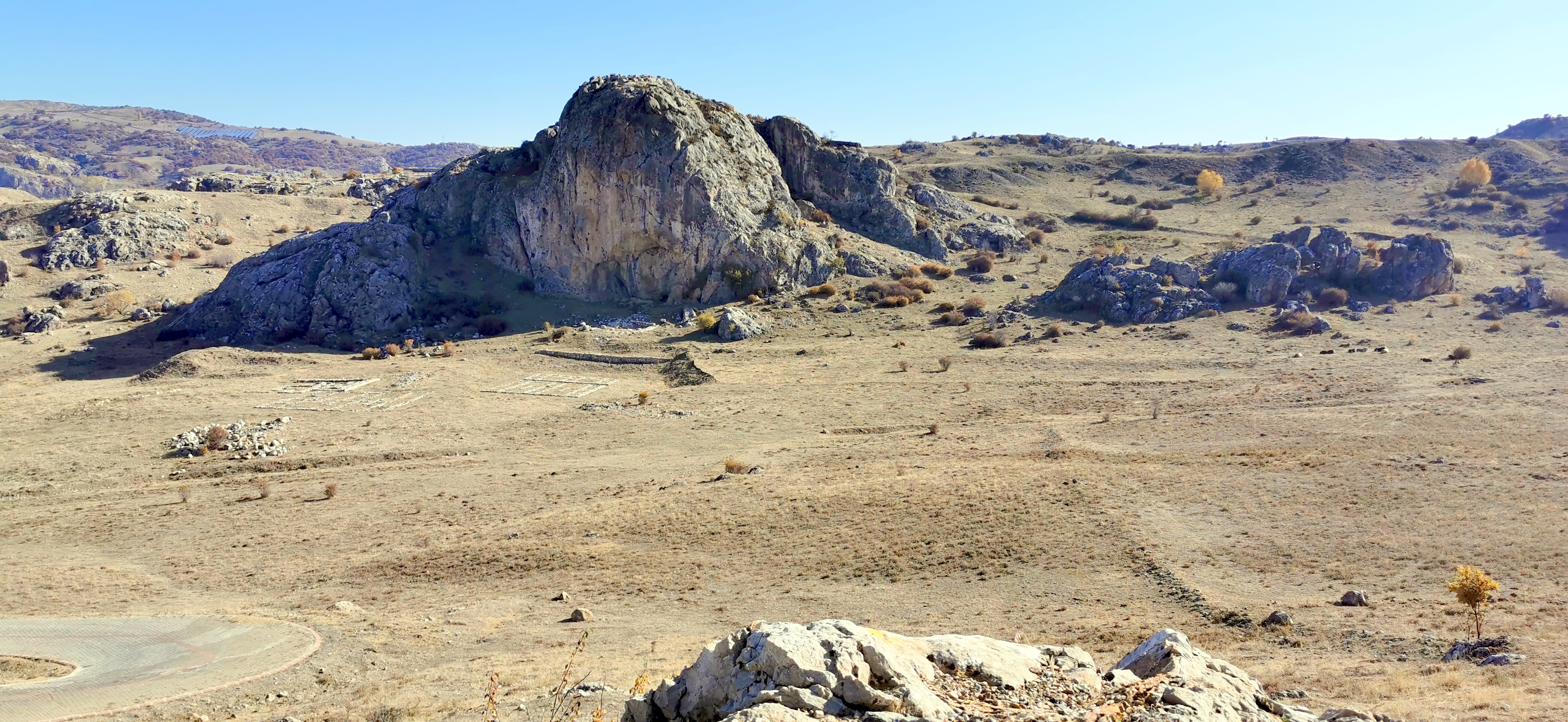
Hattusa, Boğazkale
