= Sarıçiçek, Boğazkale =

Village in Turkey

Sarıçiçek
- Village
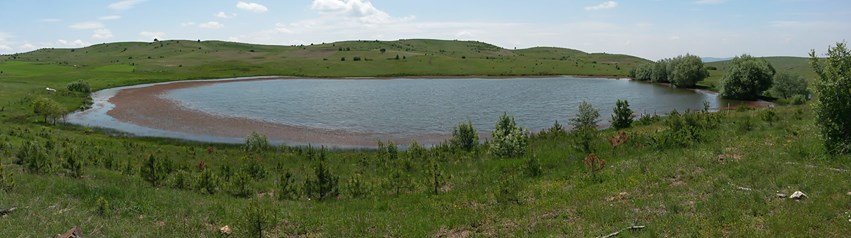

- Location within Turkey
- Country: Turkey
- Province: Çorum
- District: Boğazkale
- Population (2022): 115
- Time zone: UTC+3 (TRT)

Sarıçiçek is a village in the Boğazkale District of Çorum Province in Turkey. Its population is 115 (2022).
