= Theodore Makridi =

Greek archaeologist

Theodore Makridi Bey (1872–1940) was an Ottoman and Turkish - Greek archaeologist who conducted the first excavations of the Hittite capital, Hattusas. He was the second director of the Istanbul Archaeological Museum (then Imperial Ottoman Museum) after Osman Hamdi Bey.

He undertook excavations in Hattusas together with Hugo Winckler in 1906–1907 and 1911–1912. He was reportedly inept in controlling the excavations and unable to prevent theft of found items.

He continued to be employed by the state and pursued archeological excavations after the declaration of the Turkish Republic.
