= Boğazkale =

- Municipality
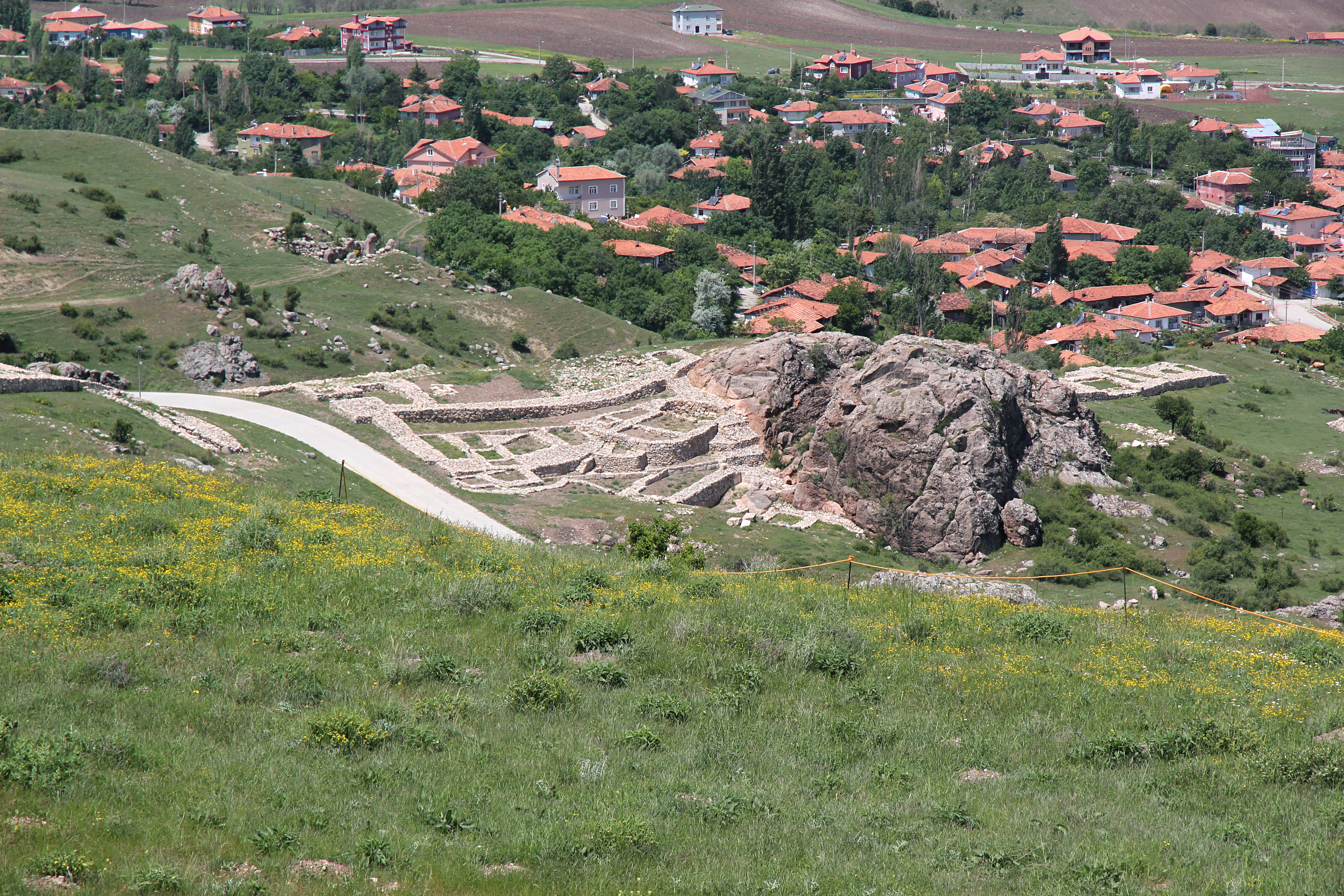
- View of Boğazkale from near the Kesikkaya (Split Rock), along with some ruins of the ancient city of Hattusa

- Location within Turkey
- Coordinates: 40°01′16″N 34°36′35″E
- Country: Turkey
- Province: Çorum
- District: Boğazkale

Government
  - Mayor: Adem Özel (AKP)
- Population (2022): 1,203
- Time zone: UTC+3 (TRT)
- Postal code: 19310
- Area code: 0364
- Climate: Dsb
- Website: www.bogazkale.bel.tr

Boğazkale ("Gorge Fortress") is a town of Çorum Province in the Black Sea region of Turkey, located 87 kilometres (54 mi) from the city of Çorum. It is the seat of Boğazkale District. Its population is 1,203 (2022). Formerly known as Boğazköy ("Gorge Village"), Boghaz Keui or Boghazköy, this small town (basically one street of shops) sits in a rural area on the road from Çorum to Yozgat. The town consists of 4 quarters: Yekbas, Çarşı, Hattusas and Hisar.

Boğazkale is the site of the ancient Hittite city Hattusa and its sanctuary Yazılıkaya. Because of its rich historic and architectural heritage, the town is a member of the Norwich-based European Association of Historic Towns and Regions (EAHTR).

== Gallery ==
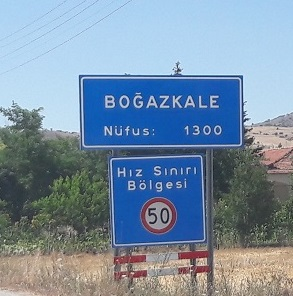

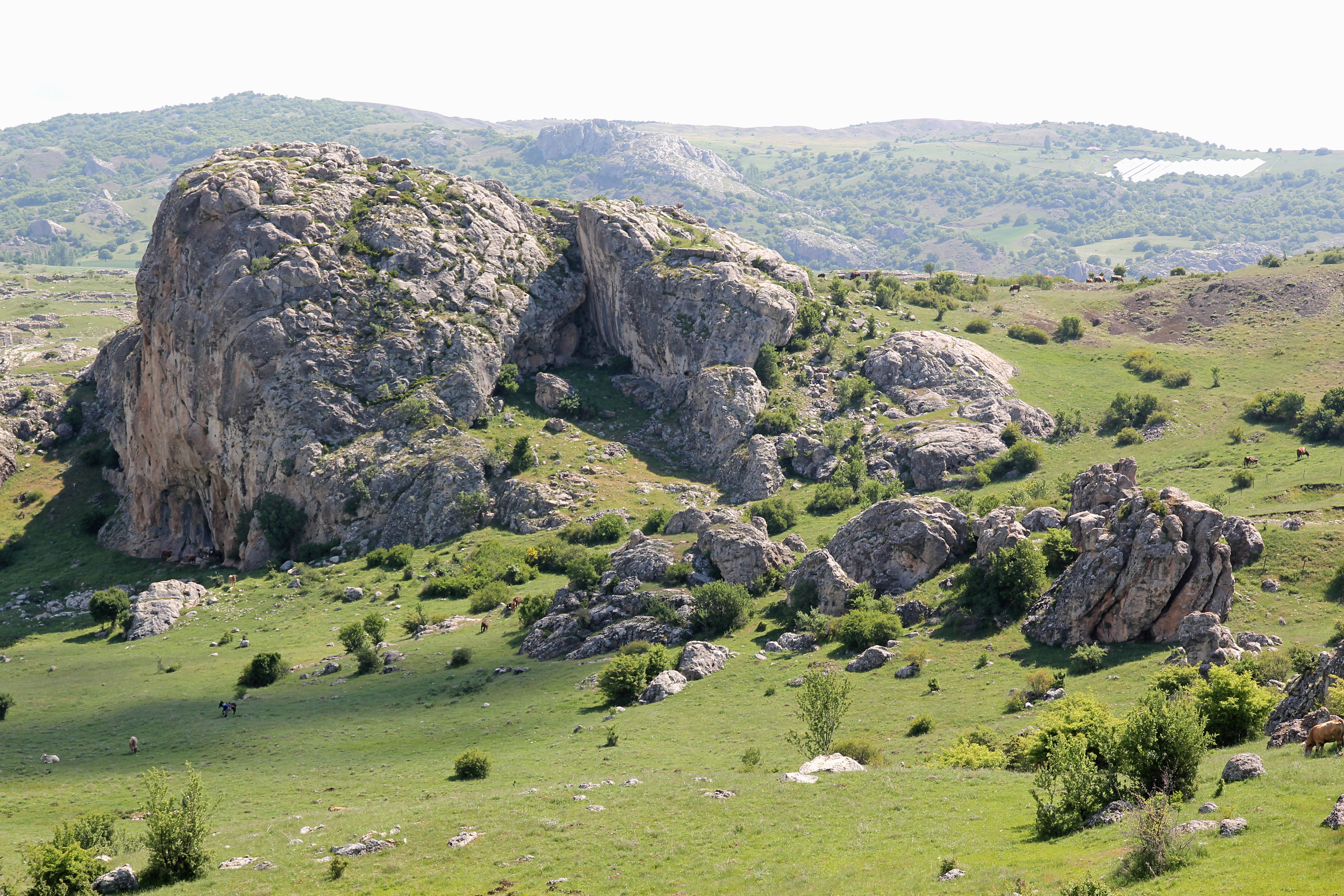
Sarıkale "Yellow Castle"

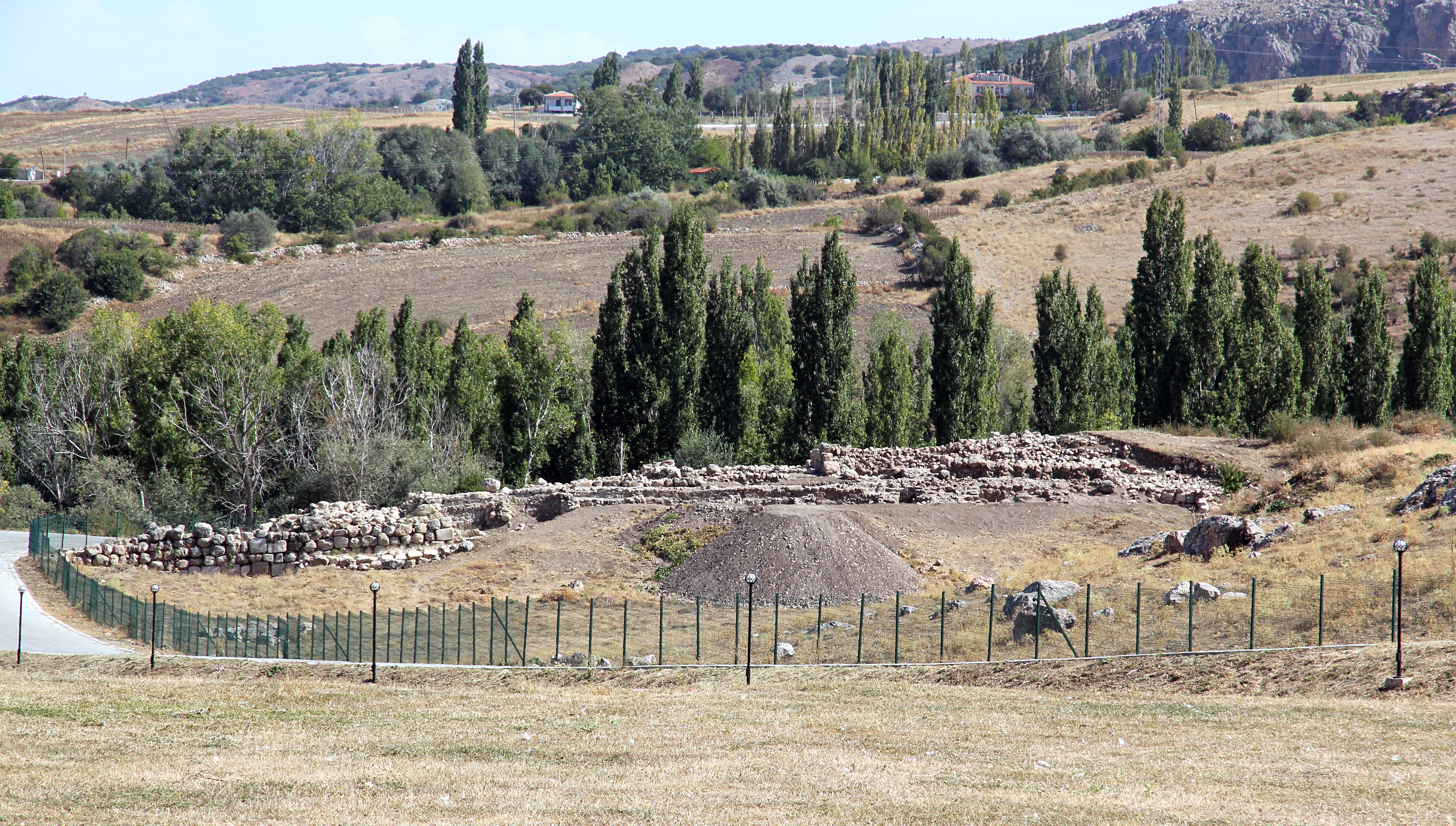
