= History of archaeological research in Anatolia =

The history of archaeological research in Anatolia and the territory of present-day Turkey spans several millennia and encompasses the remains of numerous ancient civilizations, settlements, monuments, and cultural landscapes. Anatolia and the surrounding regions were described by ancient historians, geographers, and travellers, who recorded information about cities, monuments, and other features of the landscape. However, the systematic study, documentation, and excavation of archaeological sites developed primarily from the nineteenth century onward, gradually transforming earlier antiquarian interest into a more organized archaeological discipline.

== 18th century ==
=== 1764–1766 – Chandler, Revett and Pars ===
The antiquarian Richard Chandler, architect Nicholas Revett and artist William Pars travelled to Greece and Asia Minor between 1764 and 1766. Unlike earlier antiquarian investigations , the expedition focused specifically on the systematic documentation of ancient architecture. The investigators measured surviving buildings, prepared architectural plans, recorded inscriptions, produced detailed drawings, documented architectural decoration, and compared the archaeological remains with descriptions preserved in ancient literary sources. In western Anatolia they investigated major ancient cities including Ephesus, Miletus, Priene, Didyma and Teos.

== 19th century ==
The nineteenth century marked a transition from antiquarian exploration toward more systematic archaeological investigation in Anatolia. Expeditions increasingly involved architects, artists, epigraphists, and archaeologists, while excavation became an important method for documenting and interpreting ancient sites. At the same time, the Ottoman government established archaeological institutions and introduced legislation aimed at regulating excavations, antiquities, and the removal of archaeological finds from Ottoman territory.

=== 1838 – Charles Fellows and Lycia ===
British traveller Charles Fellows explored southwestern Anatolia and the region of ancient Lycia. His investigations included the ancient city of Xanthos, where he documented monumental tombs, sculptures and architectural remains. Fellows' expeditions contributed to growing interest in Lycian archaeology, and numerous sculptures and architectural fragments documented during his expeditions were subsequently transferred to the British Museum.

=== 1856 – Early investigations at Hisarlık ===
Archaeological investigations of the Hisarlik mound, widely identified with the site of ancient Troy, preceded the excavations conducted by Heinrich Schliemann in Hisarlik. In the 1850s, Frank Calvert investigated the mound.

=== 1863–1874 – John Turtle Wood and Ephesus ===
British architect John Turtle Wood began excavations at Ephesus in 1863 with the principal objective of locating the ancient Temple of Artemis. After several years of investigation, Wood's excavations located the remains of the Artemision in 1869.

=== 1869 – Establishment of the Imperial Museum ===
The Ottoman government formally established the Müze-i Hümayun (Imperial Museum) in 1869.

=== 1869 – First Ottoman Antiquities Regulation ===
The Ottoman government issued an antiquities regulation in 1869, establishing an early legal framework for the administration of archaeological discoveries and antiquities. Further regulations followed in 1874 and 1884, progressively strengthening state control.

=== 1870 – Heinrich Schliemann at Hisarlık ===
Heinrich Schliemann began large-scale excavations at the Hisarlık in 1870, seeking the remains of the city described in Homer's Iliad. His excavations revealed a sequence of successive settlement layers at the site.

=== 1873 – Miletus ===
A French expedition conducted archaeological work at Miletus in 1873, including excavation of the ancient theatre.

=== 1878 – German excavations at Pergamon ===
Large-scale German excavations at Pergamon began in 1878, led by Carl Humann with the involvement of archaeologist Alexander Conze. The excavations uncovered major monuments on the acropolis, including the Great Altar of Pergamon and its monumental sculptural decoration.

=== 1883 – Osman Hamdi Bey's expedition to Nemrut Dağı ===
In 1883, Osman Hamdi Bey and Osgan Efendi travelled to Nemrut Dağı and conducted archaeological investigations of the site. The expedition was organized by the Ottoman government and represented an early example of archaeological fieldwork undertaken by Ottoman officials and scholars.

=== 1895–1898 – Excavation of Priene ===
German archaeologists excavated Priene between 1895 and 1898. The investigations documented the city's streets, public buildings, sanctuaries, water systems and residential areas.

== 20th century ==
Following the discovery of cuneiform tablets at Boğazköy during nineteenth-century investigations, further tablets were recovered in the early twentieth century. Between 1901 and 1905, German scholar Waldemar Belck visited the site several times and discovered additional cuneiform material. The discoveries contributed to the identification of Boğazköy as the site of Hattusa, the capital of the Hittite Empire.

=== 1907- Alacahöyük ===
In 1907, Ottoman archaeologist Theodor Makridi Bey, working on behalf of the Imperial Museum, conducted investigations at Alacahöyük, including work at the site's monumental Sphinx Gate.

=== 1910–1914 — Sardis ===
In 1910, American archaeologist Howard Crosby Butler began large-scale excavations at Sardis, the ancient capital of Lydia. Conducted with the support of the Ottoman Imperial Museum and funded by the American Society for the Excavation of Sardis, the expedition continued through 1914 and investigated the Temple of Artemis, parts of its precinct, and the ancient necropolis, where more than 1,100 tombs were excavated.

=== 1961–1965 — Çatalhöyük ===
Systematic excavations at Çatalhöyük began in 1961 under the direction of James Mellaart and continued through 1965. Excavations revealed densely packed Neolithic houses containing wall paintings, reliefs, figurines, pottery, burials, and a range of domestic installations, providing evidence for the settlement’s architecture, material culture, and burial practices.

=== 1986 — Hattusa becomes a UNESCO World Heritage Site ===
In 1986, Hattusa, the capital of the Hittite Empire, was inscribed on the UNESCO World Heritage List. The site includes the remains of the ancient city's temples, royal residences, fortifications, monumental gates, and the rock sanctuary of Yazılıkaya.

=== 1987 — Nemrut Dagi ===
In 1987, Nemrut Dağı was inscribed on the UNESCO World Heritage List.

=== 1988 — Hierapolis, Xanthos-Letoon and further heritage recognition ===
In 1988, Hierapolis-Pamukkale and Xanthos-Letoon were inscribed on the UNESCO World Heritage List.

=== 1995 — Göbekli Tepe ===
In 1995, systematic excavations at Göbekli Tepe in southeastern Anatolia began under the direction of German archaeologist Klaus Schmidt, following earlier surveys conducted by Istanbul University and the German Archaeological Institute. The excavations revealed monumental T-shaped limestone pillars and associated structures dating to the Pre-Pottery Neolithic period.

=== 1998 — Archaeological Site of Troy becomes a UNESCO World Heritage Site ===
In 1998, the Archaeological Site of Troy was inscribed on the UNESCO World Heritage List.

== 21st century ==
In March 2024, researchers announced the identification of an approximately 8,600-year-old piece of fermented bread at Çatalhöyük, a major Neolithic settlement in the Çumra district of Konya Province, central Türkiye. The discovery was made in an area designated Mekan 66, which contains interconnected mudbrick houses. The organic remains had originally been recovered in 2021 from the corner of a partly destroyed oven-like structure. Nearby deposits included wheat, barley and pea seeds. The object was a small, round, palm-sized mass with a spongy texture and a depression in its centre. Scanning electron microscopy revealed air spaces and starch grains, while chemical analysis identified plant compounds and indicators of fermentation. The presence of cereal residues, including wheat and barley, supported its identification as bread. Radiocarbon dating conducted at the TÜBİTAK Marmara Research Center indicated a date of approximately 6600 BC.

In September 2024, archaeologists announced the discovery of three bronze shields and a decorated bronze helmet during excavations at Ayanis Castle, located in the Tuşba district of Van Province, eastern Türkiye. The four artefacts were recovered approximately six to seven metres below the surface, on the floor of a room within the fortress. Despite the damage caused by an ancient earthquake that resulted in the collapse of the fortress's mudbrick walls, the shields and helmet were found in relatively good condition. The helmet features elaborate decorative elements, leading archaeologists to suggest that it may have been used in ceremonial activities rather than exclusively in warfare. The objects are believed to have been associated with Haldi, the principal deity of the Urartian pantheon, who was closely connected with the monarchy and military campaigns.

In September 2024, archaeologists excavating the ancient port of Andriake, which served the Lycian city of Myra in present-day Demre, Antalya Province, Türkiye, uncovered hundreds of fragments of decorative glass plaques made using the millefiori technique. The plaques, decorated with intricate floral and geometric patterns, were found in Room 42 in the port’s agora customs area and are dated to the fifth–sixth centuries AD on the basis of associated coins and pottery. Researchers believe they were used as luxurious interior wall decorations in a prominent building, possibly the port’s administrative centre. The excavation also revealed glass rosettes and decorative figures of birds, camels and saints made using the opus sectile technique.

In March 2025, restoration work on the Western Theatre of ancient Laodicea, near Denizli in southwestern Turkey, was reported as completed after a project initiated in 2019 under archaeologist Celal Şimşek of Pamukkale University. Constructed in the 2nd century BCE, the theatre had a diameter of approximately 96 metres and could accommodate around 15,000 spectators. It was repaired and rebuilt following several earthquakes, including the earthquake of 368 CE, before suffering further damage in 494 CE. The restoration included the theatre’s seating tiers, while work on the stage building and its architectural elements formed part of the wider conservation programme.

In July 2025, archaeological excavations at Salkaya in Elazığ Province, eastern Turkey, revealed a Roman bath complex dating to approximately 1,700 years ago. Covering about 75 m², the bathhouse contains separate hot, warm and cold rooms, a hypocaust underfloor-heating system, sweat rooms, pools, and channels for fresh and wastewater. The structure was first investigated after a farmer discovered a Roman mosaic while planting trees in 2023, after which ground-penetrating radar identified the larger complex, excavations in 2024 confirmed the bathhouse.

In July 2025, archaeologists from Van Yüzüncü Yıl University identified a large fortified settlement on the Tirişin Plateau near Beşbudak village in Van's Gürpınar district, at an elevation of around 3,000 metres. The complex includes an inner fortress, nearly 50 rooms or living spaces, and approximately 4 kilometres of stone defensive walls constructed largely from local basalt. Archaeological evidence indicates that the area was used during multiple periods, including the Iron Age and medieval period, while rock art in the wider area points to much earlier human activity. Circular structures resembling kurgans and evidence associated with pastoralism were also recorded, suggesting that the settlement may have served both defensive and pastoral functions.

In August 2025, an archaeological team led by Arkadiusz Marciniak of Adam Mickiewicz University in Poznań, Poland, reported evidence of a possible mortuary building in the eastern sector of Çatalhöyük, a Neolithic settlement in central Turkey. Excavations revealed the remains of 20 individuals buried beneath the floor of a structure that researchers believe was used for funerary or ritual purposes rather than as a domestic residence. Nearby buildings also contained human remains beneath platforms, one structure featured painted walls and 14 platforms and may have served ceremonial functions.

In October 2025, a rescue excavation beneath a historic water mill in Midyat district, in southeastern Turkey, revealed a mosaic floor dating to approximately the 6th century CE. Around 40 square metres of mosaic were exposed across two interior spaces, decorated with geometric shapes, interlacing knots, waves, crosses and infinity motifs. An inscription reading “Tittos Domestikos” was also found. Tittos appears to be a personal name, while domestikos was a title used in Byzantine military and ecclesiastical contexts. The inscription has led archaeologists to suggest that the building may have been associated with an administrative official, although its precise function remains uncertain.

In November 2025, archaeologists excavating Sefertepe, a Pre-Pottery Neolithic site in Şanlıurfa Province, southeastern Turkey, uncovered two human-face reliefs estimated to be approximately 10,000 years old. The faces were carved into limestone blocks forming a platform believed to have had a ceremonial function. One face was executed in high relief, with carefully defined eyes, eyebrows, nose, mouth and ears, while the other was carved in low relief and features closed eyes and more simplified facial features. Both faces are oriented north. Led by archaeologist Emre Güldoğan of Istanbul University, the excavations form part of the Taş Tepeler Neolithic research project.

In December 2025, a shepherd grazing goats near Kayacık in the Seydikemer district of Muğla, southwestern Turkey, discovered an altar-shaped Roman funerary stele dating to the 1st–3rd centuries CE. The approximately 300-kilogram stone monument features reliefs of a man and a woman on its front, interpreted as a possible family portrait, alongside an inscription containing information about the deceased. Wreath motifs carved on its sides may have symbolised honour or distinction. Due to the steep, rocky terrain, archaeologists and workers spent approximately seven hours transporting the stele to the Fethiye Museum, where it was scheduled for cleaning, conservation and public display.

In January 2026, archaeological excavations at the North Street of Smyrna’s Agora in İzmir, Turkey, revealed a mosaic floor dating to the 4th–6th centuries CE. The approximately 3 × 4 metre mosaic contains interlocking 12-sided geometric panels, plant motifs, small cross designs and a central Solomon’s knot. Archaeologists have not yet established whether the building was a private residence or a public space. The area was subsequently reused during the 19th century, when later structures were built over the ancient mosaic.

In January 2026, a hiker discovered a series of prehistoric rock paintings on exposed rock surfaces in the Kayseri region of central Turkey. The paintings depict human-shaped figures interpreted as possible female, male and family figures, and experts noted similarities with prehistoric rock art from other parts of Anatolia, including Hakkari, Van, Mersin, Antalya and Çatalhöyük. The paintings have been provisionally estimated to date to around 6000 BCE, although their chronology remains uncertain and is to be investigated through pigment analysis, surface-erosion studies and comparisons with other prehistoric rock art.

In January 2026, researchers reported evidence of an early cranial surgical procedure on a human skull from İkiztepe Höyüğü near Samsun in northern Turkey, dating to approximately 5,000 years ago. The skull displays an intentionally made surgical opening with healed bone edges, indicating that the individual survived the operation for a period afterward. The find adds to evidence for prehistoric surgical practices in Anatolia, alongside earlier examples reported from sites such as Aşıklı Höyük and Çatalhöyük.

In January 2026, archaeologists excavating the ancient city of Lystra in Konya, central Turkey, recovered an intact bronze reliquary cross from a burial area associated with a church. The two-part cross, dated to the 9th–11th centuries CE, bears geometric decoration and was permanently sealed using rivets, preventing it from being opened without damaging the object. Archaeologists reported that a small gap revealed no identifiable contents, although a piece of shroud-like fabric was visible, the cross was cleaned and conserved by specialists without being opened.

In February 2026, previously undocumented underground spaces were documented beneath Molla Zeyrek Mosque in Istanbul’s Fatih district, which occupies the former Byzantine Pantokrator Monastery complex. The subterranean structures include vaulted chambers, narrow corridors and a large cistern or water-storage system, reflecting the infrastructure associated with major Byzantine institutional complexes. The passages have not yet been fully mapped, and their precise functions and connections remain uncertain, although they may have served water management, storage and logistical purposes.

In February 2026, archaeological cleaning and documentation carried out during restoration at Hagia Sophia in Istanbul revealed a network of seven underground tunnel lines dating to approximately 1,600 years ago, corresponding to the early Byzantine period. The tunnels extend for hundreds of metres and are connected to three underground chambers in the western garden and northern façade areas. More than 1,000 tonnes of soil fill were removed during the work, while researchers documented the structures using archaeological surveys and digital methods.

In March 2026, archaeologists working in the Tur Abdin region of Mardin, southeastern Turkey, documented Şika Rika 5, a settlement dating to the Late Epipalaeolithic and Pre-Pottery Neolithic periods, approximately 12,000–10,000 years ago. The site contains circular structures, predominantly flint tools, obsidian, numerous lunates, grinding stones and pestles, animal remains, and ornamental beads. These finds indicate a mixed subsistence economy involving hunting, gathering and the processing of wild plants, while the settlement's architecture suggests that people were living in semi-permanent or permanent communities before agriculture became fully established.

In March 2026, gendarmerie search-and-rescue divers documented submerged structures beneath the Dicle Dam in the Eğil district of Diyarbakır, southeastern Turkey. The underwater remains include rock-cut tombs, a mosque, a madrasa, a cemetery and a bathhouse, while some structures have been dated to around 2,400 years ago, indicating a long sequence of occupation in the area.

In April 2026, archaeologists excavating the Western Theater of ancient Laodicea in Denizli, southwestern Turkey, uncovered a nearly 2-metre-high marble statue of Athena lying face-down in rubble along the outer wall of the stage building. The head has not been recovered, while the statue depicts Athena standing on a round base and wearing a sleeveless peplos, a cloak known as a hylamis, and an aegis decorated with the head of Medusa and serpents. Its artistic style has been dated to the Augustan period (27 BCE–14 CE), and the roughly finished back indicates that it was intended to stand between columns. The discovery adds to the sculptural decoration of Laodicea’s Western Theater, where statues depicting gods, rulers and scenes from Homeric epics have also been found.

In July 2026, an international team led by Ondokuz Mayıs University began the excavation season at the ancient city of Parion near Kemer in Çanakkale, northwestern Turkey. Excavations focused on the Agora, where an outer portico wall and associated remains dating to the Archaic, Classical and Hellenistic periods were investigated, and the South Necropolis, where archaeologists continued work on a monumental square-plan tomb structure. The project also included conservation and documentation of finds, as well as further research into the ancient harbor and a presumed Ottoman period shipyard based on underwater surveys conducted in previous seasons.

In July 2026, researchers from the Austrian Academy of Sciences published new bioarchaeological analyses of a burial containing two perinatal infants discovered in 2010 within the Odeion at Ephesus, near the ancient sanctuary of Artemis in western Turkey. Radiocarbon dating places the burial in the 8th–9th centuries CE, several centuries after the Roman building’s abandonment, the grave had been constructed from bricks and stones inside a latrine channel originally built in the 2nd–3rd centuries CE. The infants were buried side by side, with their heads facing west, and osteological analysis indicates that they died at approximately 33–34 weeks of gestation. Their similar developmental age suggests they may have been twins, although DNA analysis would be required to confirm this. One infant also had an additional cervical rib, a rare skeletal variation. The careful construction of the grave and evidence that the bodies may have been wrapped in shrouds suggest a deliberate burial rather than disposal, providing evidence for Middle Byzantine attitudes towards perinatal death and infant funerary practices.

In August 2026, archaeologists excavating the eastern necropolis of ancient Aspendos in southern Turkey, uncovered a stone-lined grave dating to approximately 475–300 BCE. The burial contained a skeleton and locally minted silver coins featuring two wrestlers, a motif associated with Aspendos. Although the coins have led to the suggestion that the deceased may have been a wrestler or otherwise connected with athletics, researchers have stressed that the evidence is not sufficient to establish the individual's profession, further osteological analysis, including examination for physical trauma associated with athletic activity, may provide additional evidence.

In August 2026, archaeologists identified a large fortified settlement near Mescidli village in Muş Province, eastern Turkey, after satellite imagery revealed unusual structural features. The fortress covers approximately 120,000 m² and is surrounded by around 1.4 km of defensive walls, which survive up to approximately 4 m high externally. Its cyclopean and polygonal masonry resembles Early Iron Age fortresses such as Aşağı Anzaf and Zivistan, suggesting a connection with the early Urartian period.

In August 2026, excavations on the northwestern slope of Hattusa uncovered three tombs dating to the late 4th–3rd centuries BCE, during the Early Hellenistic and Galatian periods. The best-preserved burial was surrounded by a circular stone structure approximately 7 metres in diameter and contained an intact skeleton with a knife positioned beside the right shoulder. The cemetery is relatively sparse, and the newly discovered graves bring the number of known burials from this period at Hattusa to 17, providing additional evidence for funerary practices during a less well-documented phase of the site's history.

In November 2026, archaeologists announced further discoveries at the ancient city of Pompeiopolis, located in the Taşköprü district of Kastamonu Province, northern Türkiye. Excavations during the 2026 archaeological season revealed an extensive Roman mosaic inside a monumental basilica, together with a sculpted head of Eros. Pompeiopolis was an important urban centre in ancient Paphlagonia and served as the region's capital during the Roman Imperial period. The mosaic covers approximately 120–130 square metres and consists of geometric decorative compositions. It was uncovered across the central and eastern aisles of the basilica and dates to approximately the fourth century AD. The pavement is relatively well preserved, although some sections require conservation to stabilise damaged areas and secure individual tesserae.

In November 2026, archaeologists announced the discovery of eight carbonised loaves of bread dating to approximately 5,000 years ago at Seyitömer Mound in Kütahya Province, western Türkiye. The finds were recovered during rescue excavations in a room containing an oven and traces of shelving. The bread was found between the supports of the collapsed shelf, alongside remains of wheat and lentils. The archaeological context suggests that the food had been stored in the room when a fire destroyed the building. According to the excavation team, the shelf may have held bread and agricultural produce stored in sacks or bags. During the fire, the shelving collapsed, depositing its contents on the floor. The intense heat carbonised the organic material, allowing the loaves and plant remains to survive despite their age.

== See also ==
- Prehistory of Anatolia
