= Hattusa =

Capital of the Hittite Empire

- 𒌷𒄩𒀜𒌅𒊭 Ḫattuša (Hittite); Hattuşaş (Turkish)
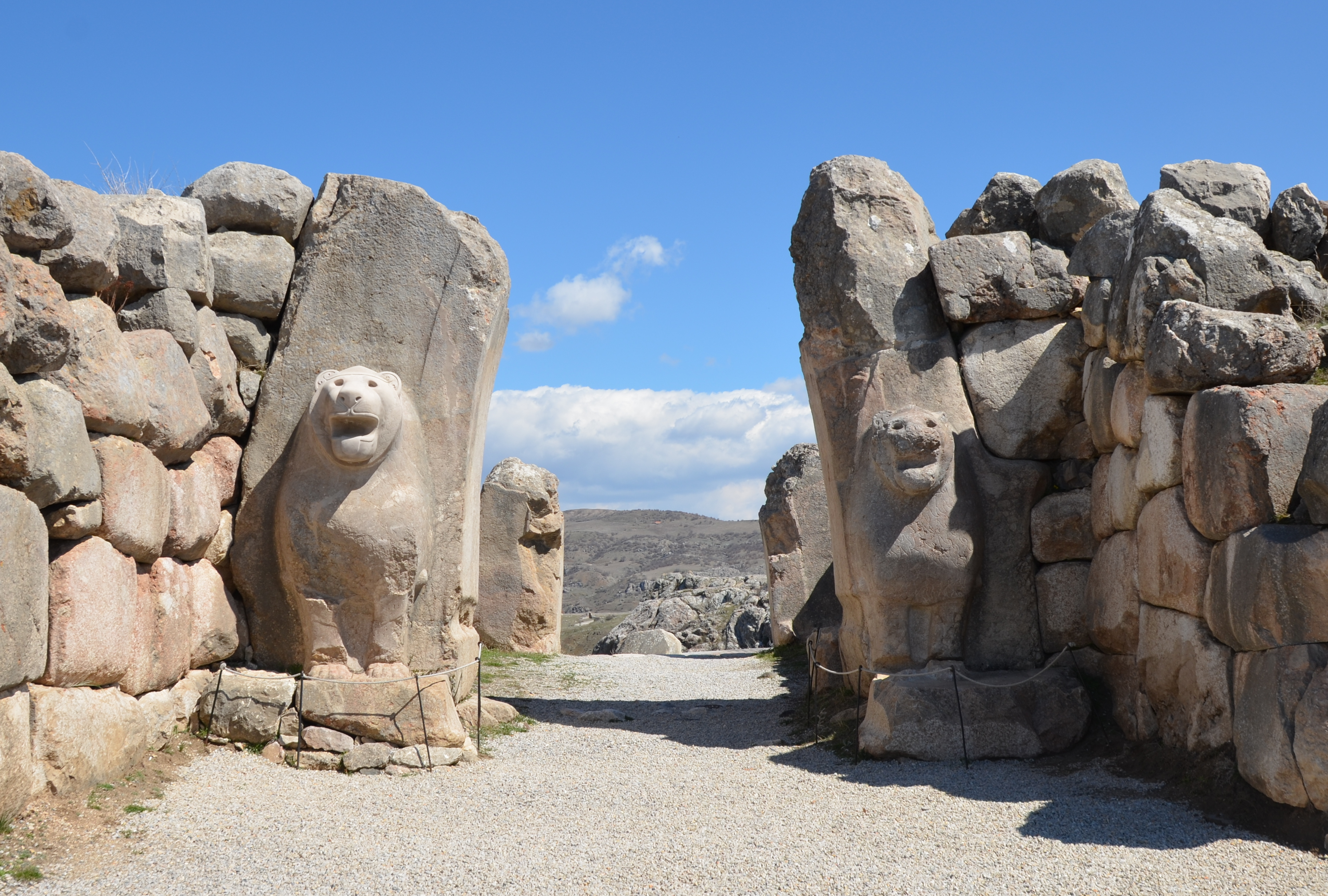
- The Lion Gate in the south-west

- Location within Turkey
- 40°01′11″N 34°36′55″E
- Type: Settlement
- Periods: Bronze Age
- Cultures: Hittite
- Location: Near Boğazkale, Çorum Province, Turkey
- Region: Anatolia

History
- Built: 6th millennium BC
- Abandoned: c. 1180 BC

Site notes
- Condition: In ruins

UNESCO World Heritage Site
- Official name: Hattusha: the Hittite Capital
- Criteria: Cultural: i, ii, iii, iv
- Reference: 377
- Inscription: 1986 (10th Session)
- Area: 268.46 ha (663.4 acres)

Hattusa, also Hattuşa, Ḫattuša, Hattusas, or Hattusha, was the capital of the Hittite Empire in the late Bronze Age during two distinct periods. Its ruins lie near modern Boğazkale, Turkey (originally Boğazköy), within the great loop of the Kızılırmak River (Hittite: Marashantiya; Greek: Halys).

French archeologist Charles Texier brought attention to the ruins after his visit in 1834. Over the following century, sporadic exploration occurred, involving different archaeologists. The German Oriental Society and the German Archaeological Institute began systematic excavations in the early 20th century which continue to this day. Hattusa was added to the UNESCO World Heritage Site list in 1986.

== History ==
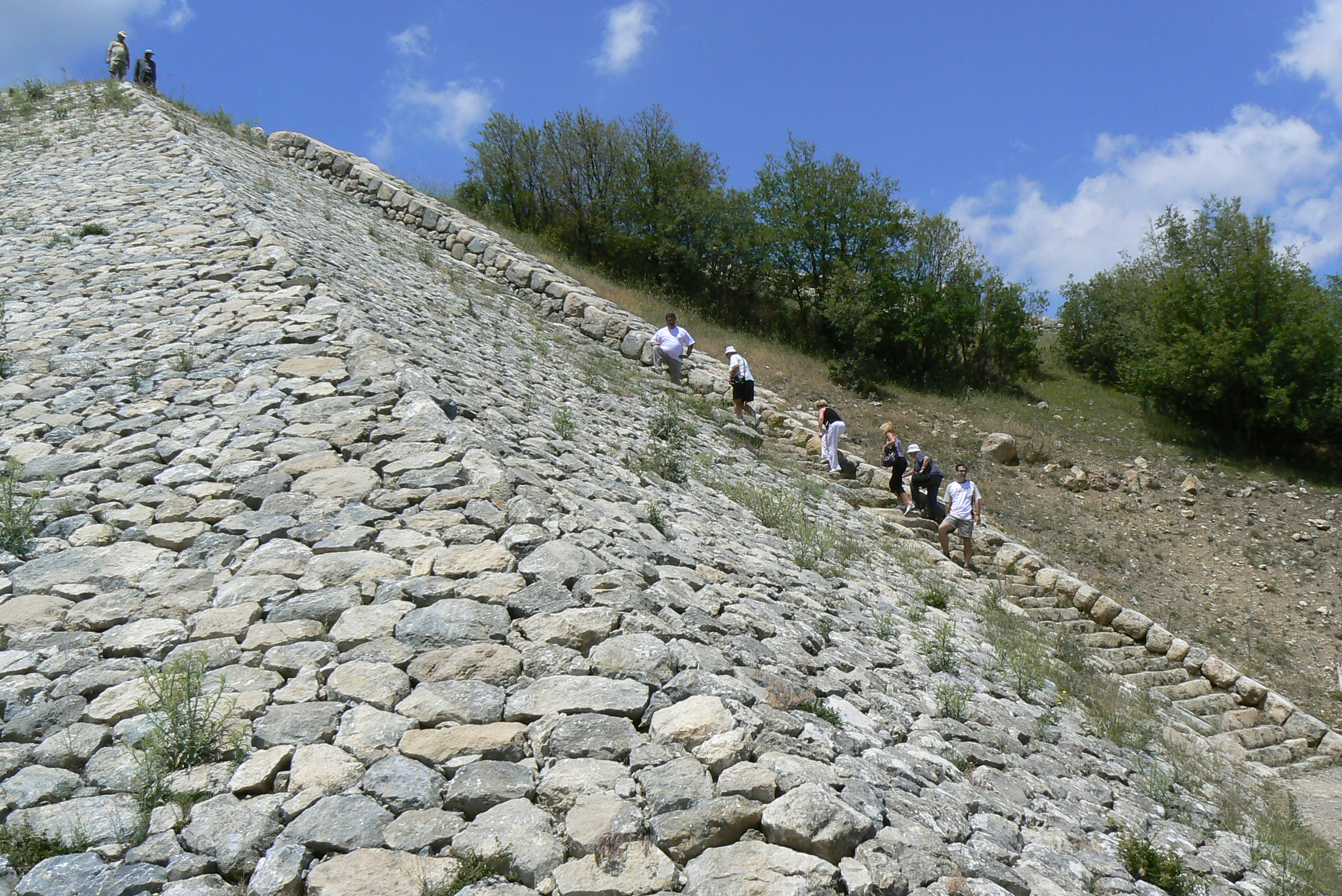
Hattusa rampart

The earliest traces of settlement on the site are from the 6th millennium BC during the Chalcolithic period. Toward the end of the 3rd millennium BC the Hattian people established a settlement on locations that had been occupied even earlier and referred to the site as Hattush. In the 19th and 18th centuries BC, merchants from Assyria, centered at Kanesh (Neša) (modern Kültepe) established a trading post there, setting up in their own separate quarter of the lower city.

A carbonized layer apparent in excavations attests to the burning and ruin of the city of Hattusa around 1700 BC. The responsible party appears to have been King Anitta from Kussara, who took credit for the act and erected an inscribed curse for good measure:

Whoever after me becomes king resettles Hattusas, let the Stormgod of the Sky strike him!

Nevertheless the city was rebuilt, possibly by a son of Anitta.

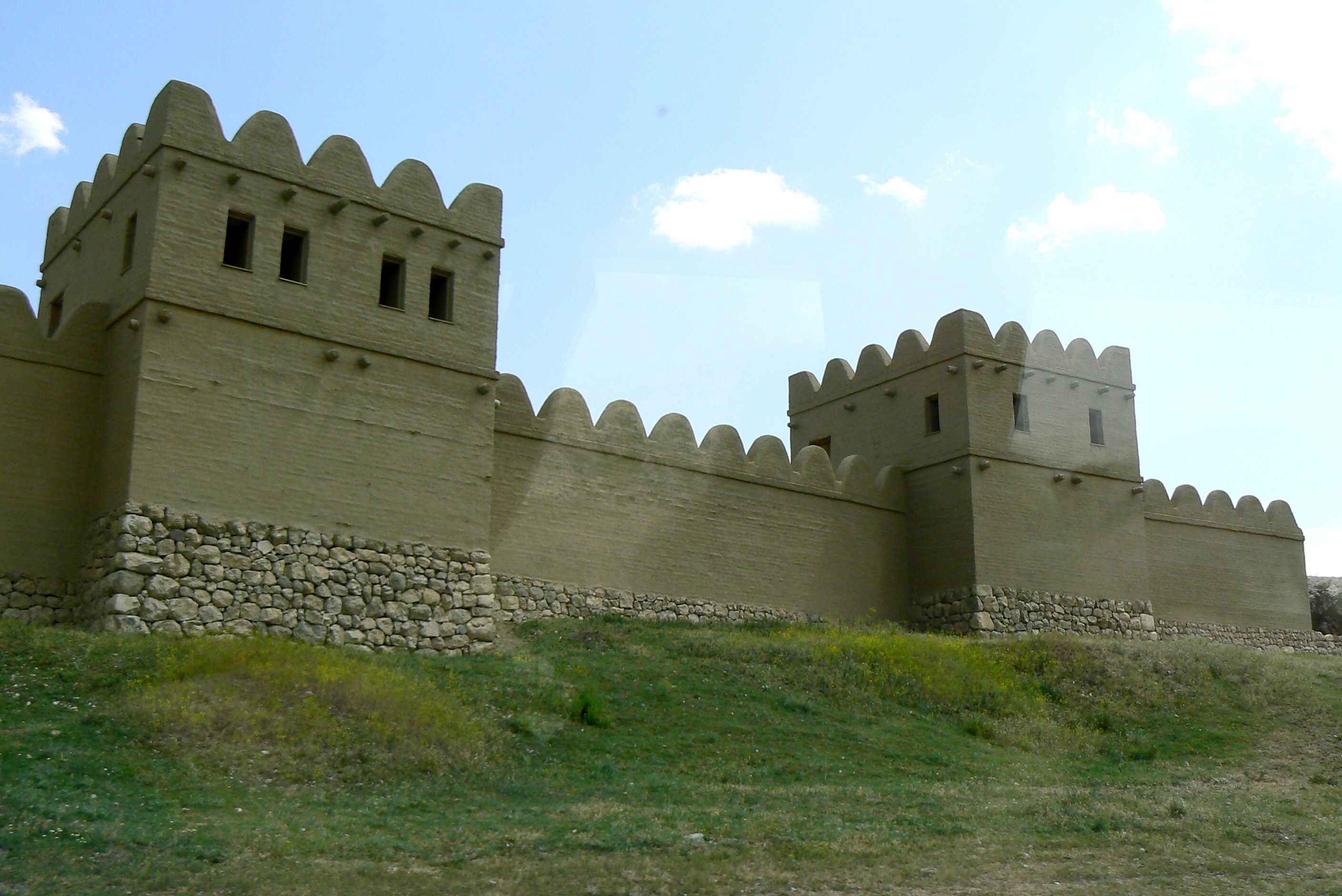
Reconstructed city walls of Hattusa

Around 1650 BC, the Hittite king Labarna moved the capital from Neša to Hattusa and took the name of Hattusili, the "one/man from Hattusa". After the Kaskians arrived to the kingdom's north, they twice attacked the city and under king Tudhaliya I, the Hittites moved the capital north to Sapinuwa. Under Muwatalli II, they moved south to Tarhuntassa but the king assigned his younger brother, the future Hattusili III as governor over Hattusa. In the mid-13th century BC Hittite ruler Mursili III returned the seat to Hattusa, where the capital remained until the end of the Hittite kingdom in the 12th century BC (KBo 21.15 i 11–12).

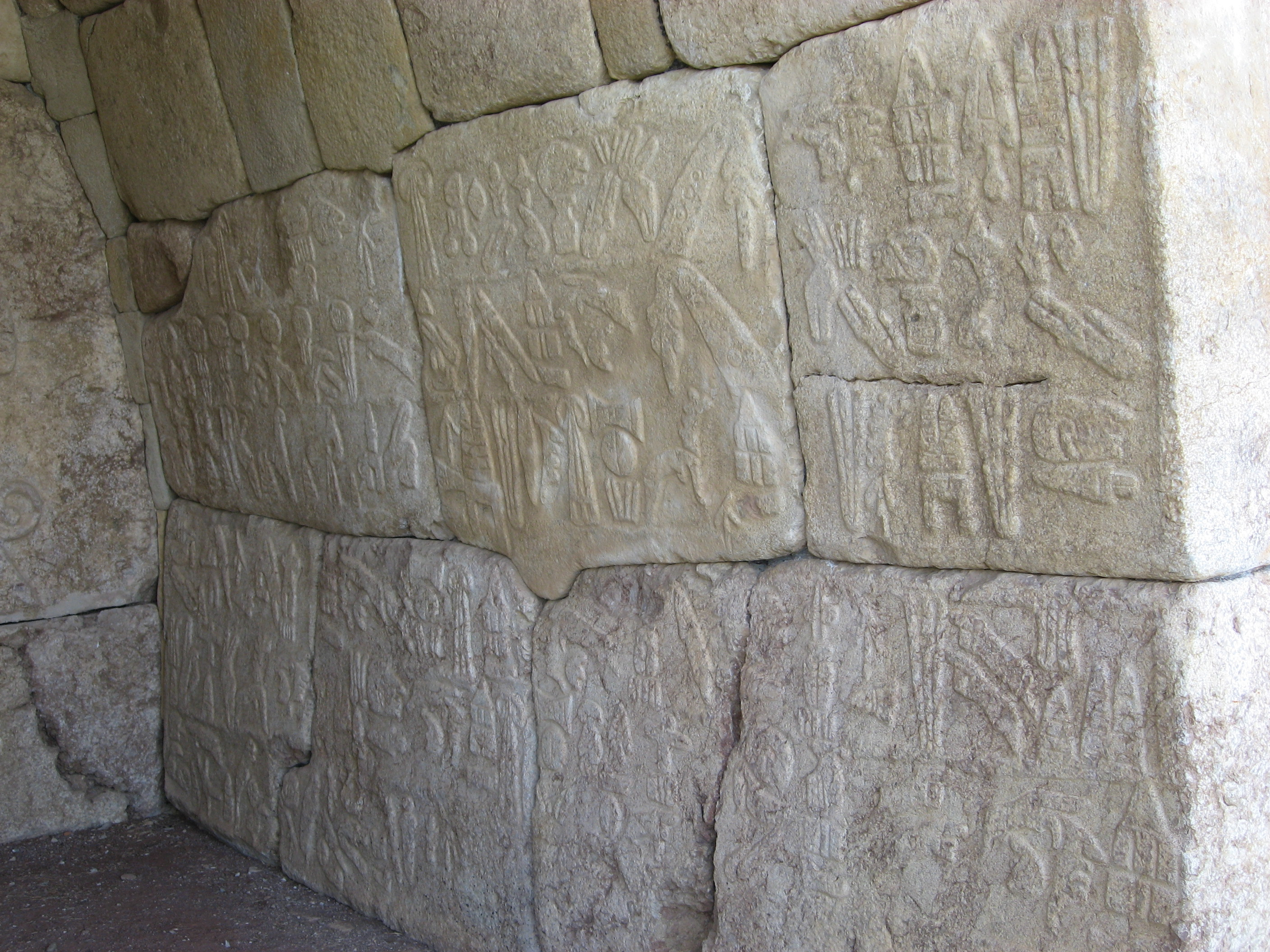
Reliefs and Hieroglyphs from Chamber 2 at Hattusa built and decorated by Suppiluliuma II, the last king of the Hittites

At its peak, the city covered 1.8 km^{2} (440 acres) and comprised an inner and outer portion, both surrounded by a massive and still visible course of walls erected during the reign of Suppiluliuma I c. 1344–1322 BC. The inner city covered an area of some 0.8 km^{2} (200 acres) and was occupied by a citadel with large administrative buildings and temples. The royal residence, or acropolis, was built on a high ridge now known as Büyükkale (Great Fortress). The city displayed over 6 km (3.7 mi) of walls, with inner and outer layers around 3 m (9.8 ft) thick and 2 m (6 ft 7 in) of space between, totalling 8 m (26 ft).

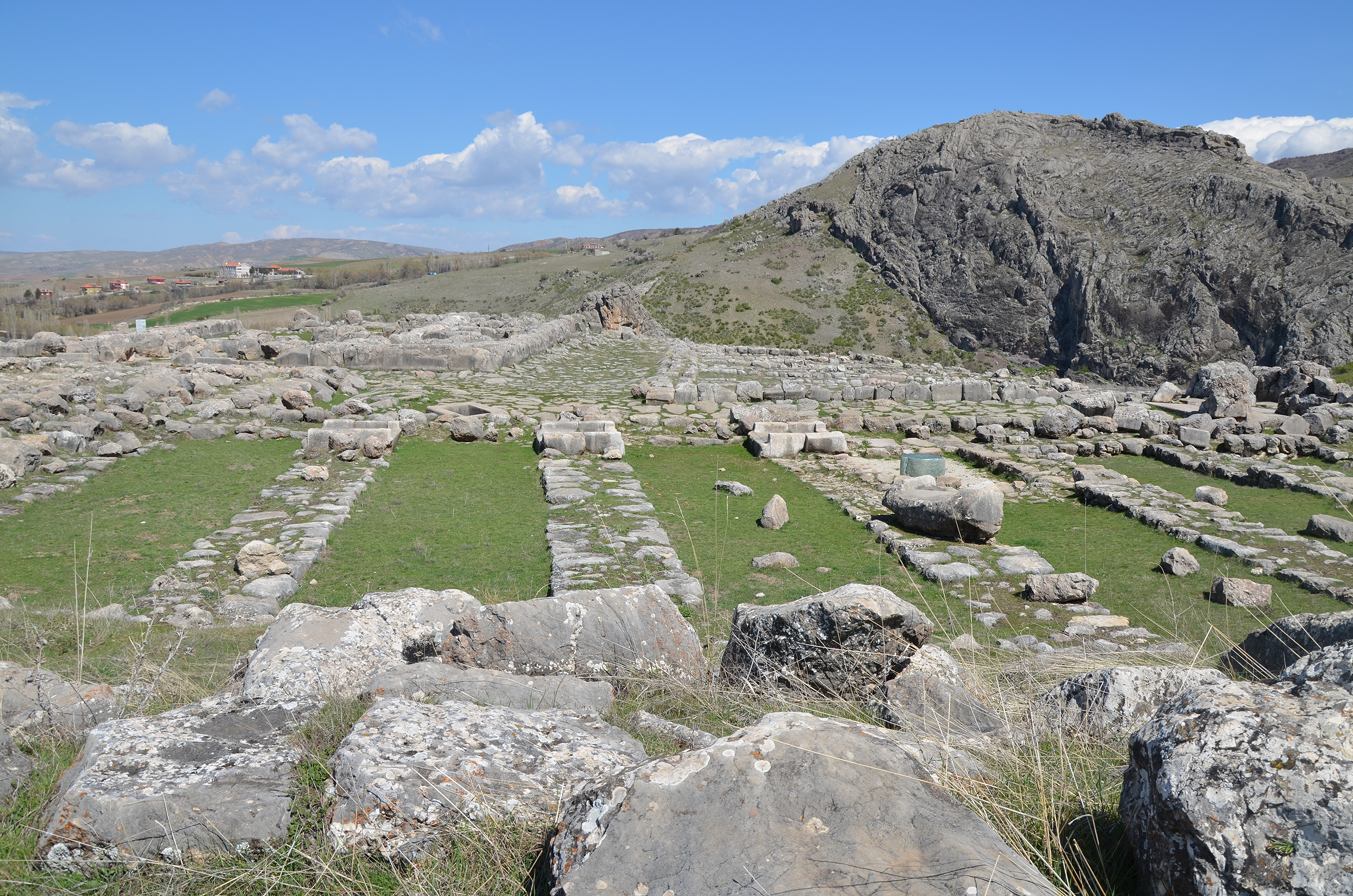
The Great Temple in the inner city

To the south lay an outer city of about 1 km^{2} (250 acres), with elaborate gateways decorated with reliefs showing warriors, lions, and sphinxes. Four temples were located here, each set around a porticoed courtyard, together with secular buildings and residential structures. Outside the walls are cemeteries, most of which contain cremation burials. Modern estimates put the population of the city around 10,000; in the early period, the inner city housed a third of that number. The dwelling houses that were built with timber and mud bricks have vanished from the site, leaving only the stone-built walls of temples and palaces.

The city was destroyed, together with the Hittite state itself, around 1200 BC, as part of the Late Bronze Age collapse. Excavations suggest that Hattusa was gradually abandoned over a period of several decades as the Hittite empire disintegrated. It has been suggested that a regional drought occurred at that time. Signs of final destruction by fire have been noted, but this destruction probably occurred after the city had already been abandoned by the Hittite royal family, elites, and state apparatus. Agricultural communities with a material culture distinct from the Hittites settled in the remains of Hattusa as early as the 12th Century BC.

== Archaeology ==
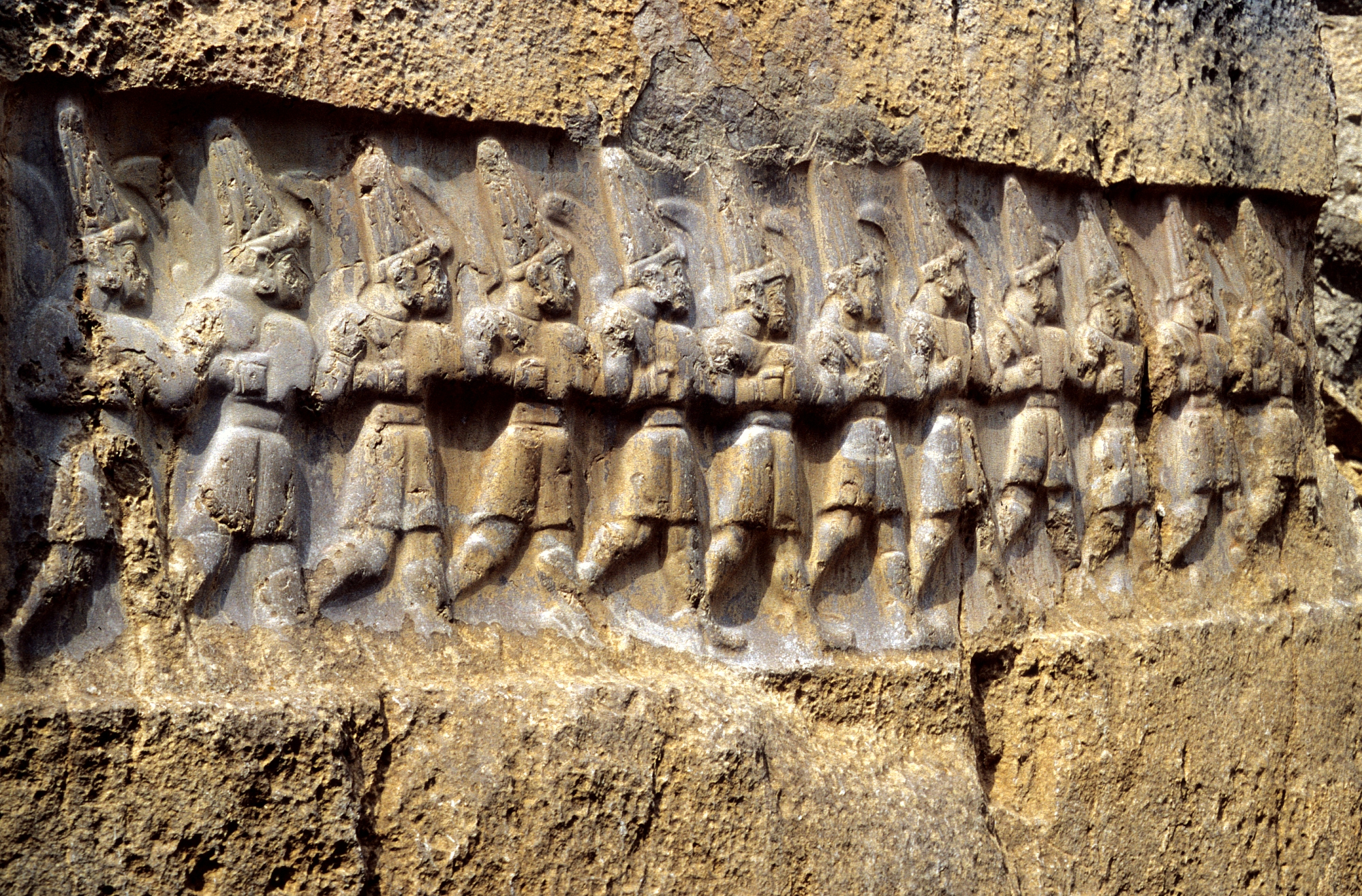
Twelve Hittite gods of the Underworld in the nearby Yazılıkaya, a sanctuary of Hattusa

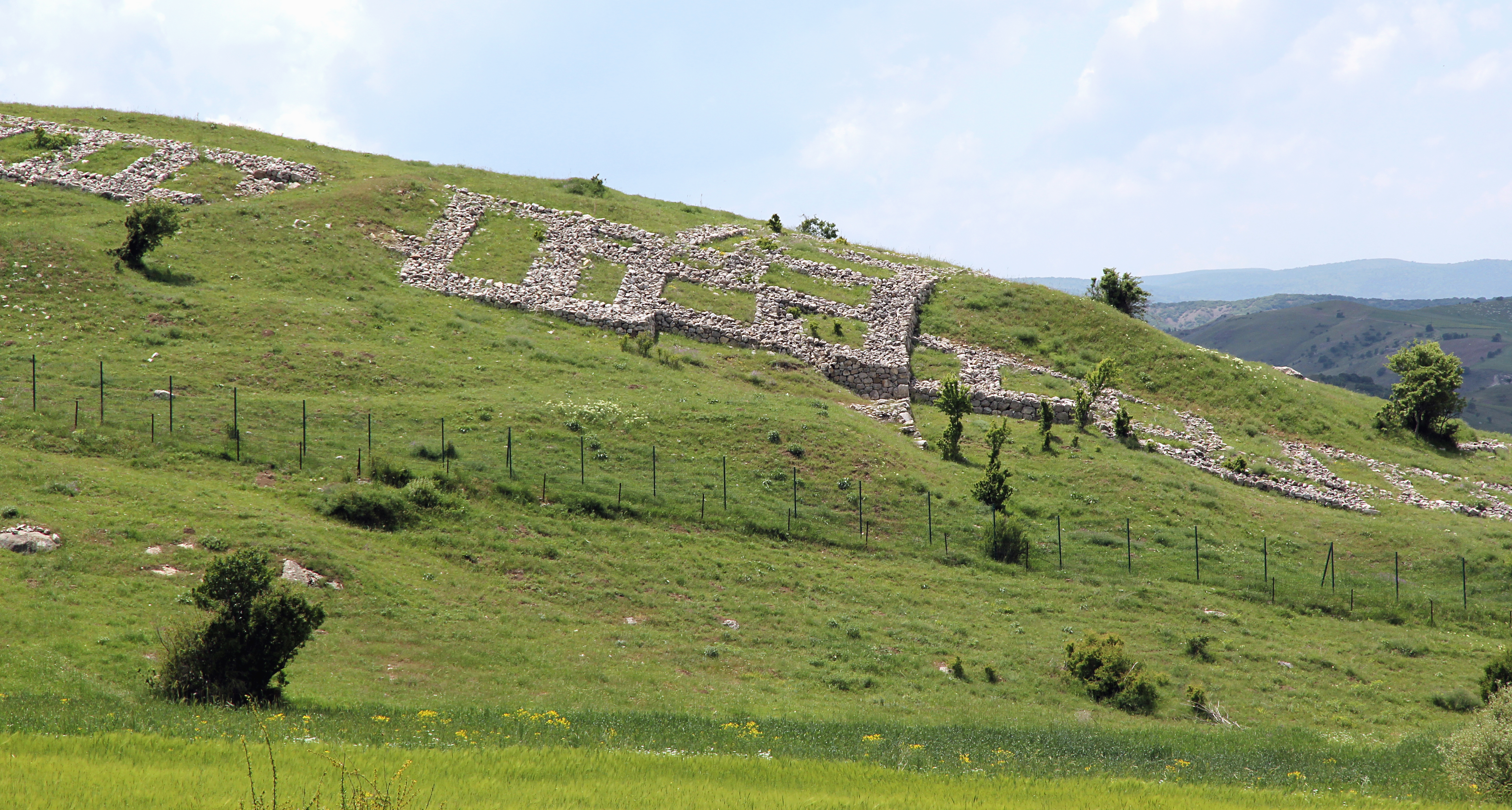
Büyükkaya site in Hattusa

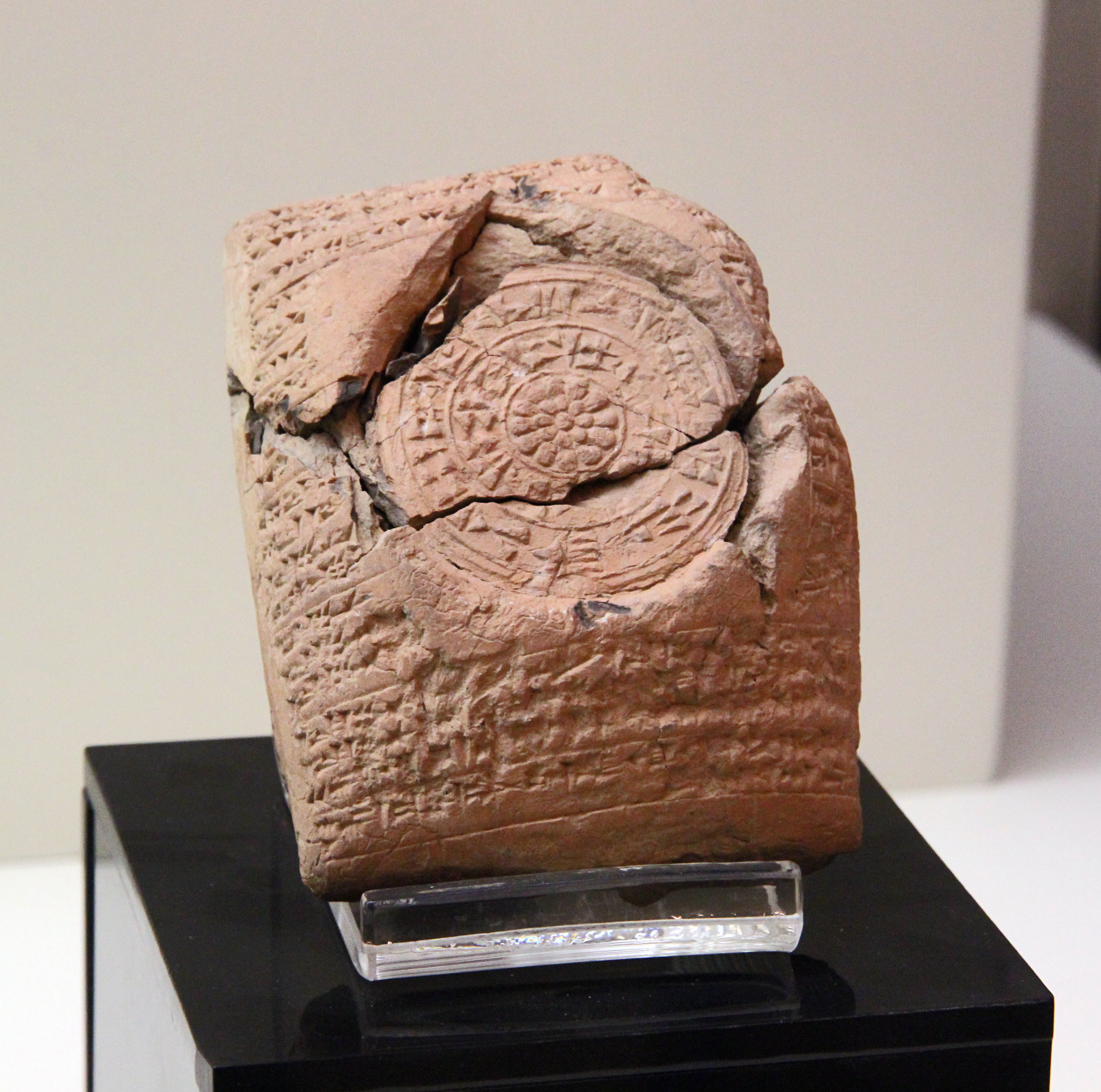
An artifact from the site of Hattusa is presented at Hattusa Museum

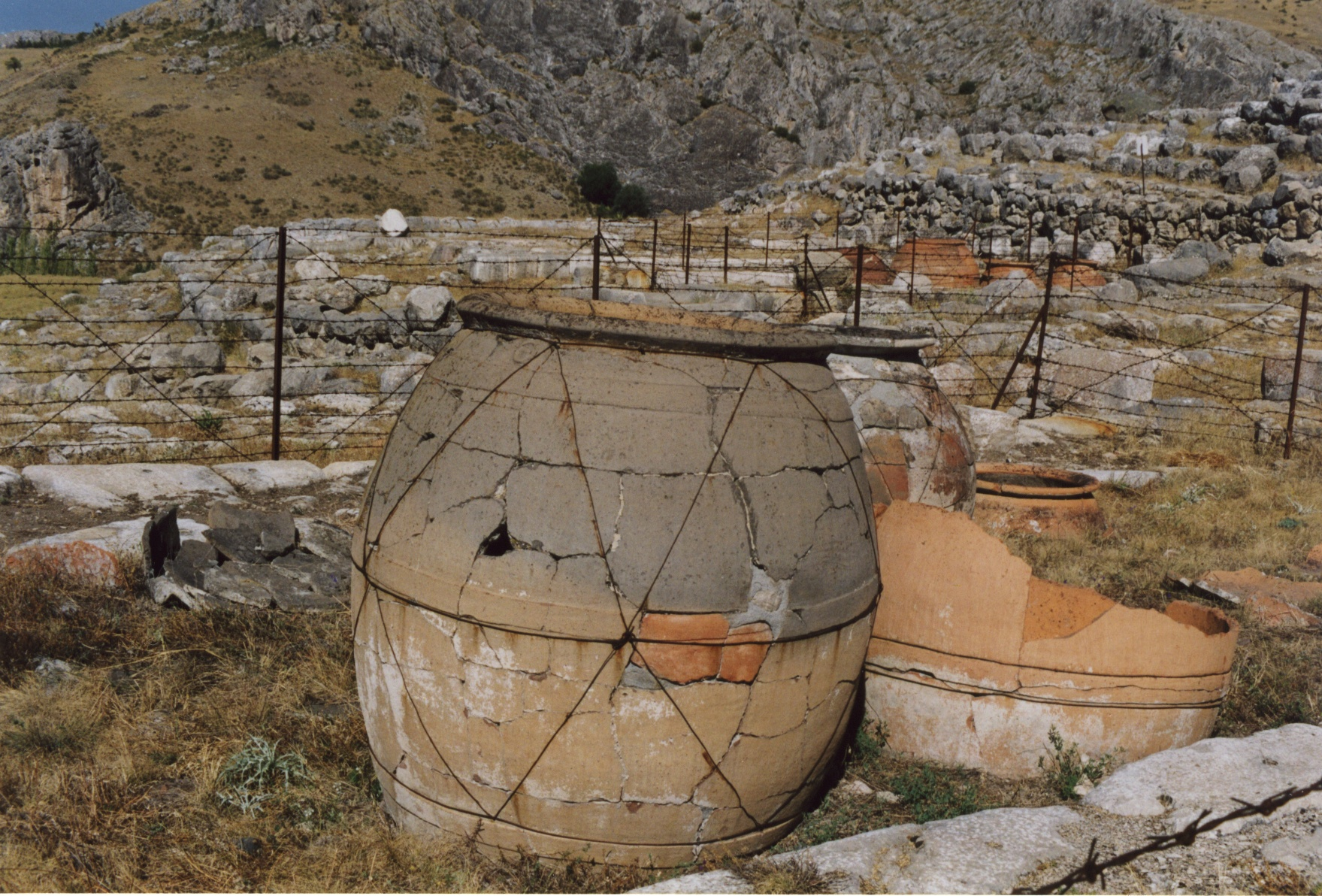
Large pottery at the excavation site.

In 1833, the French archaeologist Félix Marie Charles Texier (1802–1871) was sent on an exploratory mission to Turkey, where in 1834 he discovered monumental ruins near the town of Boğazköy. Texier made topographical measurements, produced illustrations, and composed a preliminary site plan. The site was subsequently visited by a number of European travelers and explorers, most notably the German geographer Heinrich Barth in 1858. Georges Perrot excavated at the site in 1861 and at the nearby site of Yazılıkaya. Perrot was the first to suggest, in 1886, that Boğazköy was the Hittite capital of Hattusa. In 1882 German engineer Carl Humann completed a full plan of the site.

Ernest Chantre opened some trial trenches at the village then called Boğazköy, in 1893–94, with excavations being cut short by a cholera outbreak. Significantly Chantre discovered some fragments of clay tablets inscribed with cuneiform. The fragments contain text in both the Akkadian language and what later was determined to be the Hittite language. Between 1901 and 1905 Waldemar Belck visited the site several times, finding a number of tablets.

In 1905 Hugo Winckler conducted some soundings at Boğazköy on behalf of the German Oriental Society (DOG), finding 35 more cuneiform tablet fragments at the site of the royal fortress, Büyükkale. Winckler began actual excavations in 1906, focusing mainly on the royal fortress area. Thousands of tablets were recovered, most in the then unreadable Hittite language. The few Akkadian texts firmly identified the site as Hattusa. Winckler returned in 1907 (with Otto Puchstein, Heinrich Kohl, Ludwig Curtius and Daniel Krencker), and briefly in 1911 and 1912 (with Theodore Makridi). Work stopped with the outbreak of WWI. Tablets from these excavations were published in two series Keilschrifttexte aus Boghazkoi (KB0) and Keilschrift urkunden aus Boghazköi (KUB). Work resumed in 1931 under prehistorian Kurt Bittel with establishing stratigraphy as the major focus. The work was under the auspices of the DOG and German Archaeological Institute (Deutsches Archäologisches Institut) and lasted 9 seasons until being suspended due to the outbreak of WWII in 1939.

Excavation resumed in 1952 under Bittel with Peter Neve replacing as field director in 1963 and as director in 1978, continuing until 1993. The focus was on the Upper City area. Publication of tablets was resumed in the KUB and KBo. In 1994 Jürgen Seeher assumed control of the excavation, leading there until 2005, with the focus on the Büyükkaya and non-monumental areas including economic and residential spaces. From 2006 on, while some archaeology continued under new director Andreas Schachner, activities have been more focused toward restoration and preparation for tourist operations.

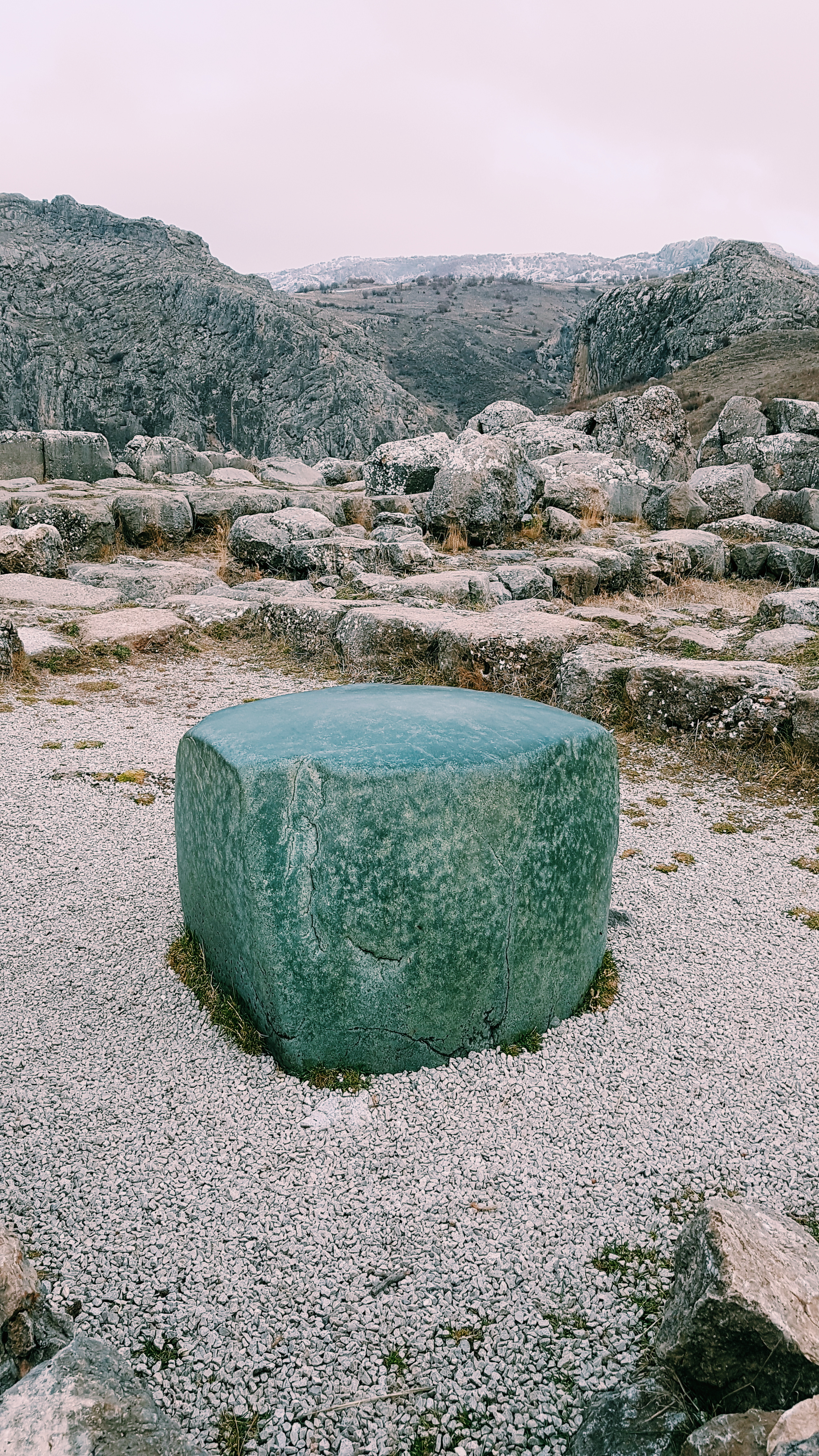
The Hattusa Green Stone, a monument believed to have religious origins

During the 1986 excavations a large (35 × 24 cm, 5 kg in weight, with 2 attached chains) inscribed metal tablet was discovered 35 meters west of the Sphinx Gate. The tablet, from the 13th century BC, contained a treaty between Hittite Tudḫaliya IV and Kurunta, King of Tarḫuntašša. It is held at the Museum of Anatolian Civilizations in Ankara. During 1991 repair work at the site a Mycenae bronze sword was found on the western slope. It was inscribed, in Akkadian, "As Duthaliya the Great King shattered the Assuwa-Country he dedicated these swords to the Storm-God, his lord". Another significant find during the 1990-91 excavation season in the "Westbau" building of the upper city, was 3400 sealed bullae and clay lumps dating from the 2nd half of the 13th century BC. They were primarily associated with land documents.

=== Cuneiform royal archives ===
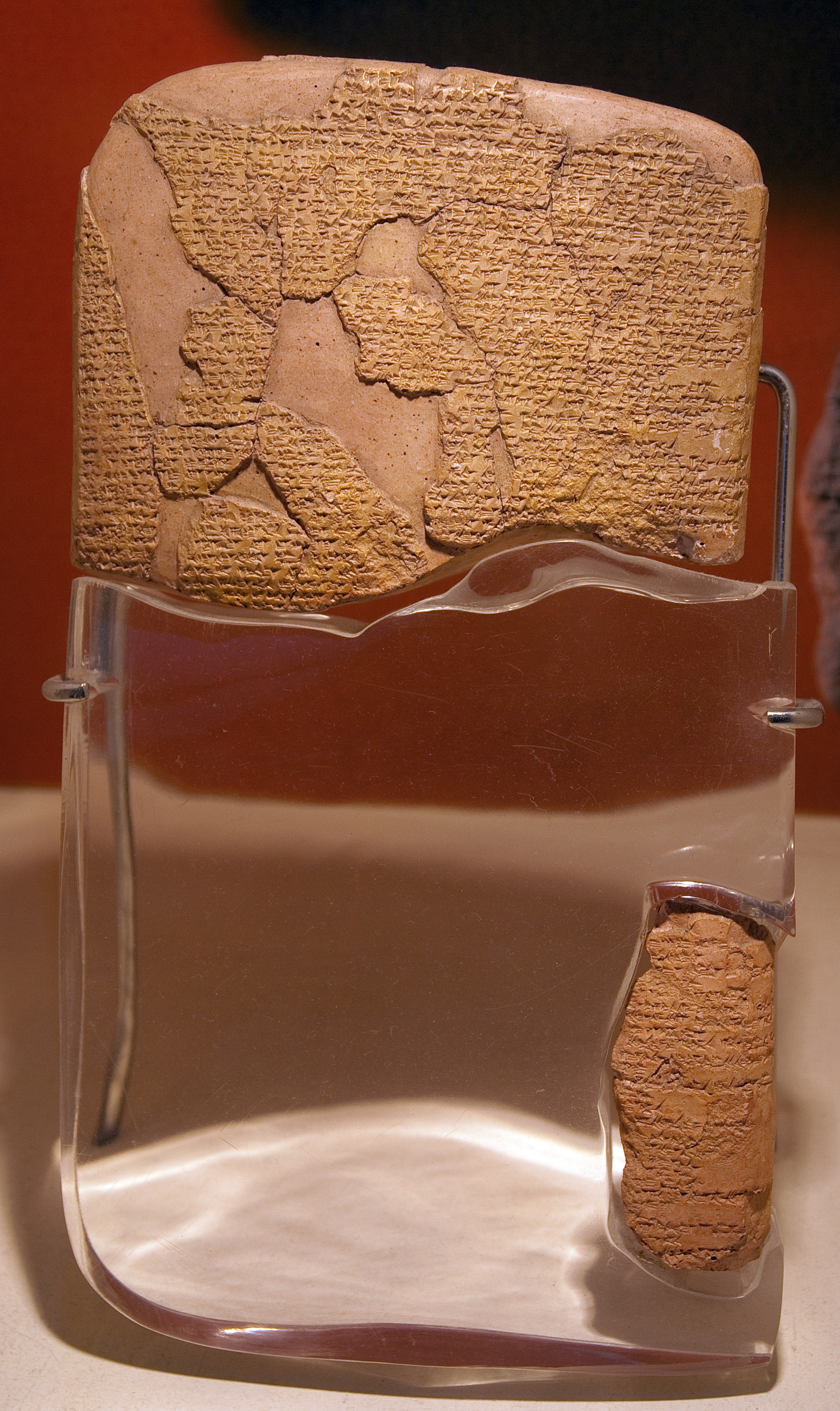
Treaty of Kadesh

Forty mercantile documents written in the Old Assyrian dialect of Akkadian were found in the early 2nd millennium BC karum. By the middle of the 2nd millennium a scribal community had grown up in Hattusa based on Syrian, Mesopotamian, and Hurrian input. This included the usual range of Akkadian and Sumerian language texts.

One of the most important discoveries at the site has been the cuneiform royal archives of clay tablets from the Hittite Empire New Kingdom period, known as the Bogazköy Archive, consisting of official correspondence and contracts, as well as legal codes, procedures for cult ceremony, oracular prophecies and literature of the ancient Near East. One particularly important tablet, currently on display at the Istanbul Archaeology Museum, details the terms of a peace settlement reached years after the Battle of Kadesh between the Hittites and the Egyptians under Ramesses II, in 1259 or 1258 BC. A copy is on display in the United Nations in New York City as an example of the earliest known international peace treaties.

Although the 30,000 or so clay tablets recovered from Hattusa form the main corpus of Hittite literature, archives have since appeared at other centers in Anatolia, such as Tabigga (Maşat Höyük) and Sapinuwa (Ortaköy).

=== Sphinxes ===
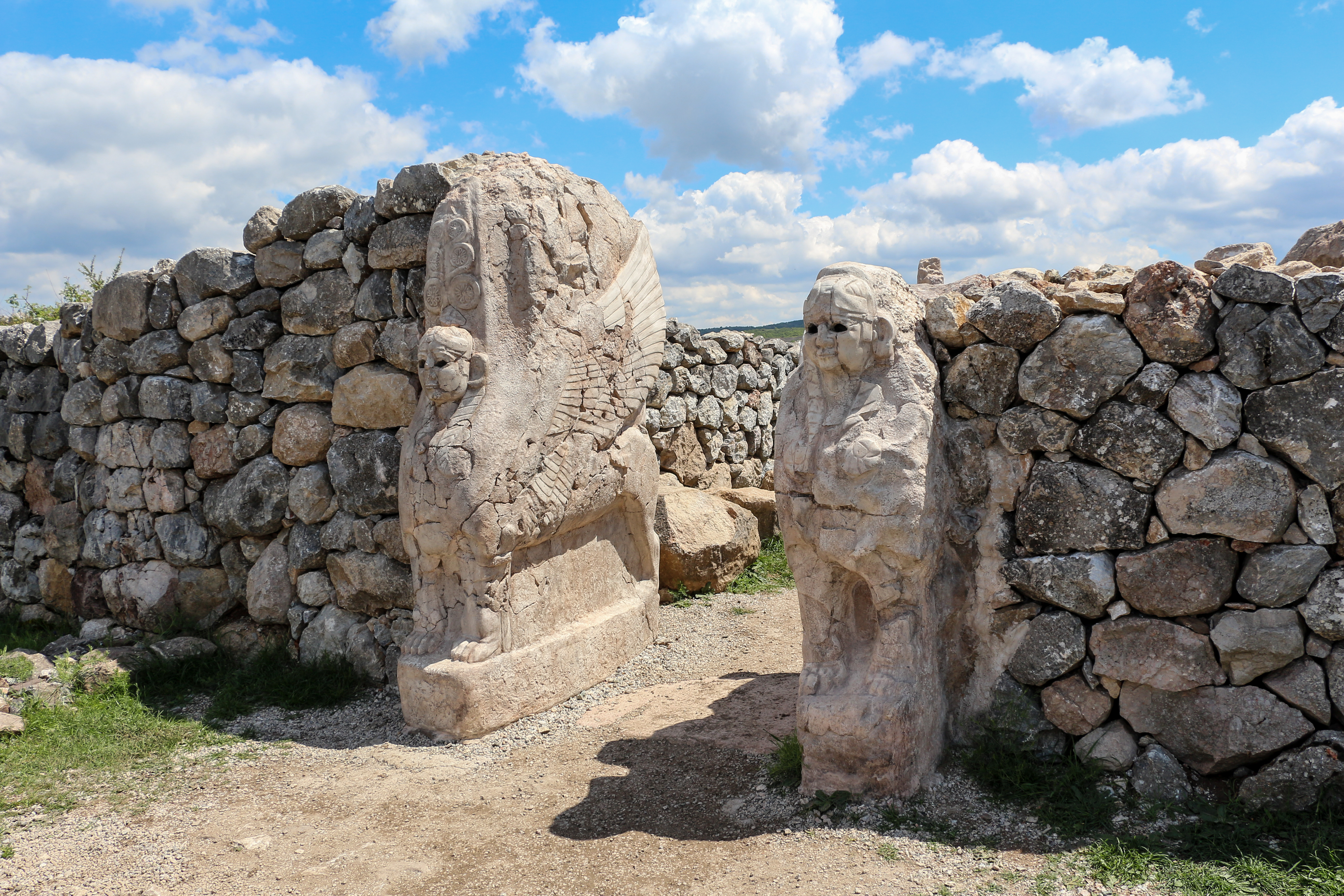
Sphinx Gate entrance of the city.

A pair of sphinxes found at the southern gate in Hattusa were taken for restoration to Germany in 1917. The better-preserved was returned to Turkey in 1924 and placed on display in the Istanbul Archaeology Museum, but the other remained in Germany where it was on display at the Pergamon Museum from 1934 until it was moved to the Boğazköy Museum outside the Hattusa ruins in 2011, along with the Istanbul sphinx reuniting the pair near their original location.

== See also ==
- Yazılıkaya
- Arslantepe
- Ancient settlements in Turkey
- Cities of the Ancient Near East
- Short chronology timeline
