= Hattusa Green Stone =

Block of nephrite in Turkey

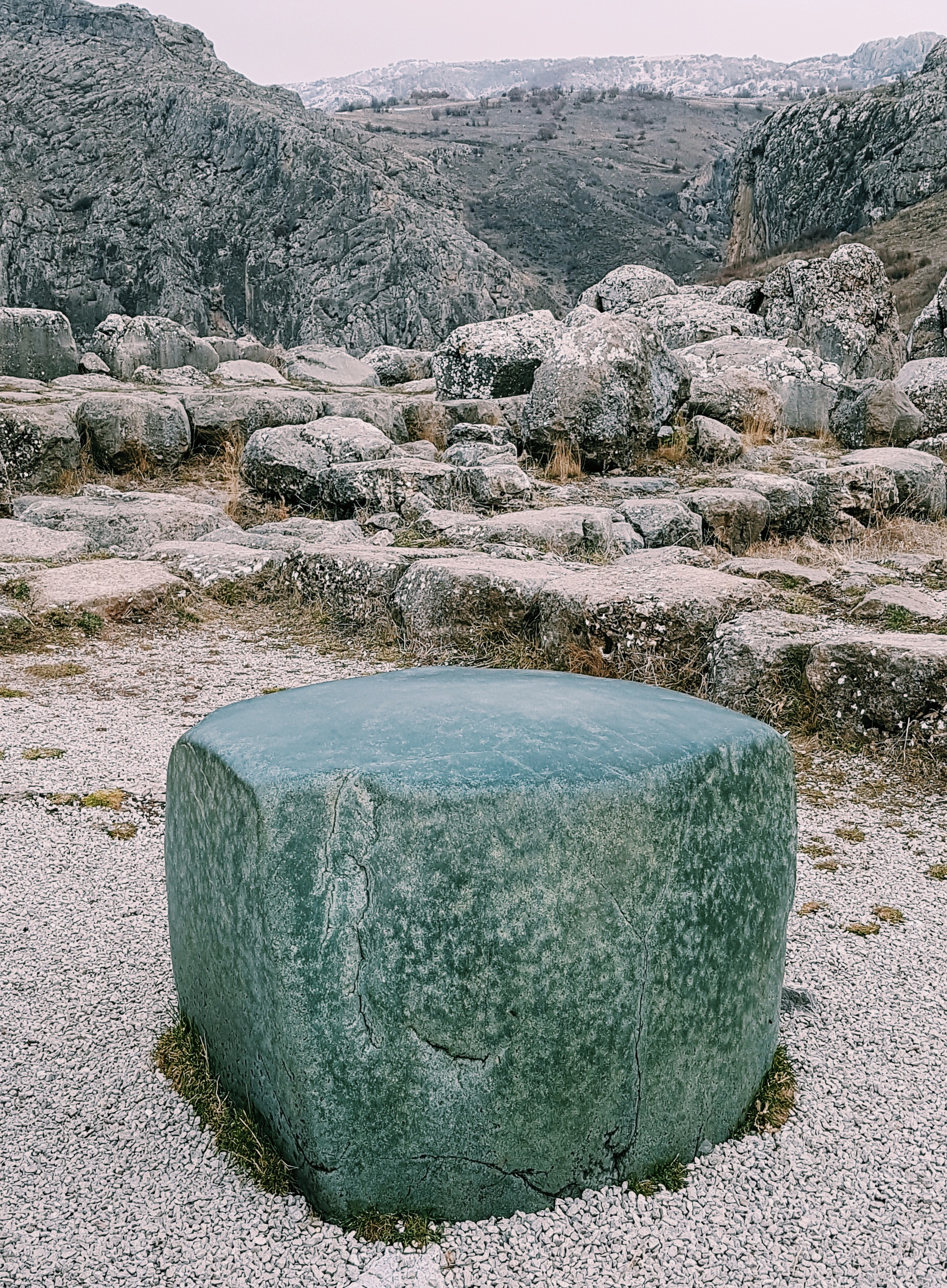
The Green Stone photographed in 2019

The Hattusa Green Stone is a roughly cubic block of what is believed to be nephrite standing in the remains of the Great Temple at Hattusa, capital of the Hittites in the late Bronze Age. Now on the hill above Boğazkale, in the Turkish Province of Çorum. Hattusa is a World Heritage Site.

The original purpose of the stone is unknown. It serves as a tourist attraction today.

== Location ==
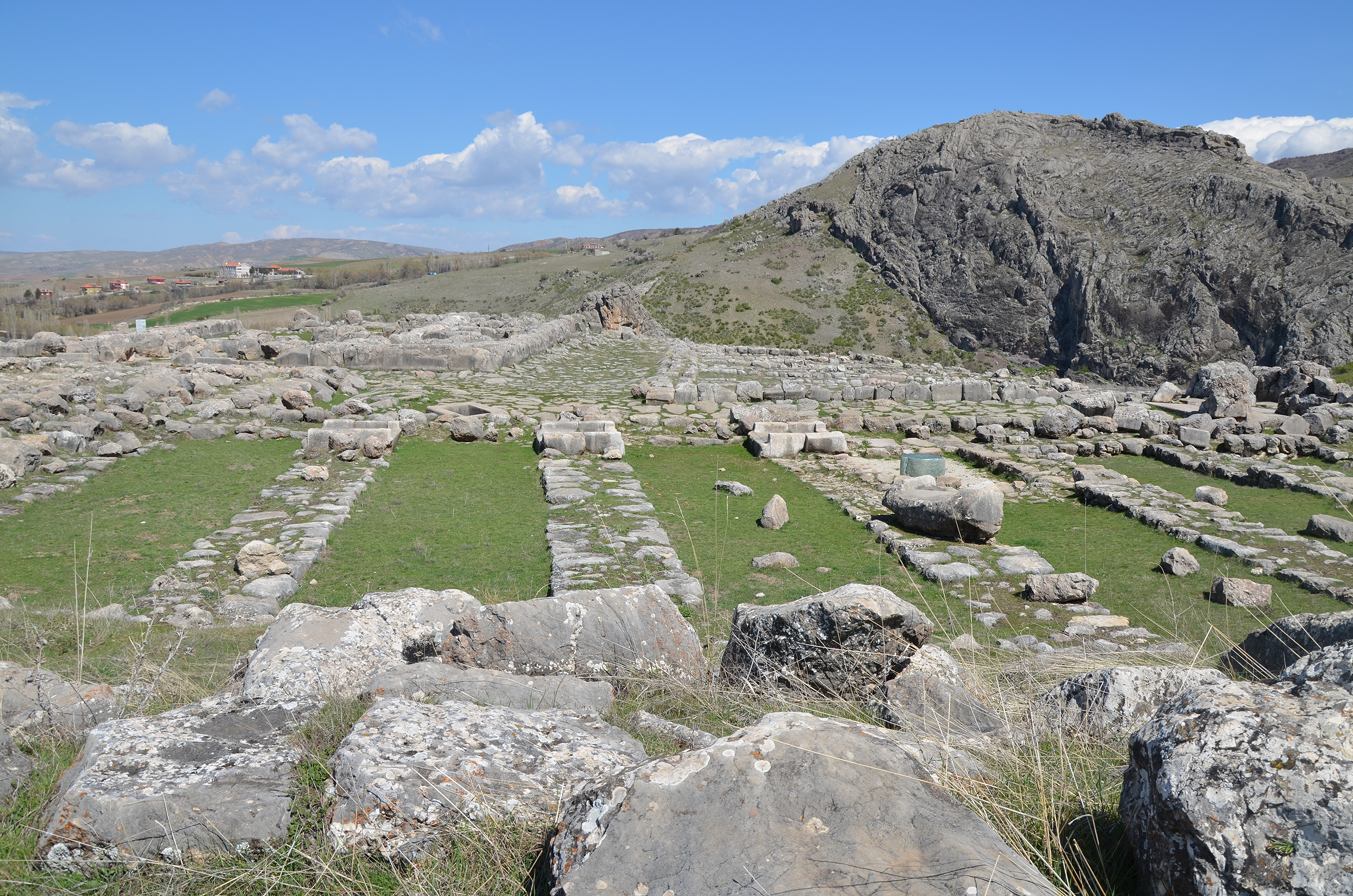
The Great Temple, with the Green Stone visible to the right

The remains of at least thirty-one temples survive at Hattusa, which itself covers 268.46 hectares (663.4 acres). One of these, called by archaeologists "the Great Temple" and "Temple 1", stands on a raised platform measuring 65 by 42 metres (213 by 138 ft). This is believed to have been for the worship of the Sun-goddess and the Storm-god Tarḫunna, due to their importance to the Hittites and the stone bases of statues which survive. The Green Stone was found in a small room of the temple at the southern end of the street leading from the gateway. It remains there, open to the weather. By comparison with the door sills, the stone now sits below ground level, suggesting that this was not its original position.

== Description and purpose ==
A block of nephrite, a dark green mineral form of jade which is common in the region, dressed into the form of a cube, about 69 centimetres (27 in) per side and weighing about 1,000 kilograms (2,200 lb), the Green Stone is supposed to have had some religious use or purpose, but what it may have been is unknown. The suggestion has been made that it may have been merely the base of a statue. However, the stone is the only one of its kind found at Hattusa.

Professor Andreas Schachner, director of archaeology at the site, commented in 2019 that he believed the stone had been used by the Hittites and all the civilizations which came after them, but why it was brought to the temple and what it was used for there remained to be discovered.

The local inhabitants call the stone a "wish stone". Its magical reputation and the mystery of its origins draw many tourists from Turkey and other countries to visit it every day.

== Gallery ==
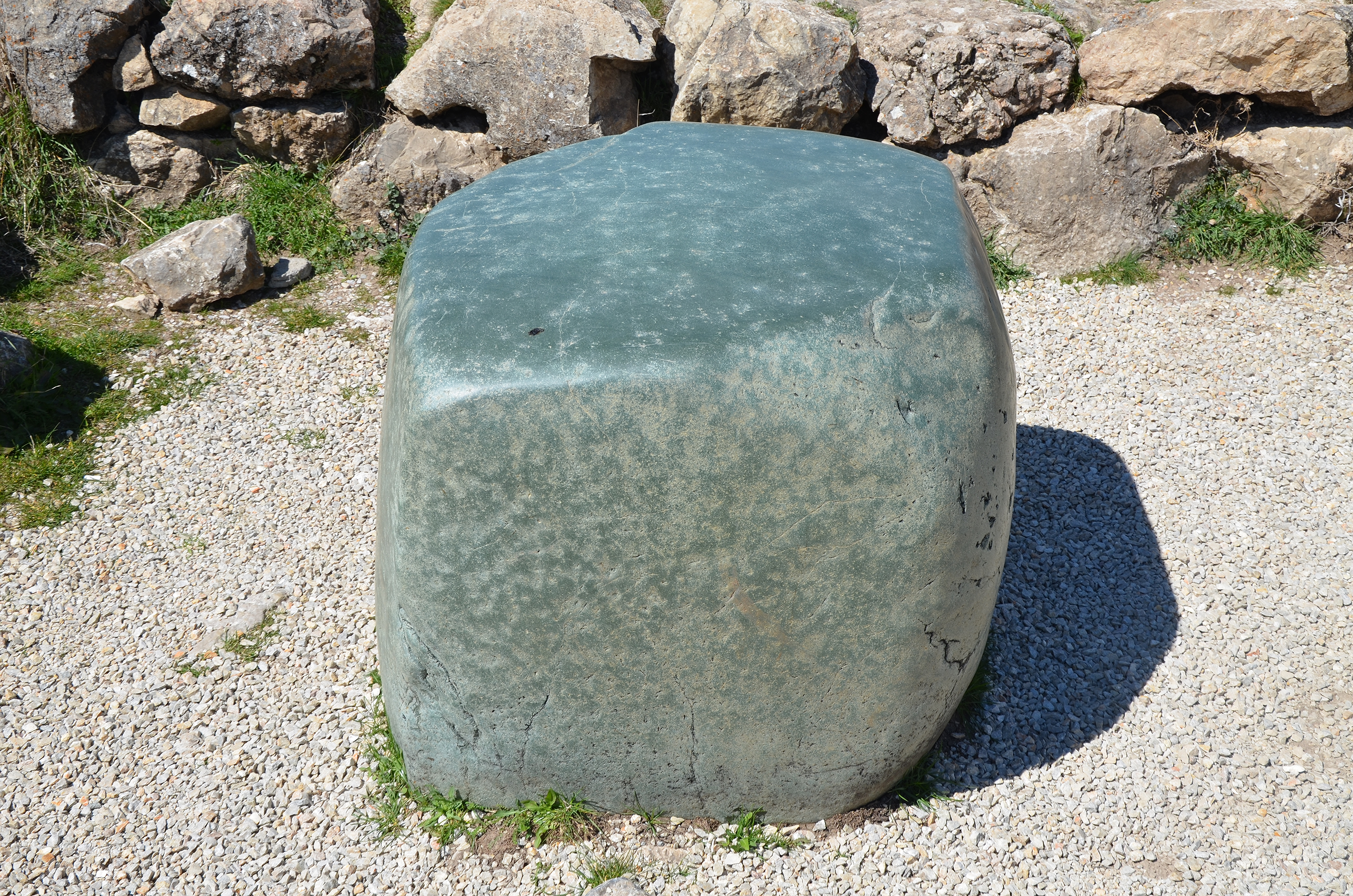
A view of the stone in 2016

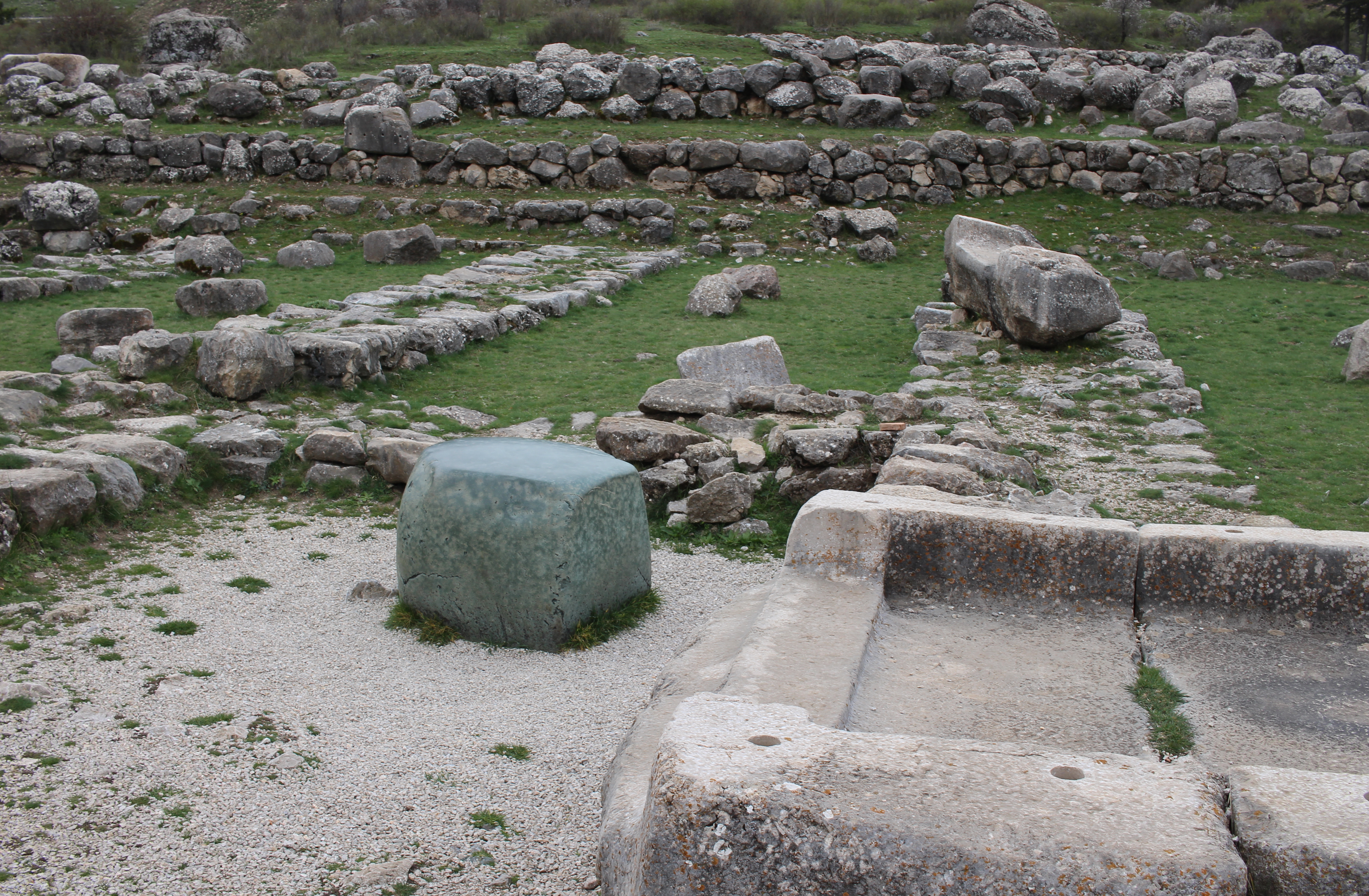
The stone in context in 2018

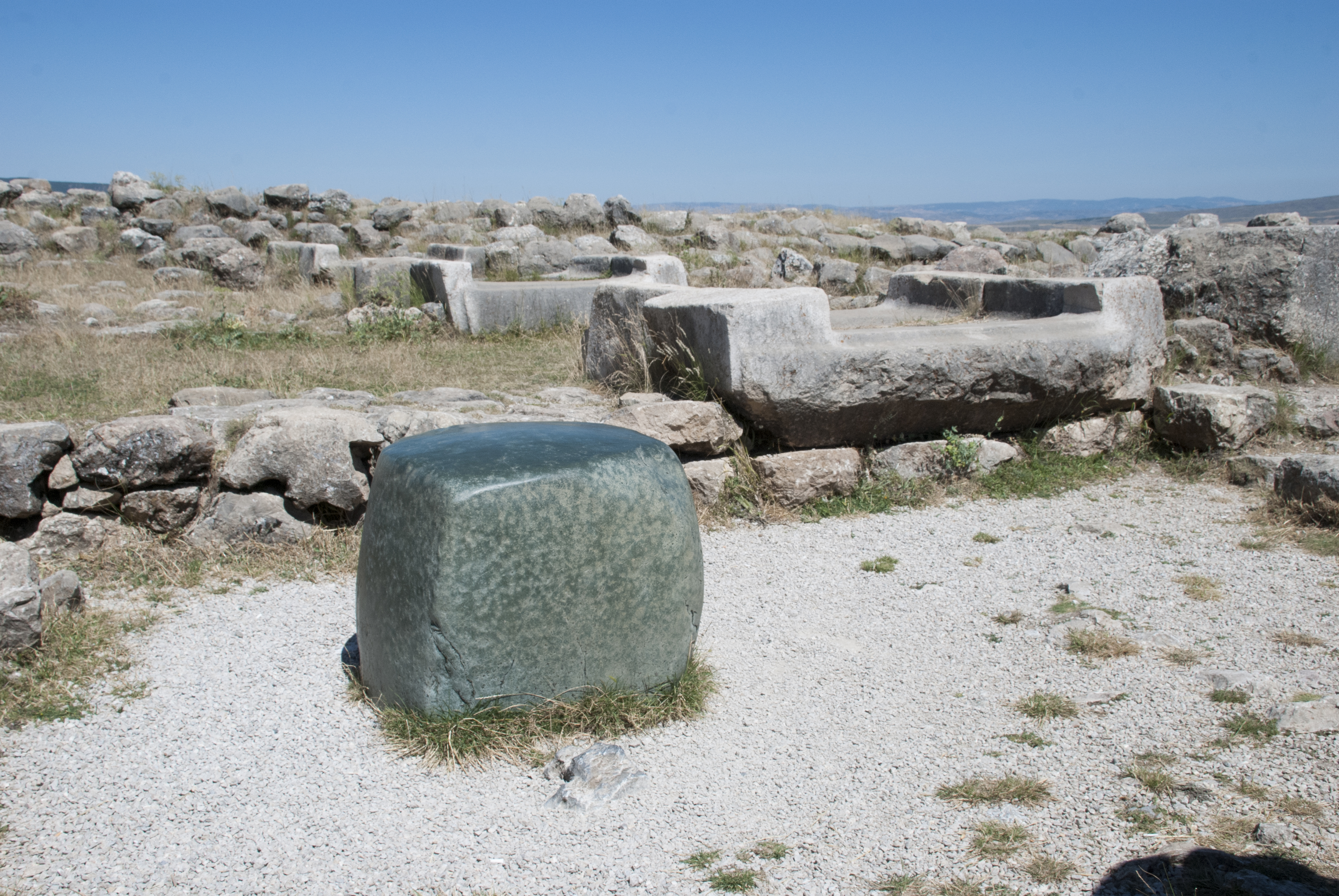
From another angle
