= Charles Texier =

French historian, architect and archaeologist

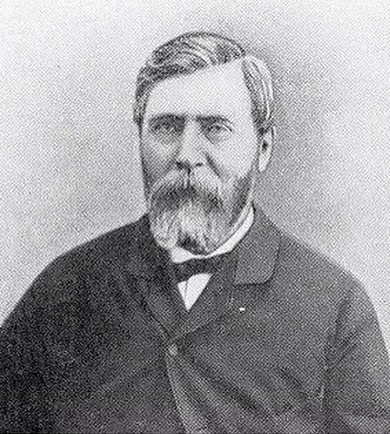
Charles Texier (date unknown)

Félix Marie Charles Texier (22 August 1802, Versailles – 1 July 1871, Paris) was a French historian, architect and archaeologist. Texier published a number of significant works involving personal travels throughout Asia Minor and the Middle East. These books included descriptions and maps of ancient sites, reports of regional geography and geology, descriptions of art works and architecture, et al.

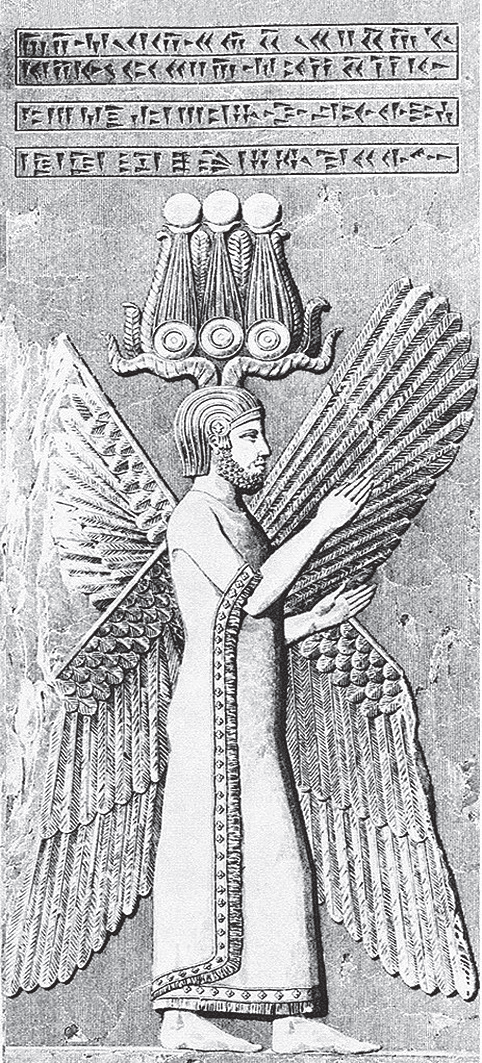
Painting from Charles Texier for Cyrus The Great, Paris, 1852

Trained as an architect at the École des Beaux-Arts in Paris, he was appointed inspector of public works in 1827. He conducted excavations of the port cities of Fréjus and Ostia. In 1833 he was sent on an exploratory mission to Asia Minor, where, in 1834, he discovered the ruins of the ancient Hittite capital of Hattusa. As a result of the expedition, he published the three-volume Description de l'Asie Mineure faite par ordre du Gouvernement français. Later in the decade he participated in an expedition that took him to Armenia, Mesopotamia and Persia.

In 1840, he became deputy professor of archaeology at the Collège de France, and in 1845 relocated to Algeria as inspector general of public buildings. In 1855, he was elected to the Académie des Inscriptions et Belles-Lettres.

== Published works ==
- Asie mineure: description géographique, historique et archéologique des provinces et des villes de la Chersonnèse d'Asie, 1862 – Asia Minor, geographical, historical and archaeological descriptions of its provinces and cities.
- Description de l'Arménie et de la Perse, de la Mésopotamie, 1842–45 – Description of Armenia, Persia and Mesopotamia.
- Mémoires sur la Ville et le port de Fréjus, 1847 – Memoirs on the city and port of Fréjus.
- Édesse et ses monuments, 1859 – Edessa and its monuments.
- L'Architecture byzantine ou recueil de monuments des premiers temps du christianisme en Orient, 1864 – Translated into English and published as Byzantine architecture : illustrated by examples of edifices erected in the East during the earliest ages of Christianity, London, (with Richard Popplewell Pullan), 1864.
- The principal ruins of Asia Minor, London, (with Richard Popplewell Pullan), 1865.
