= Waldemar Belck =

German chemist and amateur archaeologist

Waldemar Belck (25 February 1862, in Danzig – 6 September 1932, in Frankfurt am Main) was a German chemist and amateur archaeologist.

In 1884 he took part in an expedition to German South-West Africa, in which he conducted scientific studies of the region's natural resources. On the mission he also collected botanical specimens, and as a result of these efforts, he is commemorated in the plant species names of Acrotome belckii (Gürke) and Crotalaria belckii (Schinz). In 1888 he obtained his doctorate from the University of Halle with a dissertation on the passivity of iron.

From 1888 he was employed as a chemist at Siemens & Halske, and subsequently was stationed at a copper works facility at Kedabeg in the Caucasus region of Russia. While based in this part of the world, he took the opportunity to conduct archaeological research. In Armenia he investigated its ancient ruins and made copies of numerous cuneiform inscriptions. In the autumn of 1891, despite express prohibition from the Russian authorities, he unearthed 45 tombs and burial mounds, secretly shipping their contents to pathologist Rudolf Virchow in Berlin. In 1892 he returned to Germany, where he collaborated with Carl Lehmann-Haupt, a historian at the University of Berlin.

In 1898, with support from the Rudolf Virchow Stiftung, Belck and Lehmann-Haupt embarked on an 18-month journey that took them to the Caucasus, northern Persia, Mesopotamia and Turkish Armenia. On the expedition they discovered new inscriptions associated with Assyrian kings, and performed excavation work that included an attempted dig of Toprakkale, located near Lake Van.

In 1902 Belck founded the Deutschen Gesellschaft für die wissenschaftliche Erforschung Anatoliens (German Society for the Scientific Exploration of Anatolia).

== Published works ==
- Ueber neuerlich aufgefundene Keilinschriften in russisch und türkisch Armenion, in: Zeitschrift für Ethnologie, 24 Bd (1892) pp. 122–152, (with Carl Lehmann-Haupt) – On newly discovered cuneiform inscriptions in Russian and Turkish Armenia.
- Archäologische forschungen in Armenien, 1893 – Archaeological investigations in Armenia.
- Reisebriefe von der Armenischen Expedition, 1899-1900 – Travel letters from the Armenian expedition.
- Beiträge zur alten Geographie und Geschichte Vorderasiens, 1901 – Contributions to the geography and history of southwestern Asia.
- Die Kelischin-stele und ihre chaldisch-assyrischen keilinschriften, 1904 – The Kelashin Stele and its Chaldean-Assyrian cuneiform inscriptions.
- "The discovery of the art of iron manufacture" in the Annual Report of the Smithsonian Institution. 1911. 24 Bd, p. 507-521.
