= Çadır Höyük =

Archaeological site in Turkey

- Location within Turkey
- 39°40′48″N 35°8′24″E
- Type: settlement
- Periods: Chalcolithic, Bronze Age, Iron Age, Byzantine
- Cultures: Hittite
- Location: Turkey

History
- Built: 4th Millennium BC

Site notes
- Excavation dates: 1993 to present
- Archaeologists: Ronald L. Gorny
- Condition: Ruined
- Owner: Public
- Public access: Yes

Çadır Höyük is an important ancient settlement and archaeological site in Yozgat Province, Turkey 16 kilometers south of Sorgun. It lies around 70 kilometers from the Hittite capital of Hattuša. The artificial mound contains the remains of some 6,000 years of human settlement ranging from the Middle Chalcolithic era to the Byzantine period. The mound reaches the height of 32 metres above the valley plain.

== Location ==
Çadır Höyük is located in a bend of the Kızılırmak River near Kerkenes, a sacred mountain of the Hittites. Nearby are several other important Hittite sites, such as Uşaklı Höyük. Recent excavators of Cadir Hoyuk have identified this site tentatively with the Hittite city of Zippalanda. However, newer research suggest Usakli Höyuk.

== History ==
Evidence of the first known settlement at Çadır Höyük has been radio-carbon dated to the Early Chalcolithic (5300–4500 BC); nevertheless the occupation may well be even earlier than that, and go back to Neolithic (ca. 5500 BC).

=== Late Chalcolithic ===
During the Late Chalcolithic period, at the larger centers in the area such as Alişar Hüyük and Çadır Höyük, rather large courtyards and buildings such as the "Burnt House" indicate a form of administration that organized significant construction projects. At this time the settlement developed a Lower Town and a terraced Upper Town. Towards the end occupation retreated to the Upper Town. Pottery shows that, during this period, there were contacts with southeastern Europe. Some other objects indicate that there were also contacts with the Kura–Araxes culture in the Caucasus. Some of the pre-adult burials in this period showed evidence of head shaping.

=== Bronze Age ===
Following the Late Chalcolithic occupation, evidence for the Early Bronze Age at Cadir is sparse, mostly coming in the form of handmade ceramics.

Cadir Hoyuk appears to have flourished during the Middle and Late Bronze Age (2000–1100 BC). The remains from this period represent a revival of political complexity and construction efforts. This is the time of the emergence of the Hittite state in the mid-seventeenth century BC. The period between the end of the Karum period (Old Assyrian period) and the beginning of Hittite administration is well represented at Cadir.

=== Iron Age ===
The settlement continues from the Hittite era into the Iron Age.

== Archaeology ==
The site of Çadır Höyük is about 260 meters by 200 meters (about 5 hectares in area) at its base. It rises to a height of about 32 meters above the plain. It was first worked in a salvage excavation ahead of expected inundation by the Gelingüllü Dam. Work began with a survey in 1993 and an excavation season in 1994. After it turned out that the site would not be flooded the project converted to a regular excavation which worked annually from 1998 to the present time. Work was directed by Ronald L. Gorny on behalf of the Oriental Institute of the University of Chicago.

Work included obtaining a number of radiocarbon dates, from the Chalcolithic, Early Bronze, Middle Bronze, Late Bronze, and Early Iron Ages.

== See also ==
- Yozgat Museum
- Cities of the ancient Near East
