= Ammamma =

Hittite goddess

- Goddess or class of goddesses associated with nature
- Other names: Amamma, Mamma
- Major cult center: Taḫurpa, Zalpa

Ammamma (also Amamma or Mamma) was the name of multiple Hattian and Hittite goddesses worshiped in central and northern Anatolia in the Bronze Age. The best attested Ammamma served as the tutelary goddess of Taḫurpa near Hattusa, and appears in multiple treaties between Hittite kings and foreign rulers.

== Name and character ==
Attested forms of Ammamma's name in cuneiform include ^{d}am-ma-am-ma, ^{d}am-ma-ma, ^{d}ma-am-ma and logographic ^{d}DÌM.NUN.ME. The name of the deity Kammamma is likely etymologically related and can be translated from Hattic as "high Mamma". The personal name Mamma and the cultic term ^{sal}ammama- might be related to this name too. Volkert Haas argued that Mamma is the base form and that it can be translated as "mother". However, according to Ingeborg Hoffmann a connection between this goddess and motherhood cannot be established.

According to Piotr Taracha, the theonym Ammamma and its variants might have originated as a Hattic term referring to an entire category of goddesses associated with individual locations in the proximity of Hattusa and in the north of the Hittite Empire. For instance, in a ritual dealing with the deities of Zalpa, three separate Ammmammas said to reside in the Black Sea are mentioned at once. He proposes the individual Ammammas were similar to the various goddesses designated by the epithet Kataḫḫa, "queen". Both groups according to him can be considered a class of nature deities, though ultimately their role is not clear. Volkert Haas instead described Ammamma as a "divine grandmother", and interpreted her as a deity associated with the earth comparable to Ḫannaḫanna, Ḫuḫḫa (a "divine grandfather") and the primeval deities inhabiting the underworld. He also suggested she might have had a negative demonic aspect.

== Worship ==
Ammamma was particularly closely associated with the city of Taḫurpa, according to textual sources located in the immediate proximity of Hattusa. Priestesses associated with this settlement referred to as ammama might have been involved in her cult, though they are also attested in association with rites performed in Arinna. As the tutelary goddess of Taḫurpa Ammamma appears in standardized lists of deities invoked as witnesses in Hittite treaties alongside a number of other city goddesses (Abara of Šamuḫa, Ḫantitaššu of Ḫurma, the divine "queens" of Ankuwa and Katapa, Ḫallara of Dunna, Ḫuwaššanna of Ḫubešna, Tapišuwa of Išḫupitta, Kuniyawanni of Landa and NIN.ŠEN.ŠEN of Kinza). Examples include Šuppiluliuma I's treaties with Huqqana of Hayasa, Šattiwaza of Mitanni, and Tette of Nuḫašše, between Muršili II and Duppi-Teššup of Amurru, Niqmepa of Ugarit, and Manapa-Tarhunta of the Seha River Land, between Muwatalli II and Alaksandu of Wilusa, and between Ḫattušili III and Ulmi-Teshub of Tarḫuntašša.

There is also evidence that a goddess or goddesses referred to with the name or epithet Ammamma were worshiped elsewhere across central and northern Anatolia, in cities such as Ḫanḫana, Kašḫa and Zalpa. A temple dedicated to her existed in the last of these three locations, and it is presumed the well attested priestesses referred to with the sumerogram ^{MUNUS.MEŠ}AMA.DINGIR^{LIM} (literally "mother of the deity") were involved in her cult. A poorly preserved ritual text dealing with a festival celebrated in Zalpa, KUB 59.17 + Bo 3990, might recollect a mythological narrative about the local Ammamma and her three daughters, all bearing the same name. Ammamma is also attested in a single ritual text as the head of the pantheon of an unknown city, alongside a local weather god and a group of deities of mostly Luwian origin (Tiwaz, Kamrušepa, a tutelary ^{d}LAMMA deity, Ala, Telipinu, Maliya, the earth and the Sun goddess of the Earth).
