= Soanda =

Fortified settlement of ancient Cappadocia

Coordinates: 39°17′58″N 34°31′13″E

Soanda (Ancient Greek: Σόανδα), or Soandum or Soandon (Σόανδον), was a fortified settlement of ancient Cappadocia, inhabited in Roman times. The same place seems to be alluded to by Frontinus, who calls it Suenda.

Its site is tentatively located near Uşaklı Höyük (Kuşaklı Hüyük), Asiatic Turkey.
