= Kerkenes =

Pre-Hellenistic site from the Anatolian Plateau

Coordinates: 39°45′00″N 35°03′56″E

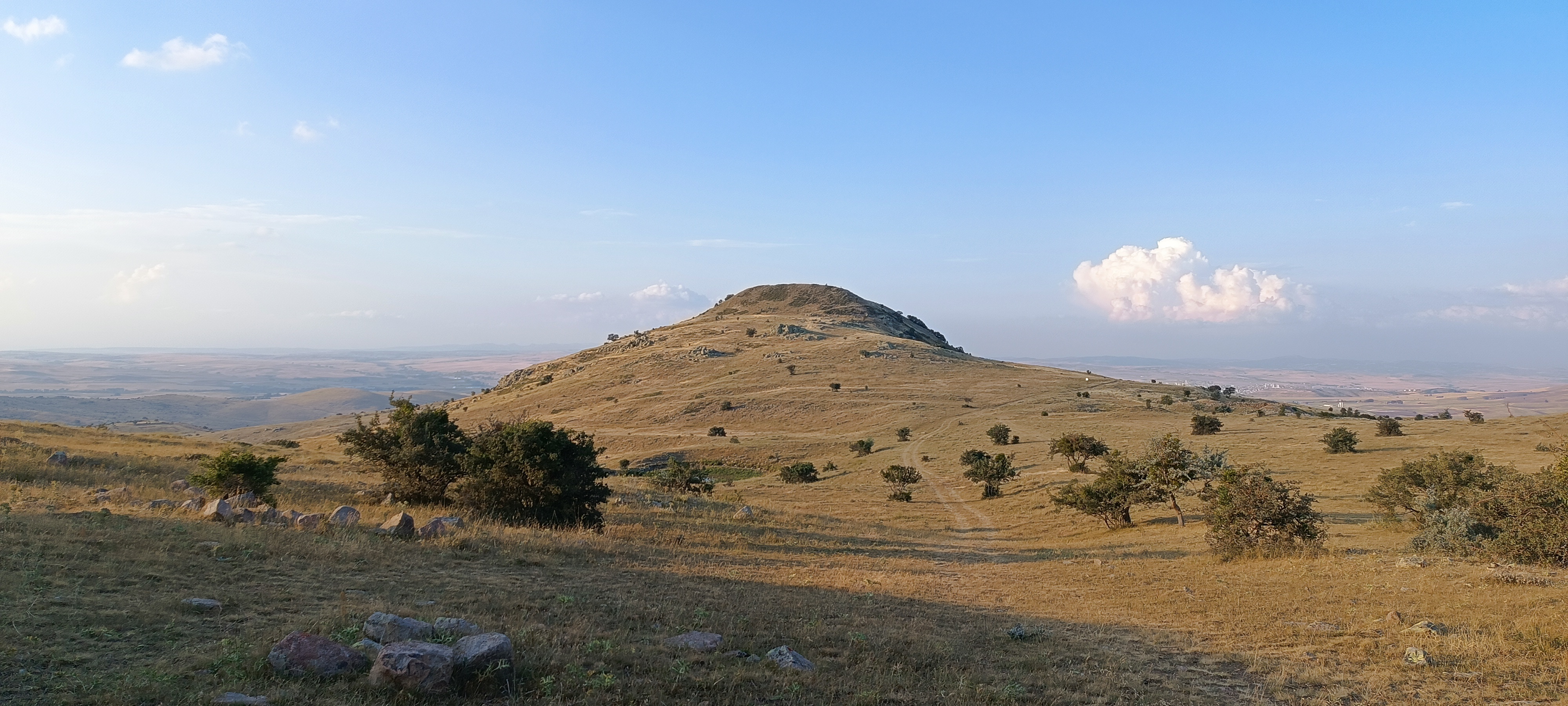
- View of the Castle at Kerkenes

- Location within Turkey
- Type: Settlement
- Periods: Iron Age, Roman Republican to High Medieval
- Location: Sorgun, Yozgat Province, Turkey

Kerkenes (or Kerkenes Dağı; both names are modern) is the largest pre-Hellenistic site from the Anatolian Plateau (Turkey) – 7 km (4 mi) of strong stone defenses, pierced by seven gates, that enclose 2.5 km^{2} (1.0 sq mi). It is located about 200 km (120 mi) east from Ankara (35.06E, 39.75N), between the towns of Yozgat (W) and Sorgun (E).

== History ==
=== Late Bronze ===
It has been suggested that this was a Hittite site in the Bronze Age, with the underlying hill being the sacred Mount Daha. An important Imperial Hittite city at Kusakli Hoyuk sits in the valley of Egrioz Su river about 8 km to the north-northwest of the city on the Kerkenes Dag. According to Gurney, the textual evidence that he assembled strongly points towards an identification of Kusakli Hoyuk with the town of Zippalanda, as mentioned in Hittite documents.The huge overlaying Iron Age construction at the site makes this very difficult to verify.

=== Iron Age ===
The Iron Age city, apparently a planned urban space, was only briefly occupied and is extremely large. This has suggested to some that the city was an imperial foundation of non-local peoples. Although its historical context remains unclear, Phrygian remains have been found. The archaeological survey shows that the city was burned, destroyed, and abandoned.

An Old-Phrygian inscription has been found at Kerkenes Daǧ. This is the Old-Phrygian inscription K-01.

=== Byzantine period ===
The site also contains a Byzantine castle.

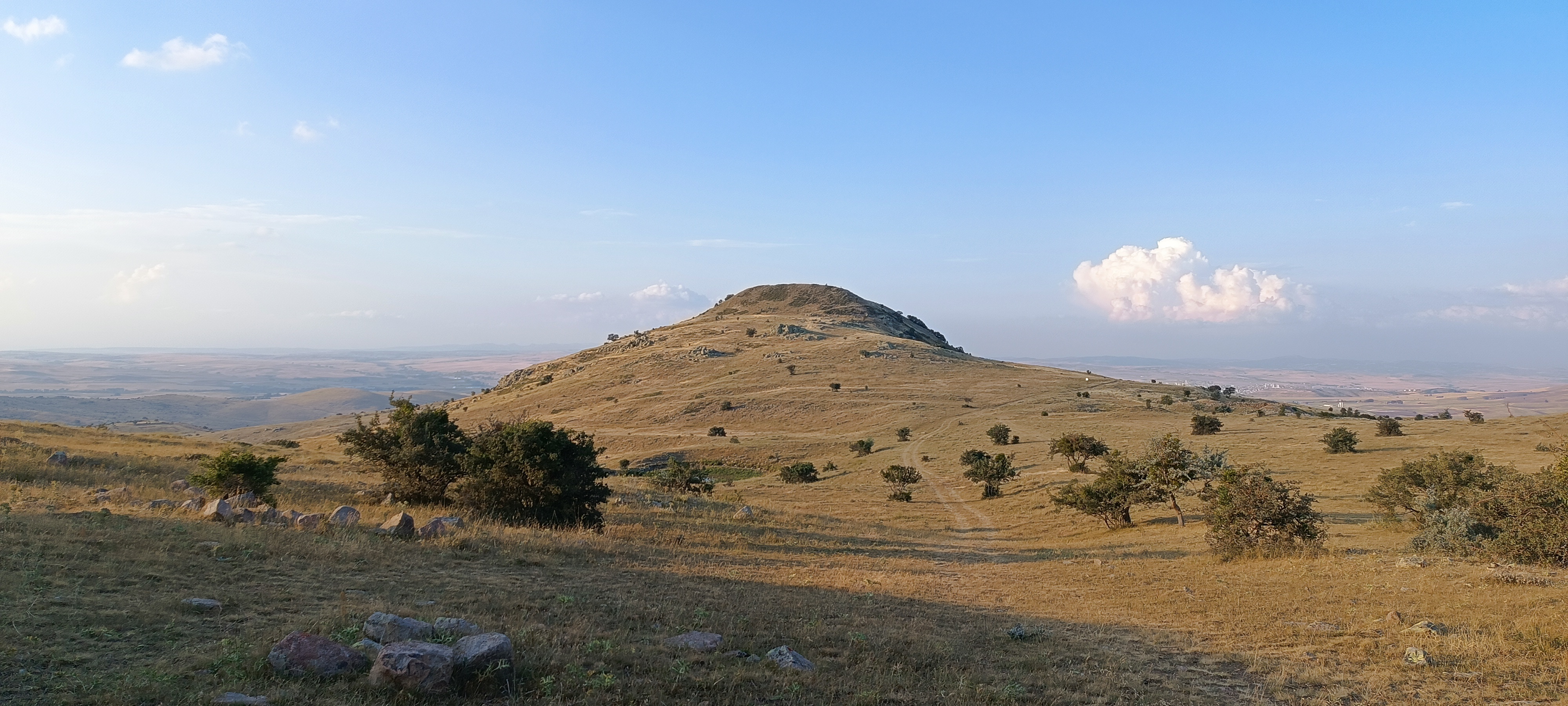
Kerkenes Castle

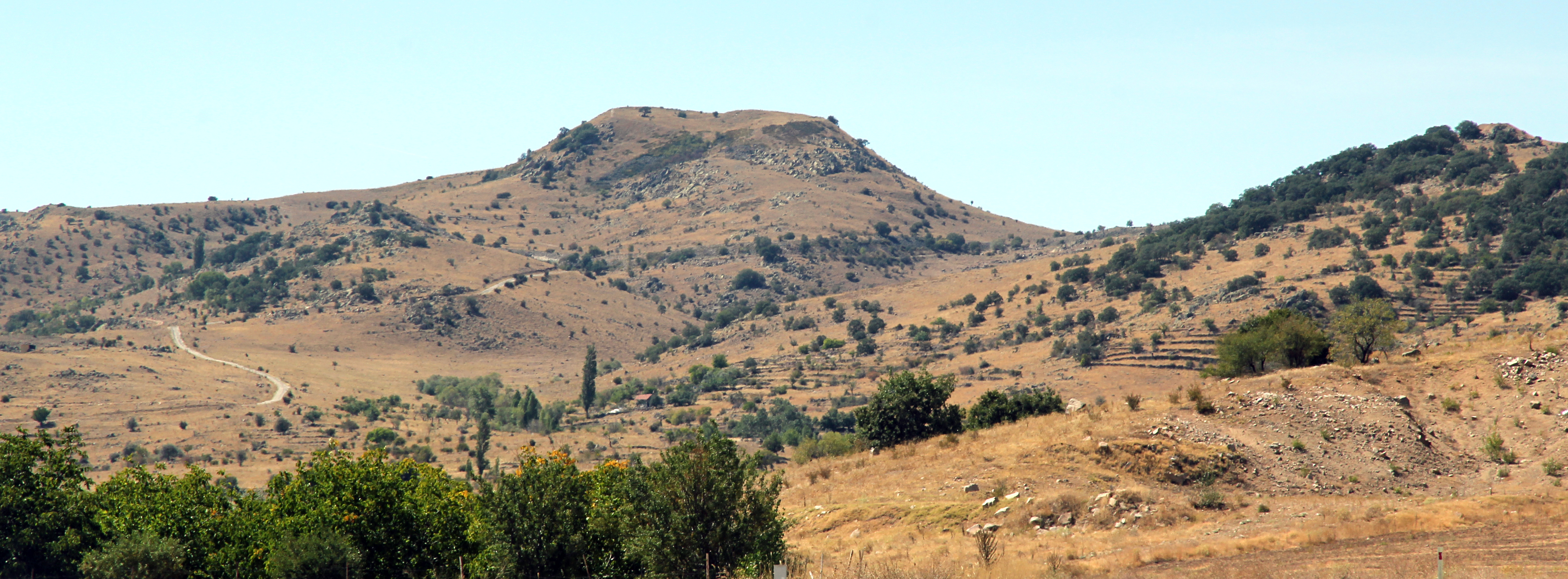
Kerkenes Castle

== Archaeology ==
The site was first examined in 1903 by J. G. C. Anderson. In 1926 and 1927 H. H. von der Osten and F. H. Blackburn conducted a preliminary survey of the site and made a map of the city defences. Also in 1926, the site was visited by Emil Forrer. In 1929 Erich Schmidt excavated at Kerkenes Dagh for around a week for the Oriental Institute of Chicago.

The international Kerkenes Project, which started in 1993 and ran until 2012, was directed by the British archaeologist Geoffrey Summers and Françoise Summers, both from Middle East Technical University (Ankara). Current fieldwork is ongoing directed by Scott Branting at the University of Central Florida.

Geoffrey Summers initially identified the site with the city of Pteria, which was described by Herodotus as belonging to the Medes. According to Herodotus, this city was captured by the Lydian king Croesus around the year 547 B.C. The Median identification has been rejected by various scholars, including Summers himself.

Nevertheless, Summers currently believes that the identification with Pteria remains correct. But rather than being a Median city, Pteria really was founded and belonged to the Phrygians. According to him, these Phrygians would have been natural allies of Media in its conflict with Lydia. For the Phrygians, Lydia was a long time opponent, which would explain the Lydian attack on Kerkenes.

Numerous cultural similarities link Kerkenes with the city of Göllüdağ.

== See also ==
- Battle of Pteria
- Alishar Hüyük
- Çadır Höyük
- Cities of the ancient Near East
- Gordium
- Hattusa
