= Kataḫḫa =

Hattian and Hittite goddess

- Name or title of various Hittite goddesses
- Major cult center: Ankuwa, Katapa

Kataḫḫa or Kataḫḫi was a name or title of multiple goddesses worshiped in ancient Anatolia by Hattians and Hittites, with the best known example being the tutelary deity of Ankuwa. It has been proposed that goddesses sharing this name were associated with nature and wildlife.

In Ankuwa, Kataḫḫa was the head of the local pantheon. Goddesses with the same name were also worshiped in Katapa and other nearby settlements. The goddesses of Ankuwa and Katapa additionally appear in diplomatic treaties. The former was also worshiped in Zippalanda, though it is not certain if she was related in any way to the main local deity, the weather god of Zippalanda.

== Name and character ==
The theonym Kataḫḫa is derived from the Hattic word katta-, "queen". Multiple writings are attested, for example Ka-taḫ-ḫa, Ka-at-taḫ-ḫa, Ka-taḫ-ga, Ḫa-tág-ga and Ḫa-taḫ-ḫa. In the oldest texts the name was spelled with an i, rather than a, as the final vowel. It could also be represented by the Sumerogram ^{d}MUNUS.LUGAL, which can be translated as "the divine queen". Multiple goddesses from central Anatolia could be referred to with the name Kataḫḫa, with the city goddess of Ankuwa being the best known.

Piotr Taracha proposes that multiple Anatolian goddesses sharing names or titles which can be translated as "queen", Hattian Kataḫḫa or Hittite Ḫaššušara, can all be understood as nature deities linked to wildlife. He also suggests that deities such as Ammamma, Tetešḫapi and Zašḫapuna had similar character.

== Worship ==
Kataḫḫa is best attested as the tutelary goddess of the city of Ankuwa. She was also the head of the local pantheon. Maciej Popko has proposed that Ankuwa was located between Hattusa and the Pontic Mountains, but this view is not universally accepted. A text from the reign of Ḫattušili III, KUB 15.1, describes a fire which took place in Ankuwa, and states that the king invoked Kataḫḫa, the "weather god of heaven" and the weather god of Zippalanda to try to stop it, promising each of these deities a silver model of the city and eight sheep as an offering if they will stop it.

In treaties, Kataḫḫa of Ankuwa appears as one of the members of a group referred to as "queen goddesses" in Hittitology, which also includes Ḫuwaššanna of Ḫupišna, Ḫantitaššu of Ḫurma, Abara of Šamuḫa, ^{d}ŠARRAT of Katapa, Ammamma of Taḫurpa, Ḫallara of Dunna, Tapišuwa of Išḫupitta, ^{d}BELTI, Kuniywanni of Landa and ^{d}NIN.PISAN.PISAN of Kinza. According to Oğuz Soysal it can be assumed the goddess of Katapa can also be identified as a local form of Kataḫḫa. This city, as well as two further cult centers of Kataḫḫa, Šalampa and Tawiniya, were located in the proximity of Ankuwa. Furthermore, the goddess bearing this name associated with Ankuwa was venerated in Zippalanda as well. The two cities shared close religiously motivated ties with each other. However, it remains uncertain what, if any, relation existed between Kataḫḫa of Ankuwa and the weather god of Zippalanda, and while it has been proposed both that they were viewed as a couple or as a mother and son, neither view found universal acceptance among Hittitologists. A sanctuary dedicated to Kataḫḫa also existed in Hattusa. Additionally, she was worshiped during a festival of Telipinu held in Ḫanḫana and Kašḫa.

A festival focused on Kataḫḫa is described in the text CTH 633. It was referred to with the term ḫaššumaš (often translated as "procreation" or "begotten"), and seemingly took place in both Hattusa and Ankuwa. The opening ceremony likely took place in the temple of Kataḫḫa in the former of the two cities. It had to be performed by the king, but a prince (DUMU.LUGAL) presided over most of the ritual activities. In an early study of the available sources, Hans Gustav Güterbock proposed that it might have served as an initiation into adulthood for a young member of the royal family, but this interpretation has been challenged by Ada Taggar-Cohen, who argues it was instead an example of state religion, and that its goal was simply to acquire the favor of a specific local deity for the ruler.
