= Uşaklı Höyük =

- Location within Turkey
- 39°48′47.2″N 35°03′09.5″E
- Type: Settlement
- Cultures: Hittite
- Location: Yozgat Province, Turkey
- Region: Anatolia

Site notes
- Area: 10 ha (25 acres)
- Condition: In ruins

Usakli Hoyuk (also known as Kusakli, Kusachakly, Uçaklı) is located at Büyüktaslik Village in the district of Sorgun, Yozgat Province, Turkey, to the north of Mount Kerkenes. It was an important Hittite city that flourished in the second millennium BC, and was identified as a possible location of the ancient city of Zippalanda, the centre of the cult of the Storm God.

== Description ==
The settlement consists of a high mound with a slightly sloping large terrace. The central mound is about 2 hectares, and the whole settlement covers an area of 10 hectares. It is located on the southern bank of Egri Öz river, in the northern part of a large, fertile plain. It is two days' walk (about 40 km) from there to the Hittite capital Hattuša.

This site should not be confused with Kuşaklı Höyük in Sivas Province, Turkey.

== History ==
The settlement started at the end of the 3rd millennium BC, and continued through the Middle to the Late Bronze Ages, which witnessed the greatest urban development of the site. There was also the Iron Age occupation continuing to the late Roman and Byzantine eras.

Recent excavations have been focused on four excavation areas. They were labelled as A, B, C and D.

=== Late Bronze Age ===
==== Hittite period ====
In Area A, remains of monumental Hittite temple dated to the Late Bronze Age (14th-12th centuries BC) were exposed.

===== Hittite palace =====
In Area D, to the south of the acropolis, a Hittite palace was discovered. This has been labelled as Building III. According to the results of geomagnetic surveys, this Building III extends 65 meters from west to east and 20 meters from north to south.

In 2019, the excavations of the palace were expanded to the west and east, and they brought to light numerous other rooms. The excavators found that all rooms appeared empty, so the building was probably abandoned and cleared out in a planned manner. The destruction by fire, the traces of which are detectable everywhere, probably occurred afterwards.

=== Iron Age ===
Area C includes the acropolis and its eastern slope. Iron Age (8th-6th centuries BC) city walls were excavated comprising a strong defence system with high ramparts erected using large stones.

=== Classical Age ===
==== Roman period ====
Three other excavation areas are in the lower area of the city. In Area B, a large Late Roman structure was found.

== Excavations ==
For many years there was some confusion about the name and the exact location of this site. The first scholar who visited Usakli in 1926 was the Hittitologist Emil Forrer, and he referred to it as "Kusachakly", based on some old maps.

In 1928, it was de:Hans Henning von der Osten who visited the site, and he referred to it as 'Küchük Köhne'. But he may have confused it with some other mound nearby.

Some other scholars also visited this location later, but the whole situation was clarified only by Geoffrey D. Summers in 1993–1994, who did a complete archaeological survey and mapping of the site. He was working within the framework of the Kerkenes Project.

Archaeological surface survey campaigns were conducted in 2008–2012, and excavations took place in 2013–2020. This work was led by a team headed by Florence University Professor Stefania Mazzoni.

Four pieces of cuneiform script and pottery were found at the site. Among them is a fragment of a Hittite tablet that was discovered at the base of the mound during the 2009 survey. It is most likely a magical ritual of the Hittite Imperial era, probably to be dated to the Middle-Hittite period.

Dendrochronology produced a floating chronology for the site. Radiocarbon dating produced a date of c. 1415 – 1363 BC for the Hittite palace, a preliminary date of a sample from a pit was c. 1008 – 905 BC and a sample from the Iron Age glacis dated to c. 763 – 486 BC.

== Oldest mosaic floor ==
Excavations undertaken at Usakli during 2018 revealed a world's oldest mosaic stone floor associated with a large building of Hittite date.

"Only what seems to be the south-eastern edge of the design is well preserved, and this appears as a frame consisting of three narrow parallel bands of stones of white, black-blue and white again; the stones of the external white band are laid with their thin edges uppermost so that they are a narrower final border."

The whole floor area of about 3 by 7 meters was believed to have been covered with the mosaic, consisting of 3147 stones of different shapes and sizes. The stones are laid flat on the tamped earth.

Since the edges of the mosaic are aligned exactly parallel to the outer walls of the entire building, it can be assumed that it was all created at the same time during the Hittite era.

Stone-covered floors are also known from the Hittite sites at Kuşaklı (Šarišša), Šapinuwa and Ḫattuša, but Uşaklı is the only known example from this period for a mosaic-like layout. Prior to this, the earliest known mosaic in Anatolia was thought to be a burnt structure in the so-called Burned Building in Phrygian Gordion.

These excavations are being carried out as a joint project of the Turkish General Directorate for Cultural Heritage and Museums, Bozok University, and Pisa University of Italy.

== Identification as Zippalanda ==
Zippalanda was a Hittite administrative and religious center known from ancient texts. It is known to be located somewhere near Mount Daha, often identified with the modern Mount Kerkenes. Uşaklı Höyük has been identified as one of the two plausible sites in this area along with Çadır Höyük.

The Weather god of Zippalanda was important among the Hittites and Luwians.

== See also ==
- Alişar Hüyük
- Çadır Höyük

== Bibliography ==
- Casucci, Giacomo, "Cooking Practices in a Central Anatolian Site between the 2nd and the 1st Millennium BC: Fires and Pots at Uşaklı Hӧyük", DUBSAR 33, pp. 57-72, 2024
- Anacleto D'Agostino, and Valentina Orsi, "The 2021 Excavation Season at Uşaklı Höyük", 42. Kazı Sonuçları Toplantısı, pp. 129-141, 2023
- Anacleto D'Agostino (2020), Tracing fire events and destructions of Late Bronze Age date: the end of the Hittite Building on the citadel of Uşaklı Höyük. in Anatolia between the 13th and the 12th century BCE (Eothen 23). Edited by S. de Martino and E. Devecchi (pp.69-93). Publisher: Logisma
- S. Mazzoni e F. Pecchioli (eds), The Uşaklı Höyük Survey Project (2008-2012). A final report. Firenze: Firenze University Press.
- A. D'Agostino, V. Orsi 2015, The Archaeological Survey: Methods and Materials. The Uşaklı Höyük Survey Project (2008-2012). A final Report, (Studia Asiana 10). Edited by S. Mazzoni e F. Pecchioli Daddi. Firenze: Firenze University Press, 35-343.
- F. Pecchioli Daddi F. 2014, The Economical and Social Structure of a Holy City: the Case of Zippalanda, in: Gs Otten, StBoT. Edited by A. Müller Karpe, E. Rieken, W. Sommerfield, pp. 153–164. Wiesbaden.
- S. Mazzoni and A. D'Agostino 2015, Researches at Uşaklı Höyük(Central Anatolian Plateau), in: The Archaeology of Anatolia: Current Work (2013-2014). Edited by S. Steadman and G. MacMahon, pp. 149–179. Cambridge: Cambridge Scholar Press.
- S. Mazzoni, A. D'Agostino, V. Orsi 2010, New researches in the Hittite heartland: the Italian archaeological survey at Uşaklı/Kuşaklı Höyük (Yozgat - Central Anatolian Plateau). Antiquity 84/325 (September 2010), project gallery.
