= Ḫuwaššanna =

Luwian and Hittite goddess

- Major cult center: Ḫupišna, Kuliwišna

Genealogy
- Parents: Ištanu (father)

Ḫuwaššanna was a goddess worshiped in Hittite religion and Luwian religion in the second millennium BCE. Her name could be written phonetically or using the logogram ^{d}GAZ.BA.BA and its variants. She was the main goddess of the city of Ḫupišna, though is also attested in association with Kuliwišna. Two types of priestesses, ḫuwaššannalli and alḫuitra, are attested exclusively in association with her. She was no longer worshiped in the first millennium BCE.

== Name and character ==
Ḫuwaššanna's name was written in cuneiform as ^{d}Ḫu-(u-)ṷa-aš-ša-an-na. Sometimes the diacritics are omitted in transcription, resulting in the spelling Huwassanna. The etymology of this theonym is uncertain. The name of the sparsely attested Mesopotamian goddess Gazbaba could be used as a logographic writing of Ḫuwaššanna's. The reading has been established based on comparison between the list of deities invoked in a treaty between Šuppiluliuma I and Ḫuqqana of Ḫayaša, in which Ḫuwaššanna's name is written phonetically, and other similar documents, where the same place is occupied by ^{d}GAZ.BA.A, ^{d}GAZ.BA.BA or ^{d}GAZ.BA.YA. While the use of the logogram is most common in international treaties, it is attested in other types of texts: descriptions of festivals, oracles and dreams, prayers and inventories. It is also used in the writing of the name of a minor tutelary deity associated with Ḫuwaššanna, ^{d}LAMMA ^{d}GAZ.BA.A.A. However, there is no indication in Hittite texts that Ḫuwaššanna was regarded as a love goddess similar to Gazbaba.

A difficult to interpret fragmentary text, KBo 24.29+ III 6'-7', uses a derivative of the term istarna-, "middle", to describe Ḫuwaššanna's character, though it is not certain what her status as a "middle spirit" entailed. Hans Gustav Güterbock proposed that Ḫuwaššanna might have functioned as an "irate deity", though there is no indication in known texts that she was believed to disappear when angered, in contrast with gods such as Telipinu.

Ḫuwaššanna's iconography is unknown.

== Associations with other deities ==
Ḫuwaššanna was considered a daughter of the male Hittite solar deity, Ištanu, who like her was one of the primary members of the pantheon of Ḫupišna. Nothing is otherwise known about her family.

The goddess Anna, originally the main deity of Kanesh, was worshiped alongside Ḫuwaššanna in Ḫupišna. In this context she appears as a member of a local group of primeval deities (ḫantezziuš DINGIR^{MEŠ}) which also included the deified sea, the river Šarmamma and the deity Zarnizza. However, Piotr Taracha notes it might be possible that a different deity with a homophonous name is meant, rather than the old goddess of Kanesh. Other deities associated with Ḫuwaššanna in the same city included Lallariya, Awatta, Kupilla, Liliya and Muli, the last of whom might have been a deified mountain. In Kuliwišna she was seemingly connected with two manifestations of Maliya and an anonymous tutelary deity instead.

In treaties, Ḫuwaššanna, always described as "Ḫuwaššanna of Ḫupišna", appears as one of the members of a group referred to as "queen goddesses" in modern publications, which also includes Ḫantitaššu of Ḫurma, Abara of Šamuḫa, Kataḫḫa of Ankuwa, ^{d}ŠARRAT of Katapa, Ammamma of Taḫurpa, Ḫallara of Dunna, Tapišuwa of Išḫupitta, ^{d}BELTI, Kuniywanni of Landa and ^{d}NIN.PISAN.PISAN of Kinza.

In the oracle KUB 6.4 Ḫuwaššanna appears alongside a deity designated by the logogram ^{d}IŠTAR and the Weather god of Nerik, while in another text of this genre, IBoT 1.33, she is mentioned in a context also involving the Weather god of Aleppo (^{d}U Ḫal-pa) and a royal palace.

== Worship ==
Ḫuwaššanna was worshiped by both Hittites and Luwians. Piotr Taracha describes her as "one of the great goddesses of the Hittite state pantheon", while according to Manfred Hutter, she was one of the main goddesses in Luwian religion, next to Maliya and Kamrušepa. She was the main goddess in the local pantheon of Ḫupišna, a city corresponding to Cybistra of classical antiquity and modern Ereğli. She was also worshiped in Kuliwišna. A festival text from the reign of Tudḫaliya IV, KBo 12.59, indicates that the river Šalmaku was associated with her.

A number of unique functionaries were involved in the cult of Ḫuwaššanna. They included two types of priestesses, ḫuwaššannalli and alḫuitra. Neither title is attested in association with other deities, and the name of the former was derived from that of the goddess they served. A healing formula of one of such specialists, a certain Bappi, is known from multiple tablets and might have been believed to cure jaundice. In addition to the priestesses, EN.SISKUR, "lord of the offering", presumed to be a high-ranking member of the local population, was also involved in rites dedicated to Ḫuwaššanna which took place in Ḫupišna. A unique ritual object is also attested in texts pertaining to the worship of Ḫuwaššanna, ziyadu, presumed to be a ladle. For unknown reasons, the unique classes of clergy are not attested in Kuliwišna.

Multiple festivals focused on Ḫuwaššanna are known, including the fruit festival (EZEN_{4}.GURUN), the winter festival (EZEN_{4} zenaš) and a celebration of installation of a new alḫuitra. Yet another festival, šaḫḫan, involved distribution of bread among the participants, after which the alḫuitra priestesses partaking in it kissed each other. It is commonly assumed that many attested celebrations of Ḫuwaššanna were performed in private. However, this conclusion is not universally accepted.

Ḫuwaššanna was no longer worshiped in the first millennium BCE.
