= Yozgat Museum =

Museum in Yozgat, Turkey

- Yozgat Müzesi
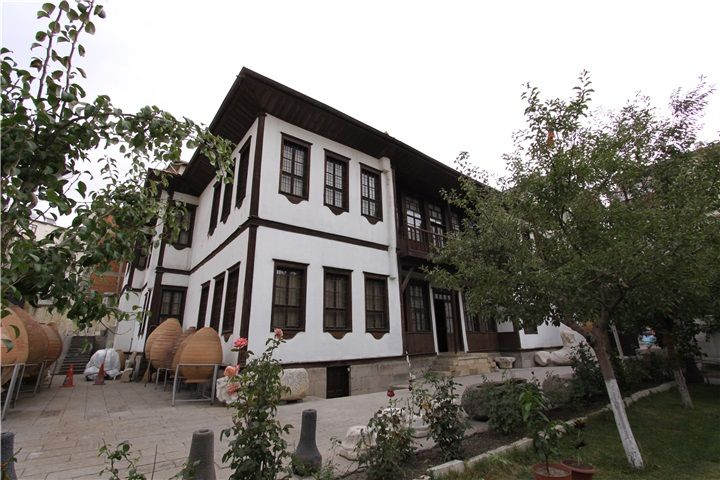
- From the museum yard

- Yozgat Museum
- Established: 1985; 41 years ago
- Coordinates: 39°49′24″N 34°48′18″E
- Type: Archaeology, Ethnography
- Collection size: 4440
- Owner: Ministry of Culture

Yozgat Museum is a museum in Yozgat, Turkey.

The museum building is an old mansion named Nizamoğlu Mansion. It was built in 1871. The mansion was purchased by the Ministry of Culture in 1979. After a restoration period it was opened as a museum in 1985.

In the museum there are both ethnographic and archaeological items. Among the ethnographic items there are hand written manuscripts, local clothing, carpets, kitchen and everyday tools, wooden artifacts and weapons. Sculptures, sarcophagi, coins, stamps and inscriptions make up the archaeological section. There are over 2800 ethnographic and 1640 archaeological items in the museum.
