= Zippalanda =

Hittite city in Anatolia

Coordinates: 39°41′28″N 35°08′29″E

Zippalanda (Uşaklı höyük) was a Hattic administrative and religious center of the Hittite Old Kingdom. Although its name was known from inscriptions, it was not until the latter 20th century that scholars placed it in Sorgun District of Yozgat Province, Turkey, near Kerkenes Dağ (Kerkenes Mountain often identified with Mount Daha (Mount Taha)), about one day's journey north of Ankuwa (present-day Alışar Höyük).

== History ==
Zippalanda was one of the ancient Hattic religious centers (šiunan URU "city of the gods") that retained privileges in the Old Kingdom. These also included Arinna and Nerik; early on, Hattusa was added to these as well. Also toward the end of the Hittite Empire, after Muwatalli II moved the Hittite capital from Hattusa to Tarhuntassa, this also became a sacred city.

The Hittite king participated in official religious ceremonies such as the purulli-festival, spring and autumn Imperial festivals, the festival of the month, and possibly the hunting festival (the Ki-Lam).

The Weather god of Zippalanda, originally Hattic, was an important deity for the Hittites. At Zippalanda, he was considered to be the son of Tarḫunna, the 'Weather god of Heaven', and the Sun goddess of the Earth (known as Allani in the Hurrian-Hittite "Song of the Ransom"). His partner was the goddess Anzili or Enzili, who played a role in the rituals of Hittite childbirth.

Much of the information about Zippalanda comes from tablets found at Hattusa, which record the existence of the temple of the Storm God and a palace or royal residence (halentu) and refer indirectly to daily religious life and festivals.

In addition to religious functions, people at Zippalanda are recorded as engaging in military affairs, crafts, hunting and stock breeding.

== Plausible sites ==
The plausible sites are the settlement mounds known as Çadır Mound (Çadır Höyük) and Uşaklı Mound (Uşaklı Höyük).

The light defenses of the city wall suggest that it was a religious perimeter like that of Alaca Höyük. A number of cultic sites are found within the city and ranging outside it toward Mount Daha.

At least one scholar, Maciej Popko, has identified Zippalanda with Alaca Höyük, but this is not a widely held view.

In January 2020, one of the earliest Mosaics in the world was found in Uşaklı Höyük, and possibly Zippalanda.

In December 2022, archaeologists from the University of Pisa found a circular-shaped structure located to the north of what is probably the main temple of the city on the mound of Uşaklı Höyük. This, together with tablets found and other previous finds, could identify Uşaklı Höyük as ancient Zippalanda.
