= Alişar Hüyük =

Archaeological site in Yozgat Province, Turkey

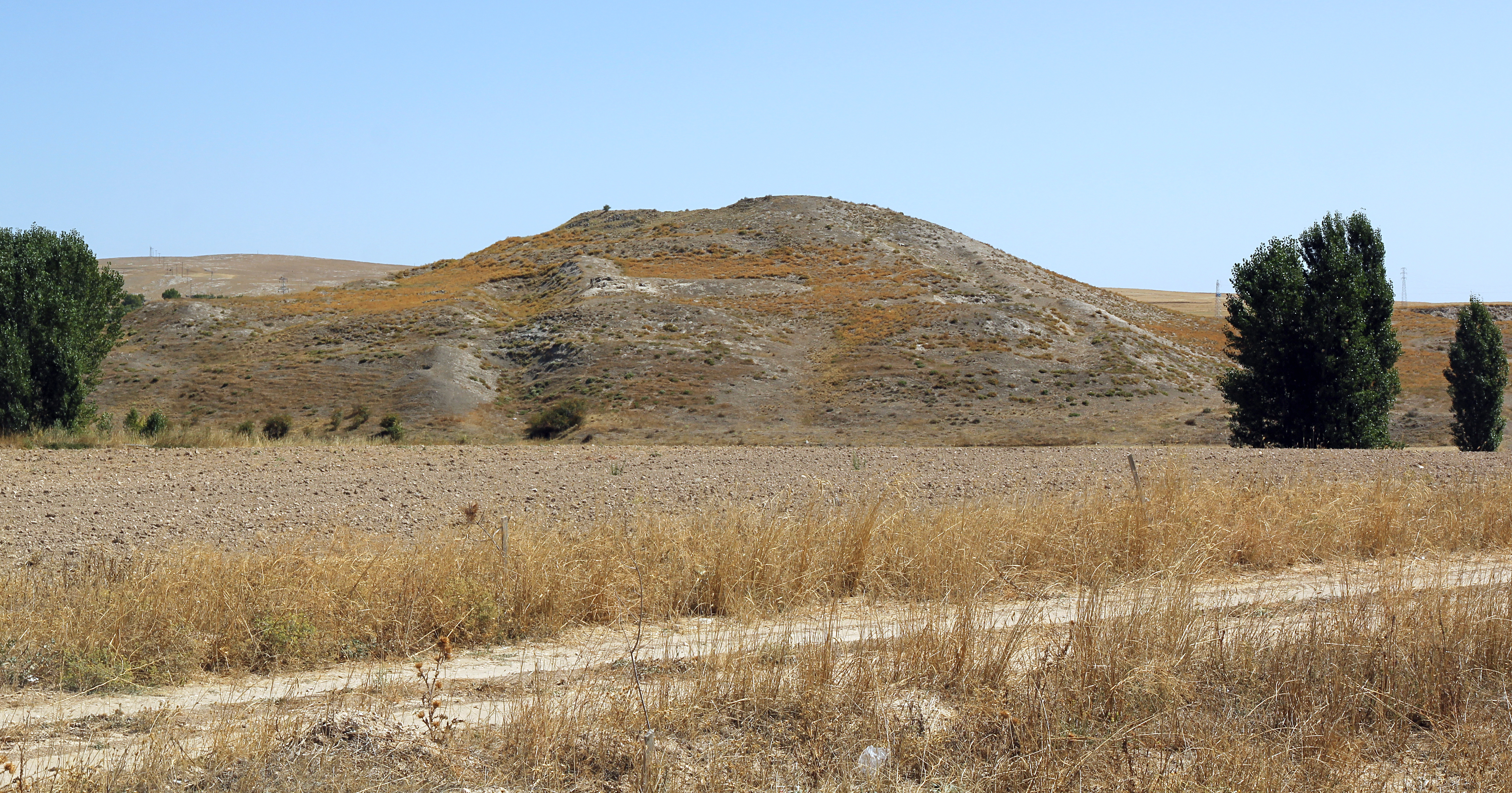
- Alişar Höyük settlement hill

- Location within Turkey
- 39°36′22″N 35°15′41″E
- Type: settlement
- Periods: Neolithic, Chalcolithic, Bronze Age
- Location: Yozgat Province, Turkey

History
- Built: 4th millennium BC

Site notes
- Excavation dates: 1927-1932, 1992-2006
- Archaeologists: Erich Schmidt, Ronald Gorny
- Condition: Ruined
- Owner: Public
- Public access: Yes

Alishar Hüyük (also Alişar Höyük) in modern Yozgat Province, Turkey was an ancient city in Central Anatolia. It is 2.5 kilometers northeast of the modern village of Alişar. It has been suggested that in the Iron Age the site was part of the polity of Tabal. Its name in the Hittite period has been proposed as Ankuwa. Ankuwa was a cult center for the Hattic goddess Kataḫḫa.

== History ==
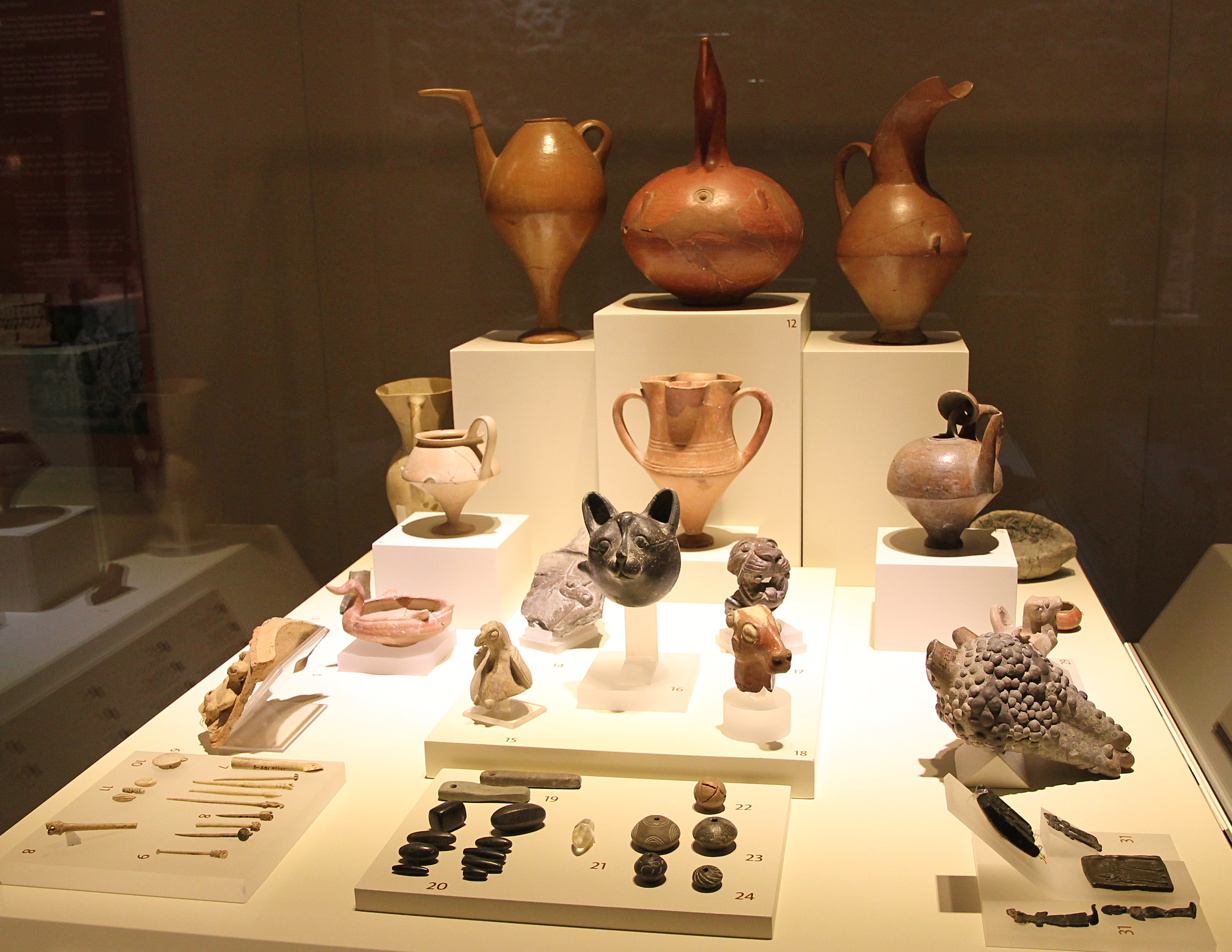
Museum of Anatolian Civilizations, Ankara, Türkiye, finds from Alişar Höyük

Alishar Hüyük was occupied beginning in the Neolithic Period, through the Chalcolithic, Bronze Age and the Hittites, and into Phrygian times. The remnants of a Late Roman or Byzantine church were also found. During the Neolithic times (found at 26 meters below the mound surface and about 11 meters above virgin soil) the site was in the middle of a lake and occupation was restricted to the mound. As the area dried in the Chalcolithic Age occupation slowly spread off the mound and outer defenses were built. Eventually in the Early Bronze Age a large defensive fortification wall, with gates, was built.

=== Middle Bronze Age ===
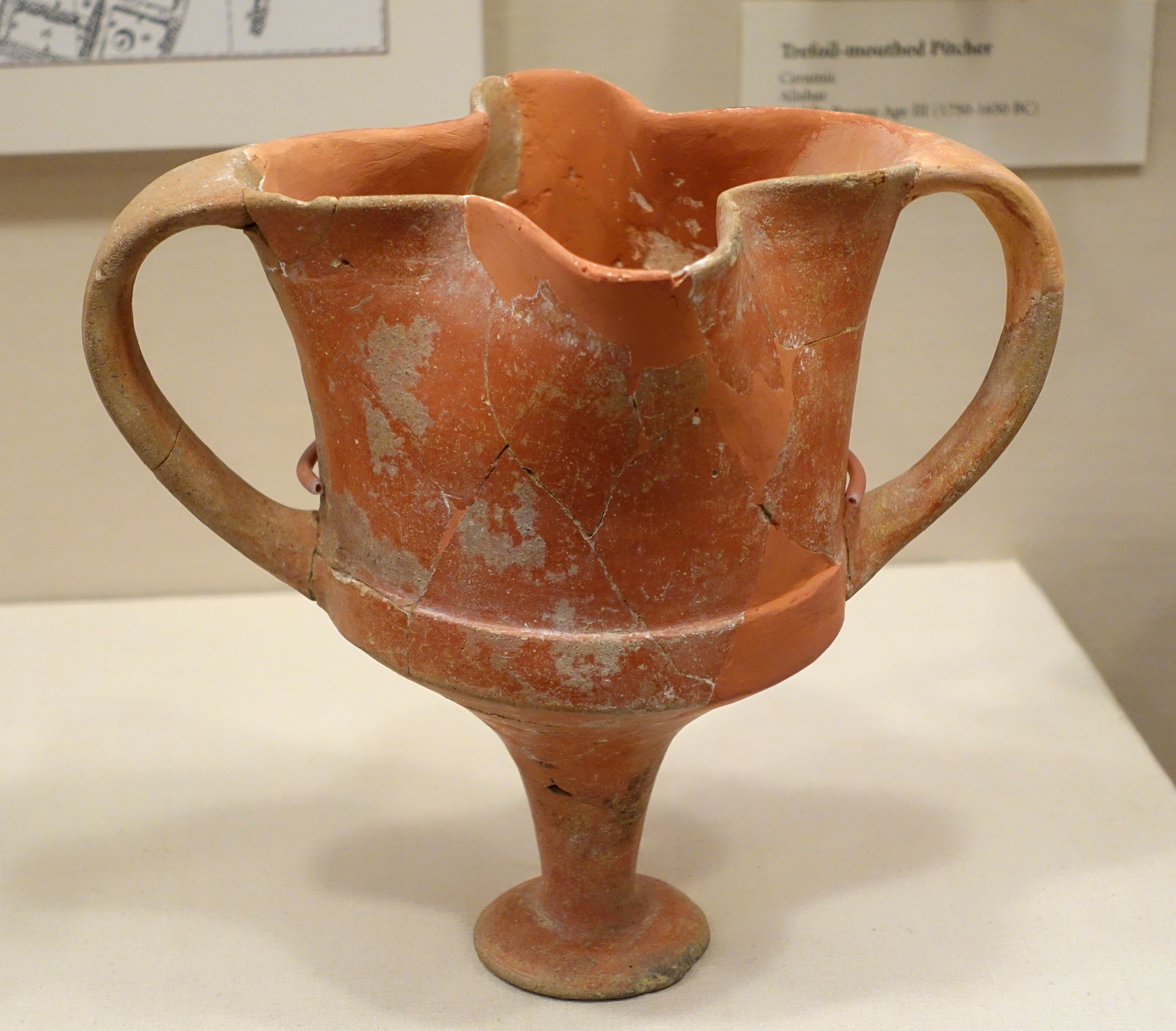
Vessel with a quatrefoil mouth, Alishar, Middle Bronze Age III, 1750-1650 BC, ceramic - Oriental Institute Museum

Fifty three (allowing for copies) cuneiform tablets in Old Assyrian of the Cappadocia type were found there. The tablets appear to be typical of an Assyrian trading outpost typical of that time in Anatolia. In two cases the writer mentions having returned from Zalpuwa (Zalpa) and in another Kanesh and Hattusa are referred to. One tablet mentions a trader Amur-Assur, also mentioned in tablets at the karum in Kultepe. Two of the tablets carry the seal of an "Anitta the Prince" which has led to speculation that this was Anitta who was king of Kuššara in the late 1700s BC.One tablet carried the eponym Adad-bāni which has been dated to the final years of Shamshi-Adad I (r. 1808-1775 BC) of the Kingdom of Upper Mesopotamia. Mention in those tablets of the town Ankuwa has caused speculation that the site is the Ankuwa mentioned in other Hittite texts.

=== Late Bronze Age ===
The Late Bronze IIB end of Hittite Empire (c. 1350-1190 BC) occupation (Stratum IV) at about 1200 BC was marked by widespread destruction including and the site was lightly unoccupied until Phryangian times.

=== Early Iron Age ===
After the "Late Bronze Age collapse" the site was resettled though the nature of that is unclear. In any case by the 8th century BC the Phrygians, whose origins are unclear, had re-settled Alişar Hüyük. A distinctive pottery from this period (early 1st millennium BC), Alişar-IV, is found at a number of sites in the region.

== Archaeology ==
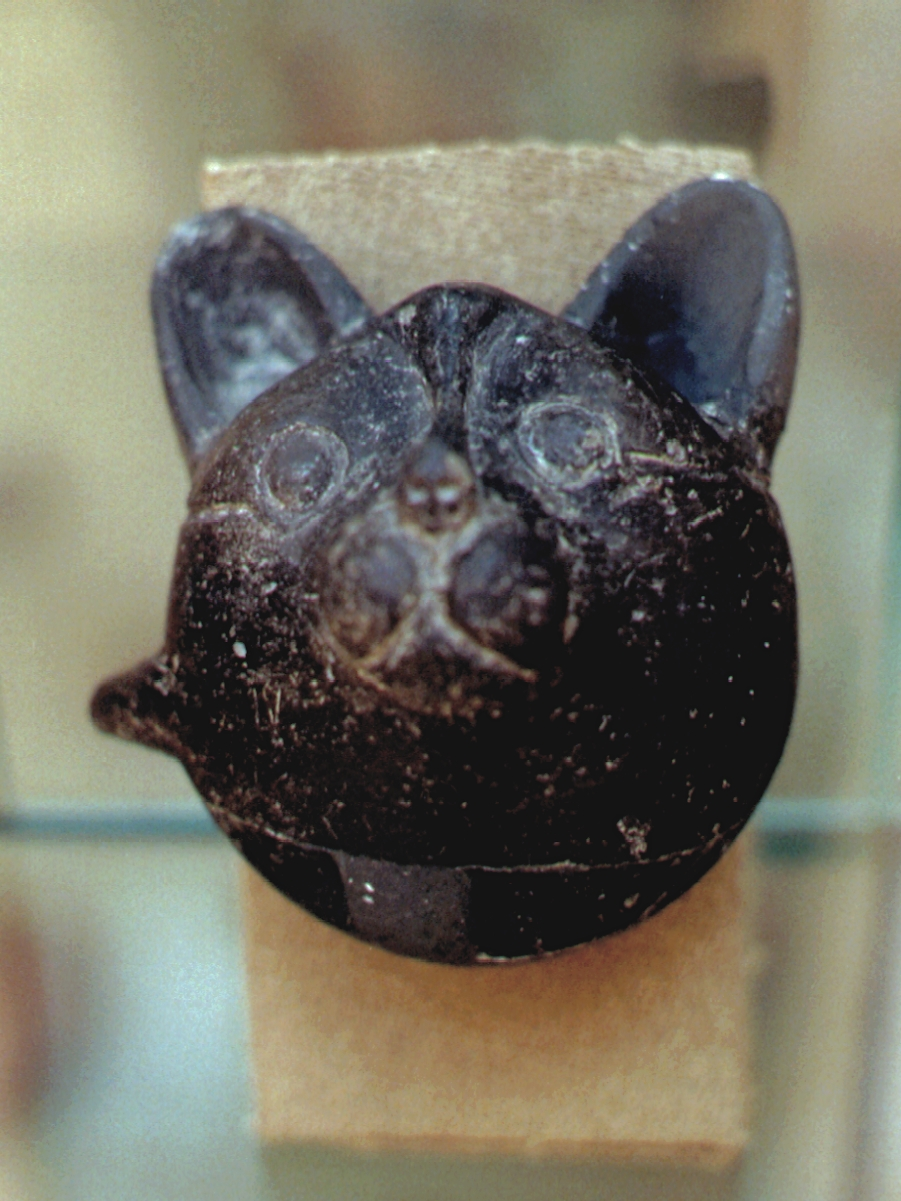
Head of an animal, pottery rhyton, 1700-1500 BC, MACA

The site covers an area of about 18 hectares. The top of the 30 meter high 245 meter by 145 meter main mound is surmounted by a truncated cone (designated A) with three lobes extending from it (B, C, and D). There is a 5 to 8 meter high terrace toward the northeast, east, south, and southwest which extends over a 520 meter by 380 meter area.

The site was excavated between 1927 and 1932 by a team from the Oriental Institute of Chicago. The work was led by Erich Schmidt. An excavation system of 10 by 10 meter oriented squares was used. Excavation resumed in 1992, led by Ronald Gorny as part of the Alisar Regional Project. Work at the site appears to have been limited to a topographic survey and aerial photography using camera ballons with little or no actual excavation. Most of the project's work has been at nearby Çadır Höyük.

Finds from the Late Chalcolithic and Early Bronze periods included a number of metal stamp seals of which a few have been published. While cylinder seals were also in use in the region, unlike in Mesopotamia stamp seals remained the primary sealing method in this region. The metal stamp seals were made of copper and of lead. A number of biconvex stamp seals were found at the site which enabled the determination that the site was occupied in the Late Bronze Age II period. Remains from that period are difficult to uncover because of disruption by Iron Age construction. Some of the inscribed stamp seals have hieroglyphic signs described as "presently indecipherable" by the epigrapher.

=== Stratigraphy ===
The stratigraphy of the site is difficult to interpret because the original excavators defined different strata for the main mound and for the terrace. In all there were 19 strata on the mound and 14 on the terrace. The Chalcolithic remains were only found on the main mound, strata 12T to 19T. Various later researchers have re-interpreted the excavation results is various ways.

Stratum	Period	Notes
I	Neolithic Age to Chalolithic Age	
II	Middle Bronze Age II	Cappadocian Tablets
III	Late Bronze Age I	Early Hittite
IV	Late Bronze Age II	Hittite
V	Iron Age	Phryangian to Medo-Persian
VI	Classical Age	Hellenistic, Roman and Byzantine
VII	Modern	Seljuk and Osmanli

== Gallery ==
Fragment of a large vessel with geometric decoration, Alishar, Iron Age II, 1000-700 BC, ceramic - Oriental Institute Museum

Pitcher with a trough-spout (burial gift), Alishar Building B, Middle Bronze Age III, 1750-1650 BC, ceramic - Oriental Institute Museum

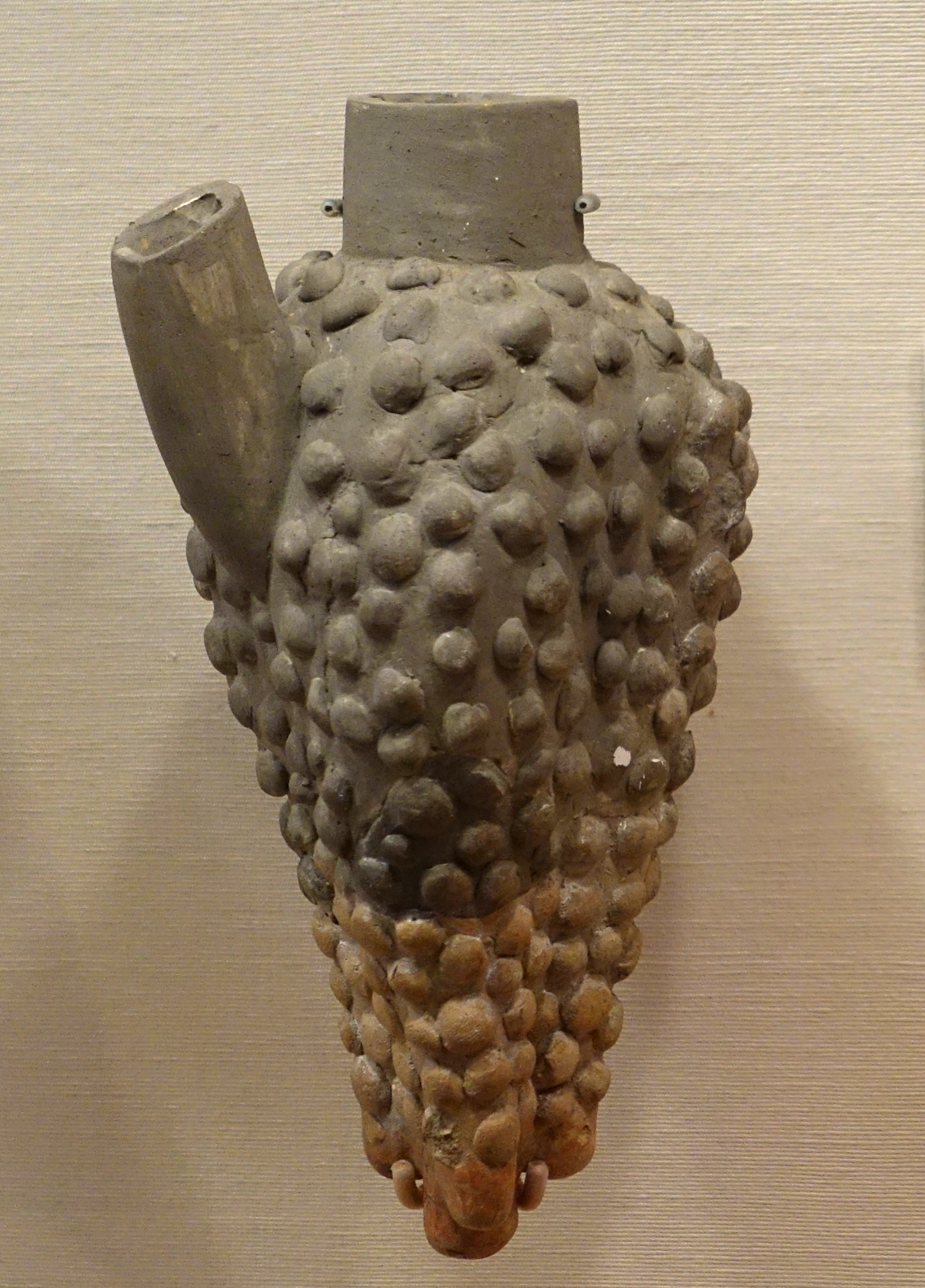
Ceremonial vessel (rhyton) in the shape of a grape cluster, Alishar, the Mansion, Middle Bronze Age, 1750-1650 BC, ceramic - Oriental Institute Museum

Pottery fragment with 'Cappadocian Symbol', Alishar, Middle Bronze Age III, 1759-1650 BC, ceramic - Oriental Institute Museum

== Çadır Höyük ==
About 12 kilometers northwest of Alishar Huyuk, there's another important archaeological site named Cadir Hoyuk (Çadır Höyük in Turkish alphabet). Recent excavators of Cadir Hoyuk have identified this site tentatively with the Hittite city of Zippalanda.

== See also ==
- Cities of the ancient Near East
- Karataş-Semayük
