= Karum (trade post) =

Ancient trade post

Central Anatolia during the karum period

Karum (Akkadian: kārum "quay, port, commercial district", plural kārū, from Sumerian kar "fortification (of a harbor), breakwater") is the name given to ancient Mesopotamian trade districts and posts.

== Etymology ==
The Akkadian word karum designated the mercantile quarter of ancient Mesopotamian cities. The karum was typically located on the city's main waterway just beyond its defensive fortifications to enable a regular flow of goods.

== History ==
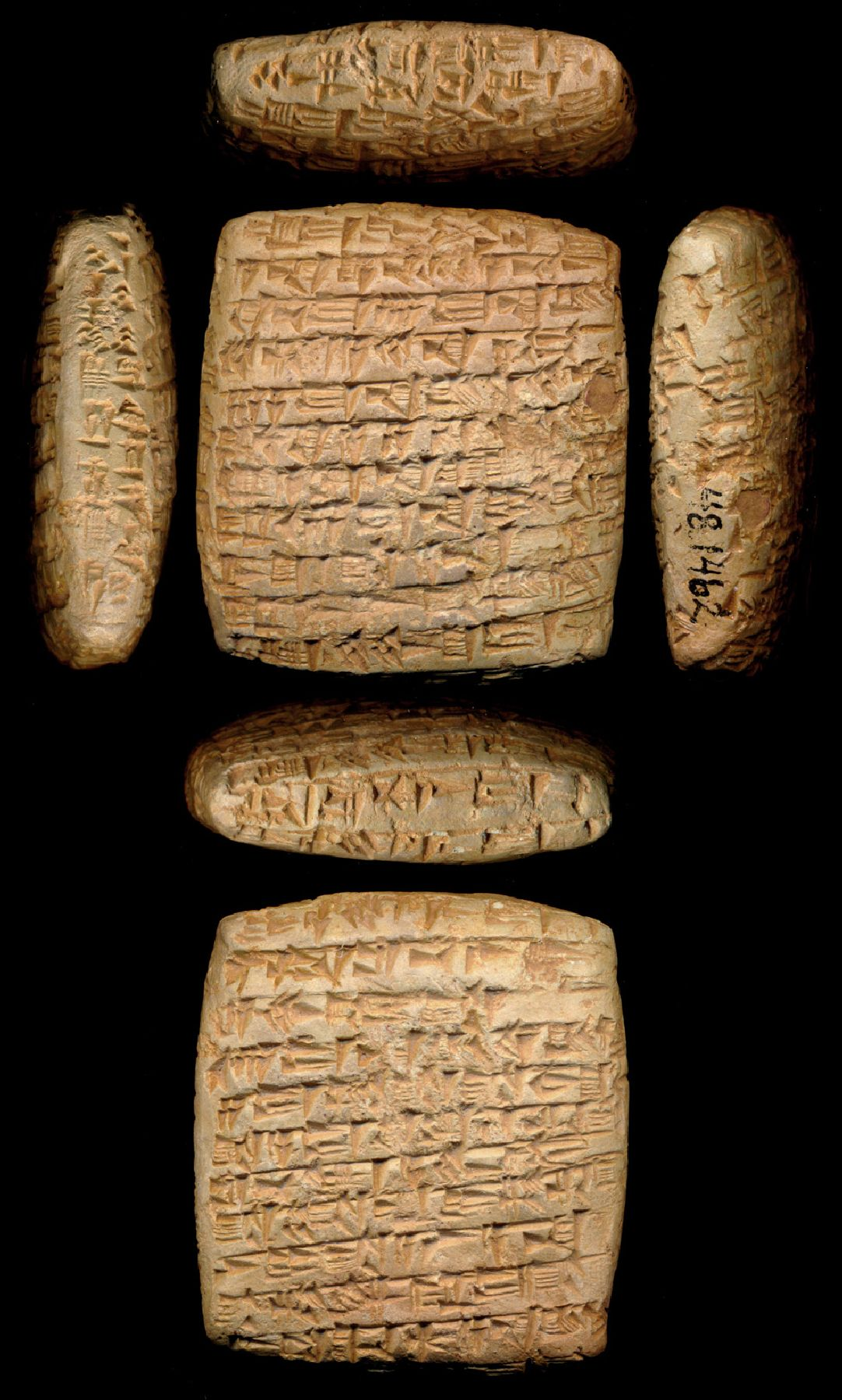
Letter from Assyria to karum Kanesh concerning the trade in precious metals. 1850–1700 BC. Walters Museum (click on image for more info)

Early references to karu come from the Ebla tablets; in particular, a vizier known as Ebrium concluded the earliest treaty fully known to archaeology, known as the Treaty between Ebla and Abarsal. Nevertheless, it is also sometimes referred to as the "Treaty between Ebla and Aššur", because some scholars have disputed whether the text refers to Aššur or to Abarsal, an unknown location. In any case, the other city contracted to establish karu in Eblaite territory (Syria), among other things.

During the 2nd millennium BC, Anatolia was under the sovereignty of Hatti and later Hittite city-states. By 1960 BC, Assyrian merchants had established the karu, small colonial settlements next to Anatolian cities, which paid taxes to the rulers of the cities. There were also smaller trade stations which were called mabartū (singular mabartum) or wabartum. The number of karu and mabartu was probably around 20. The most important karu were Kanesh (modern Kültepe in Kayseri Province), Purušhattum or Purushanda (possibly Acemhöyük), and Durhumit or Durmitta (modern location disputed). Others included Alişar Hüyük (Ankuva (?) in antiquity) in modern Yozgat Province (probably a mabartum) and Boğazköy (Hattusa in antiquity) in modern Çorum Province. After the establishment of the Hittite Empire, the karu disappeared from Anatolian history.

Sargon the Great (of Akkad) is said in a much-later Hittite account to have invaded Anatolia to punish Nurdaggal, the king of Purushanda, for mistreating the Akkadian and Assyrian merchant class in the karu there. However, no contemporary source mentions that to be the case.

== Trade ==
The Assyrian merchants purchased tin from the Iranian plateau and textiles from Babylonia and sold these products in Anatolia. In Anatolia, tin and textiles were traded for silver and gold, which was sent back to Assur. The Taurus Mountains of Anatolia were such an important source of silver that Mesopotamian sources referred to parts of the Taurus as the "Silver Mountains." Assyrian merchants were also involved in the local trade of copper within Anatolia. "A fairly conservative estimate of the Assyrian trade during the best-attested period 1895–1865 BCE reaches 1500 annual donkey-loads from Aššur to Anatolia, corresponding to several tons of tin and thousands of luxury fabrics." Although members of the Assyrian palace and temple hierarchy did act as investors, the karum trade was largely a profit-driven enterprise, rather than a state-sponsored one.

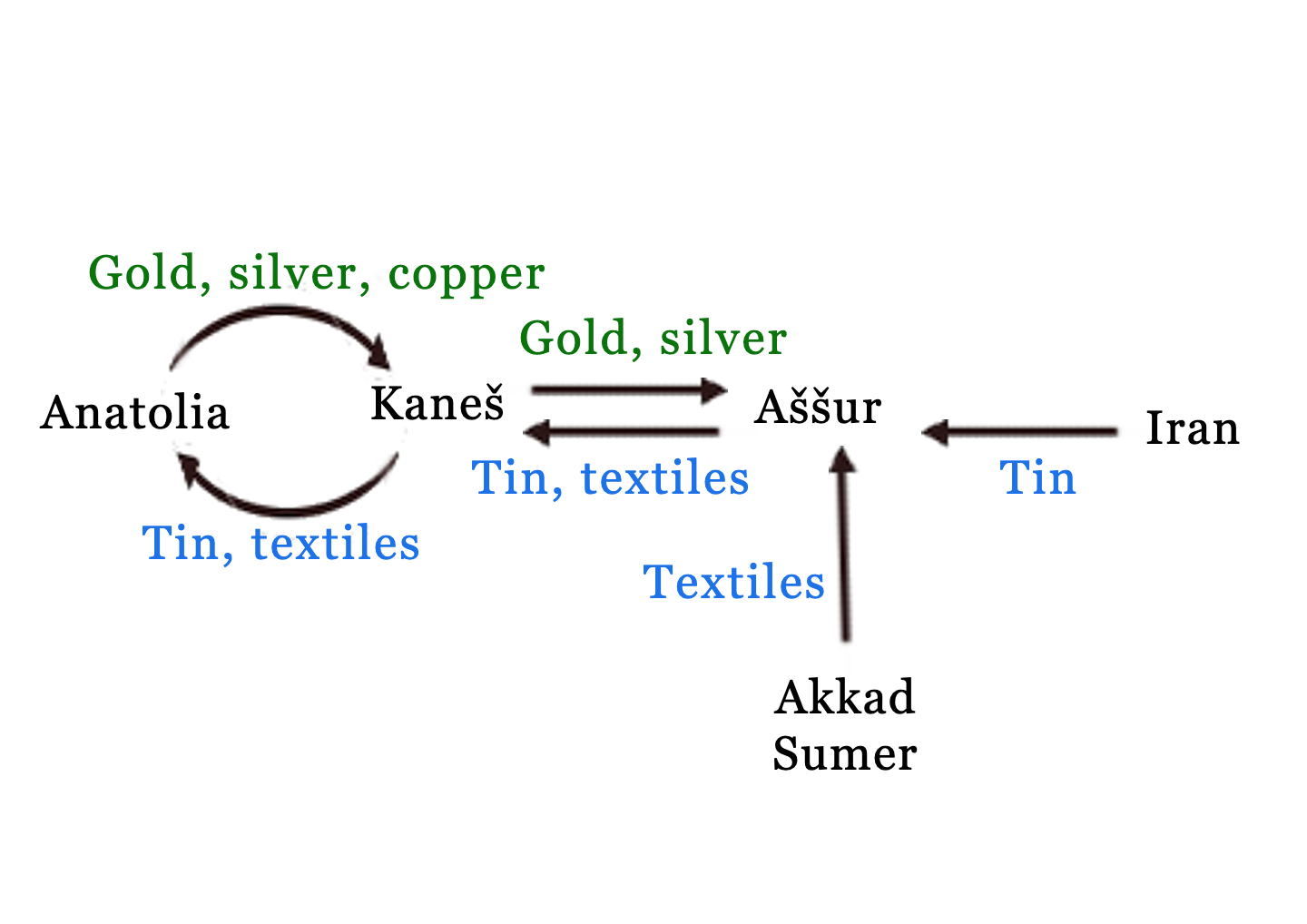
Trade patterns of karu

In the 2nd millennium BC, money was not yet in use. Assyrian merchants used gold for wholesale trade and silver for retail trade. Gold was considered eight times more valuable than silver. However, another metal, amutum, was even more valuable than gold. It is thought to be the newly discovered iron and was forty times more valuable than silver.

== Culture ==
Although the Assyrian merchants maintained long-term residence in Anatolia, they retained their Assyrian identity and continued Assyrian religious and cultural practices. However, the pottery and architecture used in the karums was based on local Anatolian types. Assyrian merchants married local Anatolian women.

== Documentation ==
Cuneiform tablets related to the karum trade constitute the oldest writing in Anatolia. The vast majority (over 22,400) of the karum tablets discovered thus far have come from the site of Kanesh, modern Kültepe, while around 100 have been found in other karum sites. All of these texts are written in the Old Assyrian dialect of Akkadian used by the Assyrian merchants rather than the indigenous Anatolian languages of the local population. Since the karum texts mention the names of local Anatolians, they are the oldest written evidence of the Hittite and Luwian languages.

Despite the fact that Assyrian merchants introduced cuneiform to Anatolia during the karum period, it does not appear that the karum system was directly involved in the later adoption of cuneiform for writing Hittite and other Anatolian languages. During the karum period, some local Anatolians used cuneiform to communicate in Akkadian. However, the first cuneiform texts in the Hittite language were not created until after the end of the karum period. The earliest form of cuneiform Hittite is most similar to the cuneiform used for the Old Babylonian dialect of Akkadian, which was likely introduced to Anatolia via the Syrian kingdoms.

== Legacy ==
The name Karum is given to an upscale shopping mall in Çankaya district of modern-day Ankara, Turkey. It is a reference to the presence of karu in Asia Minor since the very early days of history. Another mall in Ankara's Bilkent district is given the name Ankuva. That is also a reference to archaeological discoveries of various karu in Central Anatolia.
