= Ankuwa =

Ankuwa was an ancient Hattian and Hittite settlement in central Anatolia. Along with Hattusa and Katapa, it was one of the capitals from which the Hittite kings reigned during the year. Travelling from Hattusa, the royal entourage would arrive at Imralla on the first night, Hobigassa on the second, and Ankuwa on the third.

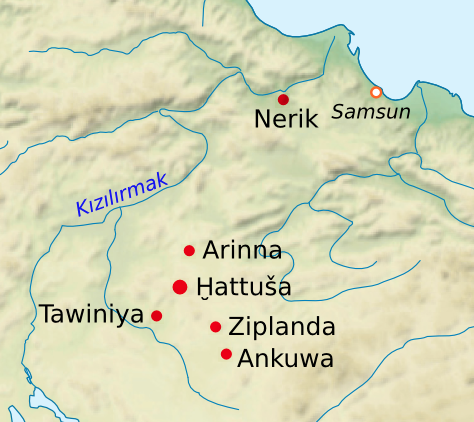

The settlement has been linked to modern Ankara for etymological reasons, but Hittite sources have been discovered to place the settlement along the southern bend of the Marrassandtiya River, the modern Kızılırmak. Alishar Hüyük has also been suggested as a location.

== Sources ==
- "Ankuva." Reallexikon der Assyriologie. [German.]
