= Troy =

Ancient city in northwest Asia Minor

- 𒌷𒃾𒇻𒊭; Ἴλιον (Wiluša)
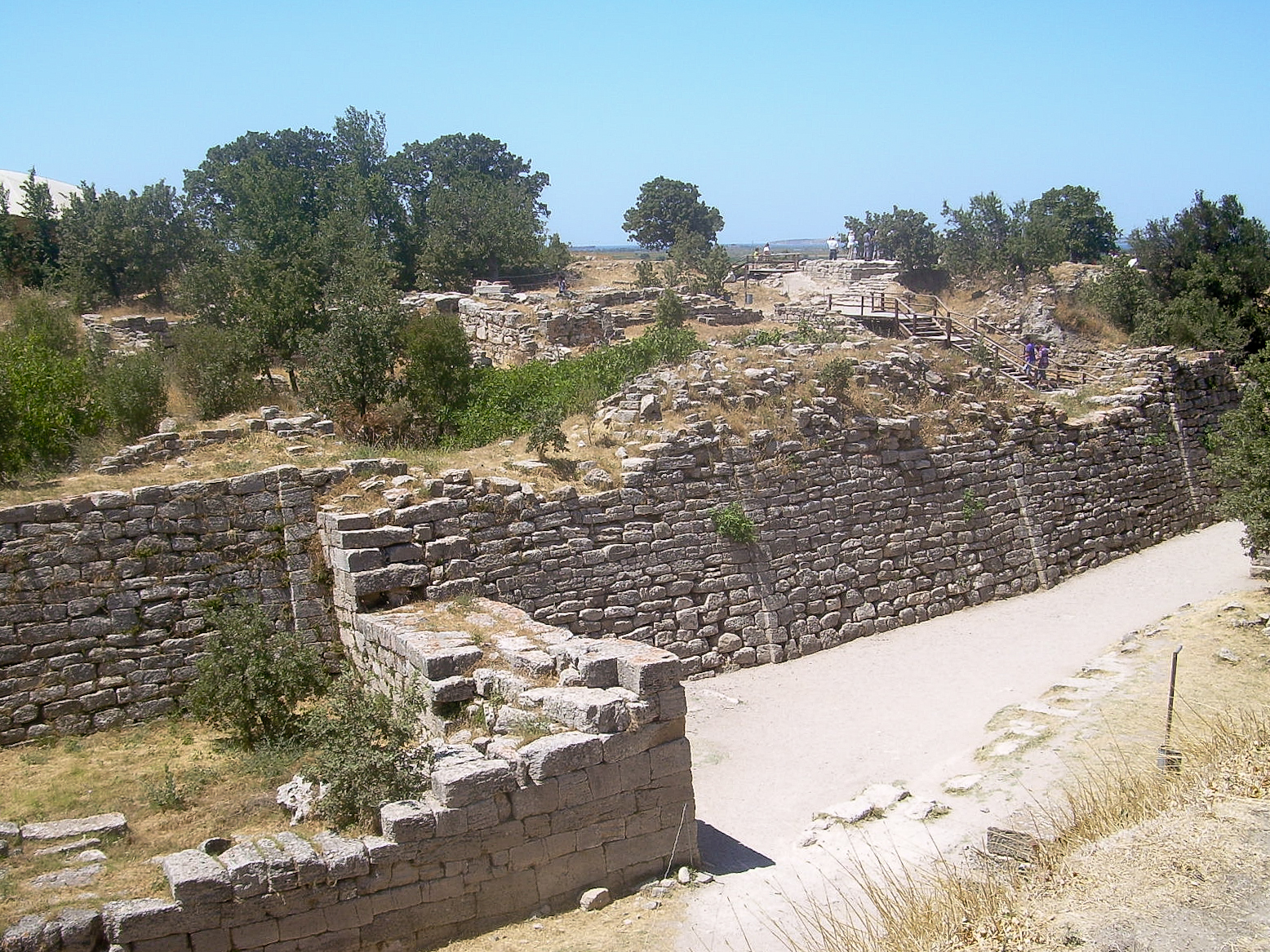
- Walls of Late Bronze Age Troy

- Location within Marmara Location within Turkey Location within Greece
- 39°57′27″N 26°14′20″E
- Location: Çanakkale District, Çanakkale Province, Turkey
- Region: Troad
- Part of: Historical National Park of Troia

Site notes
- Archaeologists: Frank Calvert, Heinrich Schliemann
- Website: whc.unesco.org/en/list/849/

UNESCO World Heritage Site
- Type: Cultural
- Designated: 1998 (22nd session)
- Reference no.: 849
- UNESCO Region: Europe and North America

Troy or Ilion was an ancient city located in present-day Çanakkale, Turkey. It is best known as the setting for the Greek myth of the Trojan War. The modern-day archaeological site, also known as Hisarlık, is open to the public as a tourist destination, and was added to the UNESCO World Heritage list in 1998.

Troy was repeatedly destroyed and rebuilt during its 4000 years of settlement. As a result, nine archaeological layers have been identified at the site, each corresponding to a city built on the ruins of the previous. Archaeologists refer to these layers using Roman numerals, Troy I being the earliest and Troy IX being the latest.

Troy was first settled around 3600 BC and grew into a small fortified city around 3000 BC (Troy I). Among the early layers, Troy II is notable for its wealth and imposing architecture. During the Late Bronze Age, Troy was called Wilusa and was a vassal of the Hittite Empire. The final layers (Troy VIII–IX) were Greek and Roman cities which served as tourist attractions and religious centers because of their link to mythic tradition.

The site was excavated by Frank Calvert and Heinrich Schliemann from 1871. Under the ruins of the classical city, they found the remains of numerous earlier settlements. Several of these layers resemble literary depictions of Troy, leading some scholars to conclude that there is a kernel of truth underlying the legends. Subsequent excavations by others have added to the modern understanding of the site, though the exact relationship between myth and reality remains unclear and there is no definitive evidence for a Greek attack on the city.

== Name ==
In Classical Greek, the city was referred to as both Troia (Τροία) and Ilion (Ἴλιον) or Ilios (Ἴλιος), hence the name of the epic poem: the Iliad. Metrical evidence from the Iliad and the Odyssey suggests that the latter was originally pronounced Wilios. These names seem to date back to the Bronze Age, as suggested by Hittite records which refer to a city in northwest Anatolia called Wilusa (𒌷𒃾𒇻𒊭) or Truwisa (𒆳𒌷𒋫𒊒𒄿𒊭) which is now generally identified with the archaeological site of Hisarlık, near Tevfikiye. In Greek myth, these names were held to originate from the names of the kingdom's founders, Tros and his son Ilus.

In Latin, the city was referred to as Troia or Ilium. In Turkish, it is generally known as Troya or Truva.

== Identification and excavation ==
=== Classical literature ===
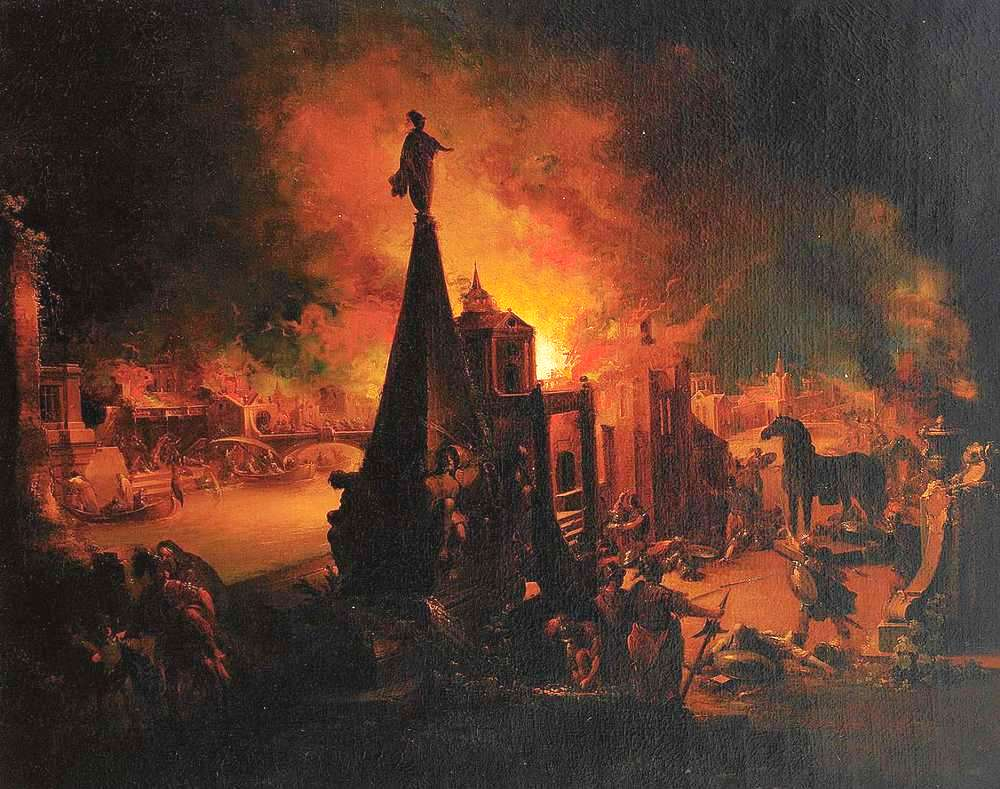
An 18th-century depiction of the legendary sack of Troy

The main literary work set at Troy is the Iliad, an Archaic-era epic poem which tells the story of the final year of the Trojan War. The Iliad portrays Troy as the capital of a rich and powerful kingdom. In the poem, the city appears to be a major regional power capable of summoning numerous allies to defend it. (Note: "And Troy prevails by armies not her own". "Assemble all the united bands of Troy; / In just array let every leader call / The foreign troops: this day demands them all.") The city itself is described as sitting on a steep hill, protected by enormous sloping stone walls, rectangular towers, and massive gates whose wooden doors can be bolted shut. According to Dares Phrygius, there were 6 such gates – the Antenorean, the Dardanian, the Ilian, the Scaean, the Thymbraean, and the Trojan. The city's streets are broad and well-planned. At the top of the hill is the Temple of Athena as well as King Priam's palace, an enormous structure with numerous rooms around an inner courtyard.

In the Iliad, the Achaeans set up their camp near the mouth of the Scamander river, where they beached their ships. The city itself stood on a hill across the plain of Scamander, where much of the fighting takes place.

Besides the Iliad, there are references to Troy in the other major work attributed to Homer, the Odyssey, as well as in other ancient Greek literature, such as Aeschylus's Oresteia. The Homeric legend of Troy was elaborated by the Roman poet Virgil in his Aeneid. The fall of Troy with the story of the Trojan Horse and the sacrifice of Polyxena, Priam's youngest daughter, is the subject of a later Greek epic by Quintus Smyrnaeus ("Quintus of Smyrna").

The Greeks and Romans took for a fact the historicity of the Trojan War and the identity of Homeric Troy with a site in Anatolia on a peninsula called the Troad (Biga Peninsula). Alexander the Great, for example, visited the site in 334 BC and there made sacrifices at tombs associated with the Homeric heroes Achilles and Patroclus.

=== Early modern era ===
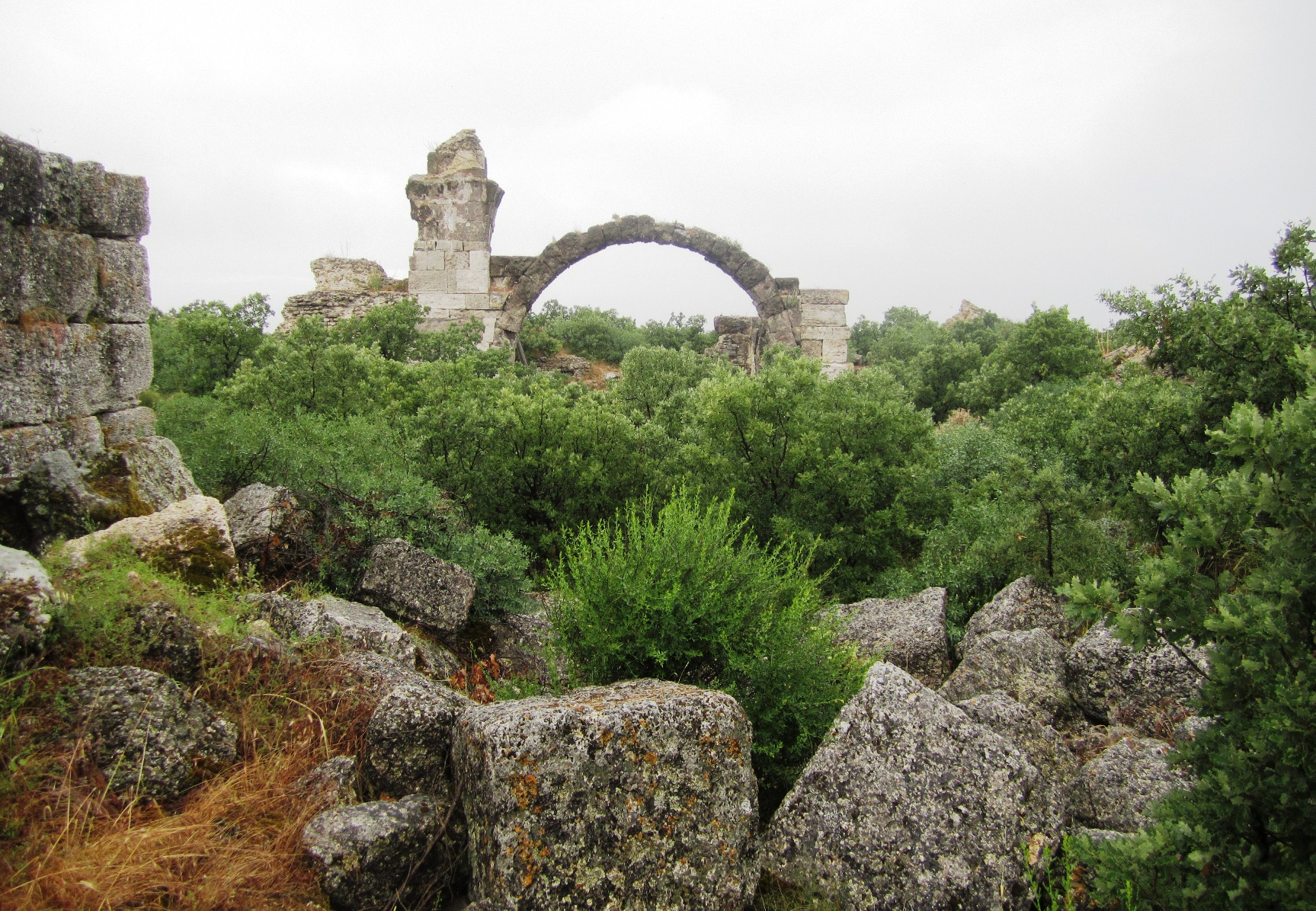
Alexandria Troas

Early modern travellers in the 16th and 17th centuries, including Pierre Belon and Pietro Della Valle, had mistakenly identified Troy with Alexandria Troas, a ruined Hellenistic town approximately 20 kilometres (12 mi) south of Hisarlık. In the late 18th century, French scholar Jean-Baptiste le Chevalier identified a location near the village of Pınarbaşı, Ezine, a mound approximately 5 kilometres (3.1 mi) south of the currently accepted location. Published in his Voyage de la Troade, it was the most commonly proposed location for almost a century.

In 1822, the Scottish journalist Charles Maclaren was the first to identify with confidence the position of the city as it is now known. The first excavations at the site were trenches by British civil engineer John Brunton in 1855.

=== Frank Calvert ===
The next excavation at Hisarlık was conducted in 1865 by Frank Calvert, a man of English descent who owned a farm nearby. Calvert made extensive surveys of the site and correctly identified it with classical-era Ilion. This identification convinced Heinrich Schliemann that Homeric Troy should be sought beneath the classical-era remains and led to their subsequent partnership.

=== Heinrich Schliemann ===
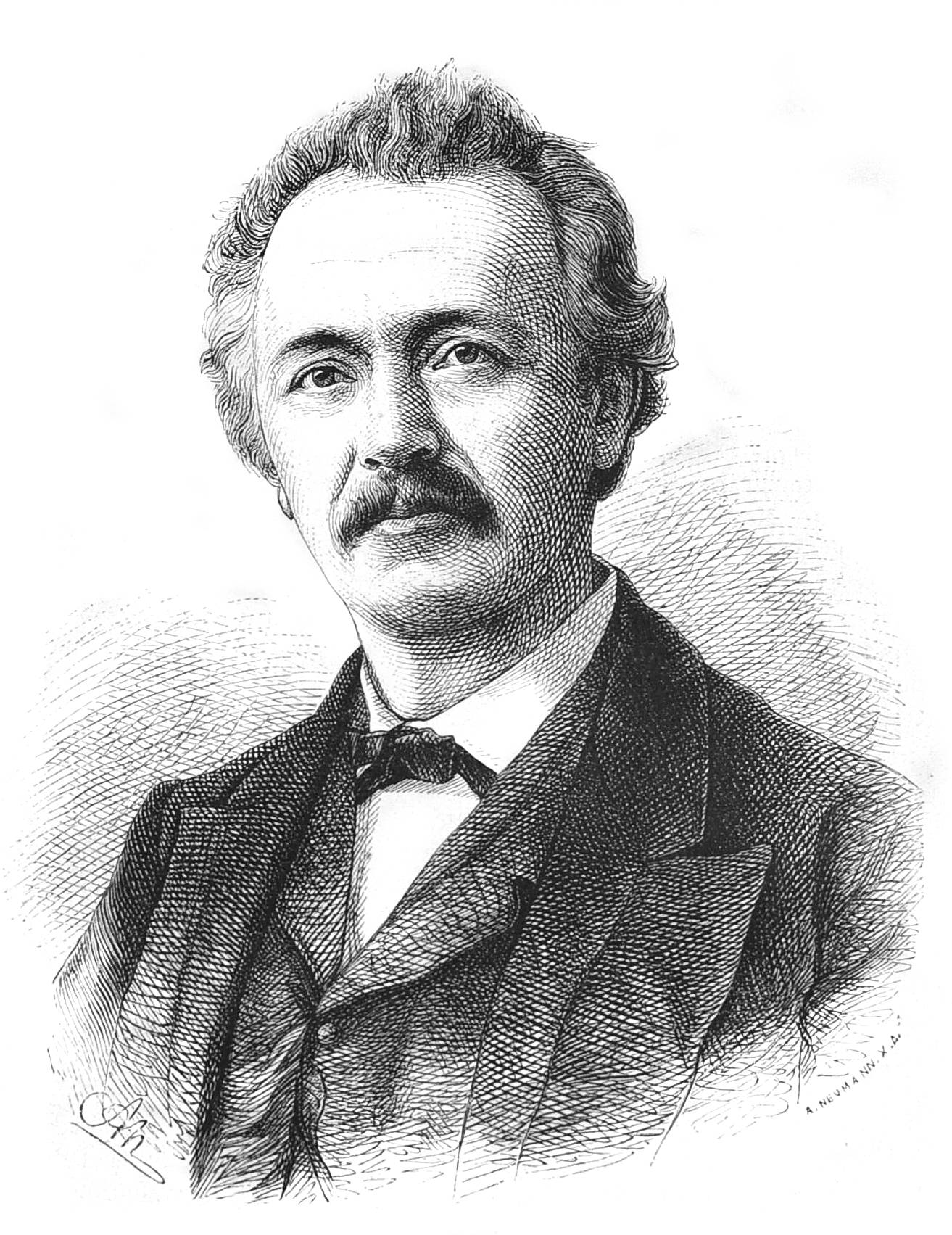
Heinrich Schliemann

In 1868, German businessman Heinrich Schliemann visited Calvert, and secured permission to excavate Hisarlık. At this point in time, the mound was about 200 meters long and somewhat less than 150 meters wide. It rose 31.2 meters above the plain and 38.5 meters above sea level.

As with Calvert and others, in April 1870 Schliemann began by excavating a trench across the mound of Hisarlık to the depth of the settlements, today called "Schliemann's Trench". In 1871–1873 and 1878–1879, 1882 and 1890 (the later two joined by Wilhelm Dörpfeld), he discovered the ruins of a series of ancient cities dating from the Bronze Age to the Roman period. Schliemann was planning for another excavation season in 1891 when he died in December 1890. He proposed that the second layer, Troy II, corresponded to the city of legend, though later research has shown that it predated the Mycenaean era by several hundred years. Significant finds included many "owl-headed idols" and stone axes from the lower levels.

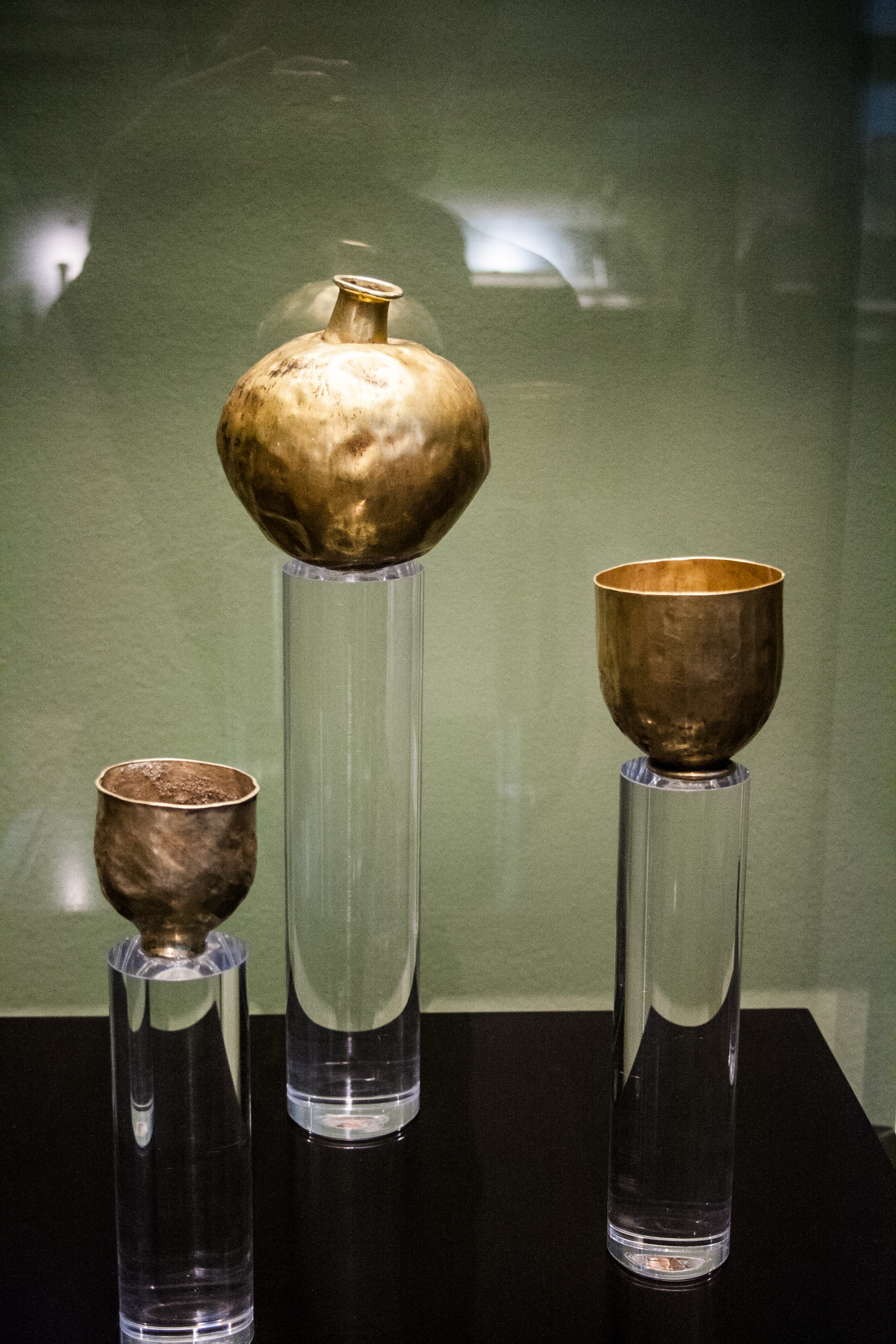
Golden bottle and goblets from Priam's Treasure, Pushkin Museum

Some of the most notable artefacts found by Schliemann are known as Priam's Treasure, after the legendary Trojan king. Schliemann and his wife stole almost all the precious metal objects and ancient jewelry. Later Schliemann traded some of the treasure to the government of the Ottoman Empire in exchange for permission to dig at Troy again. These are located in the Istanbul Archaeology Museum. The rest was acquired in 1881 by the Royal Museums of Berlin (Königliche Museen zu Berlin) and later got confiscated by the Soviet Union in 1945 as a compensation for looting of Russian museums by Nazi Germany. They are now located in Pushkin Museum in Moscow. Even in his own time Schliemann was controversial because of his excavation methods which included removing features he considered insignificant without first studying and documenting them.

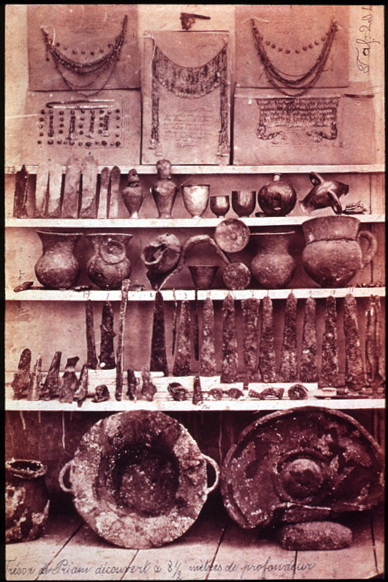
Artifacts which Schliemann dubbed Priam's Treasure

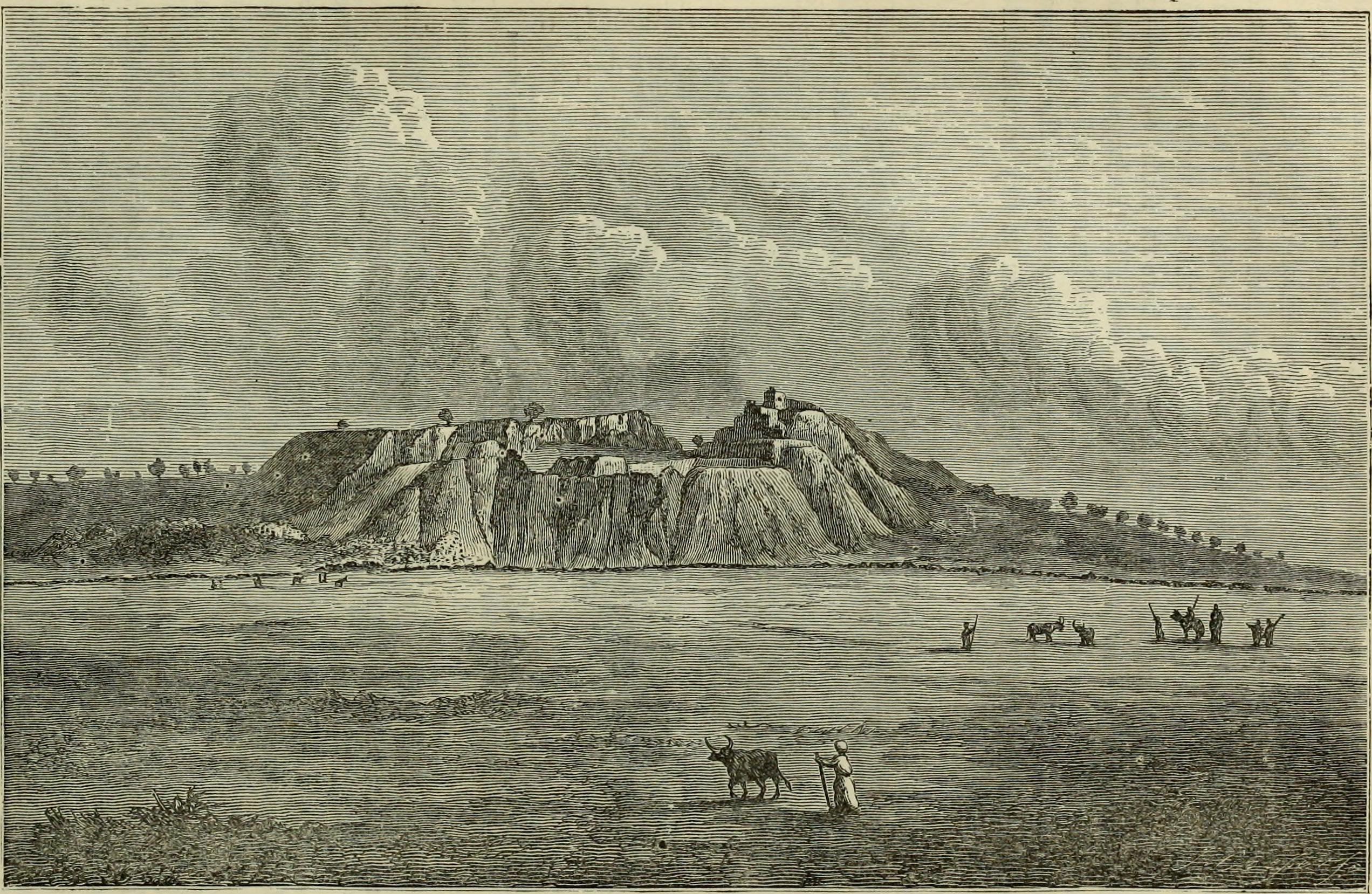
Hisarlık, pictured in 1880. The notch at the top is "Schliemann's Trench".

=== Wilhelm Dörpfeld ===
Wilhelm Dörpfeld (1893–1894) began working the site alongside Schliemann and later inherited excavation at the site and published his own independent work. His chief contributions were to the study of Troy VI and VII, which Schliemann had overlooked due to his focus on Troy II. Dörpfeld's interest in these layers was triggered by the need to close a hole in the initial excavators' chronology known as "Calvert's Thousand Year Gap". During his excavation, Dörpfeld came across a section of the Troy VI wall which was weaker than the rest. Since the mythic city had likewise had a weak section of its walls, Dörpfeld became convinced that this layer corresponded to Homeric Troy. Schliemann himself privately agreed that Troy VI was more likely to be the Homeric city, but he never published anything stating so.

=== Carl Blegen ===
Carl Blegen, professor at the University of Cincinnati, managed the site from 1932 to 1938. Wilhelm Dörpfeld collaborated with Blegen. These archaeologists, though following Schliemann's lead, added a professional approach not available to Schliemann. He showed that there were at least nine cities. In his research, Blegen came to a conclusion that Troy's nine levels could be further divided into forty-six sublevels, which he published in his main report. A post hoc correspondence analysis of Blegen's pottery sequence showed a 100-year gap between Troy III and Troy IV. Combined with a similar analysis of the pottery sequences of Korfmann and Schliemann this suggests that for a time in the late Early Bronze Age occupation contracted to the western end of the citadel mound.

=== Manfred Korfmann ===
From 1988 to 2005, excavations were conducted by a team from the University of Tübingen and the University of Cincinnati under the direction of Professor Manfred Korfmann, with Professor Brian Rose overseeing Post-Bronze Age (Greek, Roman, Byzantine) excavation along the coast of the Aegean Sea at the Bay of Troy. Possible evidence of a battle was found in the form of bronze arrowheads and fire-damaged human remains buried in layers dated to the early 12th century BC. The question of Troy VI's status in the Bronze-Age world was the subject of a sometimes acerbic debate between Korfmann and the Tübingen historian Frank Kolb in 2001–2002.

One of the major discoveries of these excavations was the Troy VI–VII lower city. This lower town had a wide anti-chariot defensive ditch backed by a wooden palisade. Added to the citadel this lower town would have brought Troy up to an area of around 200,000 square meters. This discovery led to a major reinterpretation of the site, which had previously been regarded as a small aristocratic residence rather than a major settlement.

A number of radiocarbon dates, from charcoal samples, were obtained from various phases of the Troy I level.

From 2006 until 2012, these excavations continued under the direction of Korfmann's colleague Ernst Pernicka, with a new digging permit.

=== Developments in the 21st century ===
In 2013, an international team made up of cross-disciplinary experts led by William Aylward, an archaeologist at the University of Wisconsin-Madison, was to carry out new excavations. This activity was to be conducted under the auspices of Çanakkale Onsekiz Mart University and was to use the new technique of "molecular archaeology". A few days before the Wisconsin team was to leave, the Turkish government cancelled about 100 excavation permits throughout Turkey, including Wisconsin's.

Since 2014 excavations have been conducted by a Çanakkale Onsekiz Mart University team led by Rüstem Aslan. The excavators claim to have found a "Level 0" at Troy near the entrance of Troy-II with the new level pushing the city's history back 600 years. Since 2016 the University of Amsterdam has conducted a project to examine the 150-year history of excavation at the site.

== Archaeological site ==
Schematic of the site (Note: 1: Gate 2: City Wall 3: Megarons 4: FN Gate 5: FO Gate 6: FM Gate and Ramp 7: FJ Gate 8: City Wall 9: Megarons 10: City Wall 11: VI. S Gate 12: VI. H Tower 13: VI. R Gate 14: VI. G Tower 15: Well-Cistern 16: VI. T Dardanos Gate 17: VI. I Tower 18: VI. U Gate 19: VI. A House 20: VI. M Palace-Storage House 21: Pillar House 22: VI. F House with columns 23: VI. C House 24: VI. E House 25: VII. Storage 26: Temple of Athena 27: Propylaeum 28: Outer Court Wall 29: Inner Court Wall 30: Holy Place 31: Water Work 32: Bouleuterion 33: Odeon 34: Bath)

The archaeological site of Troy consists of the hill of Hisarlık and the fields below it to the south. The hill is a tell, composed of strata containing the remains left behind by more than three millennia of human occupation.

The primary divisions among layers are designated with Roman numerals, Troy I representing the oldest layer and Troy IX representing the most recent. Sublayers are distinguished with lowercase letters (e.g. VIIa and VIIb) and further subdivisions with numbers (e.g. VIIb1 and VIIb2). An additional major layer known as Troy 0 predates the layers which were initially given Roman numeral designations.

The layers have been given relative dates by comparing artefacts found in them to those found at other sites. However, precise absolute dates are not always possible due to limitations in the accuracy of radiocarbon dating.

Layer	Dates	Period (Note: The periodization of the Western Anatolian Bronze Age differs from divisions used in other areas.)
Troy 0	3600–3000 BC	Neolithic and Early Bronze Age
Troy I	3000–2550 BC	Early Bronze Age
Troy II	2500–2300 BC	Early Bronze Age
Troy III	2300–2200 BC	Early Bronze Age
Troy IV	2200–2000 BC	Early Bronze Age
Troy V	2000–1750 BC	Early Bronze Age
Troy VI	1750–1300 BC	Middle Bronze Age and Late Bronze Age
Troy VIIa	1300–1180 BC	Late Bronze Age
Troy VIIb	1180–950 BC	Late Bronze Age and Dark Age
Troy VIII	950–85 BC	Classical and Hellenistic
Troy IX	85 BCE–500 AD	Roman

=== Troy 0 ===
Troy 0 is a pre-Bronze Age layer known from limited finds of pottery sherds and wooden beams. It is tentatively dated to c. 3600–3500 BC but little is known about it.

=== Troy I ===
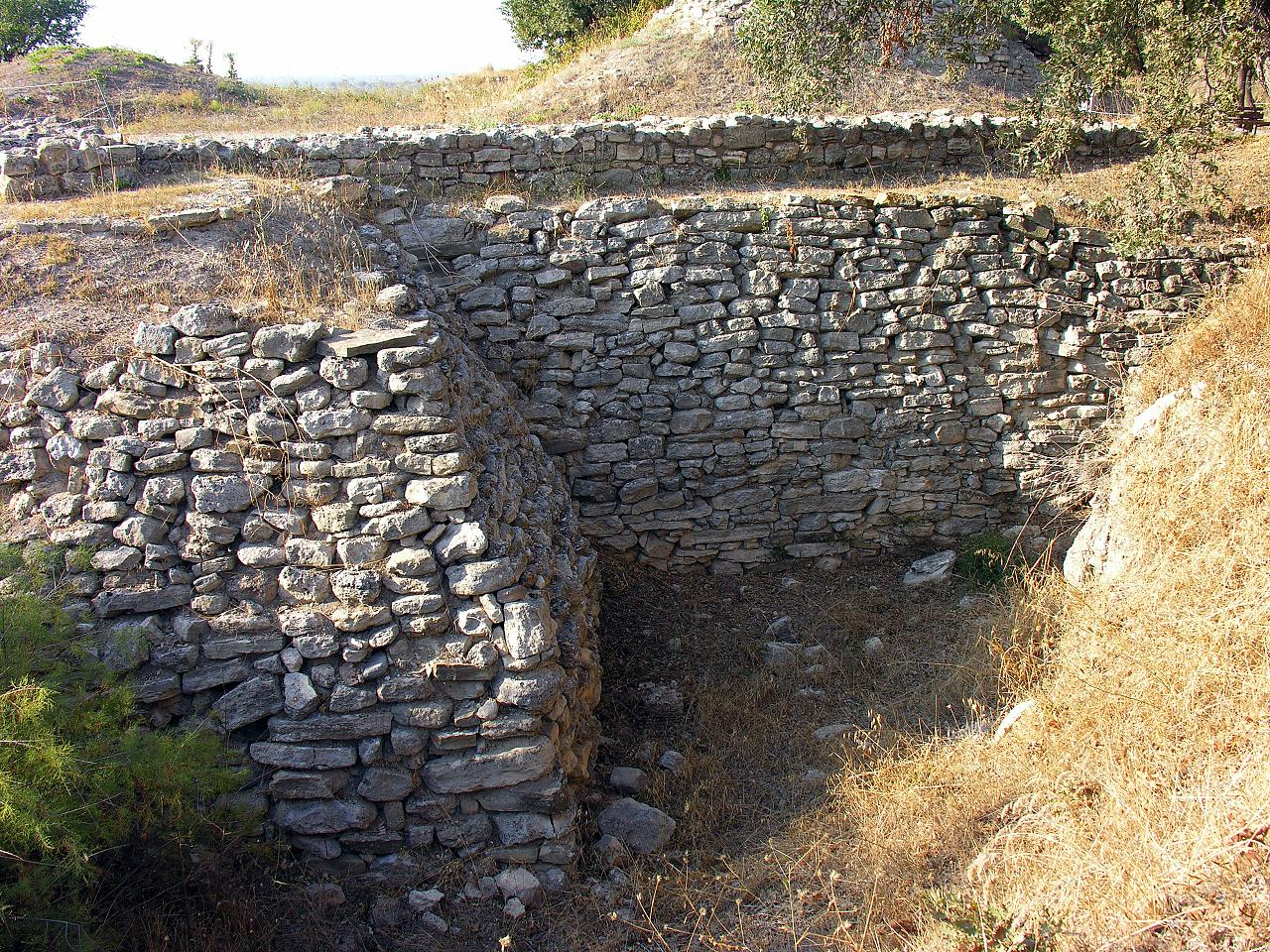
Troy I's fortifications were the most elaborate in northwestern Anatolia at the time.

Troy I was founded around 3000 BC on what was then the eastern shore of a shallow lagoon. It was significantly smaller than later settlements at the site, with a citadel covering less than 1 ha (2 acres). However it stood out from its neighbours in particular for its massive limestone fortifications, which were regularly renovated and strengthened. Defensive architecture would continue to be a distinctive characteristic in later periods, reflecting perennial security concerns at the vulnerable coastal site.

Residents lived in attached houses made of stone and mudbrick. Some houses had a megaron layout, among which one room is notably larger than the others. Although the city plan is not entirely clear from its limited remains, the houses appear to have been oriented parallel to the southern walls. Artifacts from this era include dark-coloured handmade pottery, objects made of copper, as well as a monumental stone stele with a relief depicting an armed warrior.

Troy I was founded as part of a consolidation of settlement in the area. Its founders came from nearby towns such as Kumtepe and Gülpınar, which had been part of an earlier network that had cultural and economic ties to the eastern Aegean and southeastern Europe. Troy itself appears to have maintained these connections, showing similarities to sites in Thessaly and southeastern Europe, as well as Aegean sites such as Poliochni in Lemnos and Thermi in Lesbos. Despite some connections to Anatolian sites including Bademağacı, it did not then have the close ties with central Anatolia seen later.

Troy I was destroyed by fire around 2550 BC.

=== Troy II ===
Troy II was built around 2550 BC. Although there is no evidence of a cultural break after the previous settlement, the new city had a very different character. It was twice the size of the preceding city, featuring a lower town as well as an expanded citadel divided into two precincts. These precincts, divided by colonnades, suggest growing socio-political stratification in Trojan society. At the centre were large megaron-style buildings around a courtyard, which was likely used for public events. One of these buildings, Megaron IIA, is the biggest-known building of its kind in the Aegean-Anatolian region.

The citadel was protected by massive stone walls and towers topped with mud-brick superstructures. It was accessed via two ramps, one of which is well preserved and attracts attention from modern-day tourists. Because the city was not large enough to require two gates for practical purposes, some archaeologists have speculated that one of the gates was intended for ceremonial processions. The lower city was protected by a wooden palisade unlike any other known in that era. It was a complex structure nearly 3 metres wide, with interior buttresses and columns and beams secured in notches cut into the bedrock.

Wheel-made pottery appears at the site for the first time, along with caches of treasures that attest to Trojan participation in networks of aristocratic competition. These items were made from amber imported from the Baltic region, carnelian imported from India and lapis imported from Afghanistan. Some of these items are strikingly similar to those found at sites such as Poliochni and Ur, leading some scholars to speculate that they may have been made by itinerant jewellers who worked routes covering much of the Ancient Near East.

Troy II was destroyed twice. After the first destruction, the citadel was rebuilt with a dense cluster of small houses on an irregular plan. The final destruction took place around 2300 BC. While some scholars have linked this destruction to a broader crisis that affected other Near Eastern sites, there is no definitive evidence for the city having been destroyed by an attack.

Troy II is notable for having been misidentified as Homeric Troy, during initial excavations, because of its massive architecture, treasure hoards, and catastrophic destruction. In particular Schliemann saw Homer's description of Troy's Scaean Gate reflected in Troy II's imposing western gate. However, later excavations demonstrated that the site was a thousand years too old to have coexisted with Mycenaean Greece.

Troy II
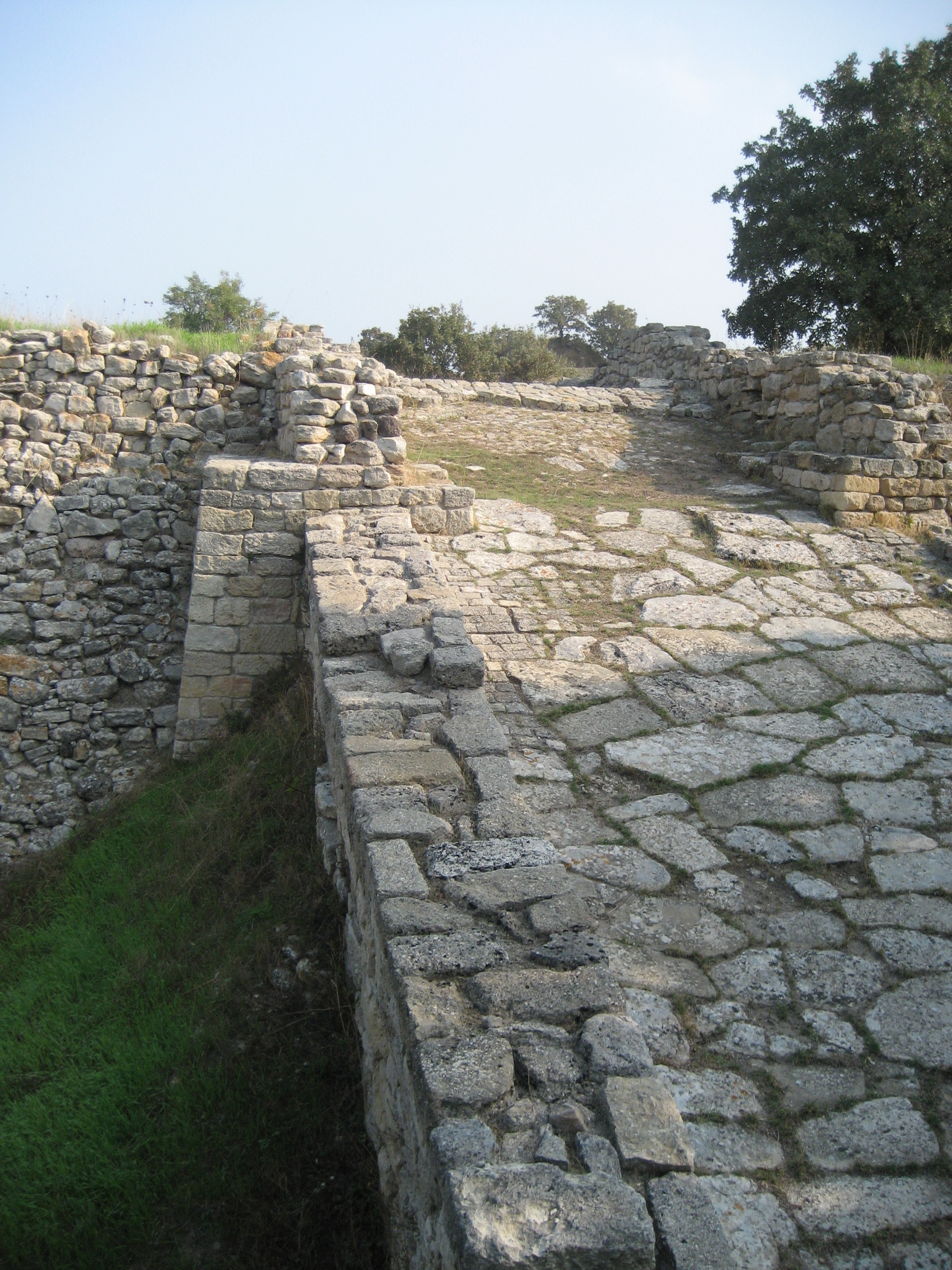
Southwest ramp of Troy II

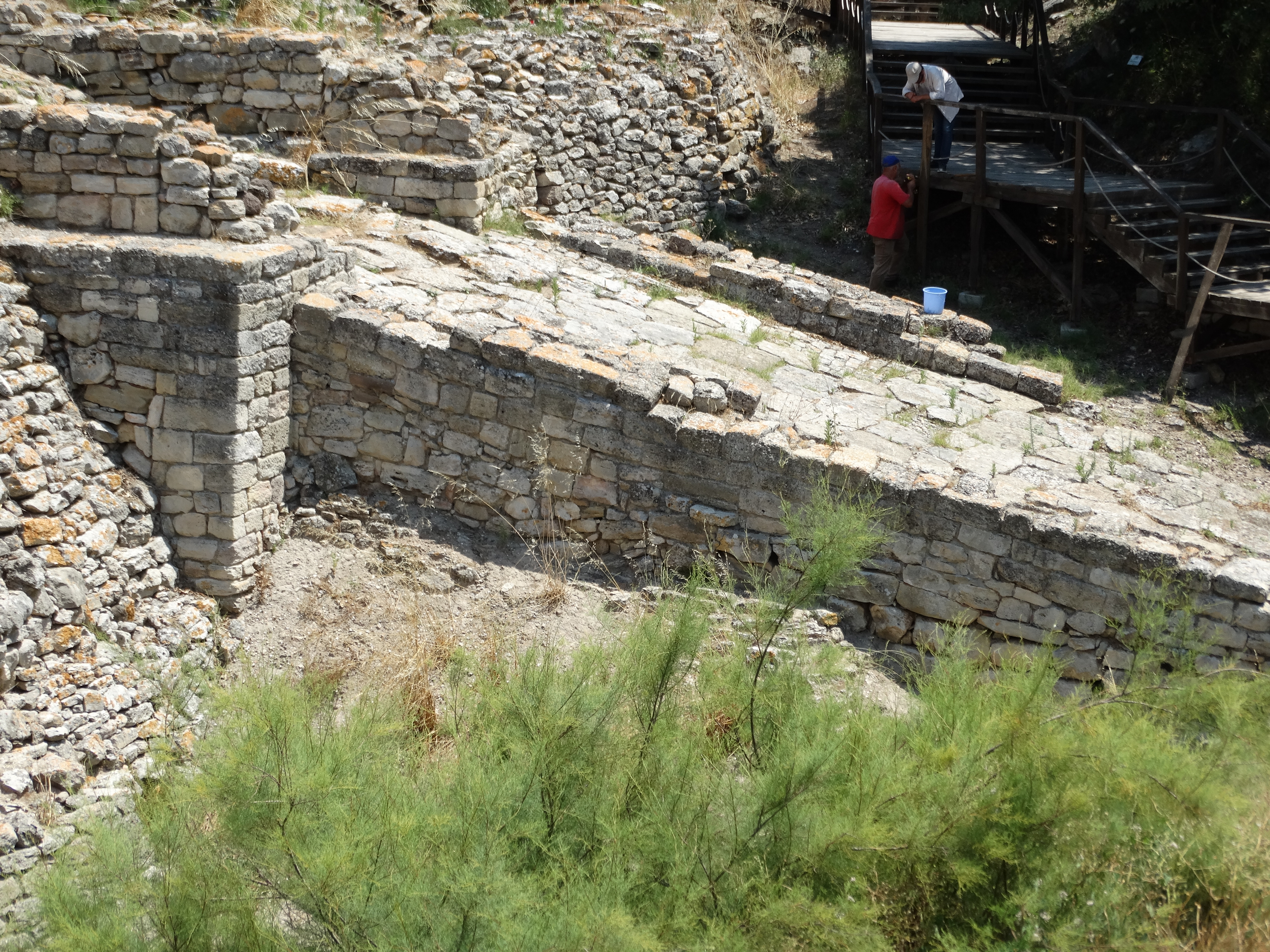
Side view of southwest ramp

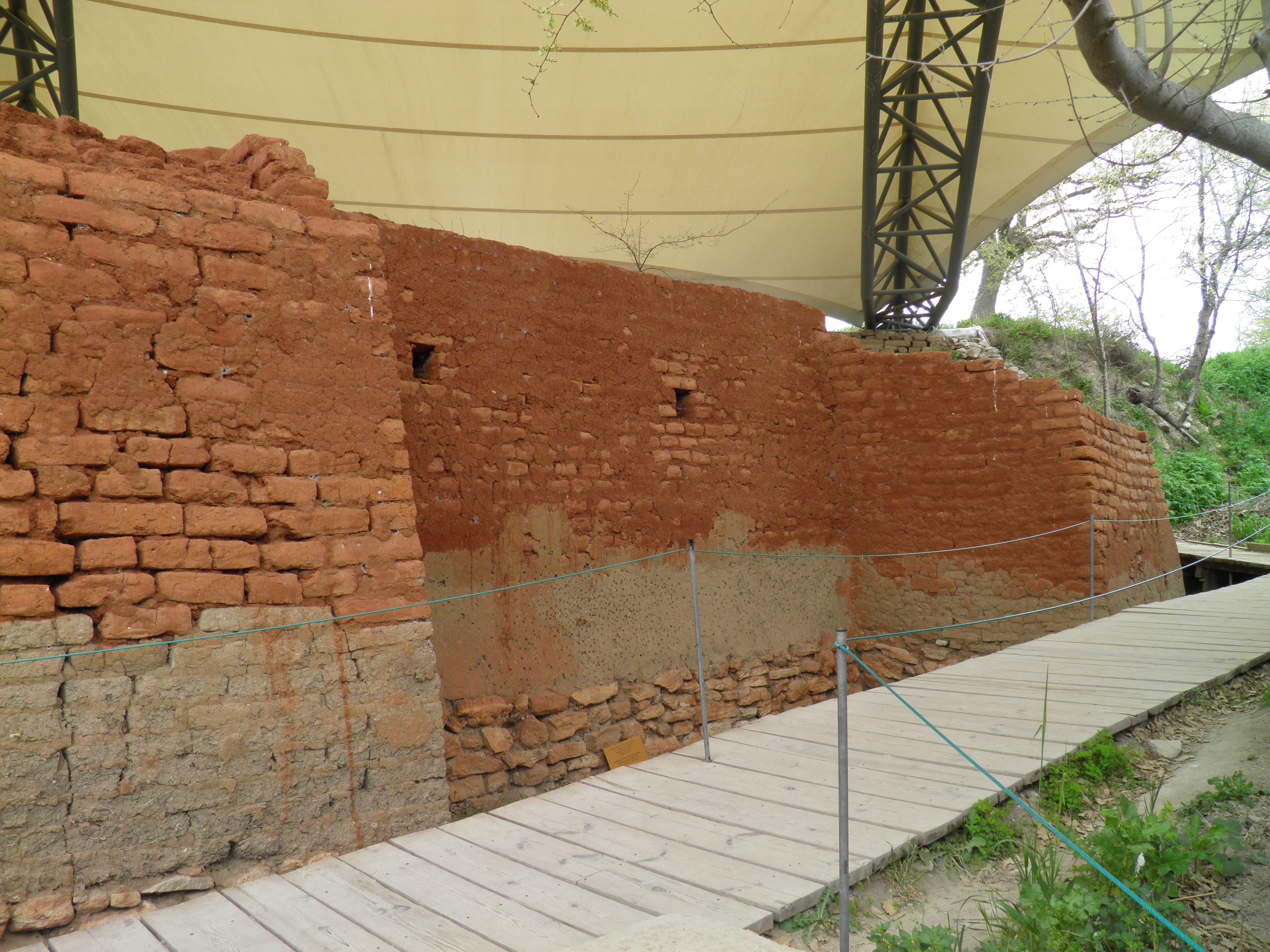
Troy II walls with modern reconstructed mudbrick

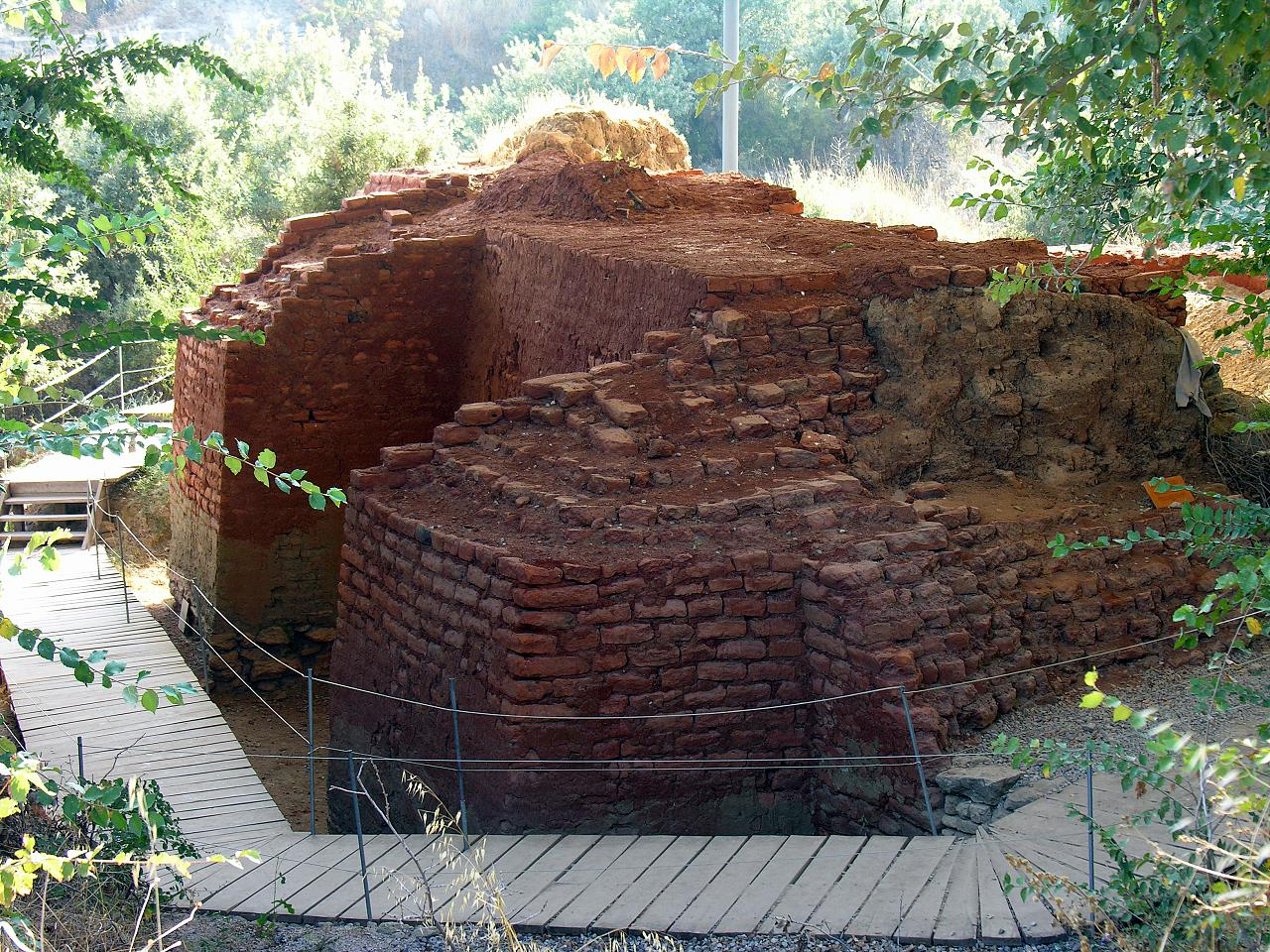
Troy II fortifications with modern reconstructed mudbrick

=== Troy III–V ===
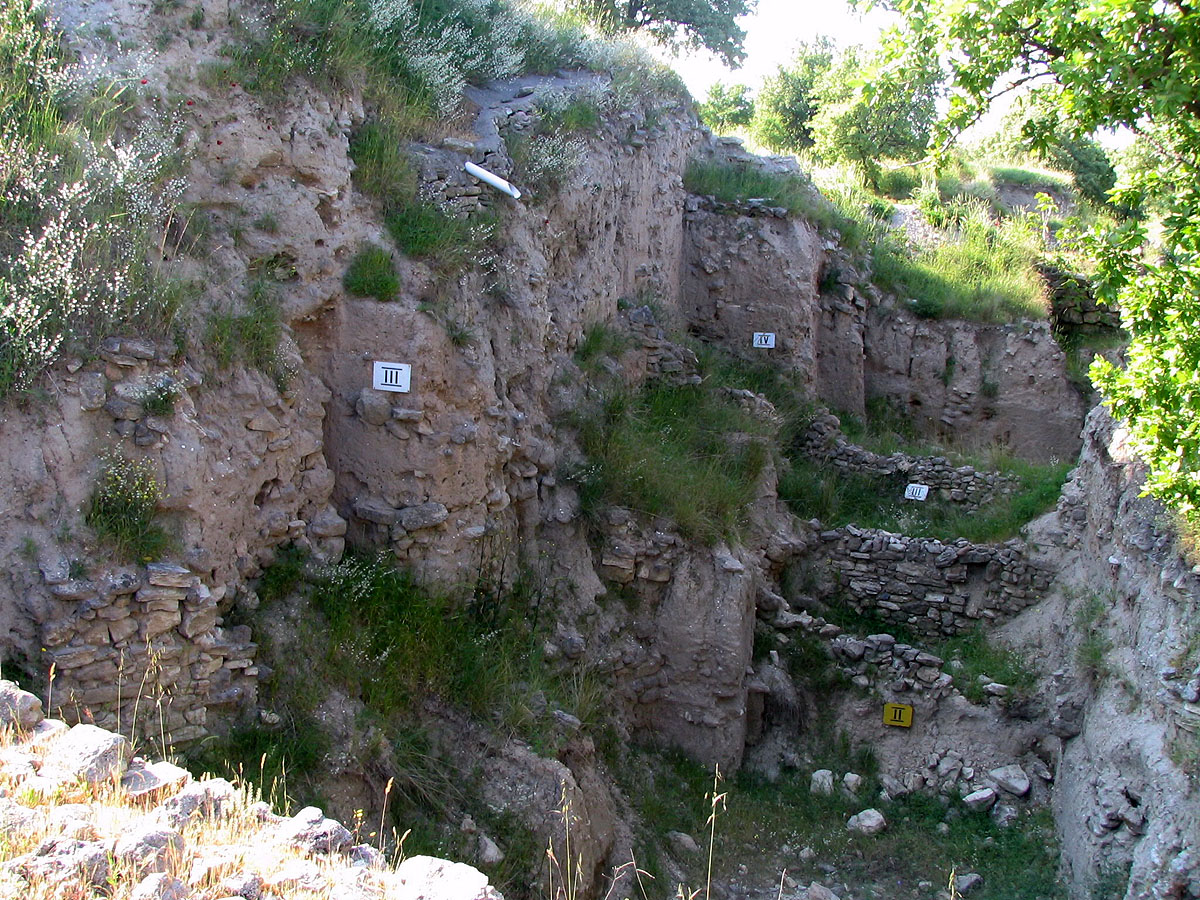
"Schliemann's Trench". Layers are marked with Roman numerals.

Troy continued to be occupied between 2300 BC and 1750 BC. However, little is known about these several layers due to Schliemann's careless excavation practices. In order to fully excavate the citadel of Troy II, he destroyed most remains from this period without first documenting them. These settlements appear to have been smaller and poorer than previous ones, though this interpretation could be merely the result of gaps in the surviving evidence. The settlements included a dense residential neighbourhood in the citadel. Walls from Troy II may have been reused as part of Troy III (c. 2350/2300 to 2200/2150 BC).

==== Middle Bronze Age ====
Troy IV (c. 2000–1820 BC) sees the introduction of domed ovens, and mudbrick was used to construct houses without the use of stone foundations for the first time at Troy.

By the period of Troy V (c. 1820–1750 BC), the city had once again expanded outside the citadel to the west. In Troy V, artefacts include Anatolian-style "red-cross bowls" as well as imported Minoan objects. They would trade with other cities around them. Earthquakes during the 18th century damaged parts of Troy V including the ruined houses.

=== Troy VI–VII ===
Troy VI–VII was a major Late Bronze Age city consisting of a steep fortified citadel and a sprawling lower town below it. It was a thriving coastal city with a considerable population, equal in size to second-tier Hittite settlements. It had a distinct Northwest Anatolian culture and extensive foreign contacts, including with Mycenaean Greece, and its position at the mouth of the Dardanelles has been argued to have given it the function of a regional capital, its status protected by treaties. Aspects of its architecture are consistent with the Iliad's description of mythic Troy, and several of its sublayers (VIh and VIIa) show potential signs of violent destruction. Thus, these sublayers are among the candidates for a potential historical setting of those myths.

Late Bronze Age Troy includes parts of the archaeological layers known as Troy VI and Troy VII. Troy VI was built c. 1750 BC. Its final sublayer, Troy VIh, was destroyed c. 1300 BC. The early sublayers of Troy VII were contemporary with the late period of Mycenaean culture and the Hittite Empire. The later layers were contemporary with the Greek Dark Ages and the Neo-Hittite states.

- Troy VI: c. 1750 – c. 1300 BC
- Troy VII: c. 1300 – c. 950 BC
  - Troy VIIa: c. 1300 – c. 1180 BC
  - Troy VIIb: c. 1180 – c. 950 BC
    - Troy VIIb_{1}: c. 1180 – c. 1100 BC
    - Troy VIIb_{2}: c. 1100 – c. 1050 BC
    - Troy VIIb_{3}: c. 1050 – c. 950 BC

Troy VI and VII were given separate labels by early excavators, but scholarly consensus holds that the first several sublayers of Troy VII were in fact continuations of the earlier city. As a result, some researchers have suggested relabelling Troy VIIa as Troy VIi and Troy VIIb1 as Troy VIj, with Troy VII beginning at the sublayer standardly known as VIIb2. Although the substance of this proposal is widely accepted, the original nomenclature is still generally used to avoid confusion.

==== Troy VI ====
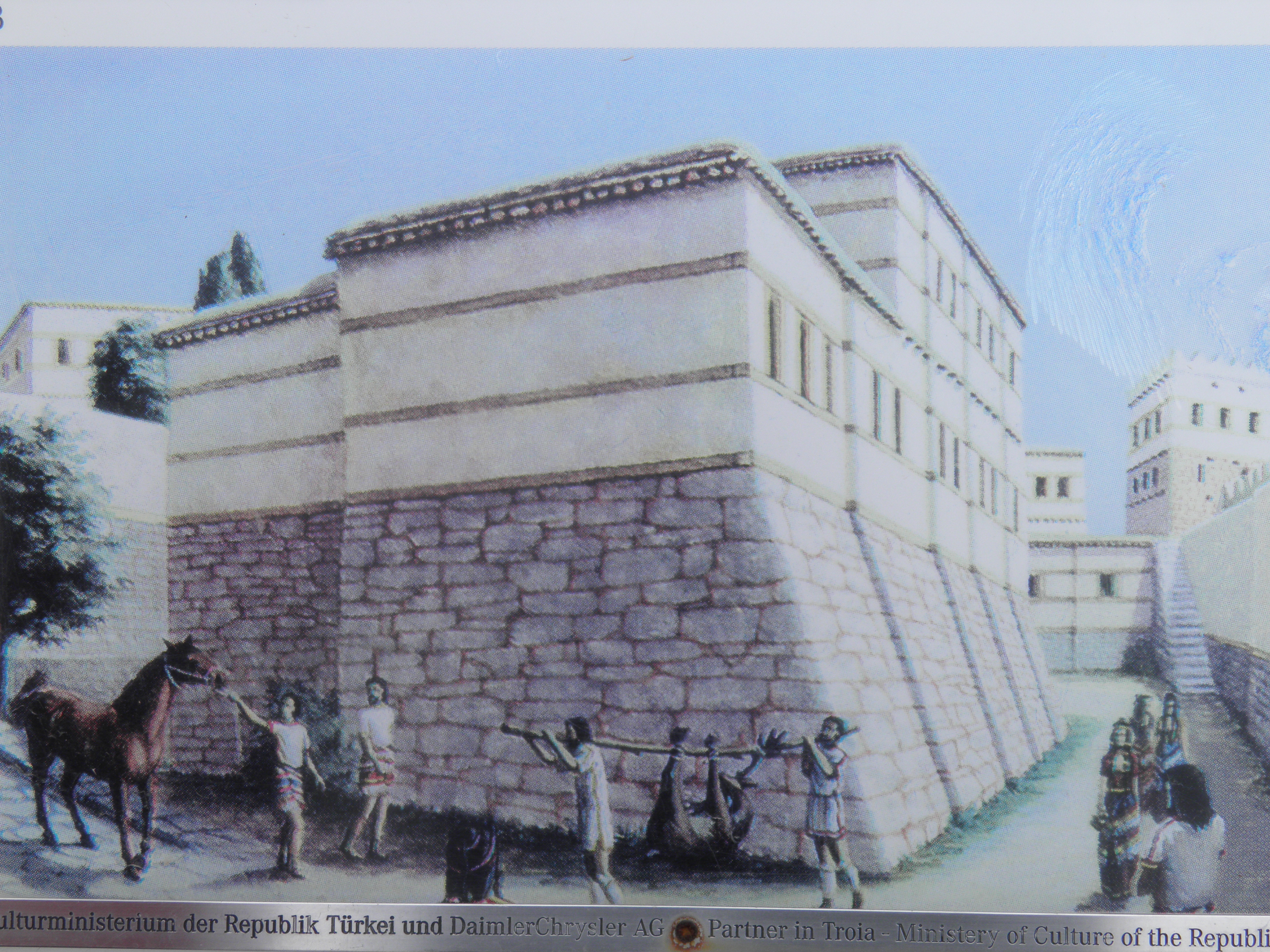
Artist's representation of House VI M, part of the palatial complex

Troy VI existed from around 1750 BC to 1300 BC. Its citadel was divided into a series of rising terraces, of which only the outermost is reasonably well-preserved. On this terrace, archaeologists have found the remains of freestanding multistory houses where Trojan elites would have lived. These houses lacked ground-floor windows, and their stone exterior walls mirrored the architecture of the citadel fortifications. However, they otherwise display an eclectic mix of architectural styles, some following the classic megaron design, others even having irregular floorplans. Some of these houses show potential Aegean influence, one in particular resembling the megaron at Midea in the Argolid. Archaeologists believe there may have been a royal palace on the highest terrace, but most Bronze Age remains from the top of the hill were cleared away by classical era building projects.

The citadel was enclosed by a massive wall whose limestone base is visible to modern day visitors. These walls were periodically renovated, expanding from an initial width of 1.2 to 5 metres (3.9 to 16.4 ft) around 1400 BC. During the Bronze Age they would have been overlaid with wood and mudbrick superstructures, reaching a height over 9 metres (30 ft). The walls were built in a "sawtooth" style made of 7–10 metres (23–33 ft) segments which joined at shallow angles. This characteristic is common in the walls of Mycenaean citadels, though at Troy it is also found in other buildings, suggesting that it may have been decorative. The walls also have a notable slope, similar to those at other sites including Hattusa. However, the walls differ from contemporary Aegean and Anatolian sites both in their lack of figural sculpture and in their masonry. While Troy VI's walls were made entirely of close-fitting ashlars, contemporary sites typically used ashlars around a rubble core.

Troy VI's walls were overlooked by several rectangular watchtowers, which would also have provided a clear view of Trojan plain and the sea beyond it. The citadel was accessed by five gates, which led into paved and drained cobblestone streets. Some of these gates featured enormous pillars which serve no structural purpose and have been interpreted as religious symbols. The halls were built in megaron style, resembling Mycenaean architecture.

The lower town was built to the south of the citadel, covering an area of roughly 30 hectares. Remains of a dense neighbourhood have been found just outside the citadel walls, and traces of Bronze Age occupation have been found further away. These include huts, stone paving, threshing floors, pithoi, and waste left behind by Bronze Age industry such as murex shells associated with the manufacture of purple dye. The extent of the lower town is evidenced by a defensive ditch cut 1-2 into the bedrock. A wall or palisade may have stood several meters behind the ditch, as in the outer defences of other cities such as Qadesh and Carchemish. However, material evidence for such a wall is limited to postholes and cuts in the bedrock.

The lower city was only discovered in the late 1980s, earlier excavators having assumed that Troy VI occupied only the hill of Hisarlık. Its discovery led to a dramatic reassessment of Troy VI, showing that it was over 16 times larger than had been assumed, and thus a major city with a large population rather than a mere aristocratic residence. However, only 2–3% of the lower city had been excavated as of 2013, and few architectural features are likely to exist. Almost 2 m of the surface has eroded, likely removing much of the evidence that had not already decomposed, been built over, or reused in later construction.

The material culture of Troy VI appears to belong to a distinct Northwest Anatolian cultural group, with influences from the Aegean and the Balkans. The primary local pottery styles were wheel-made Tan Ware and Anatolian Gray Ware. Both styles were offshoots of an earlier Middle Helladic tradition related to Minyan Ware. The earliest grey ware at Troy was made in Aegean shapes, though by 1700 BC it had been replaced by Anatolian shapes. Foreign pottery found at the site includes Minoan, Mycenaean, Cypriot, and Levantine items. Local potters also made their own imitations of foreign styles, including Gray Ware and Tan Ware pots made in Mycenaean-style shapes, particularly after 1500 BC. Although the city appears to have been within the Hittite sphere of influence, no Hittite artefacts have been found in Troy VI. Also notably absent are sculptures and wall paintings, otherwise common features of Bronze Age cities. Troy VI is also notable for its architectural innovations as well as its cultural developments, which included the first evidence of horses at the site.

The language spoken in Troy VI is unknown. One candidate is Luwian, an Anatolian language believed to have been spoken in the general area. Potential evidence comes from a biconvex seal inscribed with the name of a person using Anatolian hieroglyphs often used to write Luwian. However, available evidence is not sufficient to establish that Luwian was actually spoken by the city's population, and a number of alternatives, such as Greek and Lemnian-Etruscan, have been proposed. Hittite documents found at Hattusa suggest that literacy existed at Troy and that the city may have had a written archive. The Alaksandu Treaty required King Alaksandu to read its text publicly three times a year, while the Milawata letter mentions that the deposed King Walmu was still in possession of wooden investiture tablets. The archive would likely have been housed in the citadel's innermost precinct, whose remains were pushed over the northern side of the hill during 3rd century construction. Despite attempts to sift through the rubble, no documents have been found.

Troy VI was destroyed around 1300 BC, corresponding with the sublayer known as Troy VIh. Damage in the Troy VIh layer includes extensive collapsed masonry and subsidence in the southeast of the citadel, indicative of an earthquake. Alternative hypotheses include an internal uprising as well as a foreign attack, though the city was not burned and no victims were found in the debris.

Troy VI–VII citadel walls
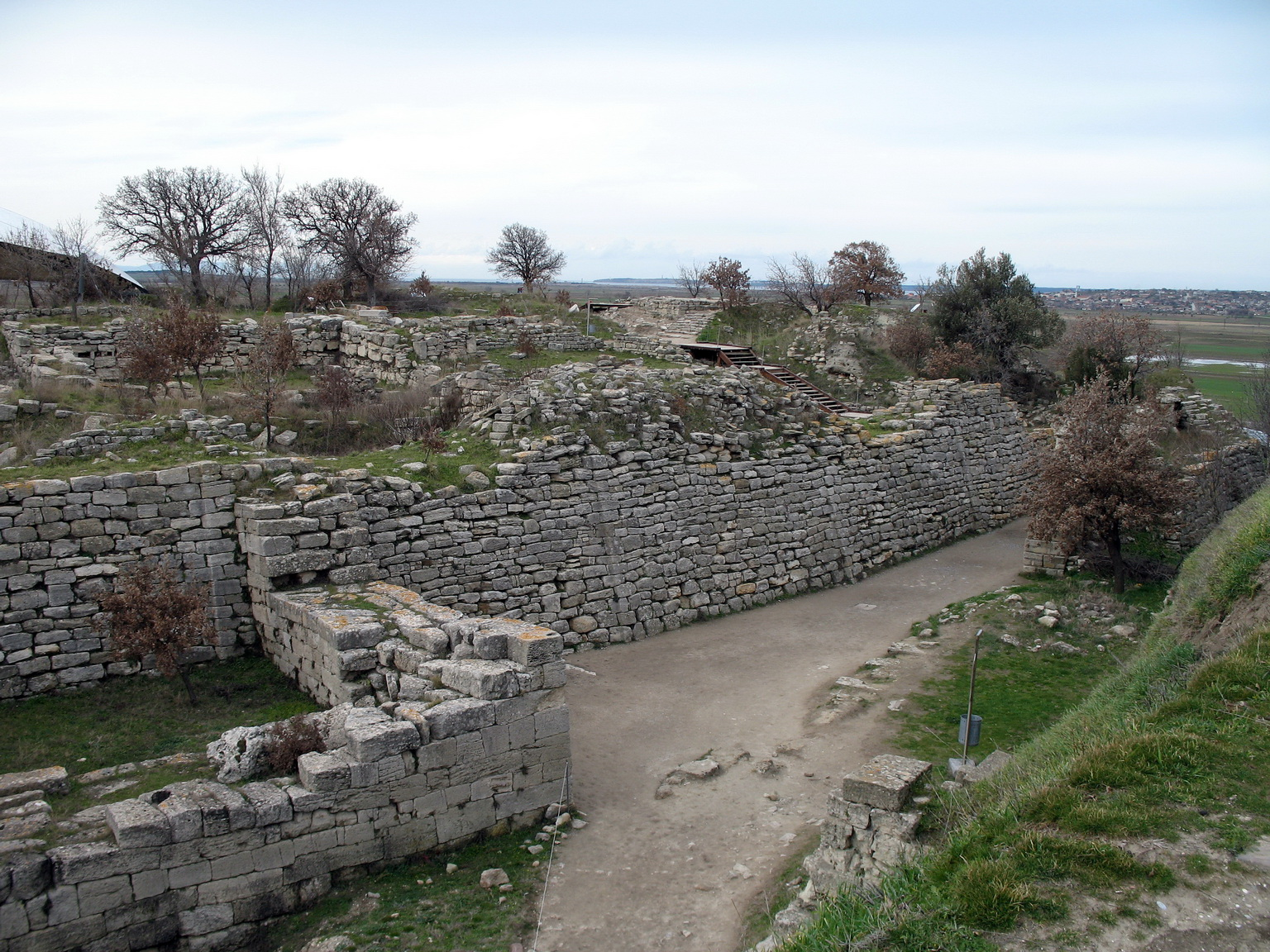
Troy VI East Gate and Troy VI houses on the terrace immediately above

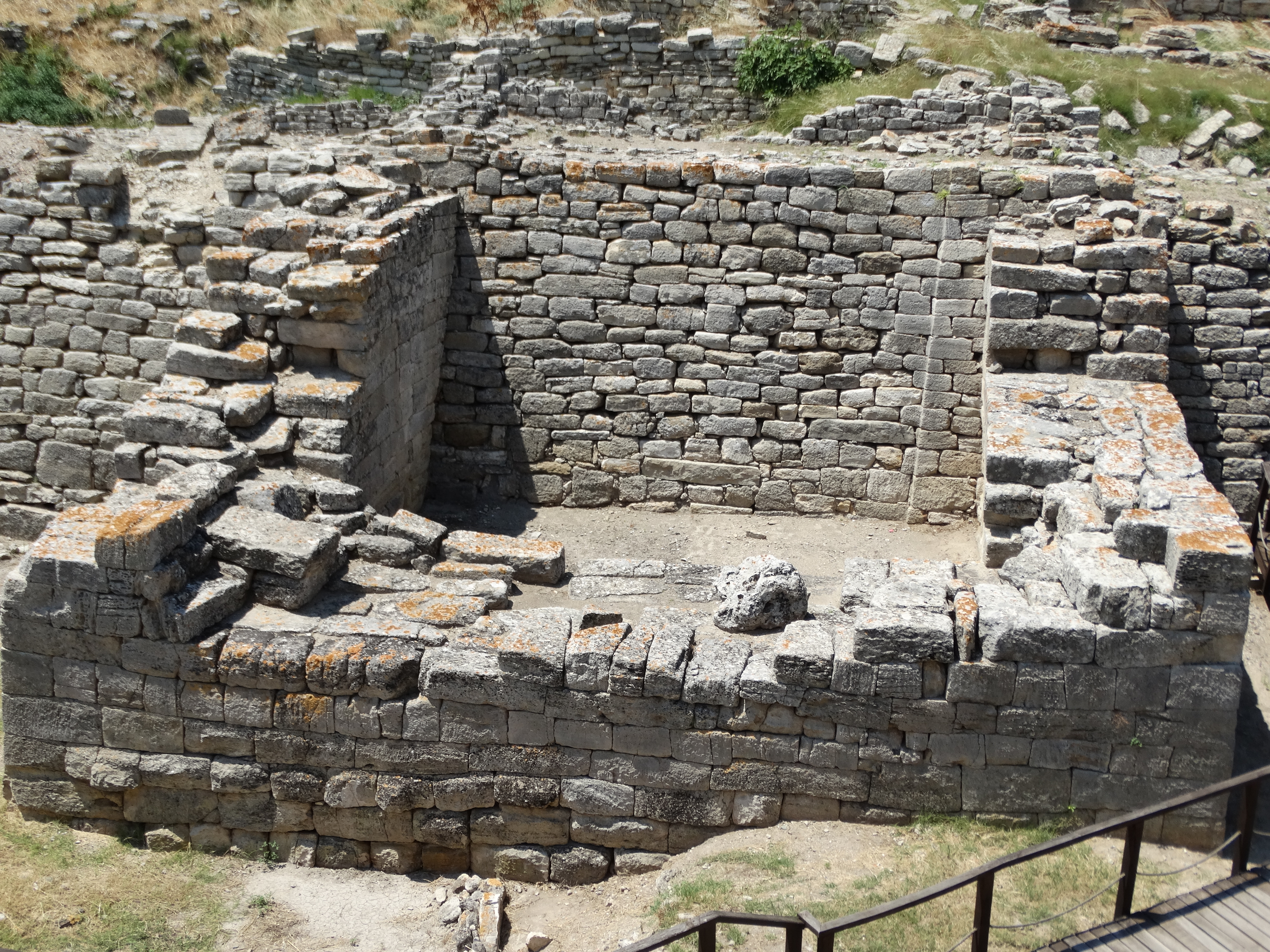
Tower at the East Gate Complex

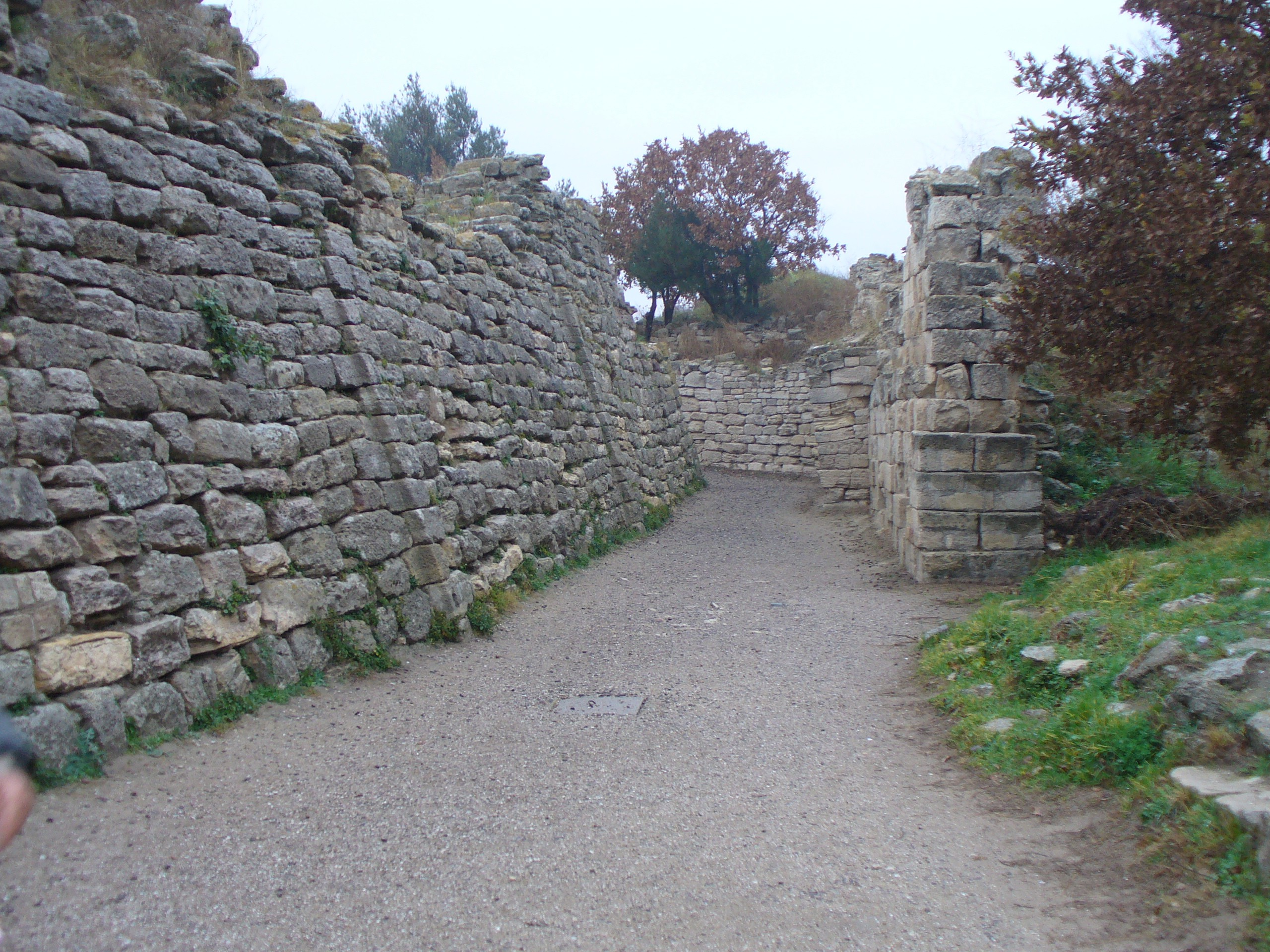
East Gate cul de sac (Troy IX walls on the right)

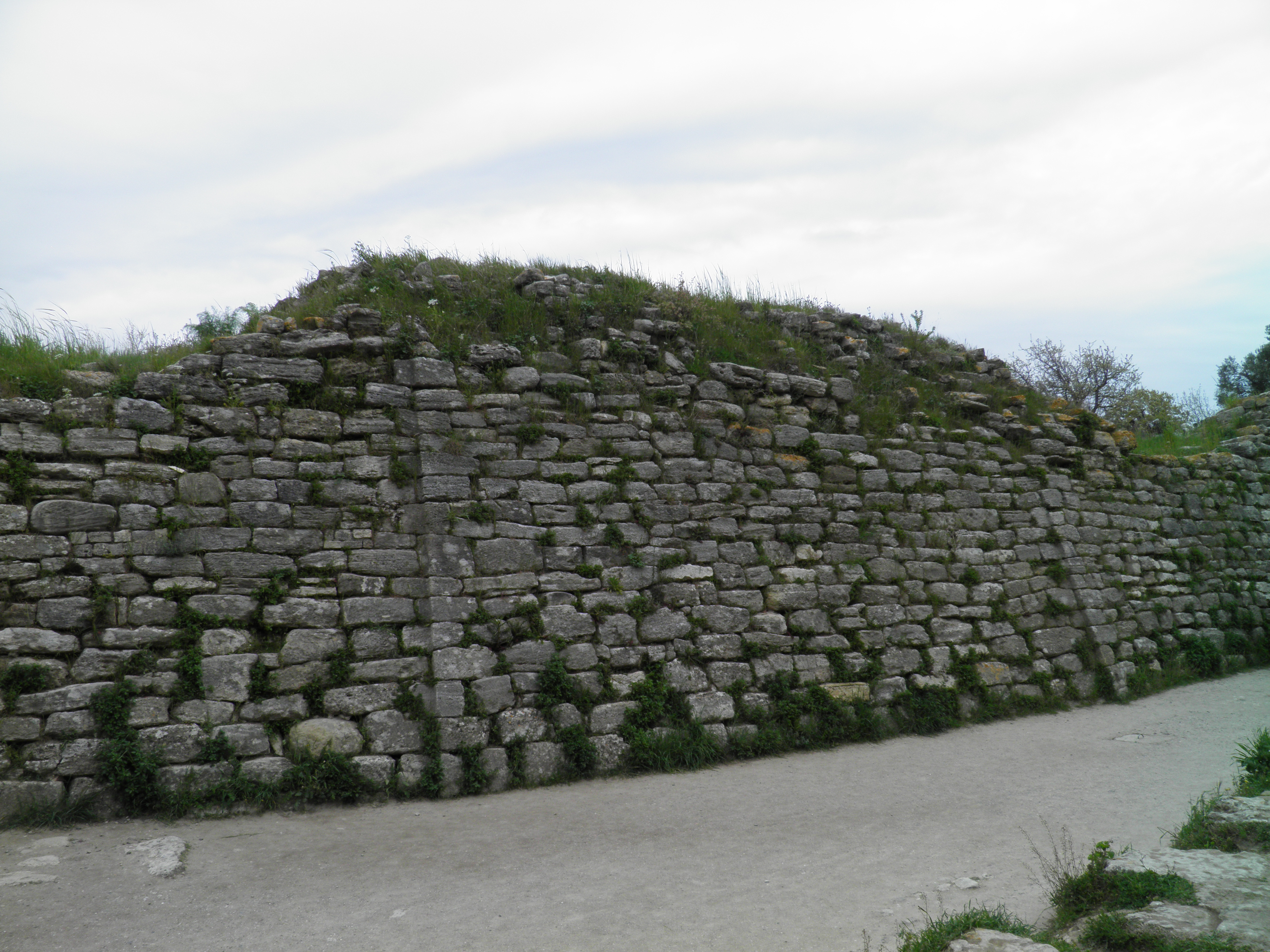
Wall segment near the East Gate

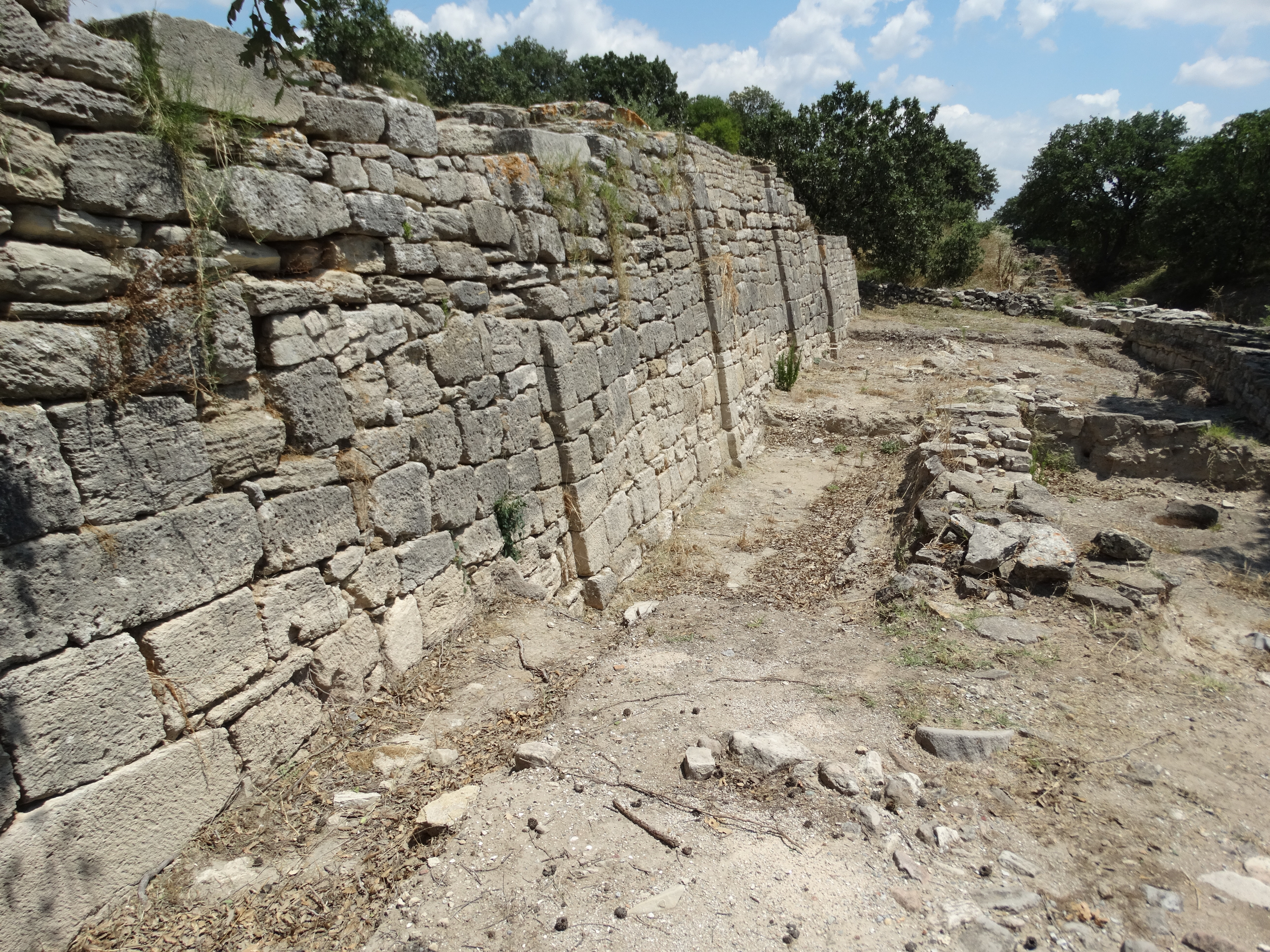
Side view of wall

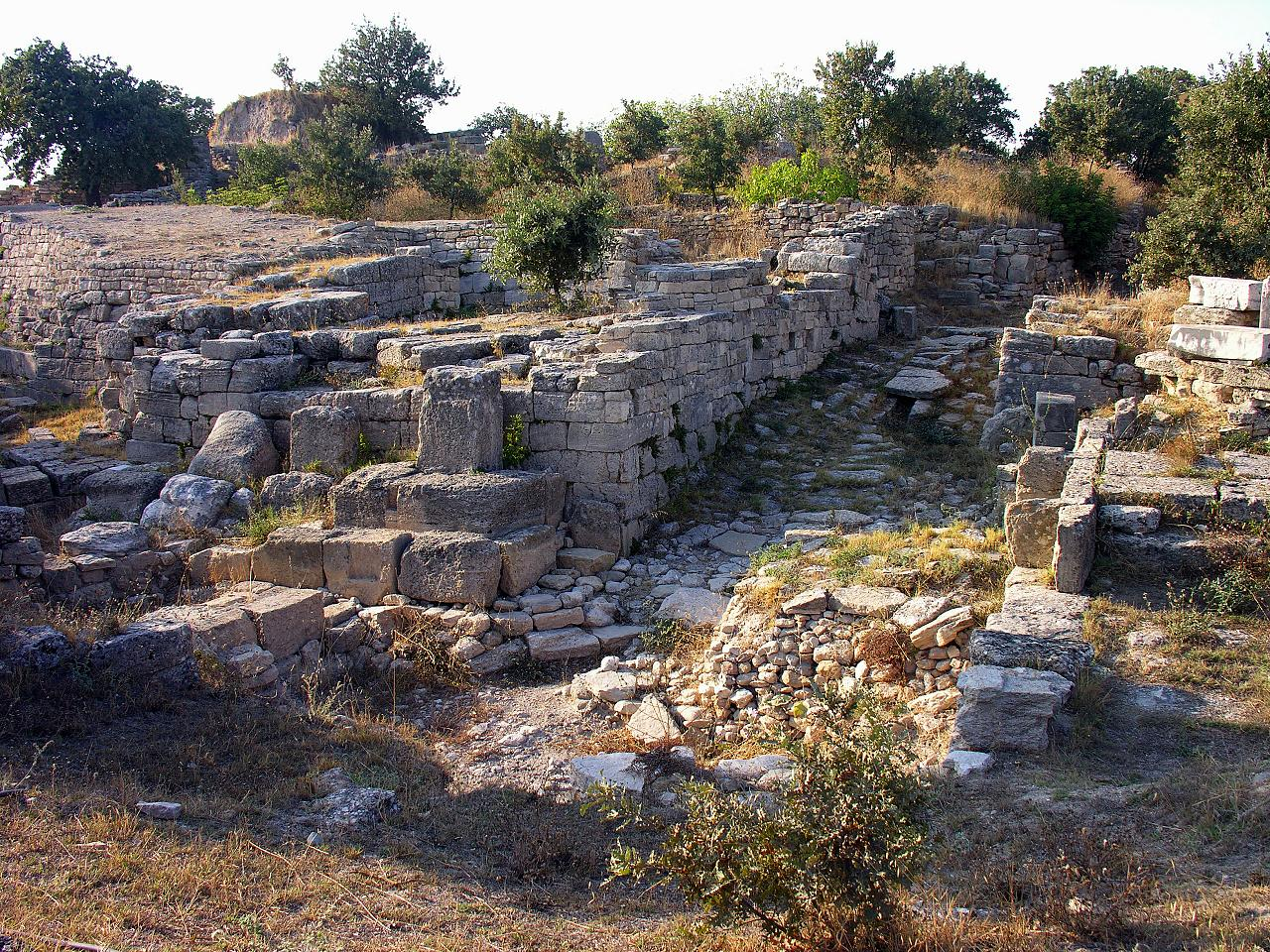
South Gate

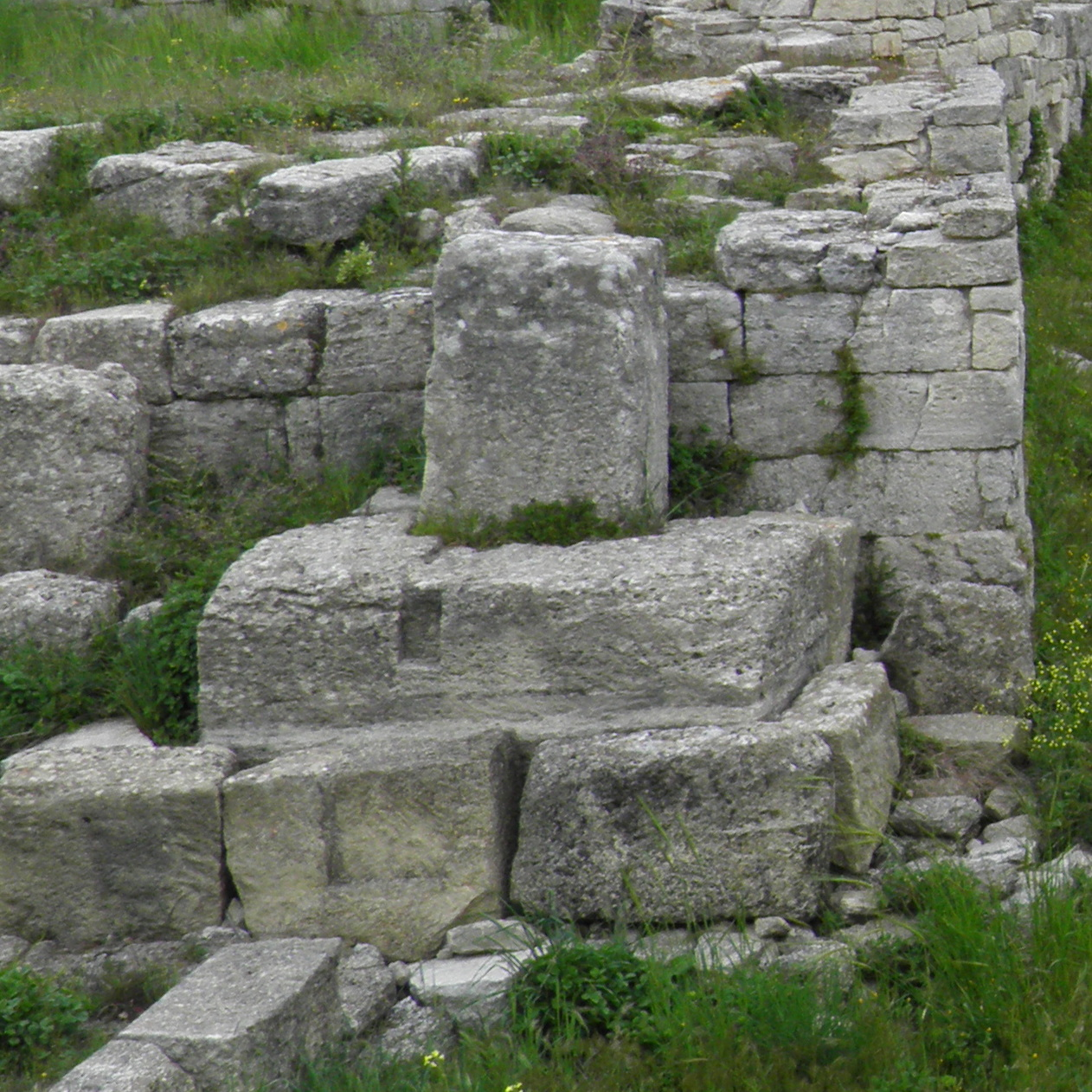
Non-structural pillar at the South Gate

==== Troy VIIa ====
Troy VIIa was the final layer of the Late Bronze Age city. It was built soon after the destruction of Troy VI, seemingly by its previous inhabitants. The builders reused many of the earlier city's surviving structures, notably its citadel wall, which they renovated with additional stone towers and mudbrick breastworks. Numerous small houses were added inside the citadel, filling in formerly open areas. New houses were also built in the lower city, whose area appears to have been greater in Troy VIIa than in Troy VI. In many of these houses, archaeologists found enormous storage jars called pithoi buried in the ground. Troy VIIa seems to have been built by survivors of Troy VI's destruction, as evidenced by continuity in material culture. However, the character of the city appears to have changed, the citadel growing crowded and foreign imports declining.

The city was destroyed around 1180 BC, roughly contemporary with the Late Bronze Age collapse but subsequent to the destruction of the Mycenaean palaces. The destruction layer shows evidence of enemy attack, including scorch marks.

==== Troy VIIb ====
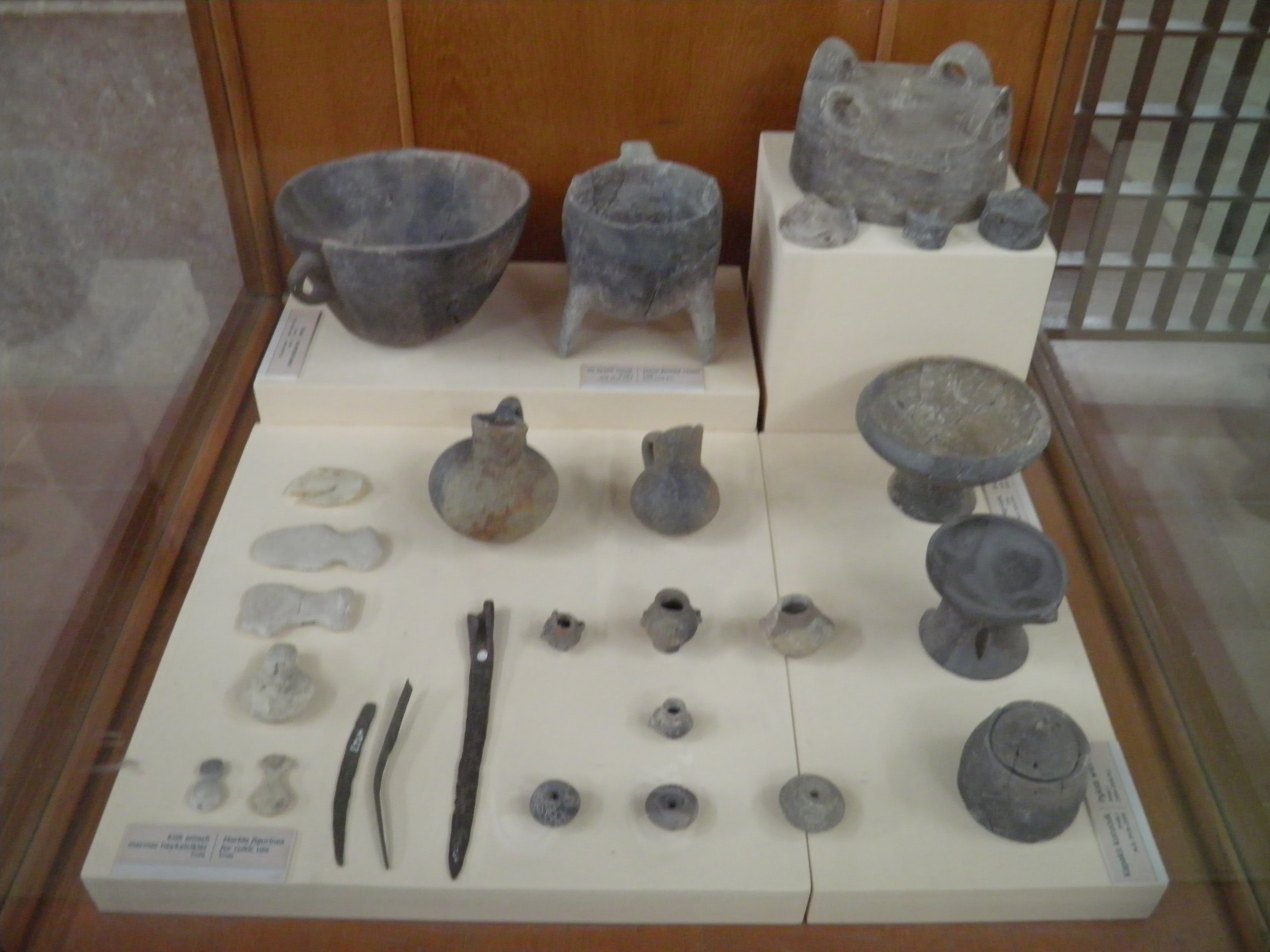
Anatolian Grey Ware

After the destruction of Troy VIIa around 1180 BC, the city was rebuilt as Troy VIIb. Older structures were again reused, including Troy VI's citadel walls. Its first phase, Troy VIIb1, appears to be largely a continuation of Troy VIIa. Residents continued using wheel-made Grey Ware pottery alongside a new handmade style sometimes known as "barbarian ware". Imported Mycenaean-style pottery attests to some continuing foreign trade. However, the city's population appears to have dropped, and rebuilding seems to be confined to the citadel.

One of the most striking finds from Troy VIIb1 is a bronze biconvex hieroglyphic Luwian seal giving the name of a woman on one side and the name of a man who worked as a scribe on the other. The seal is important since it is the only example of preclassical writing found at the site, and provides potential evidence that Troy VIIb1 had a Luwian-speaking population. However, the find is puzzling since palace bureaucracies had largely disappeared by this era. Proposed explanations include the possibility that it belonged to an itinerant freelance scribe and alternatively that it dates from an earlier era than its find context would suggest.

Troy VIIb2 is marked by dramatic cultural changes including walls made of upright stones and a handmade knobbed pottery style known as Buckelkeramik. These practices, which existed alongside older local traditions, have been argued to reflect immigrant populations arriving from southwest Europe. These newcomers may have shared an origin with the Phrygians who initiated similar cultural shifts at sites such as Gordion. This layer was destroyed around 1050 BC after an apparent earthquake.

Troy VIIb3 dates from the Protogeometric era. No new builds were constructed, so its existence is known primarily from artefacts found in the West Sanctuary and terraces on south side of mound. These areas were excavated in the 1990s, surprising the archaeologists who had assumed that the site was abandoned until the Archaic Era. Locally made neck-handled amphoras shows that Troy still had a pottery industry, possibly associated with a wine or oil industry. The style of these pots shows stylistic similarities to other North Aegean sites, suggesting cultural contact. (Because other artefacts do not show these links, archaeologists believe that Greek settlement of Troy did not begin until later.) Both the Troy VI walls and the Troy VIIa Terrace House were reused for worship and communal feasting, as evidenced by animal bones, pottery assemblages, and traces of burned incense. Strikingly, the Terrace House was not renovated when it was adopted as a cult centre and thus must have been used in a ruined state, potentially suggesting that the occupants of Troy VIIb3 were deliberately re-engaging with their past.

Troy VIIb was destroyed by fire around 950 BC. However, some houses in the citadel were left intact and the site continued to be occupied, if only sparsely.

=== Troy VIII–IX ===
Troy VIII was founded during the Greek Dark Ages and lasted until the Roman era. Though the site had never been entirely abandoned, its redevelopment as a major city was spurred by Greek immigrants who began building around 700 BC. During the Archaic period, the city's defences once again included the reused citadel wall of Troy VI. Later on, the walls became tourist attractions and sites of worship. Other remains of the Bronze Age city were destroyed by the Greeks' building projects, notably the peak of the citadel where the Troy VI palace is likely to have stood. By the classical era, the city had numerous temples, a theatre, among other public buildings, and was once again expanding to the south of the citadel. Troy VIII was destroyed in 85 BC, and subsequently rebuilt as Troy IX. A series of earthquakes devastated the city around 500 AD, though finds from the Late Byzantine era attest to continued habitation at a small scale.

Troy VIII–IX
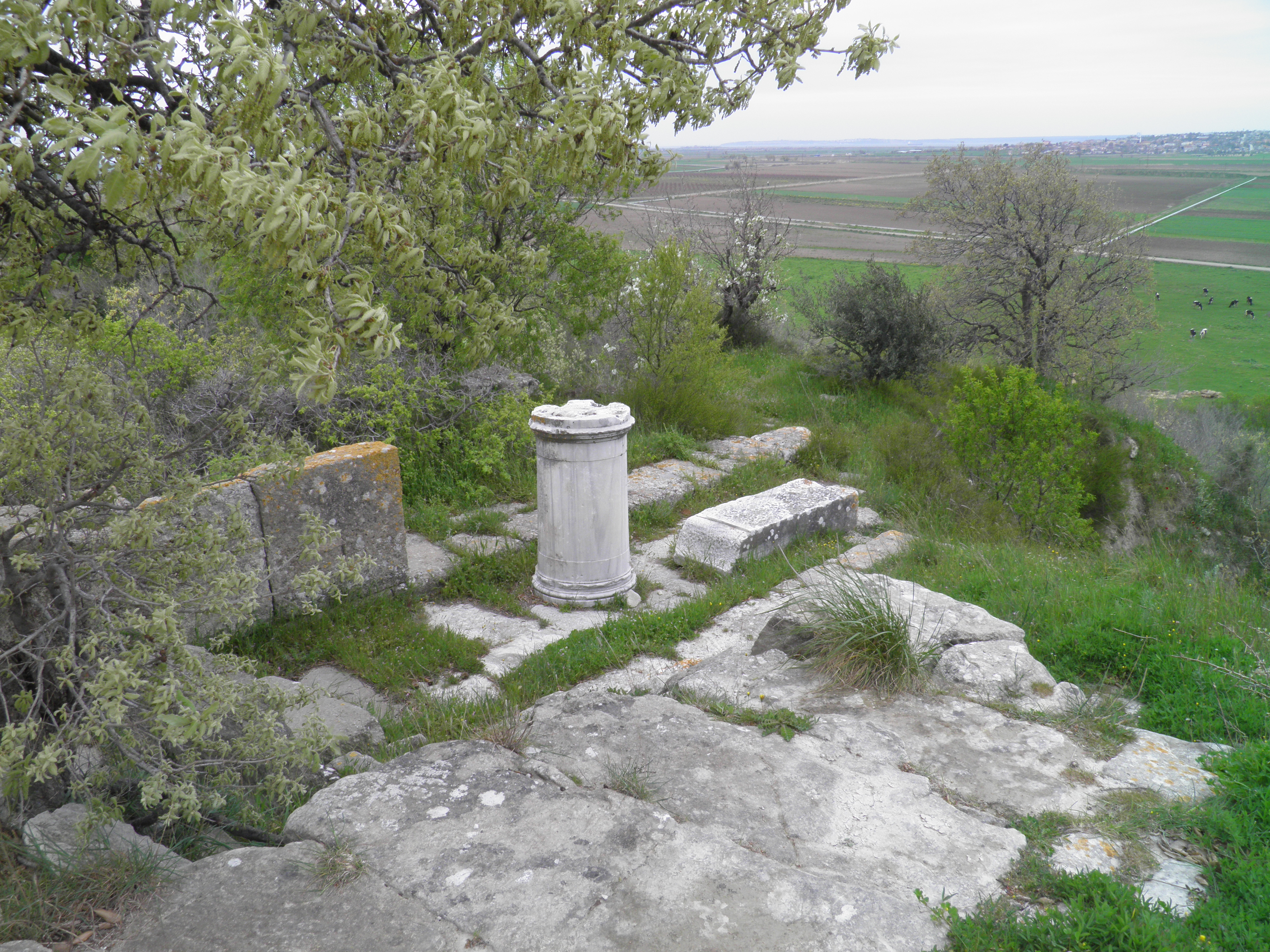
Troy VIII Temple of Athena, built over the ruins of the Bronze Age palatial complex

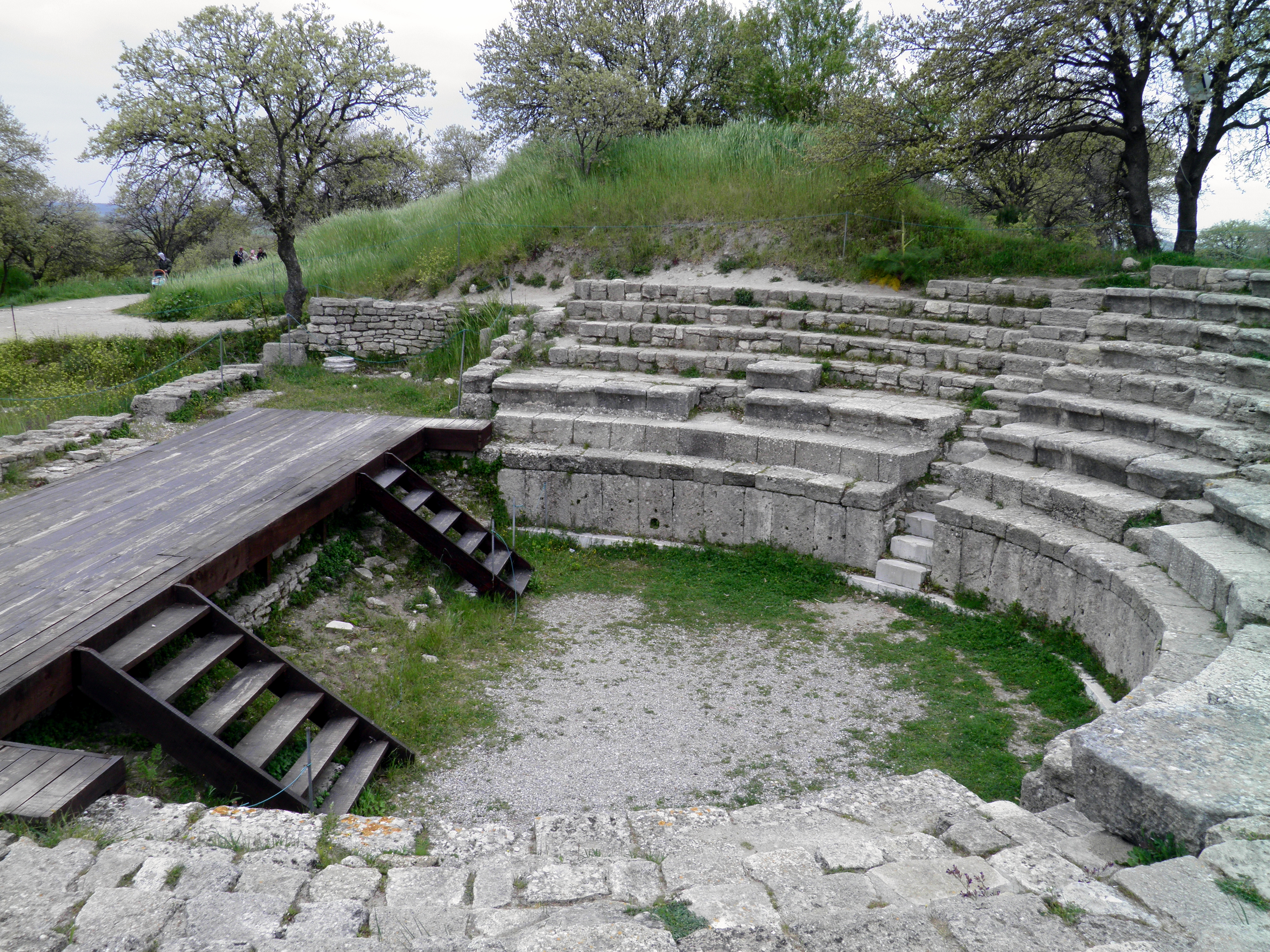
Troy IX Odeon

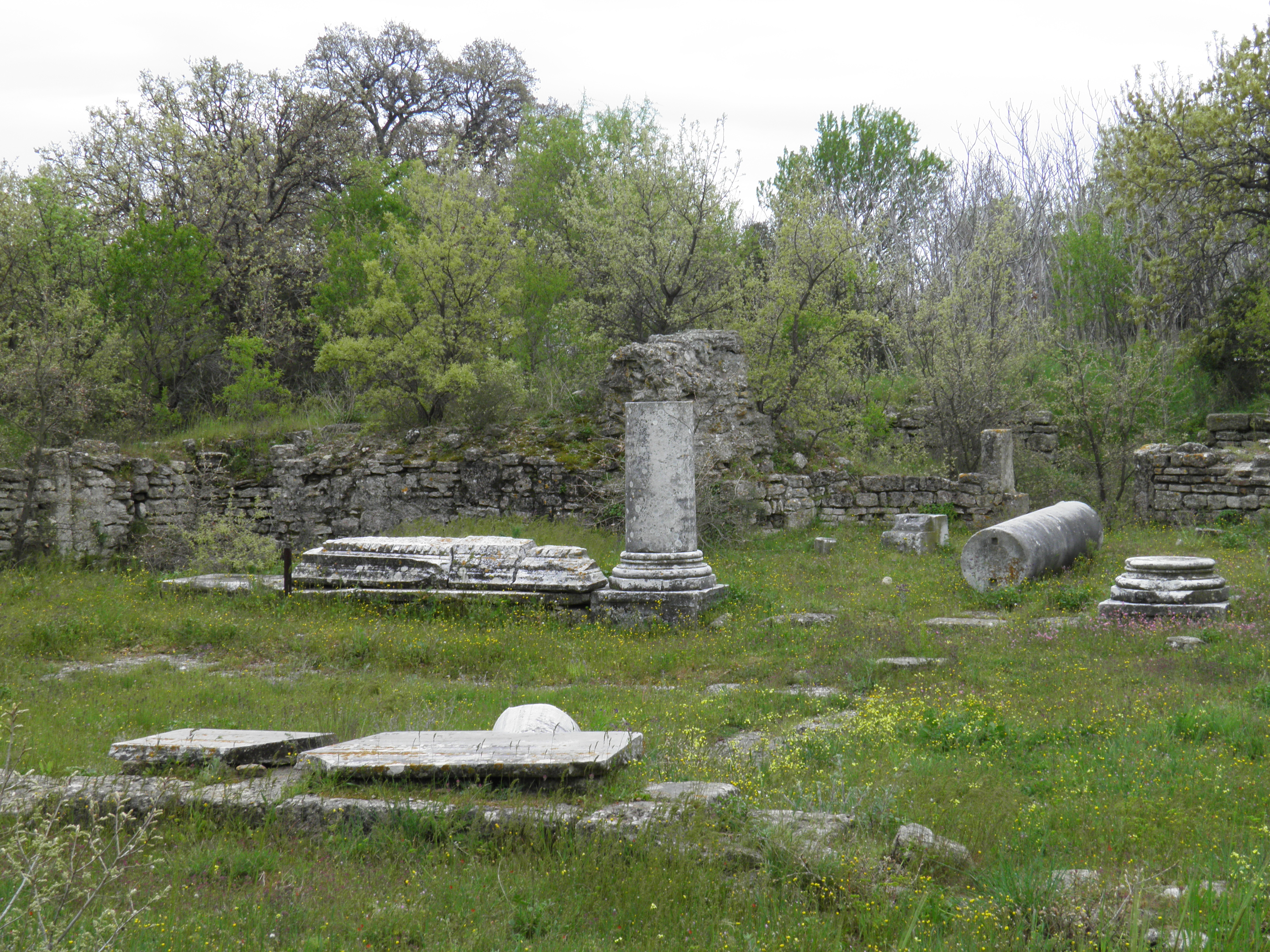
Troy IX Roman bath

== Historical Troy ==
Mycenaean and Mycenaeanizing features in western Anatolia, c. 1400–1200 BC. At Troy, approximately 1,000 Mycenaean pottery sherds, representing an estimated 700–800 vessels, have been recovered. The nearby cemetery at Beşik Tepe, associated with Troy, also contained Mycenaean pottery and a chamber tomb.

Troy I–V predate writing and thus are known entirely from their archaeological remains. However, written records about the city appear starting with the Late Bronze Age Troy VI and continuing into the Greek and Roman era Troy VIII-IX.

=== Troy VI–VII in Hittite records ===
Troy VI–VII is believed to be the city referred to as Wilusa and Taruisa in Hittite records. These correspondences were first proposed in 1924 by E. Forrer on the basis of linguistic similarities, since "Taruisa" is a plausible correspondent of the Greek name "Troia" and "Wilusa" likewise for the Greek "Wilios" (later "Ilion"). Subsequent research on Hittite geography has made these identifications more secure, though not all scholars regard them as firmly established. Texts concerning Wilusa are of particular relevance to later legends since they suggest that Wilusa was within the sphere of influence of Mycenaean Greece, which the Hittites referred to as Ahhiyawa.

Wilusa first appears in Hittite records around 1400 BC, when it was one of the twenty-two states of the Assuwa Confederation which unsuccessfully attempted to oppose the Hittite Empire. Circumstantial evidence raises the possibility that the rebellion was supported by the Ahhiyawa. By the late 1300s BC, Wilusa had become politically aligned with the Hittites. Texts from this period mention two kings named Kukkunni and Alaksandu who maintained peaceful relations with the Hittites even as other states in the area did not. Wilusan soldiers may have served in the Hittite army during the Battle of Kadesh. A bit later, Wilusa seems to have experienced the political turmoil suffered by many of its neighbours. References in the Manapa-Tarhunta letter and Tawagalawa letter suggest that a Wilusan king either rebelled or was deposed. This turmoil may have been related to the exploits of Piyamaradu, a Western Anatolian warlord who toppled other pro-Hittite rulers while acting on behalf of the Ahhiyawa. However, Piyamaradu is never explicitly identified as the culprit and certain features of the text suggest that he was not. The final reference to Wilusa in the historical record appears in the Milawata letter, in which the Hittite king Tudhaliya IV expresses his intention to reinstall a deposed Wilusan king named Walmu.

In popular writing, these anecdotes have been interpreted as evidence for a historical kernel in myths of the Trojan War. However, scholars have not found historical evidence for any particular event from the legends, and the Hittite documents do not suggest that Wilusa-Troy was ever attacked by Greeks-Ahhiyawa themselves. Noted Hittiteologist Trevor Bryce cautions that our current understanding of Wilusa's history does not provide evidence for there having been an actual Trojan War since "the less material one has, the more easily it can be manipulated to fit whatever conclusion one wishes to come up with".

=== Classical and Hellenistic Troy (Troy VIII) ===
According to Herodotus, the Persian king Xerxes sacrificed 1,000 cattle at the sanctuary of Athena Ilias while marching towards Greece. Following the Persian defeat in 480–479 BC, Ilion and its territory became part of the continental possessions of Mytilene and remained under Mytilenaean control until the unsuccessful Mytilenean revolt in 428–427. Athens liberated the so-called Actaean cities (called 'Actaean' cities because they were located on the ἀκτή (aktē) or promontory of the mainland north of Lesbos.) including Ilion and enrolled these communities in the Delian League. Athenian influence in the Hellespont waned following the oligarchic coup of 411, and in that year the Spartan general Mindaros emulated Xerxes by likewise sacrificing to Athena Ilias. From c. 410–399, Ilion was within the sphere of influence of the local dynasts at Lampsacus (Zenis, his wife Mania, and the usurper Meidias) who administered the region on behalf of the Persian satrap Pharnabazus.

In 399, the Spartan general Dercylidas expelled the Greek garrison at Ilion who were controlling the city on behalf of the Lampsacene dynasts during a campaign which rolled back Persian influence throughout the Troad. Ilion remained outside the control of the Persian satrapal administration at Dascylium until the Peace of Antalcidas in 387–386. In this period of renewed Persian control c. 387–367, a statue of Ariobarzanes, the satrap of Hellespontine Phrygia, was erected in front of the temple of Athena Ilias. In 360–359 the city was briefly controlled by Charidemus of Oreus, an Euboean mercenary leader who occasionally worked for the Athenians. In 359, he was expelled by the Athenian Menelaos son of Arrabaios, whom the Ilians honoured with a grant of proxeny—this is recorded in the earliest civic decree to survive from Ilion. In May 334 Alexander the Great crossed the Hellespont and came to the city, where he visited the temple of Athena Ilias, made sacrifices at the tombs of the Homeric heroes, and made the city free and exempt from taxes. According to the so-called 'Last Plans' of Alexander which became known after his death in June 323, he had planned to rebuild the temple of Athena Ilias on a scale that would have surpassed every other temple in the known world.

Antigonus Monophthalmus took control of the Troad in 311 and created the new city of Antigoneia Troas which was a synoikism of the cities of Skepsis, Kebren, Neandreia, Hamaxitos, Larisa, and Kolonai. In c. 311–306 the koinon of Athena Ilias was founded from the remaining cities in the Troad and along the Asian coast of the Dardanelles and soon after succeeded in securing a guarantee from Antigonus that he would respect their autonomy and freedom (he had not respected the autonomy of the cities which were synoikised to create Antigoneia). The koinon continued to function until at least the 1st century AD and primarily consisted of cities from the Troad, although for a time in the second half of the 3rd century it also included Myrlea and Chalcedon from the eastern Propontis. The governing body of the koinon was the synedrion on which each city was represented by two delegates. The day-to-day running of the synedrion, especially in relation to its finances, was left to a college of five agonothetai, on which no city ever had more than one representative. This system of equal (rather than proportional) representation ensured that no one city could politically dominate the koinon. The primary purpose of the koinon was to organise the annual Panathenaia festival which was held at the sanctuary of Athena Ilias. The festival brought huge numbers of pilgrims to Ilion for the duration of the festival as well as creating an enormous market (the panegyris) which attracted traders from across the region. In addition, the koinon financed new building projects at Ilion, for example a new theatre c. 306 and the expansion of the sanctuary and temple of Athena Ilias in the 3rd century, in order to make the city a suitable venue for such a large festival.

In the period 302–281, Ilion and the Troad were part of the kingdom of Lysimachus, who during this time helped Ilion synoikise several nearby communities, thus expanding the city's population and territory. (Note: In a description of the region, Strabo reports that "[Lysimachus] adds to this circle the cities of antiquity already destroyed". [Λυσίμαχος] συνῴκισέ τε εἰς αὐτὴν τὰς κύκλῳ πόλεις ἀρχαίας ἤδη κεκακωμένας. These probably included Birytis, Gentinos, and Sigeion. Birytis and Gentinos are not securely located, but recent excavations at Sigeion appear to independently confirm Strabo's account by indicating an abandonment date soon after c. 300. This may have been punishment for Sigeion resisting Lysimachus in 302.) Lysimachus was defeated at the Battle of Corupedium in February 281 by Seleucus I Nikator, thus handing the Seleucid kingdom control of Asia Minor, and in August or September 281 when Seleucus passed through the Troad on his way to Lysimachia in the nearby Thracian Chersonese Ilion passed a decree in honour of him, indicating the city's new loyalties. In September Seleucus was assassinated at Lysimachia by Ptolemy Keraunos, making his successor, Antiochus I Soter, the new king. In 280 or soon after Ilion passed a long decree lavishly honouring Antiochus in order to cement their relationship with him. (Note: A minority of scholars instead attempt to date this inscription to the reign of Antiochus III (222–187 BC).) During this period Ilion still lacked proper city walls except for the crumbling Troy VI fortifications around the citadel, and in 278 during the Gallic invasion the city was easily sacked. Ilion enjoyed a close relationship with Antiochus for the rest of his reign: for example, in 274 Antiochus granted land to his friend Aristodikides of Assos which for tax purposes was to be attached to the territory of Ilion, and c. 275–269 Ilion passed a decree in honour of Metrodoros of Amphipolis who had successfully treated the king for a wound he received in battle.

=== Roman Troy (Troy IX) ===
The city was destroyed by Sulla's rival, the Roman general Fimbria, in 85 BC following an eleven-day siege. Later that year when Sulla had defeated Fimbria, he bestowed benefactions on Ilion for its loyalty which helped rebuilding the city. Ilion reciprocated this act of generosity by instituting a new civic calendar which took 85 BC as its first year. However, the city remained in financial distress for several decades despite its favoured status with Rome. In the 80s BC, Roman publicani illegally levied taxes on the sacred estates of Athena Ilias, and the city was required to call on Lucius Julius Caesar for restitution; while in 80 BC, the city suffered an attack by pirates. In 77 BC the costs of running the annual festival of the koinon of Athena Ilias became too pressing for both Ilion and the other members of the koinon and L. Julius Caesar was once again required to arbitrate, this time reforming the festival so that it would be less of a financial burden. In 74 BC the Ilians once again demonstrated their loyalty to Rome by siding with the Roman general Lucullus against Mithridates VI. Following the final defeat of Mithridates in 63–62, Pompey rewarded the city's loyalty by becoming the benefactor of Ilion and patron of Athena Ilias.

In 48 BC, Gaius Julius Caesar likewise bestowed benefactions on the city, recalling the city's loyalty during the Mithridatic Wars, the city's connection with his cousin Lucius, and the family's claim that they were ultimately descended from Venus through the Trojan prince Aeneas and therefore shared kinship with the Ilians. In 20 BC, the emperor Augustus (Gaius Octavian Julius Caesar Augustus) visited Ilion and stayed in the house of a leading citizen, Melanippides son of Euthydikos. As a result of his visit, he also financed the restoration and rebuilding of the sanctuary of Athena Ilias, the bouleuterion (council house) and the theatre. Soon after work on the theatre was completed in 12–11 BC, Melanippides dedicated a statue of Augustus in the theatre to record this benefaction.

A new city called Ilium (from Greek Ilion) was founded on the site in the reign of the Roman emperor Augustus. It flourished until the establishment of Constantinople. It fell within the Roman province Hellespontus in the civil Diocese of Asia.

Archaeological excavations have identified one church building in the lower city. Its size—30 by 18 metres (98 ft × 59 ft)—and the quality of its mosaic floor suggests that it may have been the main church. It was constructed around 400. No temples seem to have been converted into churches and no church has been found on the acropolis.

Towards the end of the reign of Gallienus, probably in 267, Ilium was sacked by the Goths returning from the sack of Athens. "After the depredations of the Goths, the city entered the twilight zone."

=== Christian bishopric ===
From the 4th century AD until the Byzantine era, perhaps as late as the 10th century, Ilion was the seat of a Christian bishop.

== Current status ==
The Turkish government created the Historical National Park at Troy on 30 September 1996. It contains 136 square kilometres (53 sq mi) to include Troy and its vicinity, centered on Troy. The purpose of the park is to protect the historical sites and monuments within it, as well as the environment of the region. In 1998 the park was accepted as a UNESCO World Heritage Site.

Public access to the ancient site is along the road from the vicinity of the museum in Tevfikiye to the east side of Hisarlık. In its square is a large wooden horse monument, with a ladder and internal chambers for use of the public. Bordering the square is the gate to the site. The public passes through turnstiles. Admission is usually not free. Within the site, the visitors tour the features on dirt roads or for access to more precipitous features on railed boardwalks. There are many overlooks with multilingual boards explaining the feature. Most are outdoors, but a permanent canopy covers the site of an early megaron and wall.

In 2018, the Troy Museum (Turkish: Troya Müzesi) was opened at Tevfikiye village 800 metres (870 yd) east of the excavation. A design contest for the architecture had been won by Yalin Mimarlik in 2011. The cube-shaped building with extensive underground galleries holds more than 40,000 portable artefacts, 2000 of which are on display. Artifacts were moved here from a few other former museums in the region. The range is the entire prehistoric Troad.

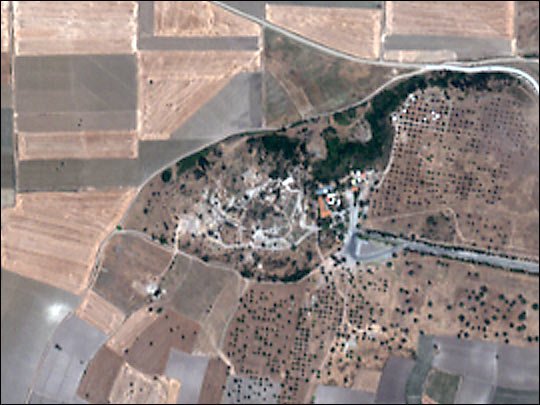
The west side of Troy Ridge. The road from Tevfikiye enters from the right.

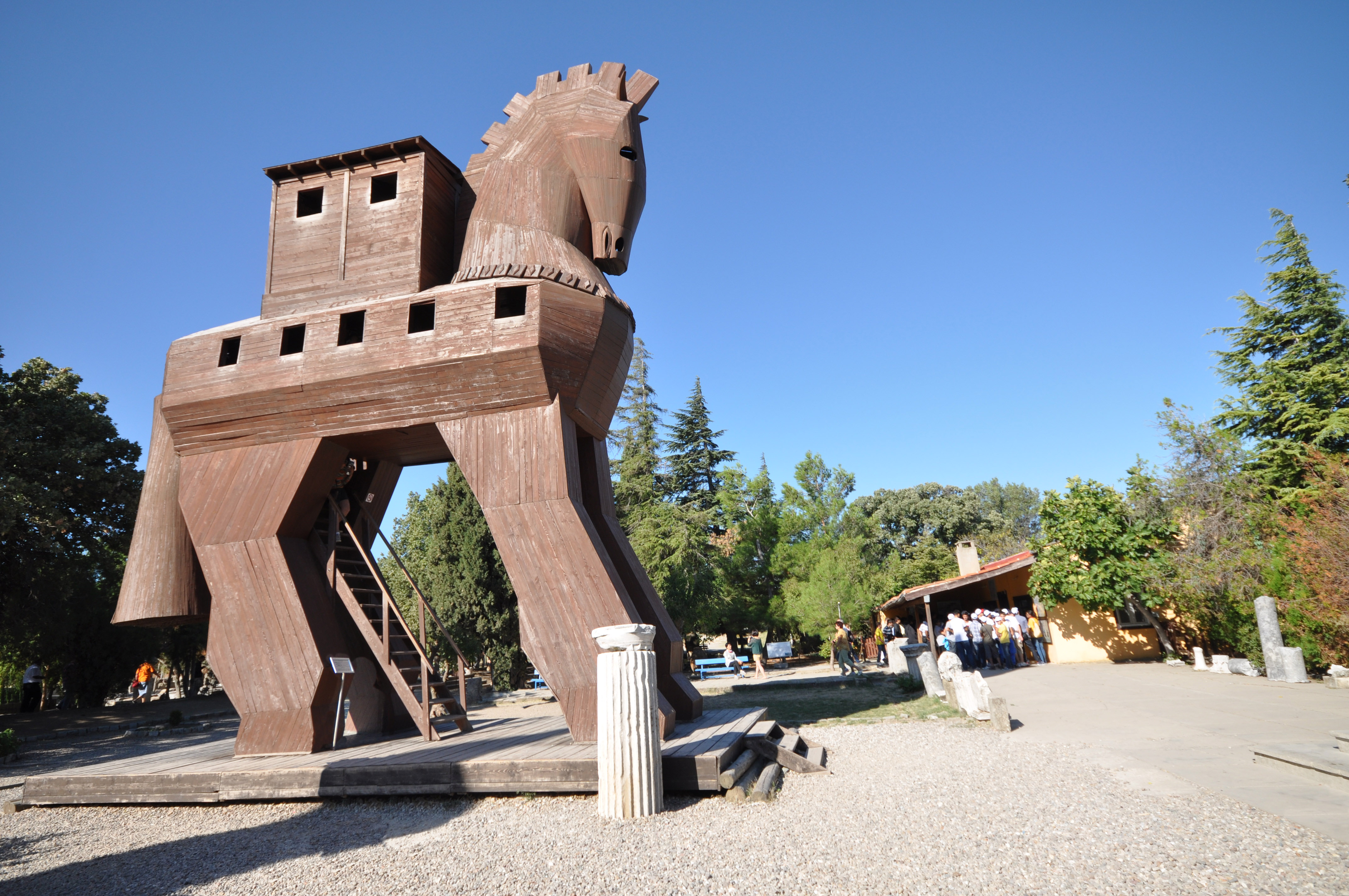
Wooden Trojan Horse monument in the plaza before the modern gate to the ancient city

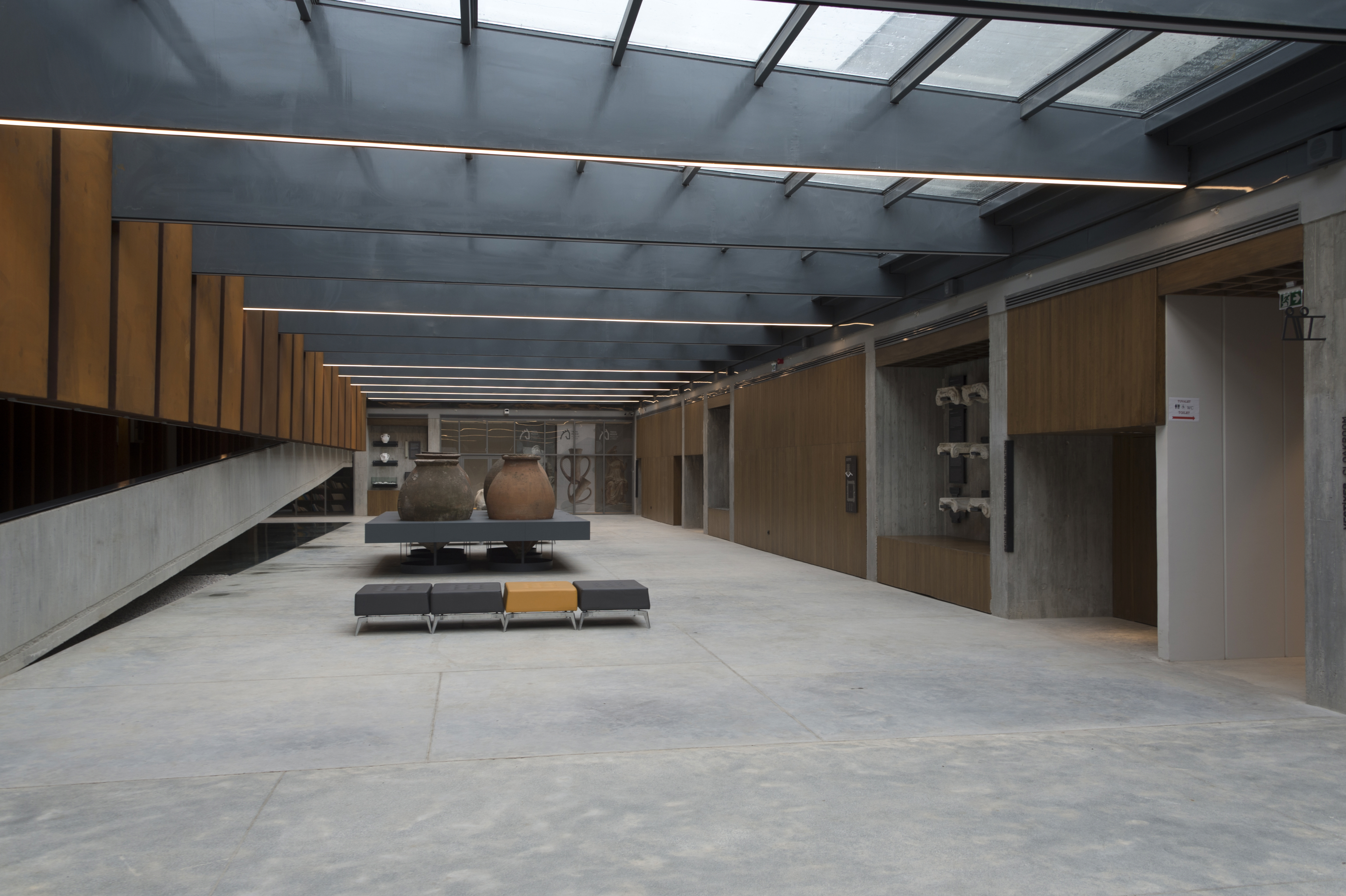
Troy Museum subterranean interior

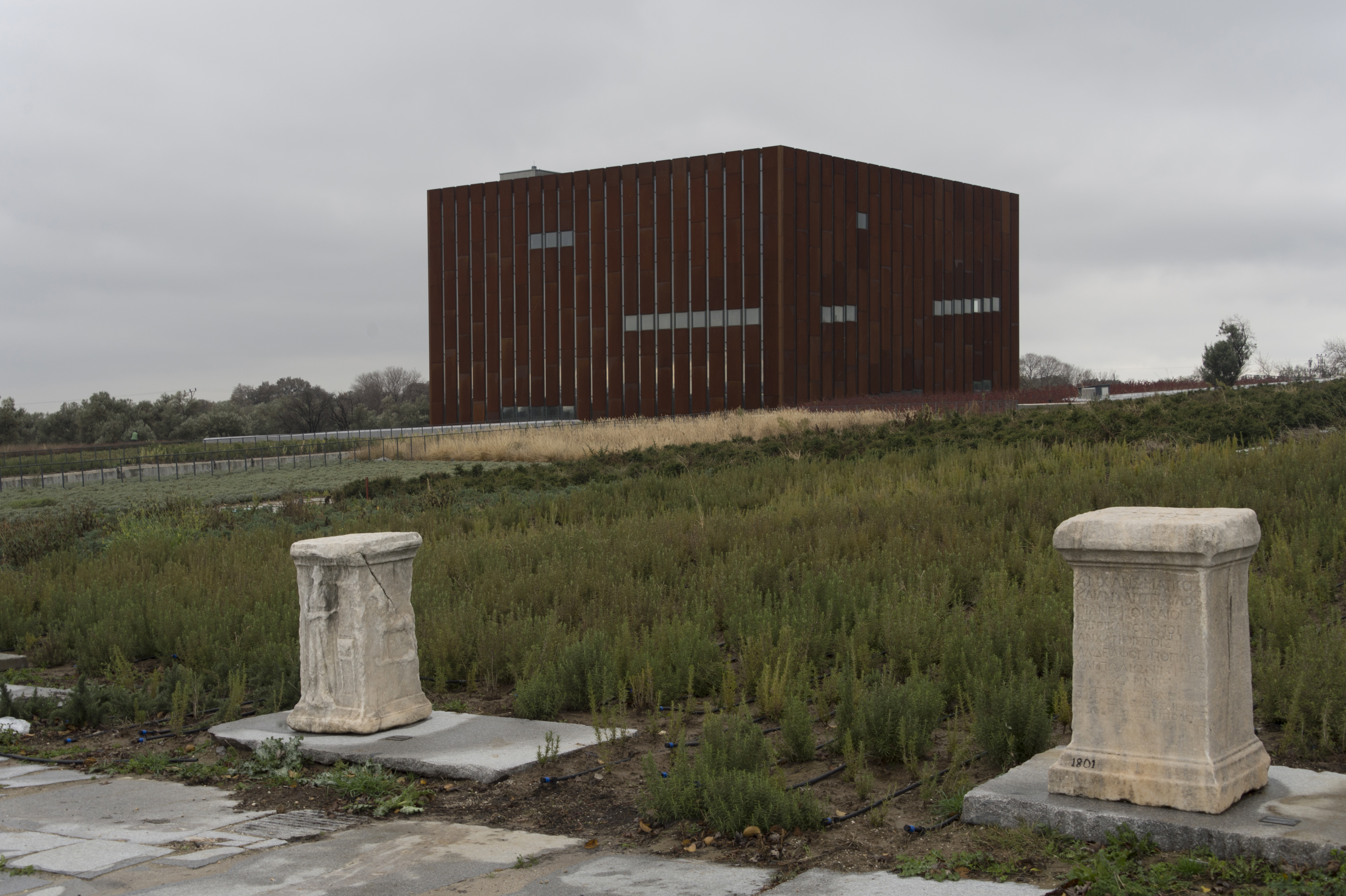
Troy Museum aboveground. Most of the entire field in which it sits roofs the underground galleries, work, and storage spaces. These are accessed via ramps not shown. There are also outdoor display spaces.

== See also ==
- Ancient settlements in Turkey
- Cities of the ancient Near East
- Dardanians (Trojan)
- The Golden Bough (mythology)
- Luwians – Group of Anatolian peoples
- Seha River Land – Bronze Age kingdom in Anatolia
- Stratigraphy – Study of rock layers and their formation
- Trojan War in popular culture
