= Schliemann's Trench =

Feature of Troy archaeological site at Hisarlik, Turkey

Coordinates: 39°57′28″N 26°14′17″E

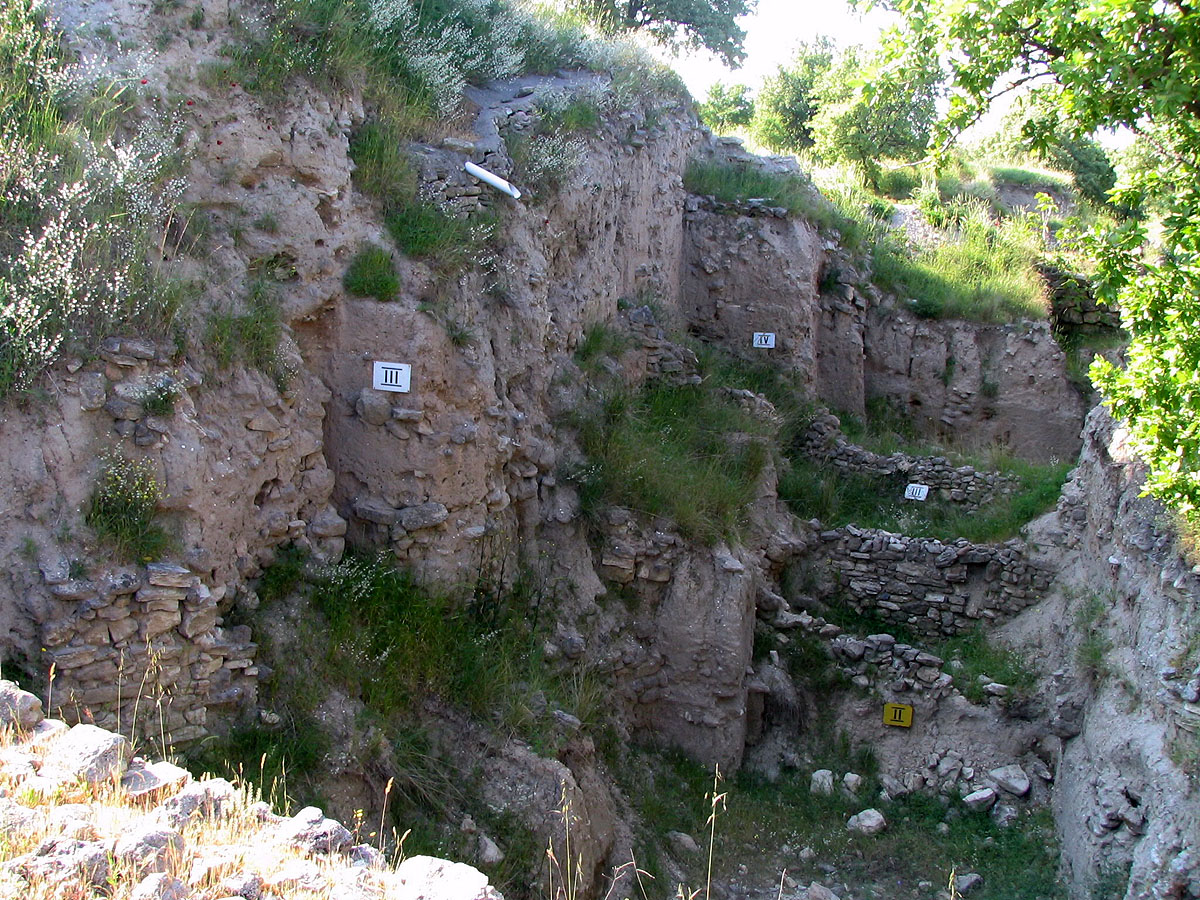
Schliemann's Trench, as seen in 2012

Schliemann's Trench (sometimes referred to as Schliemann's Great Trench) is the name commonly given to a 17-metre-deep (56-foot) gash cut into the side of Hisarlik, Turkey, between 1871 and 1890 by Heinrich Schliemann in his quest to find the ruins of Troy. By digging this trench, Schliemann destroyed a large portion of the site.

== Excavation of the trench ==
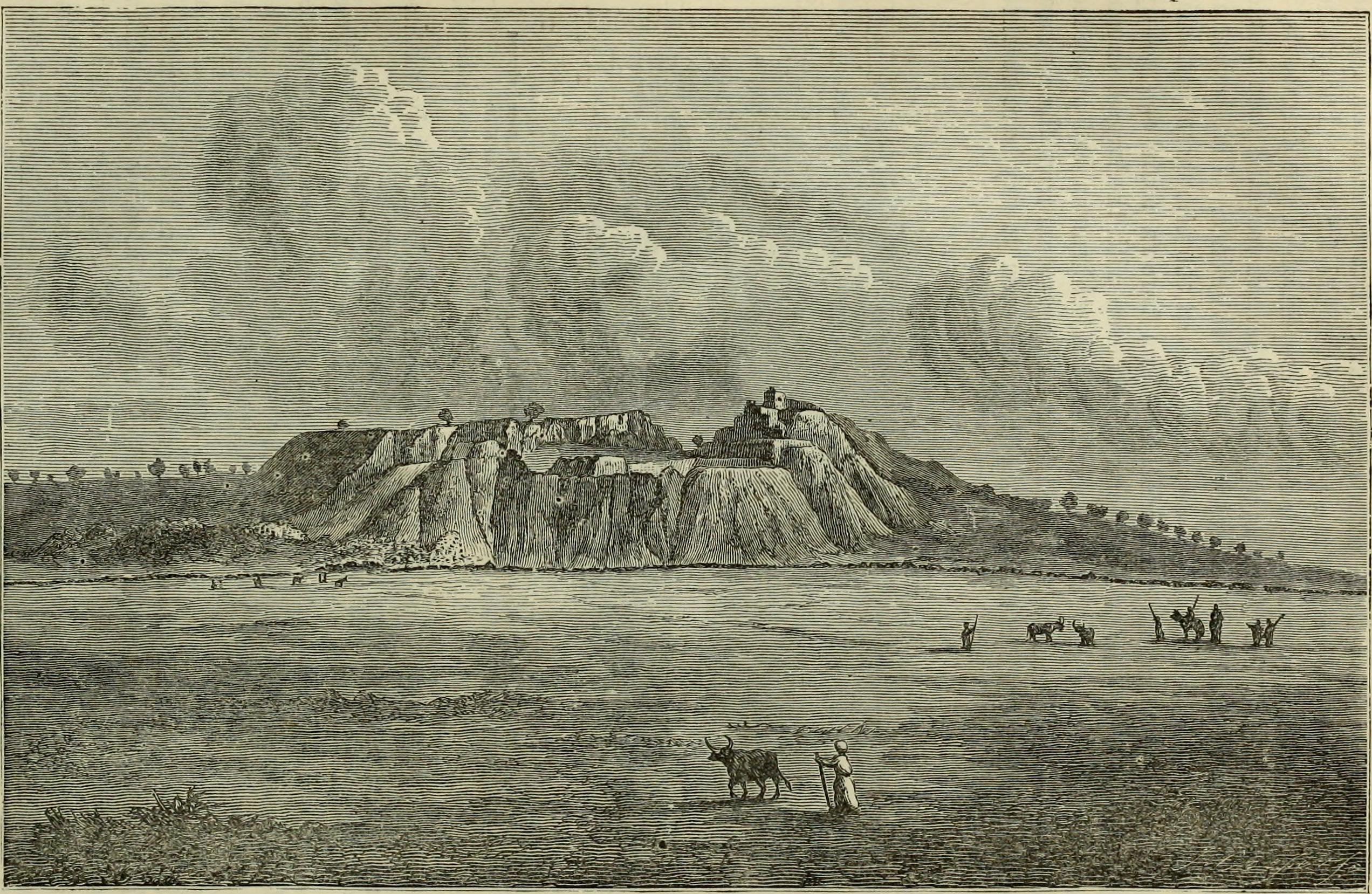
A depiction of Hisarlik, from Schliemann's book Ilios (1881). The notch at the top of the hill is "Schliemann's Trench".

In October–November 1871, Heinrich Schliemann "officially" began excavating the site by digging into the northern side of Hisarlik. Schliemann returned to the site in April 1872 with battering rams and windlasses, excavating a 70 metres (230 feet) wide area between the trench he had dug in 1871 and trenches dug earlier by Frank Calvert. Around this time, Schliemann also widened his north–south trench, extending it clear through the southern end of the hill. In the middle of this north–south trench, Schliemann dug further down until he hit bedrock, uncovering in the process the remnants of two separate citadel (walls IIb and IIc), which he believed were the "Tower of Ilion".

In February 1873, Schliemann continued excavations in the north-eastern part of Hisarlik and started new excavations on the hill's southeast side. During this season, Schliemann discovered the southwestern part of Troy II's citadel walls as well as Gate FM, its associated ramp, and buildings that Schliemann believed to be the remnants of Priam's palace. Schliemann would return to the site in 1878 and 1879 (during which he focused most of his attention on clearing the middle of the hill and deepening his north–south trench), 1882 (during which, among other things, he continued to deepen the north–south trench), and 1890 (when he focused most of his attention on excavating the exposed parts of the Troy II citadel).

After Schliemann's excavations ceased, the 17 metres (56 feet) deep north–south trench became a notable feature of the site, and it is still visible to this day. The trench is often cited as an example of Schliemann's inexperience, for in digging through Hisarlik until he hit bedrock, Schliemann destroyed much of the site, thus "mak[ing] a hugely complex site even more so".

== Bibliography ==
- Cline, Eric (2018). Three Stones Make a Wall: The Story of Archaeology. Princeton, NJ: Princeton University Press. ISBN 9780691184258.
- Easton, Donald F. (2014). "The First Excavations at Troy: Brunton, Calvert and Schliemann". In Pernicka, Ernst; Rose, Charles Brian; Jablonka, Peter (eds.). Studia Troica. Vol. 5. Bonn, Germany: Dr. Rudolf Habelt GmbH. ISBN 9783774939028.
- Freely, John (2000). The Companion Guide to Istanbul and Around the Marmara. Woodbridge, UK: Companion Guides. ISBN 9781900639316.
- Huler, Scott (2010). No-Man's Lands: One Man's Odyssey Through The Odyssey. New York City: Crown. ISBN 9781400082834.
- Stiebing, William H. (1994). Uncovering the Past: A History of Archaeology. Oxford, UK: Oxford University Press. ISBN 9780195089219.
- Vaughan, A.C. (1959). The House of the Double Axe: The Palace at Knossos. New York City: Doubleday.
