= Gentinos =

Town in ancient Troad

Coordinates: 39°52′37″N 26°16′45″E

Gentinos (Ancient Greek: Γεντῖνος) was a town in ancient Troad. The inhabitants of Gentinos are cited in the tribute records of Athens between the years 452/1 and 444/3 BCE, so the city was part of the Delian League. Gentinos minted bronze coins inscribed «ΓΕΝ» or «ΓΕΝΤΙ».

Its site is tentatively located near Ballı Dağ, Asiatic Turkey.
