= Jana Siegelová =

Czech Hittitologist

- Born: 11 September 1944 (age 82); Tábor, Czechoslovakia

Academic background
- Education: Charles University; Czechoslovak Academy of Sciences

Academic work
- Discipline: Hittitology
- Institutions: Náprstek Museum

Jana Soucková-Siegelová (born 11 September 1944) is a Czech Hittitologist who was the director of the Náprstek Museum in Prague from 1979 until 2008.

== Career ==
Siegelová studied cuneiform and prehistory at Charles University, Prague, and joined the Náprstek Museum after graduating in 1967. In 1971 she published her dissertation on two Hittite mythological-literary texts, the tale of Appu and his sons (CTH 360) and the Song of Ḫedammu (CTH 348), as part of the series Studien zu den Boğazköy-Texten. In the same year, she became curator of the Ancient Near East collection in the Náprstek Museum. In 1979, Siegelová became the director of the museum, a position she held until 2008.

In 1996, Siegelová published a systematic bibliography of Hittitology, 1915-1995, which her husband, the Hittitologist Vladimír Souček, had also contributed to prior to his death. Siegelová subsequently continued to contribute to Hittite bibliographical projects, notably the Systematic Bibliography and the bibliographical database hosted by the Hethitologie Portal Mainz. A festschrift for Siegelová, Audias fabulas veteres. Anatolian Studies in Honor of Jana Součková-Siegelová, was published in 2016.

== Select publications ==
- (1970) “Ein hethitisches Fragment des Atra-ḫasīs Epos”, Archiv Orientální 38, 135–139.
- (1971) Appu-Märchen und Ḫedammu-Mythus, Studien zu den Boğazköy-Texten 14, Wiesbaden.
- (1986) Hethitische Verwaltungspraxis im Lichte der Wirtschafts- und Inventardokumente, I–III, Praha.
- with Souček, V. (1996) Systematische Bibliographie der Hethitologie 1915–1995. Zusammengestellt unter Einschluss der einschlägigen Rezensionen, I–III, Praha.
- (2001) “Der Regionalpalast in der Verwaltung des hethitischen Staates”, Altorientalische Forschungen 28, 193–208.
- with Tsumoto, H. (2011). "Metals and metallurgy in Hittite Anatolia". in eds. Genz, H. and D. P. Mielke, Insights into Hittite History and Archaeology, Colloquia antiqua 2, Peeters, 275-300.
