= Historicity of the Iliad =

Debate on the factuality of the Homeric canon

The historical authenticity of the Iliad has been a topic of scholarly debate for centuries and forms one part of the Homeric Question. The Iliad recounts the Trojan War between the city of Troy and a coalition of Mycenaean Greek states, leading to the destruction of Troy. While researchers of the 18th century had largely rejected the story of the Trojan War as fable, the discoveries made by Heinrich Schliemann at Hisarlik reopened the question. The subsequent excavation of the site and the discovery of the toponym "Wilusa" in cuneiform Hittite correspondence has made it plausible that the Trojan War cycle was at least remotely based on a historical conflict of the 12th century BC, even if the poems of Homer remembered the event only through the distortion of four centuries of oral tradition.

== History ==
=== Pre-modern views ===
In Ancient Greece, the Trojan War was generally regarded as a historical event, though the details of the story were matters of debate. For instance, Herodotus argued that Homer had exaggerated the story and that the Trojans had been unable to return Helen because she was in Egypt. When sixth-century Athenians cited Homer to justify their side in a territorial dispute with Megara, the Megarans responded by accusing the Athenians of falsifying the text.

The Trojan War continued to be regarded as essentially historical during the Roman Empire, even after its Christianization. In the time of Strabo, geographic writings discussed the identity of sites mentioned by Homer. Eusebius of Caesarea's influential Chronicon gave Troy the same historical weight as Abraham in his universal history of humankind. Jerome's Chronicon followed Eusebius, and all the medieval chroniclers began with summaries of this universal history.

Medieval Europeans continued to accept the Trojan War as historical, with dynasties often claiming descent from Trojan heroes. Geoffrey of Monmouth's pseudo-genealogy traced a Trojan origin for royal Britons in Historia Regum Britanniae, and Fredegar gave a similar origin myth for the Merovingians in which they were descended from a legendary King Francio, who had built a new Troy at Trèves (Trier).

=== Early modern views ===
In the early modern era, attitudes towards the legends grew more skeptical. Blaise Pascal characterized the story as merely a "romance", commenting that "nobody supposes that Troy and Agamemnon existed any more than the apples of the Hesperides. Homer had no intention to write history, but only to amuse us." During the 19th century the stories of Troy were devalued as fables by George Grote.

=== Modern scholarship ===
In the 1870s, Heinrich Schliemann reopened the question with his archaeological excavations at Hisarlik. This site had been previously identified as Classical Ilion, where ancients had believed the legendary war to have occurred. Underneath the classical city, Schliemann found the remains of numerous earlier settlements, one of which he declared to be that of the city of Homeric legend. Subsequent excavations have shown that this city was in fact a millennium too early to have coexisted with Mycenaean palaces.

Since Schliemann, the site has been further excavated and reappraised numerous times, with particular attention to the layers which did coexist with the Mycenaeans, known collectively as Late Bronze Age Troy. Additional lines of research have included excavations at other sites such as Mycenae, examination of potential references to Troy in Hittite records, and philological study of the Iliad and Odyssey themselves. Despite these achievements, there remains no consensus for or against a real Trojan War, and some scholars regard the question as unanswerable.

== Status of the Iliad ==
The more that is known about Bronze Age history, the clearer it becomes that it is not a straightforward question, but one of assessing of how much historical knowledge is present in Homer, and of what historical period. Finley concludes that it represents memories of Dark Age Greece, while the dominant view, expressed in A Companion to Homer by Wace and Stebbings (1962), believes that Homer has preserved memories of Mycenaean Greece.

The narrative focus of the Iliad is not the strategy of the war, but the psychology of the warriors, assuming common knowledge of the Trojan War as a back-story. No scholars now hold that the specific events of the tale (many involving divine intervention) are historical fact; however, few claim that the story is entirely devoid of memories of Mycenaean times.

Martin L. West has mentioned that such an approach "misconceives" the problem, and that Troy probably fell to a much smaller group of attackers in a much shorter time.

== The Iliad as essentially legendary ==
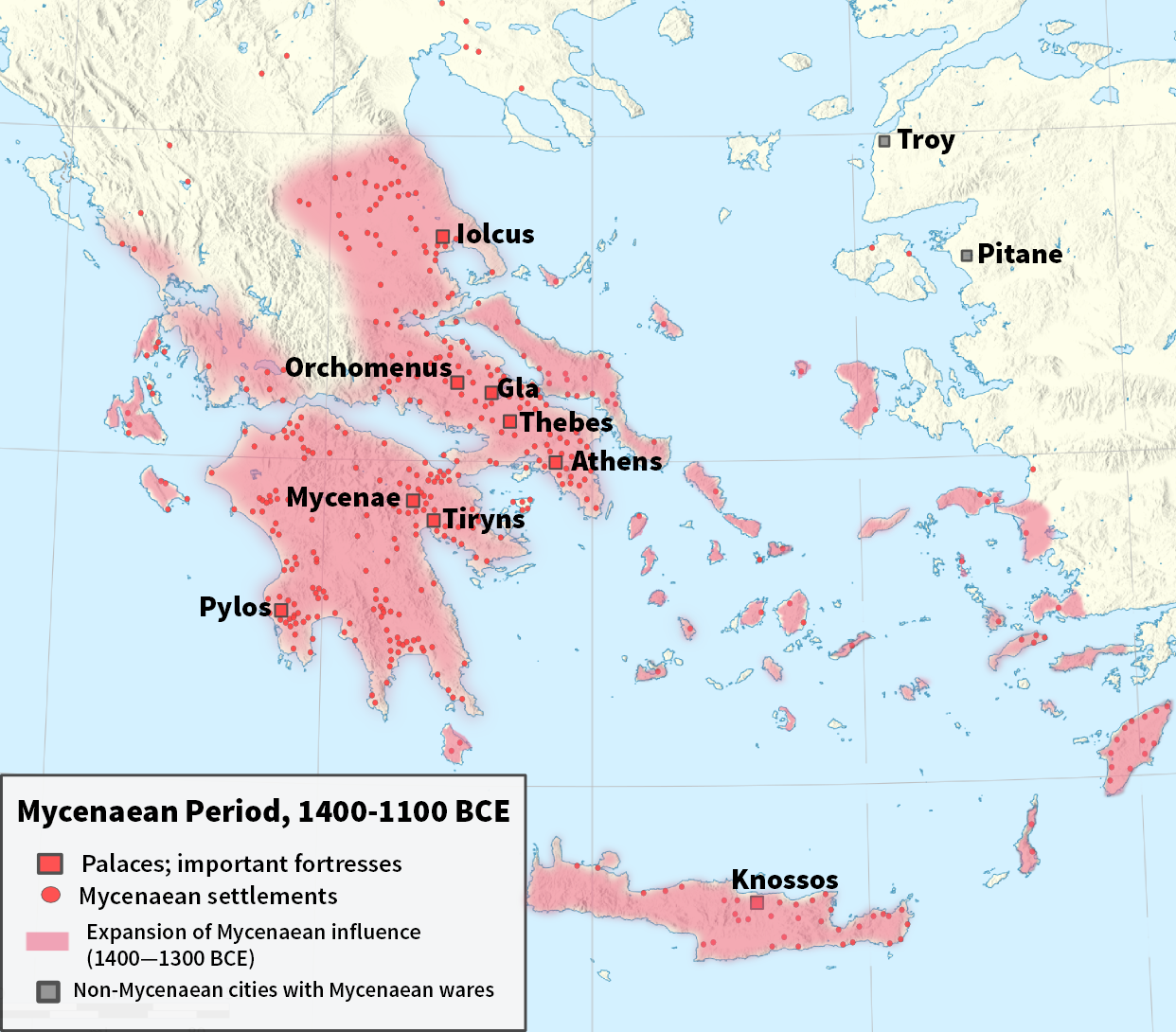
Map of the Mycenaean culture area 1400–1200 BC (unearthed sites in red dots)

Some archaeologists and historians, most notably, until his death in 1986, Moses I. Finley, (Note: Finley vigorously attacked Michael Wood's In Search of the Trojan War, a wide-ranging work exploring the historicity of the Troy legend, when it first appeared in 1985, four years before modern archaeology was undertaken at the Hisarlik site: Wood, Michael (2005). "Preface". In search of the Trojan War (2008 ed.). London: BBC Books. p. 11. ISBN 0563522658.) maintain that none of the events in Homer's works are historical. Others accept that there may be a foundation of historical events in the Homeric narrative, but say that, in the absence of independent evidence, it is not possible to separate fact from myth.

In The World of Odysseus, Finley presents a picture of the society represented by the Iliad and the Odyssey, avoiding the question as "beside the point that the narrative is a collection of fictions from beginning to end". Finley was in a minority when his World of Odysseus first appeared in 1954. With the understanding that war was the normal state of affairs, Finley observed that a ten-year war was out of the question, indicating Nestor's recall of a cattle-raid in Elis as a norm, and identifying the scene in which Helen points out to Priam the Achaean leaders in the battlefield as "an illustration of the way in which one traditional piece of the story was retained after the war had ballooned into ten years and the piece had become rationally incongruous".

Finley, for whom the Trojan War is "a timeless event floating in a timeless world", analyzes the question of historicity, aside from invented narrative details, into five essential elements: 1. Troy was destroyed by a war; 2. the destroyers were a coalition from mainland Greece; 3. the leader of the coalition was a king named Agamemnon; 4. Agamemnon's overlordship was recognized by the other chieftains; 5. Troy, too, headed a coalition of allies. Finley does not find any evidence for any of these elements.

Aside from narrative detail, Finley pointed out that, aside from some correlation of Homeric placenames and Mycenaean sites, (Note: "Although the poverty of the finds in Odysseus's Ithaca is one of the notable exceptions".) there is also the fact that the heroes lived at home in palaces (oikoi) unknown in Homer's day; far from a nostalgic recall of the Mycenaean age, Finley asserts that "the catalog of his errors is very long".

His arms bear a resemblance to the armour of his time, quite unlike the Mycenaean, although he persistently casts them in antiquated bronze, not iron. His gods had temples, and the Mycenaeans built none, whereas the latter constructed great vaulted tombs to bury their chieftains in and the poet cremates his. A neat little touch is provided by the battle chariots. Homer had heard of them, but he did not really visualize what one did with chariots in a war. So his heroes normally drove from their tents a mile or less away, carefully dismounted, and then proceeded to battle on foot.

What the poet believed he was singing about was the heroic past of his own Greek world, Finley concludes.

During the early twenty-first century, Fred Woudhuizen and Frank Kolb suggested that the Homeric stories represented a synthesis of many old Greek stories of various Bronze Age sieges and expeditions, fused together in the Greek memory during the "Dark Ages" which followed the end of the Mycenean civilization. In this view, no historical city of Troy existed anywhere: the name perhaps derives from a people called the Troies, who probably lived in central Greece. The identification of the hill at Hisarlık as Troy is, in this view, a late development, following the Greek colonisation of Asia Minor during the 8th century BC.

It is also worth comparing the details of the Iliadic story to those of older Mesopotamian literature—most notably, the Epic of Gilgamesh. Names, set scenes, and even major parts of the story, are strikingly similar according to some scholars. Some academics believe that writing first came to Greece from the east, via traders, and these older poems were used to demonstrate the uses of writing, thus heavily influencing early Greek literature.

== The Iliad as essentially historical ==
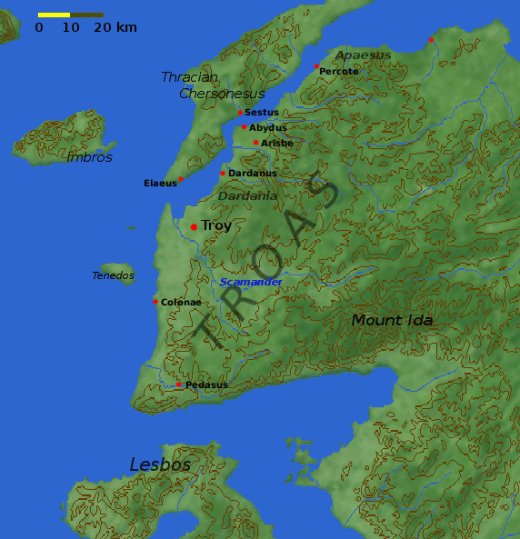
Map of the Troad (Troas)

Another opinion is that Homer was heir to an unbroken tradition of oral epic poetry reaching back some 500 years into Mycenaean times. The case is set out in The Singer of Tales by Albert B. Lord, citing earlier work by folklorist and mythographer Milman Parry. In this view, the poem's core could represent a historical campaign that took place at the eve of the Mycenaean era. Much legendary material may have been added, but in this view it is meaningful to ask for archaeological and textual evidence corresponding to events referred to in the Iliad. Such a historical background would explain the geographical knowledge of Hisarlık and the surrounding area, which could alternatively have been obtained, in Homer's time, by visiting the site. Some verses of the Iliad have been argued to predate Homer's time, and could conceivably date back to the Mycenaean era. Such verses only fit the poem's meter if certain words are pronounced with a /w/ sound, which had vanished from most dialects of Greece by the 7th century BC.

== The Iliad as partly historical ==
As mentioned above, however, it is most likely that the Homeric tradition contains elements of historical fact and elements of fiction interwoven. Homer describes a location, presumably in the Bronze Age, with a city. This city was near Mount Ida in northwest Turkey. Such a city did exist, at the mound of Hisarlık.

=== Hittite evidence ===
Hittite texts provide evidence that Late Bronze Age Troy was indeed a regionally important city, that it was already known by variants of its later names, and that it was of political interest to Mycenaean Greeks (Ahhiyawans). Some stray details appearing in these records have been speculatively linked to mythic characters and events. However, the texts provide no concrete evidence for the Trojan War having occurred or for any particular historical kernel in the myths.

The Hittite placenames Wilusa and Taruisa occurring in these texts are generally regarded as corresponding to the later Greek terms (W)ilios and Troia. These correspondences were first proposed by the Swiss scholar Emil Forrer on the basis of linguistic similarities, but are now supported by geographical evidence as well. Notably, a treaty was drawn up about 1280 BCE between the Hittite king Muwatalli II and Alaksandu of Wilusa (Alexander of Ilios), guaranteed by the Wilusan patron deity Apaliunas (Apollo). From the texts, one can infer Wilusa's location relative to other identified places such as the Seha River, and combining these data points places Wilusa in the Troad—a region in which Hisarlik is the only major Bronze Age city attested in the archaeological record. However, despite the strength of this argument, it is still grounded in circumstantial evidence, and scholars do not regard it as beyond question.

A number of Hittite documents attest to ongoing political turmoil in Western Anatolia which affected Wilusa on occasion. Notable among these documents are the Manapa-Tarhunda letter and Tawagalawa letter, which concern the anti-Hittite activities of a warlord named Piyamaradu. Since Piyamaradu appears to have been supported by the Ahhiyawa and these letters also mention Wilusa, these events have sometimes been interpreted as a historical basis for the Trojan War, particularly in popular literature. Although this interpretation remains a viable hypothesis, it is not favored by current scholarship. For instance, a section divider in the Manapa-Tarhunta letter seems to suggest that Piyamaradu's activities were not related to Wilusa. Similarly, although the Tawagalawa letter alludes to a previous disagreement between the Hittites and Ahhiyawa concerning Wilusa, it gives no indication that tensions escalated beyond strongly worded cuneiform tablets. Noted Hittiteologist Trevor Bryce cautions that our current understanding of Wilusa's history does not provide evidence for there having been an actual Trojan War since "the less material one has, the more easily it can be manipulated to fit whatever conclusion one wishes to come up with".

=== Homeric evidence ===
Map of Bronze Age Greece as described in Homer's Iliad

The Catalogue of Ships mentions a great variety of cities, some of which, including Athens, were inhabited both in the Bronze Age and in Homer's time, and some of which, such as Pylos, were not rebuilt after the Bronze Age. This suggests that the names of no-longer-existing towns were remembered from an older time, because it is unlikely that Homer would have managed to name successfully a diverse list of important Bronze Age cities that were, in his time, only a few blocks of rubble on the surface, often without even names. Furthermore, the cities enumerated in the Catalogue are given in geographical clusters, this revealing a sound knowledge of Aegean topography. Some evidence is equivocal: locating the Bronze Age palace of Sparta, the traditional home of Menelaus, under the modern city has been challenging, though archaeologists have uncovered at least two Mycenaean era palatial center sites close to ancient Sparta, located at Agios Vasileios and Menelaion.

=== Mycenaean evidence ===
Likewise, in the Mycenaean Greek Linear B tablets, some Homeric names appear, including Achilles (Linear B: 𐀀𐀑𐀩𐀄, a-ki-re-u), (Note: The word a-ki-re-u which is found on the KN Vc 106 tablet, has been identified as Akhilleus.) a name which was also common in the classical period, noted on tablets from both Knossos and Pylos. The Achilles of the Linear B tablet is a shepherd, not a king or warrior, but the very fact that the name is an authentic Bronze Age name is significant. These names in the Homeric poems presumably remember, if not necessarily specific people, at least an older time when people's names were not the same as they were when the Homeric epics were written down. Some story elements from the tablets appear in the Iliad.

=== Geological evidence ===
In November 2001, geologist John C. Kraft from the University of Delaware presented the results of investigations into the geology of the region that had started in 1977. The geologists compared the present geology with the landscapes and coastal features described in the Iliad and other classical sources, notably Strabo's Geographia. Their conclusion was that there is regularly a consistency between the location of Troy as Hisarlik (and other locations such as the Greek camp), the geological evidence, and descriptions of the topography and accounts of the battle in the Iliad.

== See also ==
- Archaeological layers of ancient Troy
- Geography of the Odyssey
- Sources and parallels of the Exodus
