= Trojan language =

Ancient language of Troy

Trojan
- (unattested)
- Region: Troy
- Era: c. 1300 BCE
- Language family: unclassified

Language codes
- ISO 639-3: –

The Trojan language was the language spoken in Troy during the Late Bronze Age. The identity of the language is unknown, and it is not certain that there was one single language used in the city at the time. A putative Trojan script was discovered by Heinrich Schliemann on several artifacts, although it is extremely unclear if this script is a single script, or indeed writing at all.

== Hypotheses ==
=== Luwian ===
One candidate language is Luwian, an Anatolian language which was widely spoken in Western Anatolia during the Late Bronze Age. Arguments in favor of this hypothesis include seemingly Luwian-origin Trojan names such as "Kukkunni" and "Wilusiya", cultural connections between Troy and the nearby Luwian-speaking states of Arzawa, and a seal with Hieroglyphic Luwian writing found in the ruins of Troy VIIb1. However, these arguments are not regarded as conclusive. No Trojan name is indisputably Luwian, and some are most likely not, for instance the seemingly Greek name "Alaksandu". Additionally, the exact connection between Troy and Arzawa remains unclear, and in some Arzawan states such as Mira, Luwian was spoken alongside both pre-Indo-European languages and later arrivals such as Greek. Finally, the Luwian seal is by no means sufficient to establish that it was spoken by the city's residents, particularly since it is an isolated example found on an easily transportable artifact.

=== Lemnian-Etruscan ===
Some scholars, such as Robert S. P. Beekes, are proponents of an east-to-west migration hypothesis on the origin of the Etruscans. These scholars place the original Etruscan homeland adjacent to ancient Troy. Herodotus claims the Etruscans sailed from Lydia to Italy. Beekes contends that the people of Lydia lived north of its classical era location. He asserts that inscriptions in Lemnian (a language related to Etruscan) found on the island of Lemnos (roughly 70 km from the Troas in Turkey, and about 50–60 km from the nearest mainland Greek coast in Thrace) were created by a small group of Etruscans who remained close to home at the time of the migration from the Proto-Tyrsenian urheimat in northwest Asia Minor. As additional support for his theory Beekes mentions the Aeneas legend, saying "it has long since been considered that the legend was based on a story about Etruscans coming to Italy". He further argues that the Hittite Truisas, the etymological root for "Troy", is also the root for "Etruscan" (a theory previously proposed by Vladimir I. Georgiev).

For historical, archaeological, genetic, and linguistic reasons, a relationship between Etruscan and the Indo-European Anatolian languages (Lydian or Luwian) has not been accepted, just as the Lydian origin story reported by Herodotus is no longer considered reliable as demonstrated by Dominique Briquel, and a hypothetical Trojan origin of the Etruscans does not enjoy the consensus of scholars specialising in Etruscan civilisation, even if it is cyclically re-proposed by Indo-European linguists and Orientalists without providing evidence. Etruscans called themselves Rasenna, which shows no resemblance to Truwiša, and no archaeological or linguistic evidence have been found in Anatolia that might prove the eastern origin of the Etruscans, just as, after more than 90 years of archaeological excavations at Lemnos, nothing has been found in that Greek island that would support a migration from Lemnos to Etruria. Linguist Rex E. Wallace summarizes the problems with the east-to-west migration hypothesis on the origin of the Etruscans:

Etruscan origins lie in the distant past. Despite the claim by Herodotus, who wrote that Etruscans migrated to Italy from Lydia in the eastern Mediterranean, there is no material or linguistic evidence to support this. Etruscan material culture developed in an unbroken chain from Bronze Age antecedents. As for linguistic relationships, Lydian is an Indo-European language. Lemnian, which is attested by a few inscriptions discovered near Kamania on the island of Lemnos, was a dialect of Etruscan introduced to the island by commercial adventurers. Linguistic similarities connecting Etruscan with Raetic, a language spoken in the sub-Alpine regions of northeastern Italy, further militate against the idea of eastern origins.

Moreover, a 2021 archeogenetic analysis of Etruscan individuals concluded that the Etruscans were autochthonous and genetically similar to the Early Iron Age Latins, and that the Etruscan language, and therefore the other languages of the Tyrrhenian family, may be a surviving language of the ones that were widespread in Europe from at least the Neolithic period before the arrival of the Indo-European languages, as already argued by German geneticist Johannes Krause who concluded that it is likely that the Etruscan language (as well as Basque, Paleo-Sardinian and Minoan) "developed on the continent in the course of the Neolithic Revolution". The lack of recent Anatolian-related admixture and Iranian-related ancestry among the Etruscans, who genetically joined firmly to the European cluster, might also suggest that the presence of a handful of inscriptions found at Lemnos, in a language related to Etruscan and Raetic, "could represent population movements departing from the Italian peninsula".

=== Greek ===
Another proposed language is Greek. Archaeologist James Mellaart in the American Journal of Archaeology summarized some of the arguments in favor of this hypothesis:

When one remembers that Luwian names in -ss and -nd- are rare in the Northwestern corner of Anatolia, Anatolian hieroglyphs absent, and that archaeology suggests that a branch of the Greeks remained behind in this region, where Ahhiyawa should be located, this may just add one more argument to the hypothesis that the "Trojans" called themselves "Akhaiwoi" and spoke some form of Greek.

However the site of Troy is devoid of Greek writings from the relevant historical period, and the current evidence points away from a Greek origin. Several artifacts marked with carved symbols were discovered by Heinrich Schliemann during his 1873 excavations, and some scholars have identified them as related to various Aegean writing systems including Linear A. However there is no consensus if these symbols represent writing at all, let alone a recognized writing system.

== In ancient Greek epics ==
In Ancient Greek literature such as the Iliad, Trojan characters are portrayed as having a common language with the Achaeans. However, scholars unanimously interpret this as a poetic convention, and not as evidence that the Trojans were Greek speakers. For instance, Calvert Watkins points out that the Spanish epic poem Cantar de mio Cid portrays its Arab characters as Spanish speakers and that the Song of Roland similarly portrays Arabs as speaking French. Some scholars have suggested that Greek-origin names for Trojan characters in the Iliad motivate a more serious argument for the Trojans having been Greek speakers. Putative etymologies for legendary names have also been used to argue that the Trojans spoke other languages such as Thracian or Lydian. These arguments have been countered on the basis that these languages would have been familiar to classical-era bards and could therefore be later inventions.

== See also ==
- Ahhiyawa
- Comparative method
- Dardanians
- Hittite language
- Indo-European languages
- Linear B
- Prehistory of Anatolia
- Trojan script
