= Walmu =

King of Wilusa

King of Wiluša

Walmu was a king of Wiluša, likely modern Hisarlık, in the late 13th century BC.

As with other Late Bronze Age rulers in western Anatolia, his existence is poorly attested. Walmu is known from only one text, the Milawata letter, which reports that he had been deposed and discusses the Hittites Empire's intent to reinstall him. The letter does not specify how Walmu was deposed or who was responsible.

== See also ==
- Ahhiyawa
- Historicity of the Iliad
- Karabel relief
- Kings of Wilusa
- Seha River Land
