= Emmanuel Laroche =

French linguist (1914-1991)

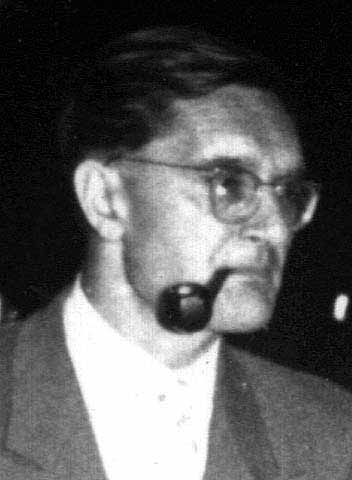
- Born: 11 July 1914; Clamart
- Died: 16 June 1991 (aged 76)
- Occupations: Linguist; Assyriologist

Emmanuel Laroche (11 July 1914 – 16 June 1991) was a French linguist and Hittitologist. An expert in the languages of ancient Anatolia (Indo-European and Hurrian), he was professor of Anatolian studies at the Collège de France (1973–1985).

== Main works ==
Hieroglyphic writings

- Les Hiéroglyphes hittites (1960, revised edition 1976)

Hittite and Luwian texts

- Études proto-hittites (1947)
- Dictionnaire de la langue louvite (1959)
- Catalogue des textes Hittites, Paris 1971

History and geography of ancient Anatolia

- Recueil d'onomastique hittite (1951)
- Le Rôle des Hittites dans l'Orient ancien (1956)
- Les Noms des Hittites (1966)

Hittite religion

- Recherches sur les noms des dieux hittites (1947)
- Le Panthéon de Yazilikaya, JCS 6 (1952)
- Kubaba déesse anatolienne et le problème des origines de Cybèle
- La Réforme religieuse du Roi Tudhaliya IV et sa signification politique (1975)

Deciphering of the Lycian language

- La Stèle trilingue du Létôon, second part: L'inscription lycienne (1979)

Hurrian

- Glossaire De La Langue Hourrite, 1980, ISBN 2-252-01984-0
