= Knésetja =

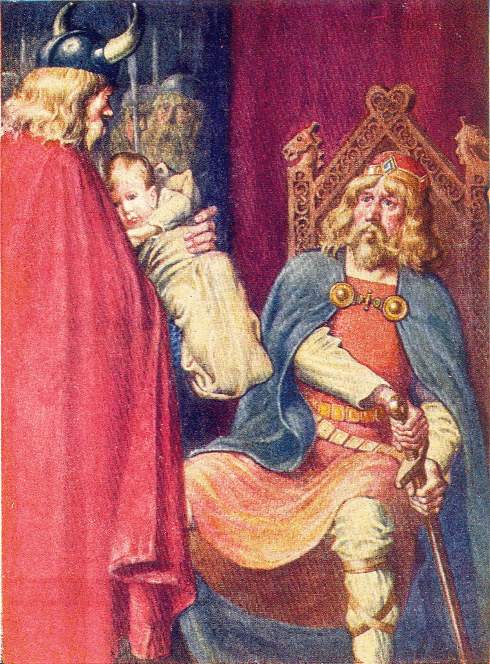
Haukur setting Haakon on king Aethelstan's knee without the king's consent. Illustration from Mary MacGregor, Stories of the Vikings (1908).

Knésetja (lit. "knee-setting"; German Kniesetzung) is the Old Norse expression for a custom in Germanic law, by which adoption was formally expressed by setting the fosterchild on the knees of the foster-father.

== Germanic law ==
When prince Haakon, the youngest son of Harald Fairhair was brought to the court of Æthelstan, the Norwegian messenger, Haukur, simply placed the child on the king's knees as soon as he came into his presence. By this act, Haakon had been adopted by Aethelstan, which also implied an insult to the English king as the foster-father was usually of lower standing than the biological father. Æthelstan became angry and wanted to kill the child on the spot, but Haukur simply said that since he was now the child's foster-father it was up to him whether he wanted to kill him and went away. Æthelstan let the child live and had him baptized. (Heimskringla, Harald Harfager's Saga).

The same gesture was also part of the formal ceremony of both engagement and marriage in early Scandinavian law. Here, the bride was set on the knees of the groom.

== Indo-European parallels ==
The Germanic procedure of Kniesetzung has parallels in various other Indo-European cultures, and has been suggested to derive from a custom in Proto-Indo-European society in comparative philology since the 1920s, although evidence for this is considered inconclusive.

In Hittite texts of the Late Bronze Age, specifically the mythological texts of the Song of Ullikummi and the Story of Appu, there are accounts of how, after the birth of the son, the father accepts the newborn from the midwife and as a sign of the son's legitimacy sets him on his knee and names him.

Antoine Meillet suggested that Latin genuīnus "innate, native; genuine" is a derivation of genū "knee".

Homer mentions setting on the knee in Iliad 9.454 and Odyssey 19.400.

Comparable customs have been suggested for Indo-Iranian and Celtic cultures.

== See also ==
- Tollere liberum
