= Trojan script =

Series of signs discovered at Troy

- Script type: Undeciphered
- Status: Extinct
- Languages: Unknown, if any

The Trojan script is a series of signs of unknown origin found on vessels from Troy excavated by Heinrich Schliemann's expedition. Their status is disputed and it is unclear whether they constitute a single system of writing, or if they are writing at all. Nevertheless, several mutually-exclusive readings of these inscriptions have been proposed over the years.

== Analysis ==
Depiction of an inscription found on the terracotta vase by the royal palace.

While excavating the archeological phase of Troy now known as Troy II, Heinrich Schliemann unearthed various objects he believed to depict a Trojan script. These include: a vase found within the royal palace, two terracotta seals, a red slate, and two clay spindle whorls. He was especially interested in the text on the vase, which, by his account, contained a letter similar to the modern "P." Schliemann initially attempted to translate the inscriptions based on the Cypriot syllabary. Émile-Louis Burnouf, a leading orientalist, racialist, and friend of Schliemann during the time, believed these inscriptions represented an ancient Graeco-Asiatic alphabet. Professor Martin Haug, another contemporary scholar, argued that the inscriptions were connected to the Phoenician alphabet and the Cypriot syllabary.

Philologists attempted to transliterate the signs as Greek. Professor Haug attempted to translate the seal; he claimed to have read the words “ta.i.o.si.i.go.” Haug believed this meant “to the divine Sigo.” He argued that the deity “Sigo” appeared in the names of Sigeum, Scamander, and Sicyon. Austrian classical philologist Theodor Gomperz attempted to decipher this same inscription. Although Gomperz utilized the same method as Haug, he instead chose to read the seal from right to left instead of from left to right. He claimed it translated to “to the divine commander." Gomperz went on to translate four more terracotta seals. However, other scholars were alarmed that perfect Greek had been found in Trojan inscriptions, and the inscriptions should predate the form of Greek which was used. These translations were soon revealed as erroneous; they had been based on a mistranslation of the Cypriot script. British Assyriologist Archibald Sayce attempted to read the translation utilizing more recent advancements in academic understanding of the Cypriot syllabary. Professor Sayce believed that the Trojan inscriptions were copies of a Babylonian script and were influenced by the Hittites.

Depiction of two of the spindle whorls.

In 1994 Louis Godart republished the inscriptions and identified the script as Linear A. This identification has been controversial: archeologist Massimo Perna rejects this theory as "highly unlikely." According to Perna, the signs found on the spindle whorls appear in numerous other ancient scripts and ornaments, and that any analysis of the signs is problematic due to inability to analyze the original finds. Alternately, Edwin L. Brown argued they were written using Linear A to transcribe a dialect of the Luwian language. Luwian was a lingua franca in late Bronze Age western Anatolia, and as yet the only accepted evidence of writing at Troy is a scribal seal inscribed with Luwian hieroglyphs found in Troy VIIb1. However a single inscription on a very portable object "can hardly be used as evidence that the population of Troy spoke Luwian."

Another inscription in the Trojan script was found in Troy II. Soviet historian of antiquity Nikolay Kazansky found them more similar to Linear B signs, while another Soviet historian, Arkady Molchanov, regarded them as "imitation of writing". Regardless of any similarities the Trojan symbols have with Linear B, those from Troy II date from about a thousand years before the development of that script.

Archaeological analyses of the inscriptions have indicated that Troy III (2250–2100/2050 BCE) and Troy IV (2100/2050–2000/1950 BCE) predate Linear A, Troy V (2000/1950–1900/1850 BCE) coincides with linear A, and Troy II (2600/2550–2250 BCE) may be an intermediate link to Bronze Age societies such as the Usatove or Ezero cultures.

== Claimed readings of inscriptions ==
Drawing by Soviet historian of antiquities Nikolay Kazansky which depicts a sample of the Trojan script

According to Ukrainian linguist Iurii Mosenkis's theory that the Trojan script represents an early and archaic variant of Linear A, Inscription № 2444 may be read:

ku-pa a-ro-ma ku-pa a-ro-ma

Inscription № 2445 is illegible and seems to have partly deteriorated; several signs may be identified as fragments of Linear A or Linear B signs but not as whole signs.

Classicist Edwin L. Brown claimed that two of the spindle whorls can be read as "PI-MI-D/MI-D/TA." “PI-MI-D” can be translated as “Pimidas”, a personal name in the possessive genitive. “Pi” or “Piya” appears in many ancient Anatolian names such as Piyamarandu or Pissillis. Similarly, “MI-D/TA” appears frequently in ancient Anatolian names such as Mita, Mida, and Midas. In Luwian hieroglyphics the name “Mita” means “servant.” However, in this context it may refer to devoted servitude of a deity. “Puri(y)as” may be read as a noun in the nominative singular or plural form” It is possible that this word is a cognate with the Hittite word “Purpura,” meaning “dumpling” or “lump.” If “Puri(y)as” shares the same meaning, then the term may refer to the spindle whorl itself, which was made of a lump of clay. It is possible the entire sentence may be translated to read: “Pimidas’s spindle whorl” or perhaps as “The spindle whorl is Pimidas’s.”

== See also ==
- Alphabets of Asia Minor
- Cypro-Minoan syllabary
- Old European script
- Trojan language
- Teucer
- Undeciphered writing systems
