= Hittite laws =

Ancient law related to the Hittite Empire

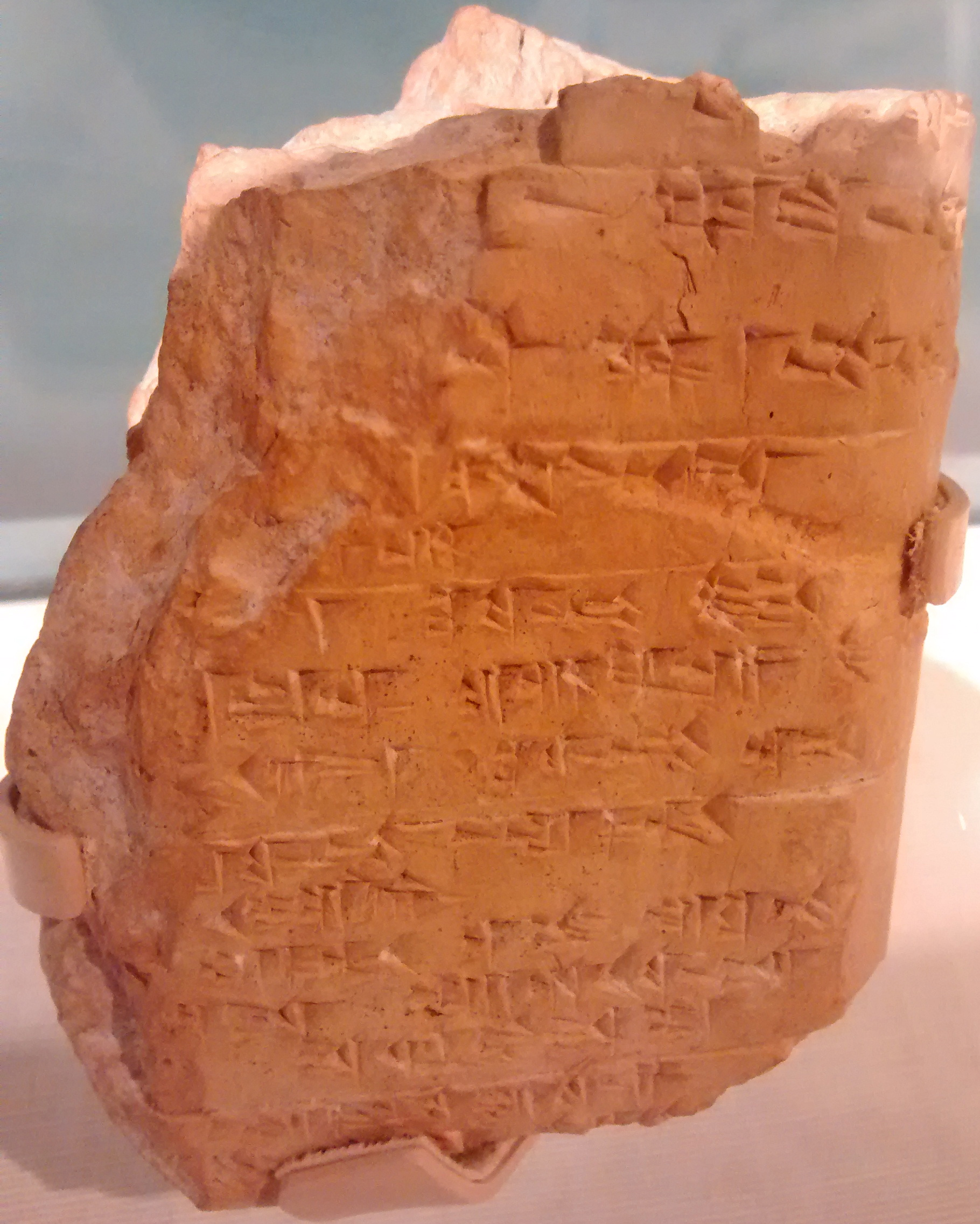
A Hittite tablet found at Hattusa, believed to be a legal deposition.

The Hittite laws, also known as the Code of the Nesilim, constitute an ancient legal code dating from c. 1650 – 1500 BCE. They have been preserved on a number of Hittite cuneiform tablets found at Hattusa (CTH 291–292, listing 200 laws). Copies have been found written in Old Hittite as well as in Middle and Late Hittite, indicating that they had validity throughout the duration of the Hittite Empire (ca. 1650–1100 BCE).

The Hittite laws reflected the empire's social structure, sense of justice, and morality, addressing common outlawed actions such as assault, theft, murder, witchcraft, and divorce, among others. The code is particularly notable due to a number of its provisions, covering social issues that included the humane treatment of slaves. Although they were considered lesser than free men, the slaves under the code were allowed to choose whomever they wanted to marry, buy property, open businesses, and purchase their freedom. In comparison with the Code of Hammurabi or the Middle Assyrian Laws, the Code of Nesilim also provided less-severe punishments for the code's violations.

== Example ==
§189 If a man has sexual relations with his own mother, it is an unpermitted sexual pairing. If a man has sexual relations with (his) daughter, it is an unpermitted sexual pairing. If a man has sexual relations with (his) son, it is an unpermitted sexual pairing.

== Origin and development ==
While it is not known who exactly authored the legal document, some historians believe that its source was someone important or of high power in the Hittite society and this could even be a king.

Changes were apparently made to penalties at least twice: firstly, the kara – kinuna changes, which generally reduced the penalties found in a former, but apparently unpreserved, 'proto-edition'; and secondly, the 'Late Period' changes to penalties in the already-modified Old Hittite version.

The Hittite laws were kept in use for some 500 years, and many copies show that, other than changes in grammar, what might be called the 'original edition' with its apparent disorder, was copied slavishly; no attempt was made to 'tidy up' by placing even obvious afterthoughts in a more appropriate position. Like the Code of Hammurabi, the Hittite laws resemble many of the laws found in the Hebrew Bible; for example, Scholz (2021) stated that the Hittite rape law §197 was reminiscent of Deuteronomy 22:29.

== Corpus ==
The laws are formulated as case laws; they start with a condition, and a ruling follows, e.g. "If anyone tears off the ear of a male or female slave, he shall pay 3 shekels of silver". The laws show an aversion to the death penalty; the usual penalty for serious offenses being enslavement to forced labour. They are preserved on two separate tablets, each with approximately 200 clauses, the first categorised as being 'of a man'; the second 'of a vine'; a third set may have existed.

The laws may be categorised into eight groups of similar clauses. These are separated for the most part by two types of seemingly orphaned clauses: Sacral or incantatory clauses, and afterthoughts. This corpus and the classification scheme are based on Dewhirst (2004).

- I Aggression and assault: Clauses 1 - 24
- II Marital relationships: Clauses 26 - 38
- III Obligations and service - TUKUL: Clauses 39 - 56
- IV Assaults on property and theft: Clauses 57 - 144
- V Contracts and prices: Clauses 145 - 161
- VI Sacral matters: Clauses 162 - 173
- VII Contracts and tariffs: Clauses 176 - 186
- VIII Sexual relationships: Clauses 187 - 200
  - §187, §188, §199 and §200 criminalise bestiality (except with horses and mules). The death penalty was a common punishment among sexual crimes.
  - §190 and §191 stipulate that if a man and a woman 'came together sexually willingly', and '[had] intercourse', 'there shall be no punishment'. These are some of the oldest examples of sexual consent in law.

== See also ==
- Hittite inscriptions
- Code of Hammurabi
- List of ancient legal codes
- List of artifacts significant to the Bible

== Literature ==
- E. Neu, StBoT 26 (1983)
- Harry Angier Hoffner Jr., The Laws of the Hittites: a Critical Edition (DMOA 23) – Leiden, New York, Köln 1997
