= Aleppo Treaty =

13th century BCE Hittite document

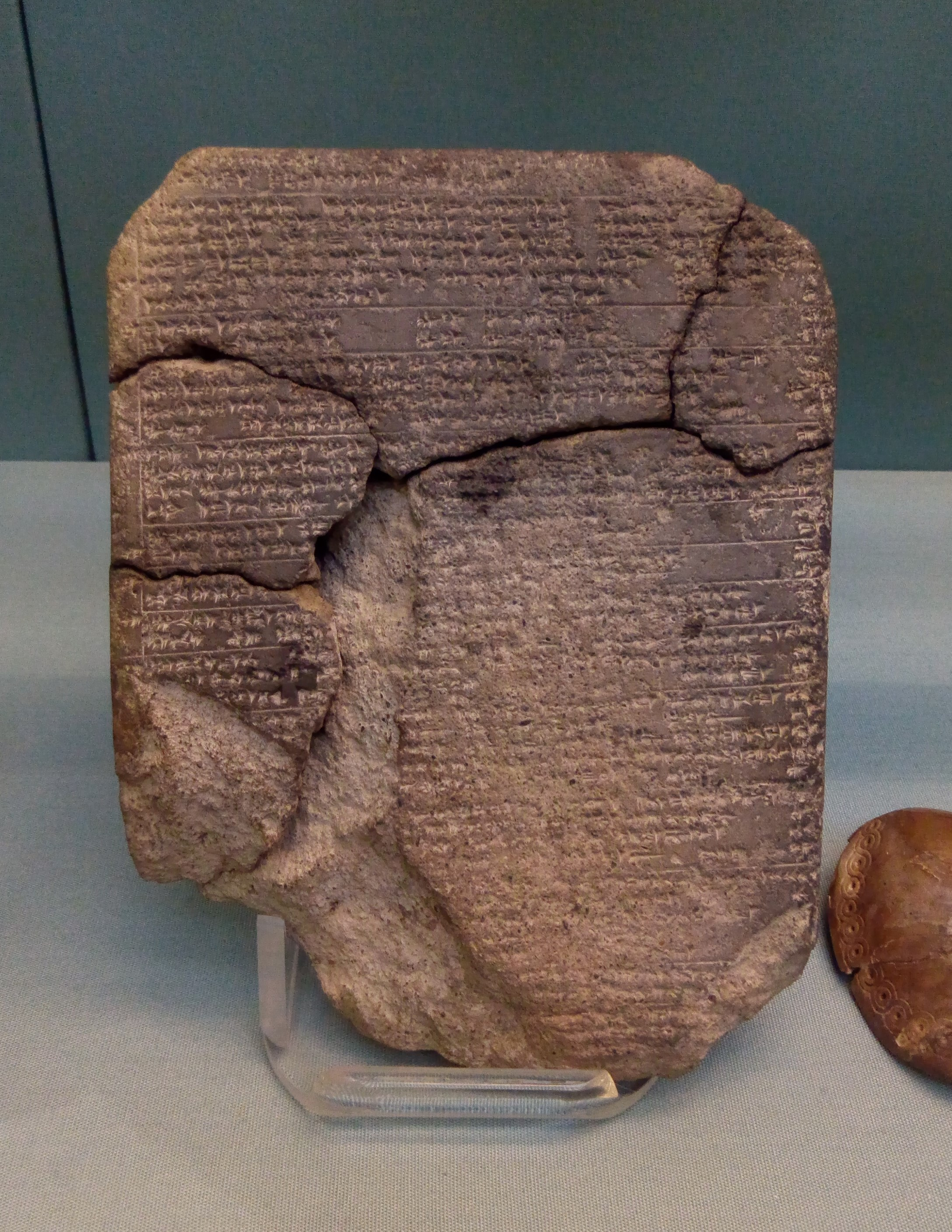
The Aleppo Treaty

The Aleppo Treaty (CTH 75) is a 13th Century BCE document created by Hittite King Muwatalli II, consisting of a copy of an earlier treaty made between Talmi-Šarruma, King of Aleppo, and Muwatalli II's father and predecessor, Muršili II. According to the text of the treaty, Muwatalli II reissued it because the original copy of the treaty was stolen.

The text of the treaty was preserved in several archival copies on clay cuneiform tablets written in Akkadian. The tablets were found in Bogazkale, Turkey, the site of ancient Hattuša. The most complete copy of the treaty is held by the British Museum. The treaty is considered a "goldmine of information on the relations among Hatti, Mittani and Aleppo" during the Bronze Age.

== Background ==
Talmi-Šarruma was a grandson of Šuppiluliuma I and thus a cousin of Muwatalli II and a nephew of Muršili II. The treaty contains a mutual loyalty clause referencing this family connection, reading, "For we are all the descendants of Šuppiluliuma, Great King. So let our house be one."

== Structure ==
The first two paragraphs of the treaty are an introduction by Muwatalli. These paragraphs include the following:

1. Muwatalli's name and titles
2. The reason for the reissuance of Muršili's treaty
3. A curse on anyone who alters the text of the treaty

According to the tablet itself, the rest of the text quotes the original treaty. The paragraphs include the following:

1. Muršili's name and titles
2. A historical prologue
3. Mutual protection pact between Hatti and Aleppo
4. Statement that Aleppo will not rebel against Hatti
5. List of human witnesses to the treaty

== Contents ==
The historical prologue portion of the treaty includes a recounting of the history of Aleppo when it belonged to the independent Kingdom of Yamhad, the destruction of the Yamhad Kingdom by Muršili I around the turn of the 16th Century BCE, the later destruction of the city of Aleppo by Tudhaliya I/II in the 15th Century BCE, and the conquering of Aleppo by Šuppiluliuma I, Muwatalli II's grandfather, in the 14th Century BCE, after a period in which an independent Aleppo was caught in the middle of the power struggle between the empires of the Hittites and Mitanni. Thus, the treaty is notable for referencing events that took place over 300 years. This provides evidence that historical records from the archives of the Hittite Old Kingdom period continued to be studied and referenced during the Hittite New Kingdom period.

The Aleppo Treaty includes a list of human witnesses, as well as a list of witnesses consisting of deities. It is not clear if these witnesses were present at the creation of the original treaty under Muršili, or if they were present for the reissuance under Muwatalli, or both.
