= Tawagalawa letter =

Letter written by a Hittite king

Asia Minor in the Amarna Period

The Tawagalawa letter (CTH 181) is a fragmentary Hittite text from the mid 13th century BC. It is notable for providing a window into relations between Hittites and Greeks during the Late Bronze Age and for its mention of a prior disagreement concerning a city called Wilusa, generally identified with the archaeological site of Troy.

== Contents ==
The Tawagalawa letter was written by a Hittite king to a king of Ahhiyawa around 1250 BC or earlier. The author is generally identified as Hattusili III, though some scholars have argued that it was written by Muwatalli II. Since the surviving text is fragmentary, the identities of the author and addressee are not known for certain, and nothing can be inferred about the identity of its addressee.

In the letter, the Hittite king seeks cooperation from the Ahhiyawan king in suppressing anti-Hittite activity in Western Anatolia. His particular concern was the activity of a warlord named Piyamaradu who had recently fled to Ahhiyawa-controlled territory after leading an unsuccessful rebellion in Lukka. Given Piyamaradu's apparent propensity for anti-Hittite activity, the author was concerned about his next moves and offered the Ahhiyawan king three proposals—either extradite him to the Hittites, expel him from Ahhiyawa, or offer asylum on the condition that he not attempt any further rebellions. No surviving documents attest to the Ahhiyawan king's decision, though the subsequent decades saw an increase in Ahhiyawa control over Western Anatolia, suggesting that the appeal was rejected.

The letter is notable in part for the tone adopted by the Hittite king. Though he scolds his Ahhiyawan counterpart for previously supporting Piyamaradu, the letter is respectful and conciliatory, and uses terms of address such as "my brother" normally reserved for rulers of major empires such as Egypt and Babylonia. Thus, the letter has been taken as evidence that the Ahhiyawa were seen as a growing power in the region and were involved in western Anatolia, and particularly in Miletus, as later also confirmed by the subsequent Milawata letter (c. 1240 BC).

== Scholarship ==
The letter gets its conventional name from a brief mention of the Ahhiyawan king's brother Tawagalawa (Hittite: 𒋫𒉿𒂵𒆷𒉿 Tawagalawa, 𒋫𒉿𒅗𒆷𒉿 Tawakalawa). His name has been proposed to be a Hittite rendition of the Greek name Eteocles (Ἐτεοκλῆς) via its older form Ἐτεϝοκλέϝης Etewoklewes, attested in Mycenean Greek as E-te-wo-ke-le-we. It has been suggested that the Greek name passed into Hittite via Luwian due to the drop (apheresis) of the initial vowel e-. Early studies erroneously assumed that the beginning of the letter concerned the activities of Tawagalawa. After reconsideration by Itamar Singer and Suzanne Heinhold-Krahmer in 1983, that part of the text was reinterpreted as referring to Piyamaradu and most scholars relegated Tawagalawa to a minor role in the letter. There are technical difficulties, however, with accepting Piyamaradu as the man who asked to become the Hittite king's vassal.

Though it was previously believed that Tawagalawa was the representative of the unnamed Ahhiyawan King in Anatolia, more recent research has shifted toward the interpretation that he was the king’s predecessor, and that the sections referring to him are flashbacks to an earlier date. Thought Tawagalawa as a Vassal king of the Great King of Ahhiyawa has been argued as well.

Piyamaradu is also mentioned in the Manapa-Tarhunta letter (c. 1295 BC) and, in the past tense, in the Milawata letter (c. 1240 BC). The Tawagalawa letter further mentions Miletus (as Millawanda) and its dependent city Atriya, as does the Milawata letter; and its governor Atpa, as does the Manapa-Tarhunta letter (although that letter does not state Atpa's fiefdom).

== Trojan connection ==
In the letter, the Hittite king refers to former hostilities between the Hittites and the Ahhiyawans over Wilusa, which had now been resolved amicably: "Oh, my brother, write to him this one thing, if nothing else: '...the king of Hatti has persuaded me about the matter of the land of Wilusa concerning which he and I were hostile to one another, and we have made peace.'"

As most scholars identify Wilusa with Troy, this reference has been said to provide "a striking background for Homeric scholars researching the origin of the tradition of the Achaean attack on Ilios." However, the verb used (ku-ru-ri-iḫ-ḫu-e-en) could indicate an exchange of strongly worded cuneiform tablets, a full-on war, or anything in between.

== See also ==
- Milawata letter
- Manapa-Tarhunta letter

== Sources ==
- Beckman, Gary; Bryce, Trevor; Cline, Eric (2012). The Ahhiyawa Texts. Society of Biblical Literature. ISBN 978-1589832688.
- Bryce, Trevor R. (1989). "The Nature of Mycenaean Involvement in Western Anatolia". Historia: Zeitschrift für Alte Geschichte. 38 (1): 1–21. ISSN 0018-2311.
- Cline, Eric H. (2013). The Trojan War: a very short introduction. New York: Oxford University Press. ISBN 9780199760275.
- Haas, Volkert (2008). Die hethitische Literatur: Texte, Stilistik, Motive [Hittite literature: Texts, stylistics, motifs] (in German). De Gruyter. ISBN 9783110193794.
- Heinhold-Krahmer, Susanne (1983). "Untersuchungen zu Piyamaradu (Teil I)". Orientalia. New Series. 52: 81–97. ISSN 0030-5367.
- Herda, Alexander (2013). "Greek (and our) views on the Carians". In Mouton, Alice; Rutherford, Ian; Yakubovich, Ilya (eds.). Luwian Identities: Culture, Language and Religion Between Anatolia and the Aegean. Brill. ISBN 9789004253414.
- Hoffner, Beckman (2009). Letters from the Hittite Kingdom. Society of Biblical Literature.
- Hogemann, Peter; Oettinger, Norbert (2018). Lydien: Ein altanatolischer Staat zwischen Griechenland und dem Vorderen Orient [Lydia, an ancient Anatolian state between Greece and the Middle East] (in German). De Gruyter. ISBN 9783110436020.
- Sasson, Jack M (1995). Civilizations of the Ancient Near East. Vol. 2. Scribner. ISBN 9780684197210.
- Singer, Itamar (1983). "Western Anatolia in the Thirteenth Century B.C. According to the Hittite Sources". Anatolian Studies. 33: 205–217. doi:10.2307/3642710. ISSN 0066-1546. JSTOR 3642710.
- Woudhuizen, Fred C. (2020). "On the status of Tawagalawas and the dating of the letter named after him". Talanta, Proceedings of the Dutch Archaeological and Historical Society. 52: 105–119. ISSN 0165-2486.
