= Apaliunas =

Protective deity of Wilusa

- Gender: male
- Region: Wilusa

Equivalents
- Etruscan: Apulu
- Greek: Apollo
- Roman: Apollo

Apaliunas (Hittite: 𒀀𒀊𒉺𒇷𒌋𒈾𒀸 Āppaliunāš) is the name of a god, attested in a Hittite language treaty as a protective deity of Wilusa. Apaliunas is considered to be the Hittite reflex of *Apeljōn, an early form of the name Apollo, which may also be surmised from comparison of Cypriot Ἀπείλων (Apeílōn) with Doric Ἀπέλλων (Apéllōn).

Apaliunas is among the gods who guarantee a treaty drawn up about 1280 BCE between Alaksandu of Wilusa, interpreted as "Alexander of Ilios" and the great Hittite king, Muwatalli II. He is one of the three deities named on the side of the city. In Homer, Apollo is the builder of the walls of Ilium, a god on the Trojan side. A Luwian etymology suggested for Apaliunas makes Apollo "The One of Entrapment", perhaps in the sense of "Hunter".

== Sources ==
- Latacz, Joachim, 2001. Troia und Homer: Der Weg zur Lösung eines alten Rätsels. (Munich)
- Korfmann, Manfred, "Stelen auf den Toren Toias: Apaliunas – Apollon in Truisa – Wilusa?,” in Güven Arsebük, M. Mellink, and W. Schirmer (eds.), Light on Top of the Black Hill. Festschrift für Halet Cambel (Istanbul) 1998:471-78. Stel outside the supposed gates of Troy.
