= Kikkuli =

Hurrian author of an ancient Anatolian cuneiform text

Kikkuli (fl. c. 1400 BC) was the Hurrian "master horse trainer [assussanni] of the land of Mitanni" (^{LÚ}A-AŠ-ŠU-UŠ-ŠA-AN-NI ŠA KUR ^{URU}MI-IT-TA-AN-NI) and author of a chariot horse training text written primarily in Hittite (as well as an Old Indo-Aryan language as seen in numerals and loan-words), dating to the Hittite New Kingdom. The text is notable both for the information it provides about the development of Hittite, an Indo-European language, Hurrian, and for its content. The text was inscribed on cuneiform tablets discovered during excavations of Boğazkale and Ḫattuša in 1906 and 1907.

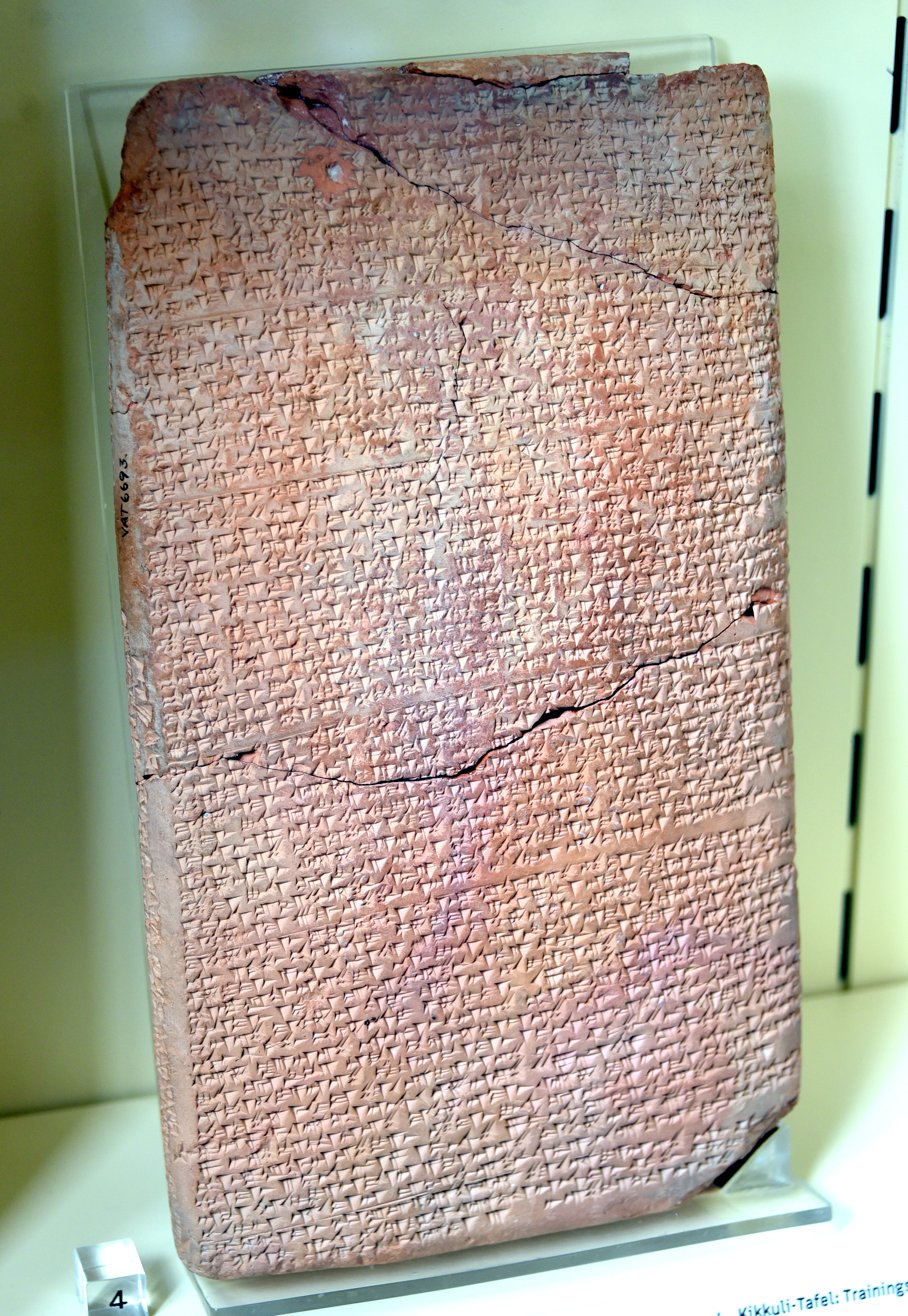
Kikkuli text. Clay tablet, a training program for chariot horses. Purchase 1909, provenance unknown. Around 1400 BC. Vorderasiatisches Museum, Berlin, VAT 6693.

== Content and influence ==
"Thus speaks Kikkuli, master horse trainer of the land of Mitanni" (UM.MA Ki-ik-ku-li ^{LÚ}A-AŠ-ŠU-UŠ-ŠA-AN-NI ŠA KUR ^{URU}MI-IT-TA-AN-NI).

Thus begins Kikkuli's text. The text contains a complete prescription for conditioning (exercise and feeding) Hittite war horses over 214 days.

The Kikkuli Text addresses solely the conditioning, not education, of the horse. The Mitannians were acknowledged leaders in horse training and as a result of the horse training techniques learned from Kikkuli, Hittite charioteers forged an empire of the area which is now Turkey, Syria, Lebanon and Northern Iraq. Surprisingly, the regime used 'interval training' techniques similar to those used so successfully by eventers, endurance riders and others today and whose principles have only been studied by equine sports medicine researchers in the past 30 years. The Kikkuli programme involved "sports medicine" techniques comparable to modern ideas such as the principle of progression, peak loading systems, electrolyte replacement theory, fartlek training, intervals and repetitions. It was directed at horses with a high proportion of slow-twitch muscle fibres.

As in modern conventional (as opposed to 'interval') training, the Kikkuli horses were stabled, rubbed, washed down with warm water and fed oats, barley and hay at least three times per day. Unlike conventional horse training, the horses were subject to warming down periods. Further, every example of cantering included intermediate pauses to relax the horse partially and as the training advanced the workouts include intervals at the canter. This is on the same level as the Interval training we use in modern times. However, Kikkuli made much use of long periods leading the horses at the trotting and cantering gaits rather than harnessing them to a chariot.

Between 1991 and 1992, Dr A. Nyland, then of the University of New England, Australia, carried out the experimental replication of the entire Kikkuli Text over the 7-month period prescribed in the text with Arabian horses. The results are published in "The Kikkuli Method of Horse Fitness Training," in which Nyland claims Kikkuli's methods to be, in some ways, superior to its modern counterparts.

== Surviving texts ==
1. CTH 284, best preserved, Late Hittite copy (13th century BC)
2. CTH 285, contemporary Middle Hittite copy with a ritual introduction
3. CTH 286, contemporary Middle Hittite copy

CTH 284 consists of four well preserved tablets or a total of 1,080 lines. The text is notable for its Mitanni (Indo-Aryan) loanwords, e.g. the numeral compounds aika-, tera-, panza-, satta-, nāwa-wartanna 'one, three, five, seven, nine intervals', Kikkuli apparently was faced with some difficulty getting specific Mitannian concepts across in the Hittite language, for he frequently gives a term such as "intervals" in his own language and then states, "this means..." and explained it in Hittite. An alternative explanation is that at the time the treatise was written these terms were no longer in general use but were employed out of tradition, hence needing a gloss.

== See also ==
- On Horsemanship (Xenophon)
- Amarna letters

== Literature ==
- A. Kammenhuber, Hippologia hethitica (1962) ISBN 9783447004978
- E. Masson, L’art de soigner et d’entrainer les chevaux, texte Hittite du maitre écuyer Kikkuli (Lausanne: Favre, 1998) 43–108
- Ann Nyland, The Kikkuli Method of Horse Training, Kikkuli Research, Armidale, 1993. ISBN 9780646131603
- Ann Nyland, The Kikkuli Method of Horse Training: 2009 Revised Edition, Maryannu Press, Sydney, 2009. ISBN 9780980443073
- Peter Raulwing, "Zur etymologischen Beurteilung der Berufsbezeichnung assussanni des Pferdetrainers Kikkuli von Mittani", Anreiter et al. (eds.), Man and the Animal World, Studies in Archaeozoology, Archaeology, Anthropology and Paleolinguistics in memoriam S. Bökönyi, Budapest (1996), 1-57. (in German)
- Raulwing, Peter. 2005. The Kikkuli text: Hittite training instructions for chariot horses in the second half of the 2nd millennium B.C. and their interdisciplinary context. Les équidés dans le monde méditerranéen antique: Actes du colloque organisé References 1029 par l’École française d’Athènes, le Centre Camille Jullian, et l’UMR 5140 du CNRS, Athènes, 26–28 Novembre 2003, ed. by Armelle Gardeisen, 61–75. Lattes: Association pour le développement de l’archéologie en Languedoc-Rousillon.
- Frank Starke, Ausbildung und Training von Streitwagenpferden, eine hippologisch orientierte Interpretation des Kikkuli-Textes, StBoT 41 (1995). (in German)
