= Meropis =

Fictional island in the writings of Theopompus of Chios

- 'Philippica' location
- Created by: Theopompus of Chios
- Genre: Parody

In-universe information
- Type: Fictional island
- Race: Méropes
- Locations: Eusebes, Machimos, Anostos

Meropis (Ancient Greek: Μεροπίς) is a fictional island mentioned by ancient Greek writer Theopompus of Chios in his work Philippica, which is only fragmentarily maintained via mentions by Aelian.

== Background ==
The story of Meropis is neither a utopia nor a political allegory; it is a parody of Plato's Atlantis, in a similar vein to the True History which parodied Homer's Odyssey. Theopompos somewhat overstates many of Plato's aspects of the Atlantis myth. While it is an Egyptian priest who is telling Solon the story of Atlantis according to Plato's Timaeus, it is an ipotane (a mythical half-man half-horse creature) who is telling the Meropis story to King Midas according to Theopompus's Philippica. Although Atlantis was incredibly big by Plato's account, Theopompus describes Meropis as even bigger, to make it completely absurd. Also, while the invading Atlanteans were beaten by Athens due to its perfect society, the Méropes (Μέροπες)—attacking with an army of ten million soldiers—attempt to conquer Hyperborea, but return in disgrace after realizing that the Hyperboreans were the luckiest people on earth and not worth looting.

It has also been suggested that the story was meant as a criticism of Philipp II.

While most describe Meropis as a fictional island, for a different point of view see Emil Forrer who considered the island might have been real. Meropis is also one of historical names of the Greek island of Kos, ruled by Merops.

== Geography ==
Meropis is situated beyond the world-ocean (Oceanus). Its inhabitants, the Méropes, are twice as tall as other human beings and live twice as long. Theopompos describes three cities in Meropis: Anostos (Ἄνοστος, "Place of No Return"), Eusebes (Εὐσεβής, "Pious-Town") and Machimos (Μάχιμος, "Fighting-Town"). While the inhabitants of Eusebes are living in opulence getting neither hungry nor sick, the inhabitants of Machimos are in fact born with weapons and carry on wars steadily. The third city, Anostos, is situated on the outermost border of Meropis. It resembles a yawning abyss, does not have day or night, and is covered by cloudy, red fumes.
