= Luwian language =

Ancient Indo-European language of the Hittite Empire

Luwian
- Luvian
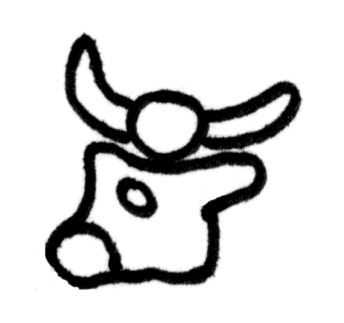
- Luwian hieroglyph BOS (cow)
- Native to: Hittite Empire, Arzawa, Neo-Hittite kingdoms
- Region: Anatolia (Turkey), Northern Syria
- Ethnicity: Luwians
- Extinct: around 600 BC
- Language family: Indo-European: Anatolian; Luwo-Lydian; Luwo-Palaic; Luwic; Luwian
- Early forms: Proto-Indo-European: Proto-Anatolian
- Writing system: Cuneiform; Anatolian hieroglyphs

Language codes
- ISO 639-3: Either: xlu – Cuneiform Luwian hlu – Hieroglyphic Luwian
- Glottolog: luvi1235
- Distribution of the Luwian language

Luwian (/ˈluːwiən/ LOO-wee-ən), sometimes known as Luvian, is an ancient language, or group of languages, within the Anatolian branch of the Indo-European language family. The ethnonym Luwian comes from Luwiya (also spelled Luwia or Luvia) – the name of the region in which the Luwians lived. Luwiya is attested, for example, in the Hittite laws.

The two varieties of Luwian are known after the scripts in which they were written: Cuneiform Luwian (CLuwian) and Hieroglyphic Luwian (HLuwian). There is no consensus as to whether these were a single language or two closely related languages.

== Classification ==
Several other Anatolian languages – particularly Carian, Lycian, and Milyan (also known as Lycian B or Lycian II) – are now usually identified as related to Luwian – and as mutually connected more closely than other constituents of the Anatolian branch. This suggests that these languages formed a sub-branch within Anatolian. Some linguists follow Craig Melchert in referring to this broader group as Luwic, whereas others refer to the "Luwian group" (and, in that sense, "Luwian" may mean several distinct languages). Likewise, Proto-Luwian may mean the common ancestor of the whole group, or just the ancestor of Luwian (normally, under tree-naming conventions, were the branch to be called Luwic, its ancestor should be known as Proto-Luwic or Common Luwic; in practice, such names are seldom used). Luwic or Luwian (in the broad sense of the term) is one of three major sub-branches of Anatolian, alongside Hittite and Palaic.

As Luwian has numerous archaisms, it is regarded as important to the study of Indo-European languages (IE) in general, the other Anatolian languages, and the Bronze Age Aegean. These archaisms are often regarded as supporting the view that the Proto-Indo-European language (PIE) had three distinct sets of velar consonants: plain velars, palatovelars, and labiovelars. For Melchert, PIE *ḱ → Luwian z (probably [ts]); *k → k; and *kʷ → ku (probably [kʷ]). Luwian has also been enlisted for its verb kalut(t)i(ya)-, which means "make the rounds of" and is probably derived from *kalutta/i- "circle". It has been argued that this derives from a proto-Anatolian word for "wheel", which in turn would have derived from the common word for "wheel" found in all other Indo-European families. The wheel was invented in the 5th millennium BC and, if kaluti does derive from it, then the Anatolian branch left PIE after its invention (so validating the Kurgan hypothesis as applicable to Anatolian). However, kaluti need not imply a wheel, and so need not have been derived from a PIE word with that meaning; the words for a wheel in other IE languages may well have arisen after the Anatolian split.

== Geographic and chronological distribution ==
Luwian was among the languages spoken during the 2nd and 1st millennia BC by groups in central and western Anatolia and northern Syria. The earliest Luwian texts in cuneiform transmission are attested in connection with the Kingdom of Kizzuwatna in southeastern Anatolia, as well as a number of locations in central Anatolia. Beginning in the 14th century BC, Luwian speakers came to constitute the majority in the Hittite capital Hattusa. It appears that by the time of the collapse of the Hittite Empire ca. 1180 BC, the Hittite king and royal family were fully bilingual in Luwian. Long after the extinction of the Hittite language, Luwian continued to be spoken in the Neo-Hittite states of Syria, such as Milid and Carchemish, as well as in the central Anatolian kingdom of Tabal that flourished in the 8th century BC.

A number of scholars in the past attempted to argue for the Luwian homeland in western Anatolia. According to James Mellaart, the earliest Indo-Europeans in northwest Anatolia were the horse-riders who came to this region from the north and founded Demircihöyük (Eskişehir Province) in Phrygia c. 3000 BC. They were allegedly ancestors of the Luwians who inhabited Troy II, and spread widely in the Anatolian peninsula. He cited the distribution of a new type of wheel-made pottery, Red Slip Wares, as some of the best evidence for his theory. According to Mellaart, the proto-Luwian migrations to Anatolia came in several distinct waves over many centuries. The recent detailed review of Mellaart's claims suggests that his ethnolinguistic conclusions cannot be substantiated on archaeological grounds.

Other arguments were advanced for the extensive Luwian presence in western Anatolia in the late second millennium BC. In the Old Hittite version of the Hittite Code, some, if not all, of the Luwian-speaking areas were called Luwiya. Widmer (2007) has argued that the Mycenaean term ru-wa-ni-jo, attested in Linear B, refers to the same area. but the stem *Luwan- was recently shown to be non-existent. In a corrupt late copy of the Hittite Code the geographical term Luwiya is replaced with Arzawa a western Anatolian kingdom corresponding roughly with Mira and the Seha River Land. Therefore, several scholars shared the view that Luwian was spoken—to varying degrees—across a large portion of western Anatolia, including Troy (Wilusa), the Seha River Land (Sēḫa ~ Sēḫariya, i.e., the Greek Hermos river and Kaikos valley), and the Mira-Kuwaliya kingdom with its core being the Maeander valley. In a number of recent publications, however, the geographic identity between Luwiya and Arzawa has been rejected or doubted. In the post-Hittite era, the region of Arzawa came to be known as Lydia (Assyrian Luddu, Greek Λυδία), where the Lydian language was in use. The name Lydia has been derived from the name Luwiya (Lydian *lūda- < *luw(i)da- < luwiya-, with regular Lydian sound change y > d). The Lydian language, however, cannot be regarded as the direct descendant of Luwian and probably does not even belong to the Luwic group (see Anatolian languages). Therefore, none of the arguments in favour of the Luwian linguistic dominance in Western Asia Minor can be regarded as compelling, although the issue continues to be debated.

== Script and dialects ==
Luwian was split into many dialects, which were written in two different writing systems. One of these was the Cuneiform Luwian which used the form of Old Babylonian cuneiform that had been adapted for the Hittite language. The other was Hieroglyphic Luwian, which was written in a unique native hieroglyphic script. The differences between the dialects are minor, but they affect vocabulary, style, and grammar. The different orthographies of the two writing systems may also hide some differences.

According to Hittitologist Alwin Kloekhorst, Hieroglyphic Luwian may also be known as Empire Luwian or Iron Age Luwian, and is "closely related" to Cuneiform Luwian. Similarly, Alice Mouton and Ilya Yakubovich separate Luwian into two distinct varieties: cuneiform and hieroglyphic – the latter of a more prestigious and elite use.

=== Cuneiform Luwian ===
Cuneiform Luwian
- Kizzuwatna Luwian
- luwili
- Region: Anatolia
- Ethnicity: Luwians
- Extinct: around 600 BC
- Language family: Indo-European: Anatolian; Luwo-Lydian; Luwo-Palaic; Luwic; Luwian; Cuneiform Luwian
- Early forms: Proto-Indo-European: Proto-Anatolian
- Writing system: Cuneiform

Language codes
- ISO 639-3: xlu
- Linguist List: xlu
- Glottolog: cune1239

Cuneiform Luwian (or Kizzuwatna Luwian) is the corpus of Luwian texts attested in the tablet archives of Hattusa; it is essentially the same cuneiform writing system used in Hittite. In Laroche's Catalog of Hittite Texts, the corpus of Hittite cuneiform texts with Luwian insertions runs from CTH 757–773, mostly comprising rituals. Cuneiform Luwian texts are written in several dialects, of which the most easily identifiable are Kizzuwatna Luwian, Ištanuwa Luwian, and Empire Luwian. The last dialect represents the vernacular of Hattusan scribes of the 14th–13th centuries BC and is mainly attested through Glossenkeil words in Hittite texts.

Compared to cuneiform Hittite, logograms (signs with a set symbolic value) are rare. Instead, most writing is done with the syllabic characters, where a single symbol stands for a vowel, or a consonant-vowel pair (either VC or CV). A striking feature is the consistent use of 'full-writing' to indicate long vowels, even at the beginning of words. In this system a long vowel is indicated by writing it twice. For example, īdi "he goes" is written i-i-ti rather than i-ti, and ānda "in" is written a-an-ta rather than an-ta.

=== Hieroglyphic Luwian ===
Hieroglyphic Luwian
- luwili
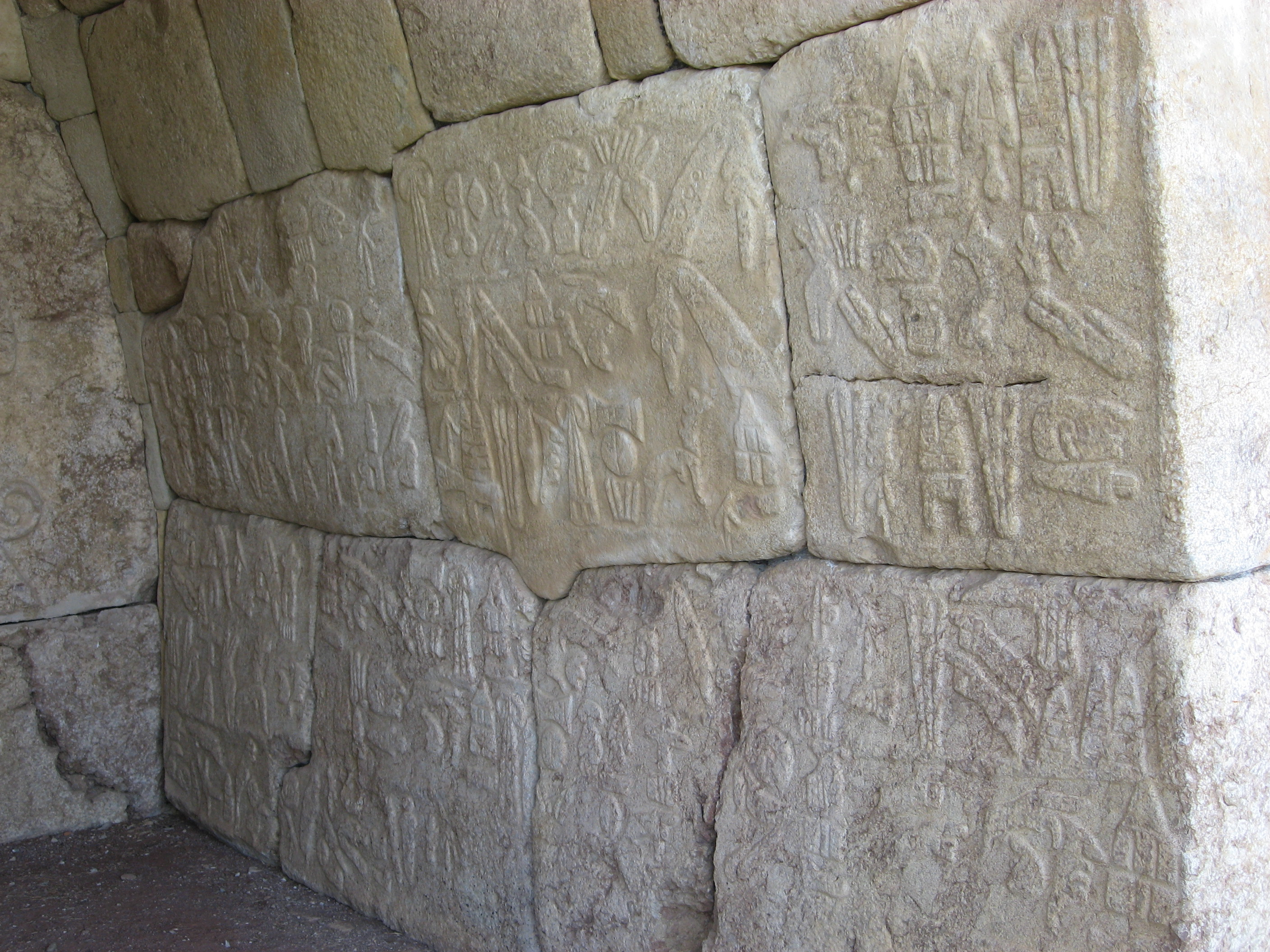
- Luwian hieroglyphs at Hattusa
- Region: Anatolia
- Ethnicity: Luwians
- Extinct: around 600 BC
- Language family: Indo-European: Anatolian; Luwo-Lydian; Luwo-Palaic; Luwic; Luwian; Hieroglyphic Luwian
- Early forms: Proto-Indo-European: Proto-Anatolian
- Writing system: Anatolian hieroglyphs

Language codes
- ISO 639-3: hlu
- Linguist List: hlu
- Glottolog: hier1240

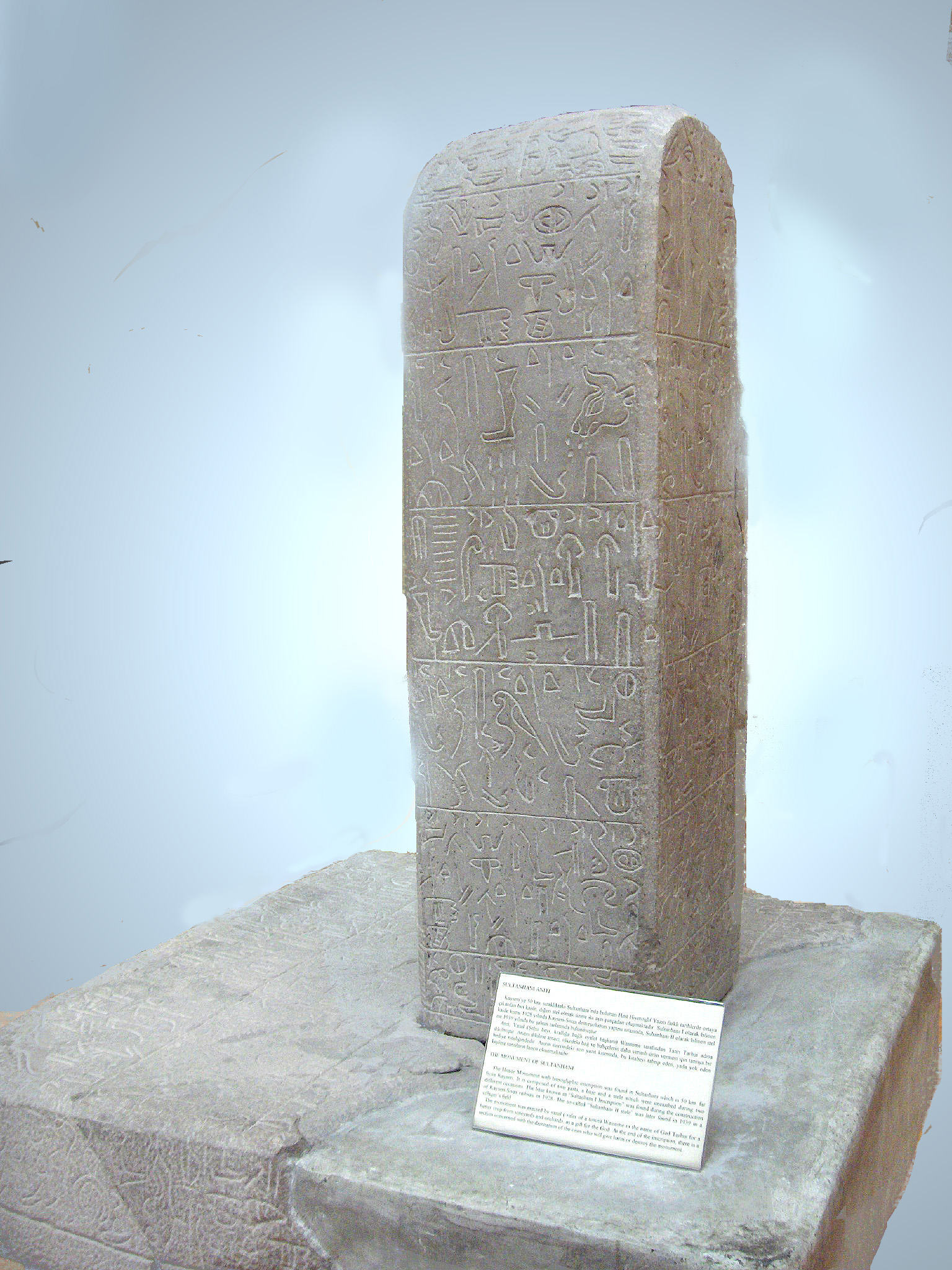
Stele of Sultanhan, Museum of Anatolian Civilizations, Ankara

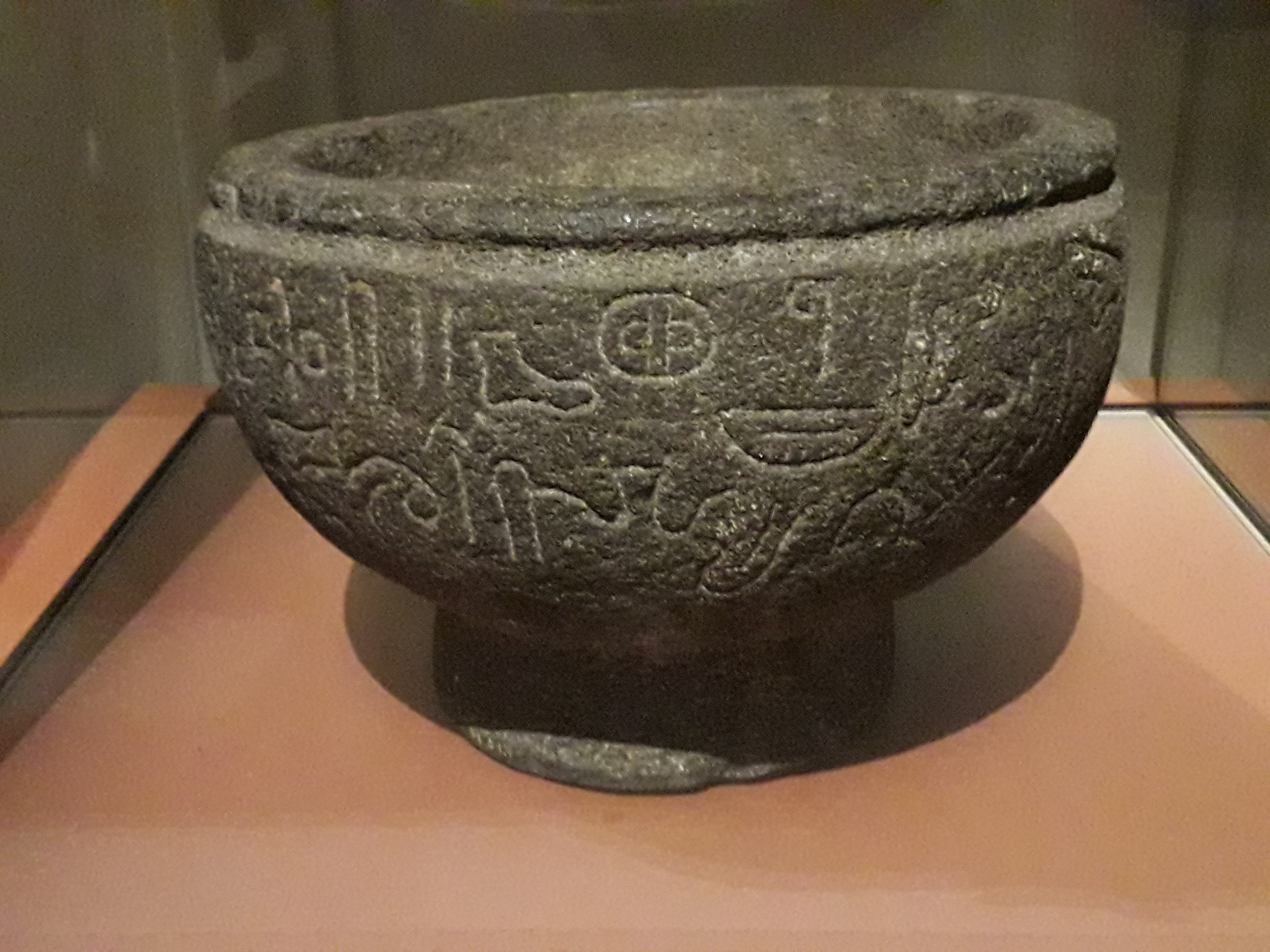
Basalt bowl with engraved inscription in Luwian hieroglyphics found in Babylon, southern Iraq, in the 1880s and now in the collection of the British Museum

Hieroglyphic Luwian (luwili) is the corpus of Luwian texts written in a native script, known as Anatolian hieroglyphs. It is recorded in official and royal seals and a small number of monumental inscriptions. It was once thought to be a variety of the Hittite language, and the term "Hieroglyphic Hittite" was formerly used to refer to the language of the same inscriptions, but this term is now obsolete. The dialect of Luwian hieroglyphic inscriptions appears to be either Empire Luwian or its descendant, Iron Age Luwian.

The earliest hieroglyphs appear on official and royal seals, dating from the early 2nd millennium BC, but only from the 14th century BC is the unequivocal evidence for a full-fledged writing system. Dutch Hittitologist Willemijn Waal has argued that Luwian Hieroglyphic was already used for writing on wooden writing boards from the early second millennium BC onwards, but the argument has not been widely accepted. The first monumental inscriptions confirmed as Luwian date to the Late Bronze Age, c. 14th to 13th centuries BC. After some two centuries of sparse material, the hieroglyphs resume in the Early Iron Age, c. 10th to 8th centuries BC. In the early 7th century BC, the Luwian hieroglyphic script, by then aged more than 700 years, falls into oblivion.

The first report of a monumental inscription dates to 1850, when an inhabitant of Nevşehir reported the relief at Fraktin. In 1870, antiquarian travellers in Aleppo found another inscription built into the south wall of the Al-Qaiqan Mosque. In 1884, Polish scholar Marian Sokołowski discovered an inscription near Köylütolu, in western Turkey. The largest known inscription was excavated in 1946 in Karatepe. Luwian hieroglyphic texts contain a limited number of lexical borrowings from Hittite, Akkadian, and Northwest Semitic; the lexical borrowings from Greek are limited to proper nouns, although common nouns borrowed in the opposite direction do exist.

A decipherment was presented by Emmanuel Laroche in 1960, building on partial decipherments proposed since the 1930s. Corrections to the readings of certain signs as well as other clarifications were given by David Hawkins, Anna Morpurgo Davies and Günther Neumann in 1973, generally referred to as "the new readings".

==== Script ====
A more elaborate monumental style is distinguished from more abstract linear or cursive forms of the script. In general, relief inscriptions prefer monumental forms, and incised ones prefer the linear form, but the styles are in principle interchangeable. Texts of several lines are usually written in boustrophedon style. Within a line, signs are usually written in vertical columns, but as in Egyptian hieroglyphs, aesthetic considerations take precedence over correct reading order.

The script consists of the order of 500 unique signs, some with multiple values; a given sign may function as a logogram, a determinative or a syllabogram, or a combination thereof. The signs are numbered according to Laroche's sign list, with a prefix of 'L.' or '*'. Logograms are transcribed in Latin in capital letters. For example, *90, an image of a foot, is transcribed as PES when used logographically, and with its phonemic value ti when used as a syllabogram. In the rare cases where the logogram cannot be transliterated into Latin, it is rendered through its approximate Hittite equivalent, recorded in Italic capitals, e.g. *216 ARHA. The most up-to-date sign list is that of Marazzi (1998).

Hawkins, Morpurgo-Davies and Neumann corrected some previous errors about sign values, in particular emending the reading of symbols *376 and *377 from i, ī to zi, za.

Roster of CV syllabograms:
	-a	-i	-u
-	*450, *19	*209	*105
h-	*215, *196	*413	*307
k-	*434	*446	*423
l-	*176	*278	*445
m-	*110	*391	*107
n-	*35	*411, *214	*153, *395
p-	*334	*66	*328
r-	*383		*412
s-	*415 *433, *104, *402, *327	-	-
t-	*100, *29, *41, *319, *172	*90	*89, *325
w-	*439		-
y-	*210	-	-
z-	*377	*376	*432(?)

Some signs are used as reading aids, marking the beginning of a word, the end of a word, or identifying a sign as a logogram. These are not mandatory and are used inconsistently.

== Phonology ==
The reconstruction of the Luwian phoneme inventory is based mainly on the written texts and comparisons with the known development of other Indo-European languages. Two series of stops can be identified, one transliterated as geminate in the cuneiform script. These fortis and lenis stops may have been distinguished by either voicing or gemination. The contrast was lost initially and finally, suggesting that any voicing only appeared intervocalically.

The following table provides a minimal consonant inventory, as can be reconstructed from the script. The existence of other consonants, which were not differentiated in writing, is possible.

		Bilabial	Alveolar	Palatal	Velar	Uvular
Nasal	fortis	*m: ⟨mm⟩	*n: ⟨nn⟩			
Nasal	lenis	*m ⟨m⟩	*n ⟨n⟩			
Plosive	fortis	*p ⟨pp⟩	*t ⟨tt⟩		*k ⟨kk⟩	
Plosive	lenis	*b ⟨p⟩	*d ⟨t⟩		*ɡ ⟨k⟩	
Fricative	fortis		*s ⟨šš⟩		*x~χ ⟨ḫḫ⟩	
Fricative	lenis		*z ⟨š⟩		*ɣ~ʁ ⟨ḫ⟩	
Affricate	fortis		*t͡s ⟨zz⟩			
Affricate	lenis		*d͡z ⟨z⟩			
Trill			*r			
Approximant		*w	*l	*j		

There are only three vowels, a, i, and u, which could be short or long. Vowel length is not stable but changes with the stress and word position. For example, annan occurs alone as an adverb as ānnan ('underneath') but as a preposition, it becomes annān pātanza ('under the feet').

The characters that are transliterated as -h- and -hh- have often been interpreted as pharyngeal fricatives [ħ] and [ʕ]. However, they may have instead been uvular [χ] and [ʁ] or velar fricatives [x] and [ɣ]. In loans to Ugaritic, these sounds are transcribed with <ḫ> and <ġ>, while in Egyptian they are transcribed with 𓐍 ḫ and 𓎼 g. As both of these languages had pharyngeal consonants, the Luwian sounds are unlikely to have been pharyngeal.

In transcriptions of Luwian cuneiform, š is traditionally distinguished from s, since they were originally distinct signs for two different sounds, but in Luwian, both signs probably represented the same s sound.

A noteworthy phonological development in Luwian is rhotacism; in some cases, d, l, and n become r. For example, *īdi ('he gets') becomes īri and wala- ('die') becomes wara-. Additionally, a d in word final position can be dropped, and an s may be added between two dental consonants and so *ad-tuwari becomes aztuwari ('you all eat') (ds and z are phonetically identical).

== Morphology ==
=== Nouns ===
There were two grammatical genders: animate and inanimate/neuter. There are two grammatical numbers: singular and plural. Some animate nouns could also take a collective plural in addition to the regular numerical plural.

Luwian had six cases:

1. nominative
2. genitive
3. dative/locative
4. accusative
5. ablative/instrumental
6. vocative

The vocative case occurs rarely in surviving texts and only in the singular.

Case	Singular	Plural
Nominative animate	-s	-anzi, -inzi
Accusative animate	-n, -an	-anzi, -inzi
Nominative/accusative inanimate	-Ø, -n	-a, -aya
Genitive	-s, -si	–
Dative/locative	-i, -iya, -a	-anza
Ablative/instrumental	-ati	

In the animate gender, an -i- is inserted between the stem and the case ending. In hieroglyphic Luwian, the particle -sa/-za is added to the nominative/accusative inanimate case ending. In the genitive case, cuneiform and hieroglyphic Luwian differ sharply from each other. In cuneiform Luwian the possessive suffix -assa is used for the genitive singular and -assanz- is used for the genitive plural. In hieroglyphic Luwian, as in Hittite, the classical Indo-European suffixes -as for the genitive singular and -an for the plural are used. The special form of possessive adjectives with a plural possessor is restricted to Kizzuwatna Luwian and probably represents a calque from Hurrian.

Because of the prevalence of -assa place names and words scattered around all sides of the Aegean Sea, the possessive suffix was sometimes considered evidence of a shared non-Indo-European language or an Aegean Sprachbund preceding the arrivals of Luwians and Greeks. It is, however, possible to account for the Luwian possessive construction as a result of case attraction in the Indo-European noun phrase.

=== Adjective ===
Case	Singular	Plural
Nominative animate	-asis	-asinzi
Accusative animate	-asin	-asinzi
Nominative/accusative inanimate	-asanza	-asa
Dative/locative	-asan	-asanza
Ablative/instrumental	-asati	

Adjectives agree with nouns in number and gender. Forms for the nominative and the accusative differ only in the animate gender and even then, only in the singular. For the sake of clarity, the table includes only the endings beginning with -a, but endings can also begin with an -i. The forms are largely derived from the forms of the nominal declension, with an -as- before the case ending that would be expected for nouns.

=== Pronouns ===
In addition to personal pronouns typical of Anatolian languages, Luwian also has demonstrative pronouns which are formed from apa- and za-/zi-. The case endings are similar to those of Hittite, but not all cases are attested for personal pronouns. In the third person, the demonstrative pronoun apa- occurs instead of the personal pronoun.

		Personal pronouns		Possessive pronouns
		independent	enclitic	independent
1st person	singular	amu, mu	-mu, -mi	ama-
1st person	plural	anzas, anza	-anza	anza-
2nd person	singular	tu, ti	-tu, -ti	tuwa-
2nd person	plural	unzas, unza	-manza	unza-
3rd person	singular	(apa-)	-as, -ata, -an, -du	apasa-
3rd person	plural	(apa-)	-ata, -manza	apasa-

Possessive pronouns and demonstrative pronouns in apa- are declined as adjectives. All known forms of the personal pronouns are given, but it is not clear how their meanings differed or how they changed for different cases.

In addition to the forms given in the table, Luwian also had a demonstrative pronoun formed from the stem za-/zi-, but not all cases are known, and also a relative pronoun, which was declined regularly: kwis (nominative singular animate), kwin (accusative singular animate), kwinzi (nominative/accusative plural animate), kwati (ablative/instrumental singular), kwanza (dative/locative plural), kwaya (nominative/accusative plural inanimate). Some indefinite pronouns whose meanings are not entirely clear are also transmitted.

=== Verbs ===
Like many other Indo-European languages, Luwian distinguishes two numbers (singular and plural) and three persons. There are two moods: indicative and imperative but no subjunctive. There are two tenses: the present, which is used to express future events as well, and the preterite.

The following active voice endings have been attested:

		Present	Preterite	Imperative
1st person	singular	-wi	-ha	–
1st person	plural	-min(a)	-han(a)	–
2nd person	singular	-si, -tis(a)	-ta	Ø
2nd person	plural	-tani	-tan	-tanu
3rd person	singular	-ti(r), -i, -ia	-ta(r)	-tu(r)
3rd person	plural	-nti	-nta	-ntu

The conjugation is very similar to the Hittite ḫḫi conjugation.

For the mediopassive, the following endings are attested:

		Present
2nd person	singular	
2nd person	plural	-ttuwar(i)
3rd person	singular	-ar(i), -t(t)ari
3rd person	plural	-antari

A single participle can be formed with the suffix -a(i)mma. It has a passive sense for transitive verbs and a stative sense for intransitive verbs. The infinitive ends in -una.

== Syntax ==
The usual word order is subject-object-verb, but words can be moved to the front of the sentence for stress or to start a clause. Relative clauses are normally before the antecedent, but they sometimes follow the antecedent. Dependent words and adjectives are normally before their head word. Enclitic particles are often attached to the first word or conjunction.

Various conjunctions with temporal or conditional meaning are used to link clauses. There is no coordinating conjunction, but main clauses can be coordinated with the enclitic -ha, which is attached to the first word of the following clause. In narratives, clauses are linked by using the prosecutive conjunctions: a- before the first word of the following clause means 'and then', and pā, can be an independent conjunction at the start of a clause and the enclitic -pa indicates contrast or a change of theme.

The following example sentence demonstrates several common features of Luwian: a final verb, the particle chain headed by the conjunction a-, the quotative clitic -wa, and the preverb sarra adding directionality to the main verb awiha.

a=wa api-n wattaniy-ati pihammi-s sarra awi-ha
and=QUOT DEM-ABL land-ABL.PL glorified-NOM over come-1.SG
"And I came over glorified from those lands." (Karkamiš A11b+c, line 14)

== Vocabulary and texts ==
The known Luwian vocabulary consists mostly of words inherited from Proto-Indo-European. Loan words for various technical and religious concepts derive mainly from Hurrian, and were often subsequently passed on through Luwian to Hittite.

The surviving corpus of Luwian texts consists principally of cuneiform ritual texts from the 16th and 15th centuries BC and monumental inscriptions in hieroglyphs. There are also some letters and economic documents. The majority of the hieroglyphic inscriptions derive from the 12th to 7th centuries BC, after the fall of the Hittite empire.

Another source of Luwian are the hieroglyphic seals which date from the 16th to the 7th centuries BC. Seals from the time of the Hittite empire are often digraphic, written in both cuneiform and hieroglyphics. However, the seals nearly always are limited to logograms. The absence of the syllabic symbols from the seals makes it impossible to determine the pronunciation of names and titles that appear on them, or even to make a certain attribution of the text to a specific language.

== History of research ==
After the decipherment of Hittite, Cuneiform Luwian was recognised as a separate, but related language by Emil Forrer in 1919. Further progress in the understanding of the language came after the Second World War, with the publication and analysis of a larger number of texts. Important work in this period was produced by Bernhard Rosenkranz, Heinrich Otten and Emmanuel Laroche. An important advance came in 1985 with the reorganisation of the whole text-corpus by Frank Starke.

The decipherment and classification of Hieroglyphic Luwian was much more difficult. In the 1920s, there were a number of failed attempts. In the 1930s some individual logograms and syllabic signs were correctly identified. At this point the classification of the language was not yet clear and, since it was believed to be a form of Hittite, it was referred to as Hieroglyphic Hittite. After a break in research due to the Second World War, there was breakthrough in 1947 with the discovery and publication of a Phoenician-Hieroglyphic Luwian bilingual text by Helmuth Theodor Bossert. The reading of several syllabic signs was still faulty, however, and as a result it was not realised that the cuneiform and hieroglyphic texts recorded the same language.

In the 1970s, as a result of a fundamental revision of the readings of a large number of hieroglyphs by John David Hawkins, Anna Morpurgo Davies, and Günter Neumann, it became clear that both cuneiform and hieroglyphic texts recorded the same Luwian language. This revision resulted from a discovery outside the area of Luwian settlement, namely the annotations on Urartian pots, written in the Urartian language using the hieroglyphic Luwian script. The sign, which had hitherto been read as ī was shown to be being used to indicate the sound za, which triggered a chain reaction resulting in an entirely new system of readings. Since that time, research has concentrated on better understanding the relationship between the two different forms of Luwian, in order to gain a clearer understanding of Luwian as a whole.

== Trojan hypothesis ==
Luwian has been deduced as one of the likely candidates for the language spoken by the Trojans.

After the 1995 finding of a Luwian biconvex seal at Troy VII, there has been a heated discussion over the language that was spoken in Homeric Troy. Frank Starke of the University of Tübingen demonstrated that the name of Priam, king of Troy at the time of the Trojan War, is connected to the Luwian compound Priimuua, which means "exceptionally courageous". "The certainty is growing that Wilusa/Troy belonged to the greater Luwian-speaking community," but it is not entirely clear whether Luwian was primarily the official language or if it was in daily colloquial use.

== See also ==
- Pre-Greek substrate

== Sources ==
- Beekes, R. S. P. "Luwians and Lydians", Kadmos 42 (2003): 47–9.
- Forrer, Emil (1932). Die hethitische Bilderschrift. Studies in ancient oriental civilization / Oriental Institute of the University of Chicago, no. 3. Chicago: University of Chicago Press.
- Gander, Max. "Asia, Ionia, Maeonia und Luwiya? Bemerkungen zu den neuen Toponymen aus Kom el-Hettan (Theben-West) mit Exkursen zu Westkleinasien in der Spätbronzezeit". Klio 97/2 (2015): 443–502.
- Gander, Max "The West: Philology". Hittite Landscape and Geography, M. Weeden and L. Z. Ullmann (eds.). Leiden: Brill, 2017. pp. 262–280.
- Hawkins, J. D. "Tarkasnawa King of Mira: 'Tarkendemos', Boğazköy Sealings, and Karabel", Anatolian Studies 48 (1998): 1–31.
- Hawkins, J. D. "The Arzawa letters in recent perspective", British Museum Studies in Ancient Egypt and Sudan 14 (2009): 73–83.
- Hawkins, J. D. "A New Look at the Luwian Language". Kadmos 52/1 (2013): 1–18.
- Laroche, Emil. 1960. Les hiéroglyphes hittites, Première partie, L'écriture. Paris.
- Laroche, Emmanuel. Catalogue des textes hittites. Paris: Klincksieck, 1971.
- Latacz, Joachim (2004). Troy and Homer: Towards a Solution of an Old Mystery. Oxford: Oxford University Press. ISBN 9780199263080.
- Marazzi, M. 1998. Il Geroglifico Anatolico, Sviluppi della ricerca a venti anni dalla "ridecifrazione". Naples.
- Matessi, A. "The Making of Hittite Imperial Landscapes: Territoriality and Balance of Power in South-Central Anatolia during the Late Bronze Age". Journal of Ancient Near Eastern History, AoP (2017).
- Melchert H. Craig. "Greek mólybdos as a loanword from Lydian", in Anatolian Interfaces: Hittites, Greeks and their Neighbours, eds. B. J. Collins et al. Oxford: Oxbow Books, 2008, pp. 153–7.
- Melchert, H. Craig. 'Lycian', in The Ancient Languages of Asia Minor, ed. R. D. Woodard. Cambridge: Cambridge University Press, 2008, pp. 46–55, esp. 46.
- Melchert, H. Craig, ed. (2003a). The Luwians. Boston: Brill. ISBN 90-04-13009-8.
- Melchert, H. Craig. Anatolian Historical Phonology. Amsterdam: Rodopi, 1994.
- Melchert, H. Craig. Cuneiform Luvian Lexicon. Chapel Hill: self-published, 1993.
- Melchert, H. Craig. "PIE velars in Luvian", in Studies in memory of Warren Cowgill (1929–1985): Papers from the Fourth East Coast Indo-European Conference, Cornell University, June 6–9, 1985, ed. C. Watkins. Berlin: Walter de Gruyter, 1987, pp. 182–204.
- Melchert, H. Craig. 1996. "Anatolian Hieroglyphs", in The World's Writing Systems, ed. Peter T. Daniels and William Bright. New York and Oxford: Oxford University Press. ISBN 0-19-507993-0.
- Melchert, Craig (2003). "The Luwian Hieroglyphic Contribution to Anatolian Geography". Anatolica. 29: 1–6. doi:10.2143/ana.29.0.2015509..
- Melchert, H. Craig. 2004. "Luvian". In: The Cambridge Encyclopedia of the World's Ancient Languages. Ed.: Roger D. Woodard. Cambridge: Cambridge University Press. ISBN 0-521-56256-2
- Melchert, H. Craig (2012). "The Position of Anatolian" (PDF).
- Otten, Heinrich. Zur grammatikalischen und lexikalischen Bestimmung des Luvischen. Berlin: Akademie-Verlag, 1953.
- Payne, A. 2004. Hieroglyphic Luwian, Wiesbaden: Harrassowitz.
- Plöchl, R. 2003. Einführung ins Hieroglyphen-Luwische. Dresden.
- Rieken, Elisabeth. "Luwier, Lykier, Lyder—alle vom selben Stamm?", in Die Ausbreitung des Indogermanischen: Thesen aus Sprachwissenschaft, Archäologie und Genetik; Akten der Arbeitstagung der Indogermanischen Gesellschaft, Würzburg, 24–26 September 2009, ed. H. Hettrich & S. Ziegler. Wiesbaden: Reichert, 2012.
- Rosenkranz, Bernhard. Beiträge zur Erforschung des Luvischen. Wiesbaden: Harrassowitz, 1952.
- Sasseville, David. Anatolian Verbal Stem Formation. Leiden / New-York: Brill, 2021.
- Singer, I. 2005. 'On Luwians and Hittites.' Bibliotheca Orientalis 62:430–51. (Review article of Melchert 2003).
- Starke, Frank. 'Troia im Kontext des historisch-politischen und sprachlichen Umfeldes Kleinasiens im 2. Jahrtausend. Studia Troica 7:446–87.
- Starke, Frank. Die keilschrift-luwischen Texte in Umschrift (StBoT 30, 1985)
- Starke, Frank. Untersuchungen zur Stammbildung des keilschrift-luwischen Nomens (StBoT 30, 1990)
- Watkins, C. 1995. How to Kill a Dragon: Aspects of Indo-European Poetics. New York and Oxford.
- Watkins, C.1994. 'The Language of the Trojans.' In Selected Writings, ed. L. Oliver et al., vol. 2. 700–717. Innsbruck. = Troy and the Trojan War. A Symposium held at Bryn Mawr College, October 1984, ed. M. Mellink, 45–62. Bryn Mawr.
- Widmer, P. 2006. 'Mykenisch ru-wa-ni-jo, "Luwier".' Kadmos 45:82–84.
- Woudhuizen, Fred. The Language of the Sea Peoples. Amsterdam: Najade Pres, 1992.
- Woudhuizen, F. C. 2004. Selected Hieroglyphic Texts. Innsbruck. ISBN 3-85124-213-0.
- Woudhuizen, F. C. 2004. Luwian Hieroglyphic Monumental Rock and Stone Inscriptions from the Hittite Empire Period. Innsbruck. ISBN 3-85124-209-2.
- Yakubovich, Ilya. Sociolinguistics of the Luvian Language. Leiden: Brill, 2010
- Yakubovich, Ilya. "The Origin of Luwian Possessive Adjectives". In Proceedings of the 19th Annual UCLA Indo-European Conference, Los Angeles, November 3–4, 2007, ed. K. Jones-Bley et al., Washington: Institute for the Study of Man, 2008.
- Luwian Identities: Culture, Language and Religion between Anatolia and the Aegean. Brill, 2013. ISBN 978-90-04-25279-0 (Hardback) ISBN 978-90-04-25341-4 (e-Book)

=== Inscriptions ===
- Cambel, Halet. Corpus of hieroglyphic Luwian inscriptions. Volume 2: Karatepe-Aslantas - The Inscriptions: Facsimile Edition. Berlin, New York: De Gruyter, 2011 [1999]. https://doi.org/10.1515/9783110879759
- Hawkins, John David. Corpus of Hieroglyphic Luwian Inscriptions. Volume 1: Inscriptions of the Iron Age - Part 1: Text, Introduction, Karatepe, Karkamis, Tell Ahmar, Maras, Malatya, Commagene. Berlin, Boston: De Gruyter, 2012 [2000]. pp. 1-360. https://doi.org/10.1515/9783110804201
- ______. Corpus of Hieroglyphic Luwian Inscriptions. Volume 1: Inscriptions of the Iron Age - Part 2: Text, Amuq, Aleppo, Hama, Tabal, Assur Letters, Miscellaneous, Seals, Indices. Berlin, Boston: De Gruyter, 2012 [2000]. pp. 361-641. https://doi.org/10.1515/9783110804201
- ______. Corpus of Hieroglyphic Luwian Inscriptions. Volume 1: Inscriptions of the Iron Age - Part 3: Plates. Berlin, Boston: De Gruyter, 2012 [2000]. pp. 642-1007. https://doi.org/10.1515/9783110804201
- Hawkins, John David. Corpus of Hieroglyphic Luwian Inscriptions. Volume III: Inscriptions of the Hettite Empire and New Inscriptions of the Iron Age. Walter de Gruyter GmbH & Co KG, 2024. ISBN 9783110778854, doi:10.1515/9783110778854
- Payne, Annick. Iron Age Hieroglyphic Luwian Inscriptions. Writings from the Ancient World 29. Atlanta: Society of Biblical Literature, 2012.
- Peker, Hasan. Texts from Karkemish I: Luwian Hieroglyphic Inscriptions from the 2011–2015 Excavations. OrientLab Series Maior, Vol. 1. Bologna: Ante Quem, 2016. ISBN 978-887849111-3.
