= Hittite military oath =

Ancient Hittite text

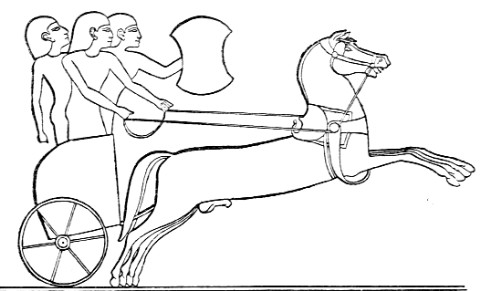
Hittite chariot, from an Egyptian relief

The Hittite military oath (CTH 427) is a Hittite text on two cuneiform tablets.

The first tablet is only preserved in fragments (KBo XXI 10, KUB XL 13, and minor fragments), the second tablet survives in three copies, and can be restituted almost completely. The oldest copy (KUB XL 13) is fragmentary, but two younger copies (KUB XL 16, KBo VI 34) are well preserved.

== Description ==
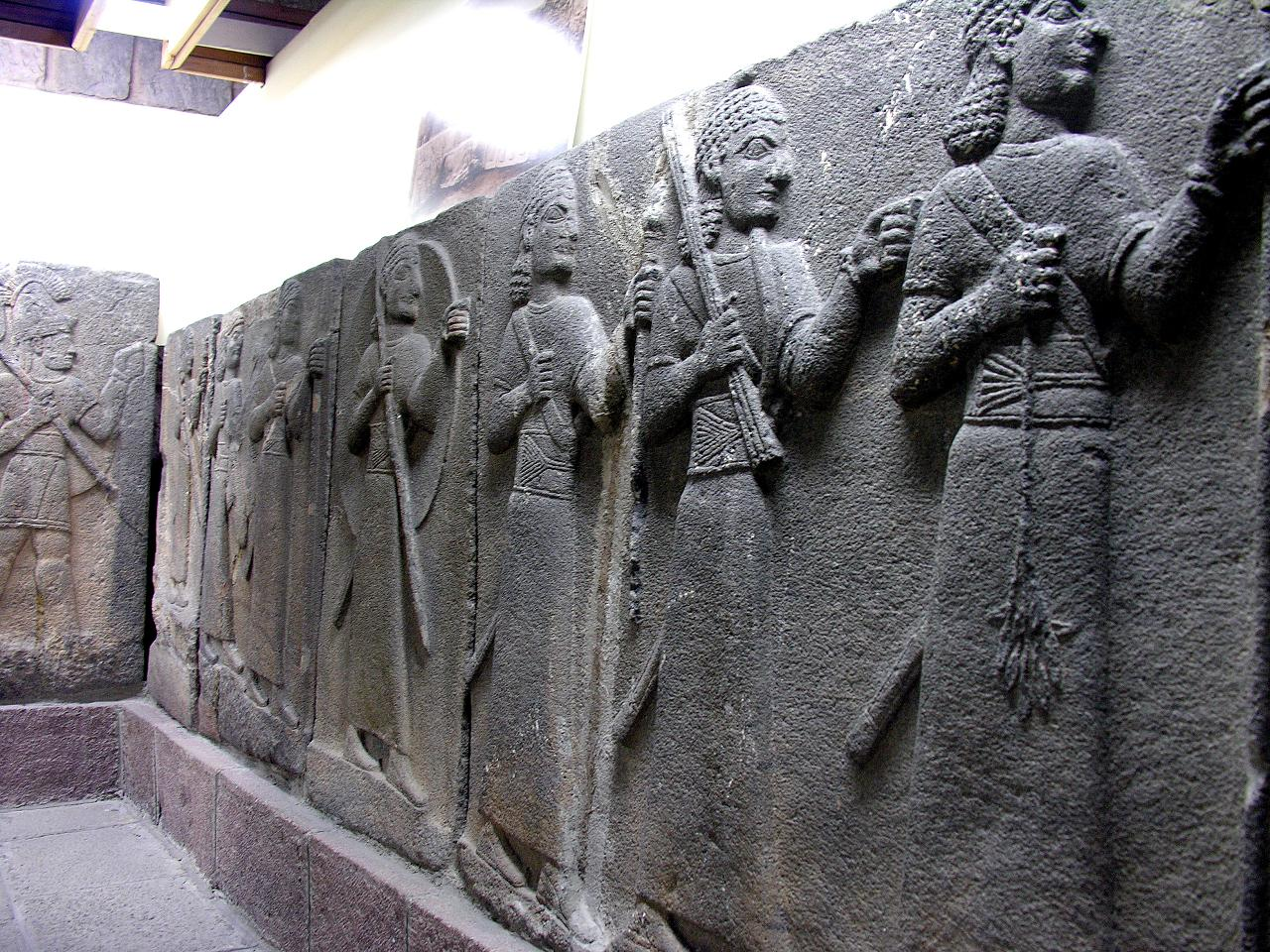
Hittite reliefs from Carchemish with marching soldiers. 8th century BC. Such orthostats adorned the Royal Buttress in Carchemish. There were long lines of such orthostats. Museum of Anatolian Civilizations

The text is in Old Hittite, with some scribal errors of the later copyists, and prescribes the oath to be taken by military commanders. More precisely, it describes a series of symbolic actions intended to represent the afflictions that should befall the oath-takers should they break their word.

On one occasion, for example, women's clothing, a spindle and an arrow is brought before those swearing their allegiance. The arrow is broken, and they are told that should they break their oath, their weapons should likewise be broken, and they should be made women and given women's tasks. Then, a blind and deaf woman is brought before them, and they are told that if they break their word, they will be made blind and deaf women like this one.

Then, a figurine of a person suffering from ascites is brought before them, and they are told that should they break their word, their bellies should swell with water, and the deities of the oath should eat their offspring (seed) within their bellies.

The deities of the oath repeatedly invoked with the Akkado-Sumerian spelling NIŠ DINGIR (representing Hittite lengai-) are identified with the goddess of treaties Išḫara and the moon god Kušuḫ.

To these similes, those swearing agree, saying "so be it". Oath-taking as conditional self-cursing in the event of oath-breaking is typical of other early Indo-European cultures.

=== Parallels in other texts ===
The Hittite compositions known as the 'Military Oaths' are also closely related to texts such as "Loyalty Oath of Town Commanders to Arnuwanda I, Ašmunikkal, and Tudḫaliya." Also, "Tudḫaliya IV's Instructions and Oath Imposition for Courtiers" fall in the same category.

Such parallels are evident in the following text, for example, in which a priest performs the rites, and articulates future punishments, while the soldiers express their consent.

"Then he places wax and sheep fat in their hands, and he casts it into the flame, and he says, “Just as this wax melts and the sheep fat separates, may he who breaks the oath and deceives the king of Ḫattusa melt like the wax, and may he be separated like the sheep fat!” And they say, “So be it!”"

== Younger text ==
There is another, younger text (CTH 428) with similar content, termed the 'second military oath'. It is more fragmentary, and its main difference is that the oath-takers are promised well-being in case they keep their word, as well as being threatened by extinction should they break it. In comparison to the older oath, the younger text shows that the Hittite pantheon was increasingly influenced by Hurrian gods.
