= Emil Forrer =

20th-century Swiss archaeologist

Emil Orgetorix Gustav Forrer (also Emilio O. Forrer; German: [ˈfɔʀɐ]; 19 February 1894 – 10 January 1986) was a Swiss Assyriologist and pioneering Hittitologist. He was the first to point out the relevance of references to Wilusa in Hittite inscriptions to the accounts of the Trojan War in the epics of Homer.

Forrer was born in Straßburg, Alsace-Lorraine. Emil Forrer developed a deviant interdisciplinary field of research (Meropisforschung), based on textual fragments of the Greek historian Theopompus of Chios, and dealing with assumed pre- or protohistoric contacts between the Old- and the New World. Antithetic to the prevailing academic school of thought, Forrer advocated the idea that Theopompos of Chios’s "Meropis" was not a fictional parody of Atlantis but an actual geographic entity. Forrer died in San Salvador.

== Works ==
- Forrer, E. Neue Probleme zum Ursprung der indogermanichen Sprachen. "Mannus", B. 26, 1934
- Forrer, E. Homerisch und silenisch Amerika, San Salvador (author's edition) 1975

== See also ==
- Meropis
- Historicity of the Iliad
- Wilusa
