= Kukkunni =

Ally of the Hittite king Suppiluliuma

King of Wiluša
- Successor: Alaksandu
- Religion: Ancient Greek religion

Kukkunni was a king of Wiluša, likely modern Hisarlık, in the late 14th century BC.

Kukkunnu is mentioned in the Alaksandu Treaty as an ally of the Hittite king Suppiluliuma I. He ruled over the city during a period of peace and prosperity visible in the archaeological layer of Troy VI. His name may be an early attestation of what would later be Hellenised and become the Greek name Kyknos.
