= Studien zu den Bogazkoy-Texten =

Studien zu den Bogazköy-Texten (abbreviated StBoT; lit. Studies in the Bogazköy (Hattusa) Texts) edited by the German Akademie der Wissenschaften und der Literatur (Academy of Sciences and Literature), Mainz, since 1965, is a series of editions of Hittite texts and monographs on topics of the Anatolian languages. The series was intended to publish the Hittite texts that were excavated at Hattusa.

== Volumes ==
1. Otten and Soucek, Das Gelübde der Königin Puduhepa an die Göttin Lelwani (1965)
2. Onofrio Carruba, Das Beschwörungsritual für die Göttin Wišurianza (1966)
6. Erich Neu, Das hethitische Mediopassiv und seine indogermanischen Grundlagen (1968)
7. Otten and von Soden, Das akkadisch-hethitische Vokabular KBo I 44 + KBo XIII 1 (1968)
10. Onofrio Carruba, Das Palaische: Texte, Grammatik, Lexicon (1970)
18. Erich Neu, Der Anitta-Text (1974)
22. Norbert Oettinger, Die militärischen Eide der Hethiter (1976)
30. Frank Starke, Die keilschrift-luwischen Texte in Umschrift (1985)
31. Frank Starke, Untersuchungen zur Stammbildung des keilschrift-luwischen Nomens (1990)
32. Erich Neu, Das hurritische Epos der Freilassung, I: Untersuchungen zu einem hurritisch-hethitischen Textensemble aus Hattusa (1996)
41. Frank Starke, Ausbildung und Training von Streitwagenpferden, eine hippologisch orientierte Interpretation des Kikkuli-Textes (1995).
45. Wilhelm (ed.) Akten des IV. Internationalen Kongresses für Hethitologie (2001)
49. Sylvain Patri, L'alignement syntaxique dans les langues indo-européennes d'Anatolie (2007), ISBN 978-3-447-05612-0

== See also ==
- Hittite texts
