= Appu (Hurrian) =

The Story of Appu is a mythological Hittite text (CTH 360). The text is fragmentary, and the sequence of events in the story is a reconstruction.

The text is usually taken as an account of a Hurrian myth, but it does not itself contain any Hurrian names or other vocabulary to support this judgement. The geographical setting is in Mesopotamia.

The reconstructed argument of the text is as follows: Appu is a rich man, but he is unhappy because he has no son. The text hints at the possibility that Appu doesn't know anything about sex. He sacrifices a lamb to ask the help of the gods. The sun-god appears and advises him to get drunk and then have sex with his wife. Eventually, Appu's wife gives birth to a first son, named Idalu (^{m}ḪUL-lu) "bad, evil". At this point the text alludes to a rite of name-giving, paralleled in the Song of Ullikummi, where the newborn is set on the knee of the father. Appu's wife later gives birth to a second son, named Ḫandanza (^{m}NÍG.SI.SÁ-an) "good, righteous". When both sons have reached adult age, Idalu suggests that they divide the paternal estate among them. He argues that, as each of the gods has his own city, so should they also each have their own property. Idalu tricks his brother, taking most of the estate and leaving him only with a barren cow. But the sun-god blesses the cow and restores her fertility. At this point the first tablet ends and the rest of the story is very fragmentary.

It appears to deal with litigation between the brothers; Idalu seems to take Handanza to court before the sun-god at Sippar. When the god rules in favour of Handanza, Idalu curses, and the sun-god refuses to conclude the case, sending the brothers to Ishtar at Nineveh to conclude the case.
