= Wilusa =

Ancient city-state, potential historical counterpart of Troy

Map of Bronze Age Near East depicting the location of Wilusa in Northwest Anatolia.

Wilusa (Hittite: 𒌷𒃾𒇻𒊭, romanized: ᵁᴿᵁ Wiluša) or Wilusiya was a Late Bronze Age city in western Anatolia (modern-day Turkey) known from references in fragmentary Hittite records. The city is notable for its identification with the archaeological site of Troy, and thus its potential connection to the legendary Trojan War.

== Identification with Troy ==
Wilusa has been identified with the archaeological site of Troy. This correspondence was first proposed in 1924 by Emil Forrer, who also suggested that the name Ahhiyawa corresponds to the Homeric term for the Greeks, Achaeans. Forrer's work was primarily motivated by linguistic similarities, since "Wilusa" and the associated placename "Taruisa" show striking parallels to the Greek names "Wilios" and "Troia" respectively. Subsequent research on Hittite geography has lent these identifications additional support and they are now generally accepted by scholars, though they are not regarded as firmly established.

One alternative hypothesis proposes that Wilusa was located near Beycesultan, which was known in the Byzantine era as "Iluza" (Greek: Ἴλουζα). Another locates it at the southern end of the Ihlara valley where the modern Turkish town of Ilisu lies.

== Historical record ==
Wilusa first appears in the historical record around 1400 BC, when it was one of the twenty-two states of the Assuwa Confederation which formed in an unsuccessful attempt to oppose the Hittite Empire. This event is referenced in several surviving Hittite documents including the Annals of Tudhaliya I/II, which gives a detailed account of the Assuwans' defeat and its aftermath. In this document, the name of the city is rendered as Wilusiya rather than the later form Wilusa, and it is listed separately from Taruisa. Circumstantial evidence raises the possibility that Ahhiyawans may have supported the rebellion. For instance, a Mycenaean-style sword found at Hattusa bears an inscription suggesting that it was taken from an Assuwan soldier and left as an offering to the Hittite storm god.

By the late 1300s BC, Wilusa was politically aligned with the Hittites. Under the reign of Kukkunni, Wilusa maintained peaceful relations with Suppiluliuma I even as nearby kingdoms in Arzawa once again rebelled. By the early 1200s BC, Wilusa had become a vassal state of the Hittites. This political arrangement, common between Western Anatolian states and the Hittites, consisted of mutual treaty obligations whereby the local ruler would support Hittite political interests in exchange for having their claim to power backed by the Hittite military. One surviving example of such a treaty is the Alaksandu Treaty made between a Wilusan king named Alaksandu and the Hittite king Muwatalli II. One of the gods guaranteeing the treaty on behalf of Wilusa is Apaliunas (Apollo). As outlined in the document, Alaksandu's obligations included both timely intelligence about potential anti-Hittite activity as well as soldiers for military expeditions. Some evidence suggests that Muwatalli invoked this later obligation, as Wilusan soldiers appear to have served in the Hittite army during the Battle of Kadesh.

At some point during Muwatalli's reign, he had to send an army to reassert Hittite control over Wilusa. The exact circumstances of this event are unclear, since it is only known from a brief mention in the poorly preserved Manapa-Tarhunta letter. One hypothesis suggests that the ruler of Wilusa had been deposed by Piyamaradu, a local warlord who toppled other pro-Hittite rulers in the area while acting on behalf of the Ahhiyawa. This interpretation finds potential support in the later Tawagalawa letter which alludes to a previous disagreement between the Hittites and Ahhiyawa concerning Wilusa. However, this evidence is not conclusive since the Tawagalawa letter does not specify whether the disagreement escalated beyond strongly worded cuneiform tablets, and the Manapa-Tarhunta letter does not directly connect Piyamaradu to the trouble in Wilusa. Evidence against this interpretation includes a section divider in the Manapa-Tarhunta letter which seems to suggest that Piyamaradu's activities and the Wilusa event were separate topics. Thus, there is no scholarly consensus as to whether the king of Wilusa was deposed by Piyamaradu, by an internal uprising, or remained in power while rebelling against the Hittites.

The final reference to Wilusa in the historical record appears in the Milawata letter, sent by the Hittite king Tudhaliya IV to one of his key vassals in western Anatolia, likely the king of Mira. Tudhaliya's letter requests that the recipient send him Walmu, the recently deposed pro-Hittite king of Wilusa, whom he intends to reinstall. The letter promises that although Walmu will be the ruler of Wilusa, the recipient will maintain ultimate authority over the various kingdoms in the region. The letter does not specify how Walmu was deposed, though its discussion of the geopolitical situation in western Anatolia makes clear that the Ahhiyawa were no longer a major power.

In popular writing, these anecdotes have been interpreted as evidence for an historical kernel in myths of the Trojan War. However, scholars have not found historical evidence for any particular event from the legends, and the Hittite documents do not suggest that Wilusa-Troy was ever attacked by Greeks-Ahhiyawa themselves. Noted Hittiteologist Trevor Bryce cautions that current understanding of Wilusa's history does not provide evidence for there having been an actual Trojan War since "the less material one has, the more easily it can be manipulated to fit whatever conclusion one wishes to come up with".

=== Known Kings of Wilusa ===
- Kukkunni (c. 1350 BC?) – a predecessor of Alaksandus, contemporary with Šuppiluliuma I.
- Alaksandu (c. 1300 BC – after 1280 BC) – contemporary with the Hittite kings Mursili II and Muwatalli II, signing peace treaties with them.
- Walmu (c. 1250 – after 1220 BC) – vassal of the Hittite king Tudhaliya IV and the state of Mira, dethroned following a possible occupation of the raids by the Ahhiyawa people. The letter from Millawata (Miletus) states that Walmu sought political asylum from Tarkasnawa, his suzerain in the kingdom of Mira. It seems that King Tudhaliya IV urged Tarkasnawa to send Walmu to the Hittite Kingdom so that he could reinstate him on the throne and return to the vassal position of both as he had been in the past.

== See also ==
- Arzawa
- Hapalla
- Historicity of the Iliad
- Karabel relief
- Kingdom of Mira
- Category:Kings of Wilusa
- Luwians
- Seha River Land
