= Alaksandu =

King of Wilusa

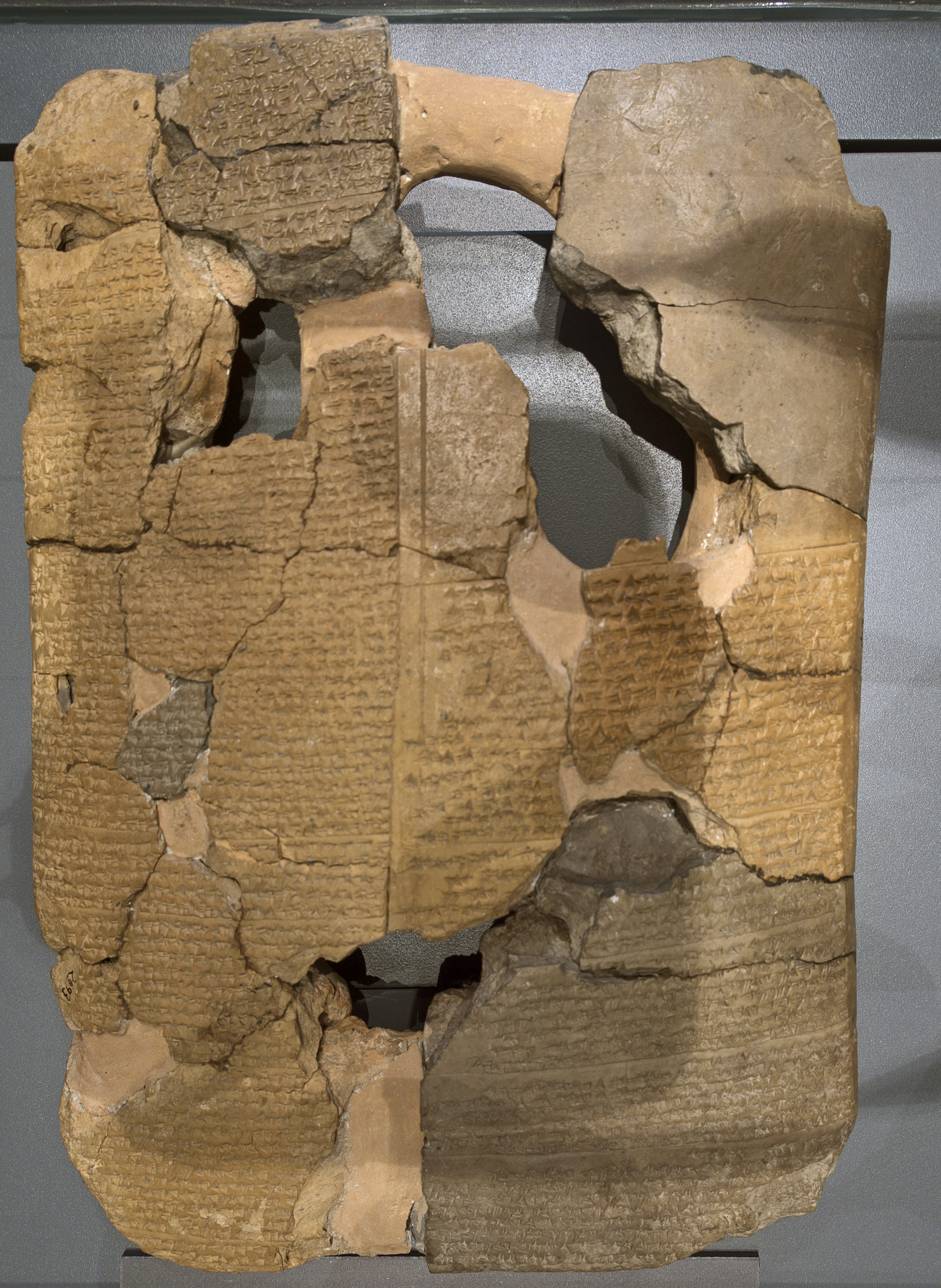
Clay tablet containing the treaty between the kings Alaksandu and Muwatalli. Troy Museum

Alaksandu (Hittite: 𒀀𒆷𒀝𒊭𒀭𒁺𒍑 Alakšanduš), alternatively called Alakasandu or Alaksandus, was a king of Wilusa who sealed a treaty with Hittite king Muwatalli II ca. 1280 BC. This treaty implies that Alaksandu had previously secured a treaty with Muwatalli's father, Mursili II, as well. His name is of possible Ancient Greek origin (see Ἀλέξανδρος).

== Biography ==
Alaksandu was a successor of one Kukkunni, although it is not known if he was his immediate successor. Muwatalli recalls the friendship of Kukkunni with his own grandfather, Suppiluliuma I, and further evokes over three centuries of friendship between the Hittites and Wilusa dating back to the reign of Hattusili I.

Muwatalli in his letter downplays the importance of royal ancestry, suggesting that Alaksandu had come to power by other means than regular succession, so that Alaksandu is not necessarily a blood-relation of Kukkunni's. This has been taken as a hint that he may have been an early Greek ruler called Alexander, and he has been associated with Homer's Alexandros of Ilios, who is better known by the name Paris of Troy. However this is uncertain, since Alaksandu lived at least half a century before the historical period sometimes associated with the Trojan War. The name Alaksandus, which does not conform to the Anatolian onomastic tradition, is probably a transcription of the Greek name Alexandros and if so would be the most early evidence of this name, still current in present-day Western culture. One of three gods guaranteeing the terms of the treaty on the side of Alaksandu is the "Stormgod of the Army", Apaliunas (^{D}A-ap-pa-li-u-na-aš), who is usually equated to Apollo. Apollo is portrayed in the Iliad as the foremost divine champion of the Trojans, the god who helped Paris kill Achilles in post-Iliad stories.

== See also ==
- Troy VII
- Ahhiyawa
- Assuwa
- Piyama-Radu
