= Hittite inscriptions =

Corpus of writing in the Hittite language

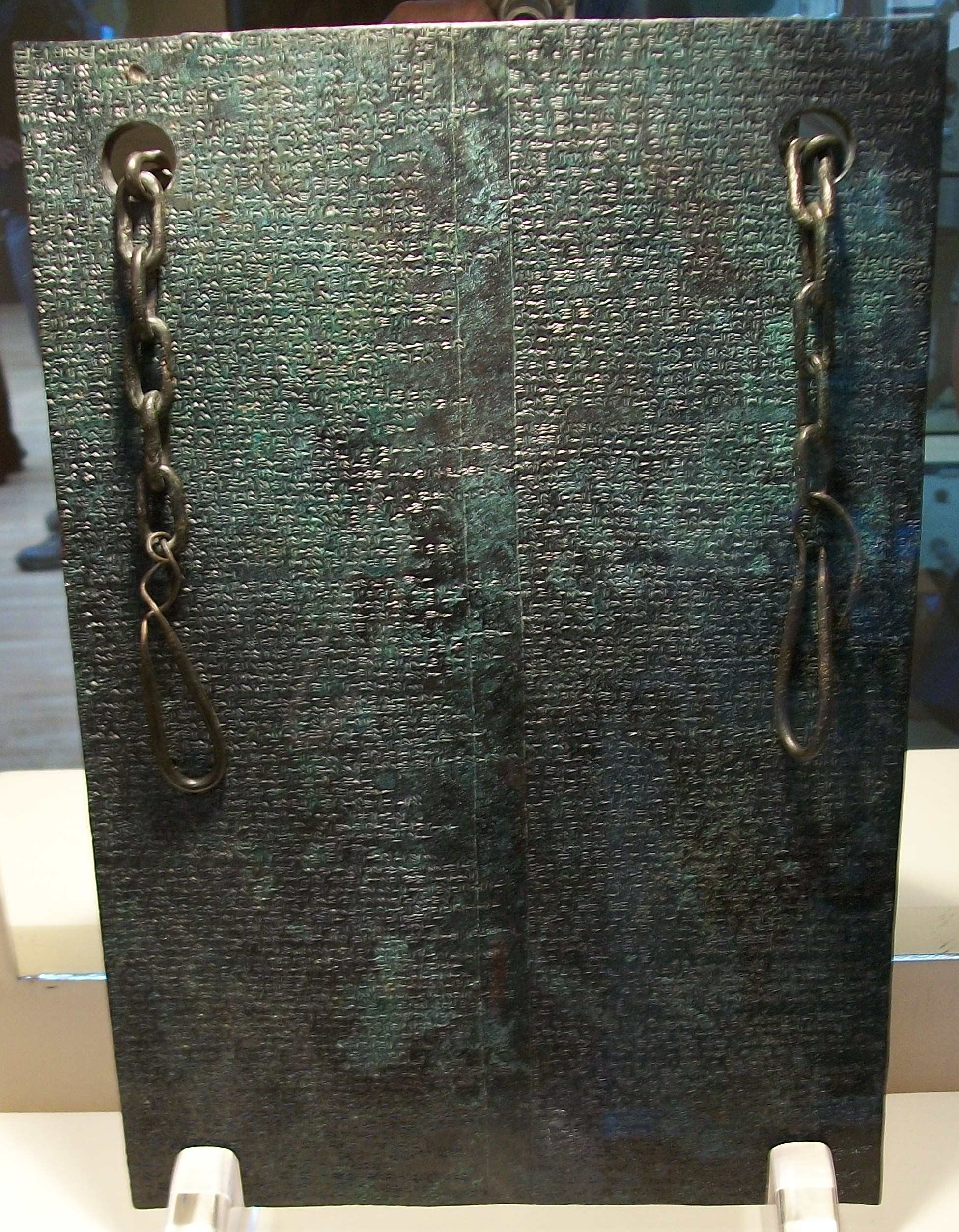
Treaty between Tudhaliya IV of Hatti and Kurunta of Tarhuntassa (Bo 86/299). This is the only bronze Hittite tablet discovered to date. Discovered in Hattusa in 1986 it is conserved in the Museum of Anatolian Civilisation in Ankara

The corpus of cuneiform texts written in the Hittite language consists of more than 30,000 tablets or fragments that have been excavated from the royal archives of the capital of the Hittite Kingdom, Hattusa, close to the modern Turkish town of Boğazkale or Boğazköy. While Hattusa has yielded the majority of tablets, other sites where they have been found include: Maşat Höyük, Ortaköy, Kuşaklı or Kayalıpınar in Turkey, Alalakh, Ugarit and Emar in Syria, Amarna in Egypt.

The tablets are mostly conserved in the Turkish museums of Ankara, Istanbul, Boğazkale and Çorum (Ortaköy) as well as in international museums such as the Pergamonmuseum in Berlin, the British Museum in London and the Musée du Louvre in Paris.

The corpus is indexed by the Catalogue des Textes Hittites (CTH, since 1971). The catalogue is only a classification of texts; it does not give the texts. One traditionally cites texts by their numbers in CTH. Major sources for studies of selected texts themselves are the books of the StBoT series and the online Textzeugnisse der Hethiter.

== CTH numbering scheme ==
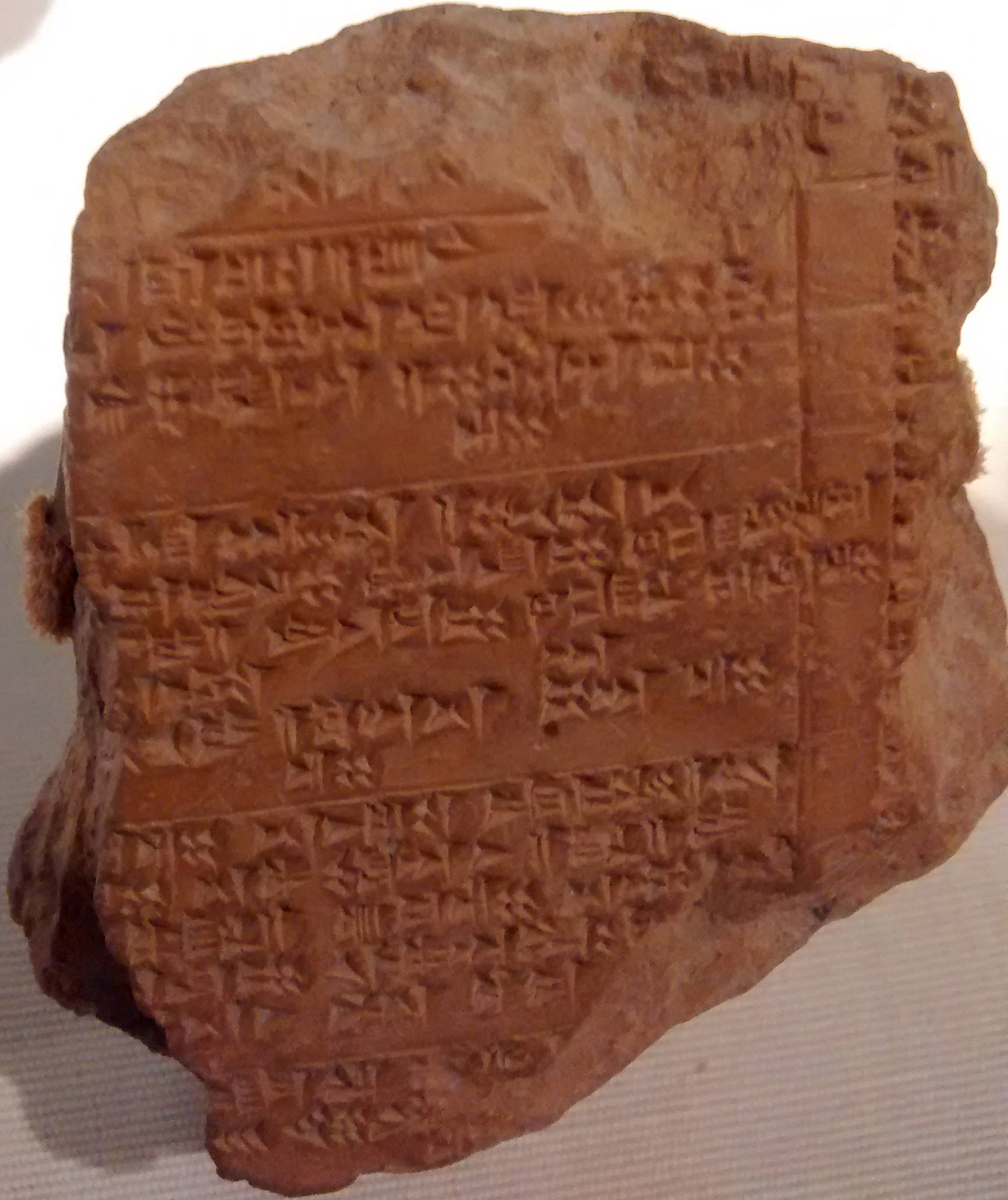
CTH 738.I 11: Festival for Goddess Tetešḫapi

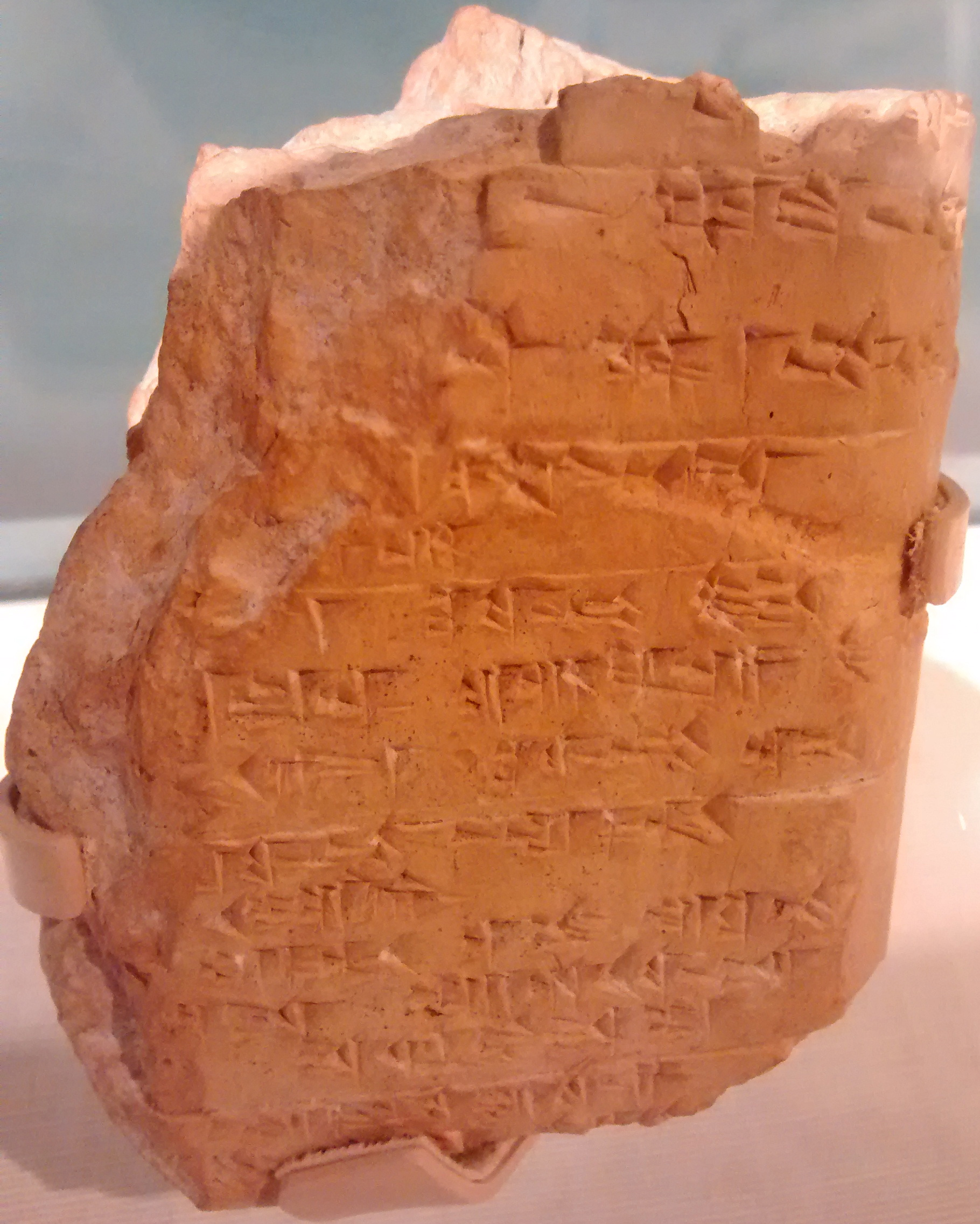
CTH 832: Legal Deposition(?)

The texts are classified as follows:

- Historical Texts (CTH 1–220)
- Administrative Texts (CTH 221–290)
- Legal Texts (CTH 291–298)
- Lexical Texts (CTH 299–309)
- Literary Texts (CTH 310–320)
- Mythological Texts (CTH 321–370)
- Hymns and Prayers (CTH 371–389)
- Ritual Texts (CTH 390–500)
- Cult Inventory Texts (CTH 501–530)
- Omen and Oracle Texts (CTH 531–582)
- Vows (CTH 583–590)
- Festival Texts (CTH 591–724)
- Texts in Other Languages (CTH 725–830)
- Texts of Unknown Type (CTH 831–833)

== Selected texts ==
Some Wikipedia articles dedicated to specific Hittite texts follow. More are to be found as sections of other articles.

=== Old Kingdom ===
- Anitta text
- Hittite military oath
- Hittite laws (CTH 291–292), also called the Code of the Nesilim
- Myth of Illuyanka
- Telipinu Proclamation

=== New Kingdom ===
- Aleppo Treaty
- Bronze Tablet (Kurunta Treaty)
- Kikkuli's horse training instructions
- Indictment of Madduwatta
- Manapa-Tarhunta letter
- Milawata letter
- Song of Kumarbi
- Story of Appu
- Tawagalawa letter
- Zita (Hittite prince)

== See also ==
- Amarna letters
- Ugaritic texts
