= Milawata letter =

1240 B.C. item of diplomatic correspondence

The Milawata letter (CTH 182) is an item of diplomatic correspondence from a Hittite king at Hattusa to a client king in western Anatolia around 1240 BC. It constitutes an important piece of evidence in the debate concerning the historicity of Homer's Iliad.

The reason for its title "Milawata letter" is that it mentions that both parties to the letter had campaigned on the borders of Milawata; it also mentions the city Atriya, elsewhere known as a dependent of "Millawanda". Millawanda and Milawata are accepted as ancient names for Miletus.

The letter demands that the client resolve a dispute over hostages, turn over fugitives from Hittite justice, and turn over a pretender from Wilusa to a Hittite envoy so that the Hittites can reinstall him as king there. The letter reminds the recipient that the recipient's father had turned against the Hittite king. The Hittite king then installed the recipient as king in place of that one's father. It also mentions that the recipient's domain is on the coast. However, since it covers events from Wilusa to Milawata, and since the current understanding is that this implies Troy to the north, down to Miletus in the south, it must be deduced which domain this should be. Both the Kingdom of Mira and the Seha River Land were carved out of the coastal state and alliances of Arzawa, and both had rulers in the late 14th century BC which rebelled against Hatti. Of what is known of Mira and the Seha River Land, the best match is Kupanta-Kurunta of Mira. When Manapa-Tarhunta of the Seha River Land joined Uhha-Ziti's revolt against Mursili II around 1320 BC, he did rather little himself; and Manapa-Tarhunta remained quiet after Mursili forgave him. By contrast, Mashuiluwa of Mira rebelled and incited Pitassa into revolt in c. 1310. After this, Mursili deposed Mashuiluwa and elevated Mashuiluwa's nephew and adopted son Kupanta-Kurunta (who was Mursili's nephew as well).

In a subsequent treaty, Mursili agreed to cede Kuwaliya to Kupanta-Kurunta, which had as a border the Astarpa (Meander?) river — which Mursili mentioned in his annals as close to "Millawanda"; the Milawata border also features in the Milawata letter. Lastly, although this is an "argument from convenience", Kupanta-Kurunta is known to have lasted as monarch into the reign of Hattusili III (1265–1235 BC), which allows for multiple candidates for authorship on the Hittite side; assuming that the treaty between Muwatalli II (1295–1272 BC) and Alaksandu of Wilusa has not erred (but note Beckman's footnote in Hittite Diplomatic Texts), Manapa-Tarhunta died before that treaty (that is, before c. 1280 BC).

Like the Manapa-Tarhunta letter (c. 1295 BC) and the Tawagalawa letter (c. 1250 BC), the Milawata letter mentions the infamous adventurer Piyama-Radu; but as a figure of the past. The very name "Milawata" seems to be a later development, on its way to becoming the "Mil[w]atos" of the Linear B / LHIIIB tablets of Pylos and Thebes. The scholarly consensus places the Milawata letter at the tail of this series of letters.

Burney and Bryce attribute the Milawata letter to Tudhaliya IV writing to a later king of Mira. If so, the letter's references to the events in which Kupanta-Kurunta and Mursili II participated are meant to evoke their dynasties rather than the actual characters, or else parallel events from a later period (which would however remove some of the above arguments for placing the letter at Mira). Tarkasnawa is a likely candidate for the recipient of the Milawata letter.

== See also ==
- Tawagalawa letter
- Manapa-Tarhunta letter
