= Piyamaradu =

Warlord in Hittite texts

Piyamaradu (also spelled Piyama-Radu, Piyama Radu, Piyamaradus, Piyamaraduš) was a warlord mentioned in Hittite documents from the middle and late 13th century BC. As an ally of the Ahhiyawa, he led or supported insurrections against the Hittite empire in Western Anatolia. His history is of particular interest since his area of activity may have included Wilusa, thus suggesting a potential connection to the myth of the Trojan War.

== Meaning of the name ==
The name appears to be a compound with Luwian piyama "gift" as its first part. Other Luwian names containing the same word are attested, such as Piyama-Kurunta.

The second part of the word was earlier believed to be an unknown theonym *Radu, but since Luwian words do not start with an r, it must be aradu, which may be a noun meaning "devotee", derived "from *arada- 'religious community (vel sim.)', itself a derivative of *ara- 'associate' (cf. Hittite ara- 'id.').

== The identity and exploits of Piyamaradu ==
Piyamaradu's renegade activities are remarkable for their duration, having spanned at least 35 years, during which time he posed a considerable threat to three Hittite kings: Muwatalli II, Hattusili III, and Tudhaliya IV.

Some scholars speculate that Piyamaradu was the legitimate heir of Uhha-Ziti, a previous king of Arzawa who was dethroned by the Hittite king Mursili II; perhaps he was the son of Uhha-Ziti or the son of Piyama-Kurunta. However, Piyamaradu is nowhere referred to as a prince, and Bryce and Sommers prefer to describe him as a "rebellious Hittite dignitary". His attacks and raids in Western Anatolia on the Hittite vassal states of Arzawa, Seha, Lazpa (Lesbos) and Wilusa (Troy) have been interpreted as an attempt to reassert his own dynastic claim. He probably made a concurrent plea to the Great King of Hatti to be accepted as a Hittite vassal king.

When his application was deprecated, he rebelled, and the Great King of Hatti suppressed him through the agency of a trusted vassal, Manapa-Tarhunta. Piyamaradu turned for support to the Great King of Ahhiyawa (Achaea, i.e. Mycenean Greece), and married his daughter to Atpa, the vassal ruler of Millawanda (Miletus).

Because he had allied with the Great King of Ahhiyawa against the Great King of Hatti, the Hittite archives call Piyamaradu a "troublemaker", "adventurer", "freebooter", or "mercenary", though he may have considered himself merely to be upholding his own (hereditary?) rights. The salience of his exploits in the record, together with his name and claim, render his dynastic descent plausible, but still entirely speculative.

== Identification with Homeric personages ==
Piyamaradu has been conjectured to correspond to the archetype embodied in the epic/legendary Priam of Troy in the Iliad. Konstantinos Kopanias also suggests that Greek oral tradition remembering Piyamaradu's exploits served as the basis for later stories about Achilles in the Epic Cycle.

== Hittite archives ==
The relevant Hittite archival correspondence referring to him include:

- Manapa-Tarhunta letter "...a notorious local troublemaker called Piyamaradu is harrying Wilusiya, a land of the Assuwa federation loosely allied with the Hittite Empire. The Hittite king has apparently ordered Manapa-Tarhunda to drive out Piyamaradu himself, but Manapa-Tarhunda's attempt has failed, so that a Hittite force is now sent out to deal with the problem."
- Tawagalawa letter "The letter would be more appropriately known as the 'Piyama-Radu letter'".
- Milawata letter "Like the Tawagalawa letter and also the Manapa-Tarhunta letter, the Milawata letter mentions the infamous adventurer Piyama-Radu; but as a figure of the past."
- Letter from a King of Hatti (Hattusili III?) to another Great King. Includes a reference to Piyamaradu along with the King of Ahhiyawa, but the text is too fragmentary for interpretation.
- Votive Prayer of Puduhepa, consort of Hattusili III and chief priestess. Dated to the mid-thirteenth century B.C., Puduhepa has traveled to the sea to make an offering in return for the sea god's intervention in apprehending Piyamaradu. One other god is appealed to, but the reference to the god's name is fragmentary.

== See also ==
- Kingdom of Mira
- Luwians
- Madduwatta
- Seha River Land

== Bibliography ==
- American Journal of Archaeology Online Forum: "The Importance of Troy in the Late Bronze Age 2005--03-10";
- Heinhold-Krahmer, Susanne.
  - 1986. "Untersuchungen zu Piyamaradu (Teil II)." Orientalia 55.47-62.
  - 1983. "Untersuchungen zu Piyamaradu (Teil I)." Orientalia 52.81-97.
- Gurney, Oliver 2002. "The authorship of the Tawagalawas Letter." Silva Anatolica Vol. 2002, pp. 133–141.
- Beckman, Gary M., Bryce, Trevor R., Cline, Eric H. The Ahhijawa Texts 2011, Atlanta, Society of Biblical Literature.
- Hoffner, Harry A., and Beckman, Gary M., Letters from the Hittite Kingdom 2009, Atlanta, Society of Biblical Literature
- Max Gander (2014), An Alternative View on the Location of Arzawa. Hittitology today: Studies on Hittite and Neo-Hittite Anatolia in Honor of Emmanuel Laroche’s 100th Birthday. Alice Mouton, ed. p. 163-190
- Susanne Heinhold-Krahmer, Elisabeth Rieken (eds.): Der "Tawagalawa-Brief": Beschwerden über Piyamaradu. Eine Neuedition. (= Untersuchungen zur Assyriologie und vorderasiatischen Archäologie. Bd. 13). de Gruyter, Berlin/ Boston 2019, ISBN 978-3-11-058116-4.

== External sites ==
- Piyamaradu Università degli Studi di Firenze - sagas.unifi.it
