= Karkiya =

Ancient region in western Anatolia

Karkiya or Karkisa was a Late Bronze Age region in western Anatolia known from references in Hittite and Egyptian records. It is believed to refer to the classical era region of Caria or to a region where ancestors of the Carians lived at the time, though this identification has not been firmly established.

== Name ==
The name Karkisa/Karkiya has been argued to be related to later terms for Caria such as Greek Kares, Akkadian Karsa, and Persian Karka. However, the linguistic link is not firmly established, since the differences between the earlier and later terms do not follow regular patterns of sound change and the relevance of such laws to the transmission of toponyms between languages has been questioned.

== History ==
=== Late Bronze ===
Karkiya was governed by a council of chiefs rather than a king, and thus was not a unified political entity. The Karkiyans had relations with the Hittite Empire, but were never part of the empire proper. Relations with the Hittites had ups and downs, and Karkiyan soldiers fought for the Hittites at the Battle of Kadesh, most likely as mercenaries.

It is currently impossible to pinpoint Karkiya's location beyond it being in western Anatolia. Its identification with the later area of Caria is motivated by textual evidence which potentially suggests a location to the north of Lukka, south of Arzawa-Mira, west of Tarhuntassa, but inland from Millawanda. However, there is room for doubt of this textual interpretation. Woudhuizen has located the Bronze Age forerunners of Karkiyans amongst the Cyclades, though there is no known archaeological evidence for or against such migrations.

== See also ==
- Arzawa
- Mira
- Hapalla
- Historicity of the Iliad
- Luwians
- Lukka
- Seha River Land
