= Manapa-Tarhunta letter =

Fragmentary text

The Manapa-Tarhunta letter (CTH 191; KUB 19.5 + KBo 19.79) is a fragmentary text in the Hittite language from the 13th century BC. The letter was sent to the Hittite king by Manapa-Tarhunta, client king of the Seha River Land. In the letter, Manapa-Tarhunta discusses Hittite attempts to reassert control over northwest Anatolia. The letter is particularly notable for its mention of Wilusa, generally identified with Troy.

== Content ==
The letter identifies its author as Manapa-Tarhunta, client king of the Seha River Land. Manapa-Tarhunta is discussed in other Hittite documents, which indicate that he was already in power when Mursili II ascended the Hittite throne in 1321 BC, and that he was removed from power by Muwatalli II, who ruled from 1295 to 1272 BC. While the addressee is not explicitly named, scholars generally agree that it was Muwatalli II.

The letter begins by assuring Muwattalli, "[At the moment] everything is fine". In the next section, it reports that Hittite troops arrived in Seha and then headed onward to attack Wilusa. However, Manapa-Tarhunta himself was unable to take part in this expedition due to a severe illness.

After a paragraph divider, the letter turns to its main topic, the defection of a group of craftsmen. We learn that the Seha River Land had been attacked by a warlord named Piyamaradu, who installed a man named Atpa as its de facto ruler. After the attack, a group of dyers from Lazpa had defected from Manapa-Tarhunta to Atpa. However, after the arrival of a Hittite regiment, King Kupanta-Kurunta of neighbouring Mira was able to negotiate the return of the craftsmen.

== Interpretation ==
The events described in the letter have been interpreted as part of a proxy war between the Hittites and the Ahhiyawa. Though the letter itself does not mention the Ahhiyawa, other texts such as the Tawagalawa letter reveal that Piyamaradu was allied with them and that Atpa had served as the Ahhiyawa-appointed governor of Milawata.

Because of this, the mention of an attack on Wilusa has sometimes been interpreted as evidence for a historical Trojan War. Although this interpretation remains a viable hypothesis, it is not favored by current scholarship since the section divider seems to suggest that Piyamaradu's activities were a separate topic from the attack on Wilusa. Thus, the text does not provide reason to think that the Hittites were responding to an Ahhiya-backed siege as opposed to an internal uprising or the kingdom itself refusing Hittite authority. Hittitologist Trevor Bryce cautions that "Overall, the letter is of very dubious value in terms of any possible bearing it may have on the Trojan War tradition."

However, the letter does provide important geographic evidence supporting the identification of Wilusa with the archaeological site of Troy. From other texts, scholars have generally concluded that the modern day Karabel Pass served as the southern border of the Seha River Land. Since the Manapa-Tarhunta letter suggests that the kingdom included Lazpa, this would place its northern border in the area of the Troad. Given that the letter also suggests that Seha and Wilusa were neighbors, this information would restrict possible locations for Wilusa to an area in which Troy is the only major fortified city. These arguments are generally accepted by scholars, though they are not regarded as beyond question. In particular, Max Gander has argued that the text need not be read as suggesting that Seha ruled over Lazpa, and that it could have been located as far south as the Meander River.

== See also ==
- Tawagalawa letter
- Milawata letter
- Historicity of the Homeric epics

== Literature ==
- Eric H. Cline, Gary M. Beckman, Trevor Bryce, eds (2012), The Ahhiyawa Texts. Society of Biblical Literature ISBN 9789004219717 (9004219714)
- Forrer, Forsch. I/1 ('26) 90ff., AU ('32) 170 n.1
- Houwink ten Cate, JEOL 28 (1985) 33-79;
- Steph. JAOS 84:27 n. 35
