= Tarḫuntaradu =

King of Arzawa in the 14th century BC

Tarhuntaradu

King of Arzawa
- Reign: c. 1375 BC

Tarḫuntaradu (Luwian: "worshiper/gift of Tarḫunt"; fl. c. 1375 BC) was king of Arzawa during the first half of the 14th century BC.

== Name ==
The name Tarḫuntaradu consists of two elements Tarḫunta + radu. Tarḫunta was the Anatolian storm god written in Akkadian cuneiform as ^{d}U.

In earlier literature, the name ^{m} ^{d}U-ra-du, read as Dadaradu or Daddaradu, or Dattaradu. The deity ^{d}U was the same as Tarḫunt, which became the modern reading. The name was also rendered as Tarkundaradu. The same was true to the city Tarhuntassa previously read as Dadassa.

== History ==
=== Military campaign ===
Under his rule, the Luwian kingdom of Arzawa centered on Apasa (Ephesus) managed to penetrate far into the territory of Hittite ruled by Tudhaliya III, then weakened by invasions of the Kaška peoples. Tarhuntaradu occupied areas in the "Lower Land" (Lycaonia), and succeeded in penetrating as far as the Hittite city of Tuwanuwa.

Ultimately, the Hittites would defeat Arzawa under Suppiluliuma I. By the end of the reign of Suppiluliuma I, Uhha-Ziti ruled Arzawa. He rebelled and Arzawa was divided into lesser vassal states under Mursili II.

=== Relations with Egypt ===
He negotiated with, and wed one of his daughters to, the Egyptian pharaoh Amenhotep III, who acknowledged him as "Great King" - a title usually given to the Hittite ruler.

== Theory ==
=== Relations with Crete ===
Achterberg et al. posit the Phaistos disc to be a letter sent by Tarhuntaradu to King Nestor concerning land ownership and in praise of the latter.

== Literature ==
Susanne Heinhold-Krahmer: Tarḫundaradu, Tarḫun(n)aradu. In: Michael P. Streck (ed.): Reallexikon der Assyriologie und Vorderasiatischen Archäologie ["Real lexicon of Assyriology and Near Eastern Archeology"]. Vol. 13, Walter de Gruyter, Berlin/Boston 2011–2013, ISBN 978-3-11-030715-3, pp. 459–460.
