= Kupanta-Kurunta (king of Arzawa) =

First Arzawan king

King of Arzawa
- Reign: c. 1400 BC

Kupanta-Kurunta (or Kupanta-Kruntiya; fl. c. 1400 BC) was the first recorded king of Arzawa, in the early 14th century BC.

Kupanta-Kurunta, the "man of Arzawa," is recorded as defeated by the Hittite joint great kings Tudḫaliya II and Arnuwanda I, but avoiding capture and retaining his territory. Either subsequently or on an earlier occasion described retroactively in Hittite sources, Kupanta-Kurunta was attacked by a restive Hittite vassal, Madduwatta of Zippašla, who acted without authorization from the Hittites. Kupanta-Kurunta defeated Madduwatta and invaded the latter's lands in turn, causing him to flee for his life and taking over his refuge Šalawašši. When the Hittites came to Madduwatta's aid under the general Pišeni, Kupanta-Kurunta had to retreat, losing some of his booty, but the Hittites made no attempt to conquer Arzawa. During the reign of Arnuwanda I, Madduwatta made an alliance with his erstwhile enemy, Kupanta-Kurunta, who married Madduwatta's daughter. While doing so, Madduwatta assured the Hittite monarch of his loyalty, portraying his alliance with Kupanta-Kurunta as a ploy. If a Hittite text is to be taken literally, that Madduwatta "took the whole land of Arzawa for himself," he might have eliminated Kupanta-Kurunta in the end.

A letter found at Šapinuwa (Ortaköy) was sent to a Hittite great king by a vassal named Uḫḫamuwa, reporting that a Kupanta-Kurunta, Tarḫunnaradu, and three sons of Kupanta-Kurunta, called Mašturi, Piyam-aradu, and Kupanta-zalma, convened at the town of Ḫappuriya. While it is probable that the Hittite king in question was Tudḫaliya III, it is unclear whether the letter refers to the Kupanta-Kurunta who was an adversary of Tudḫaliya II and Arnuwanda I, or to any king of Arzawa at all. An obscure Uḫḫa-zalma (or Ḫuḫḫa-zalma), who concluded a treaty with Arnuwanda I, has been posited as a possible successor of Kupanta-Kurunta.

Arzawa remained a powerful adversary of Hittite for several generations, until reduced to the position of a Hittite vassal in the reign of the Hittite great king Muršili II.

== Bibliography ==
- Bryce, Trevor (2005), The Kingdom of the Hittites, Oxford.
- Bryce, Trevor (2009), The Routledge Handbook of The People and Places of Ancient Western Asia, New York.
- Freu, Jacques, and Michel Mazoyer (2007b), Les débuts du nouvel empire hittite, Paris.
- Yakubovich, Ilya (2008), Sociolinguistics of the Luvian language, doctoral dissertation, University of Chicago. online
