= Hittite plague =

14th century BC epidemic of tularemia

Hittite Plague
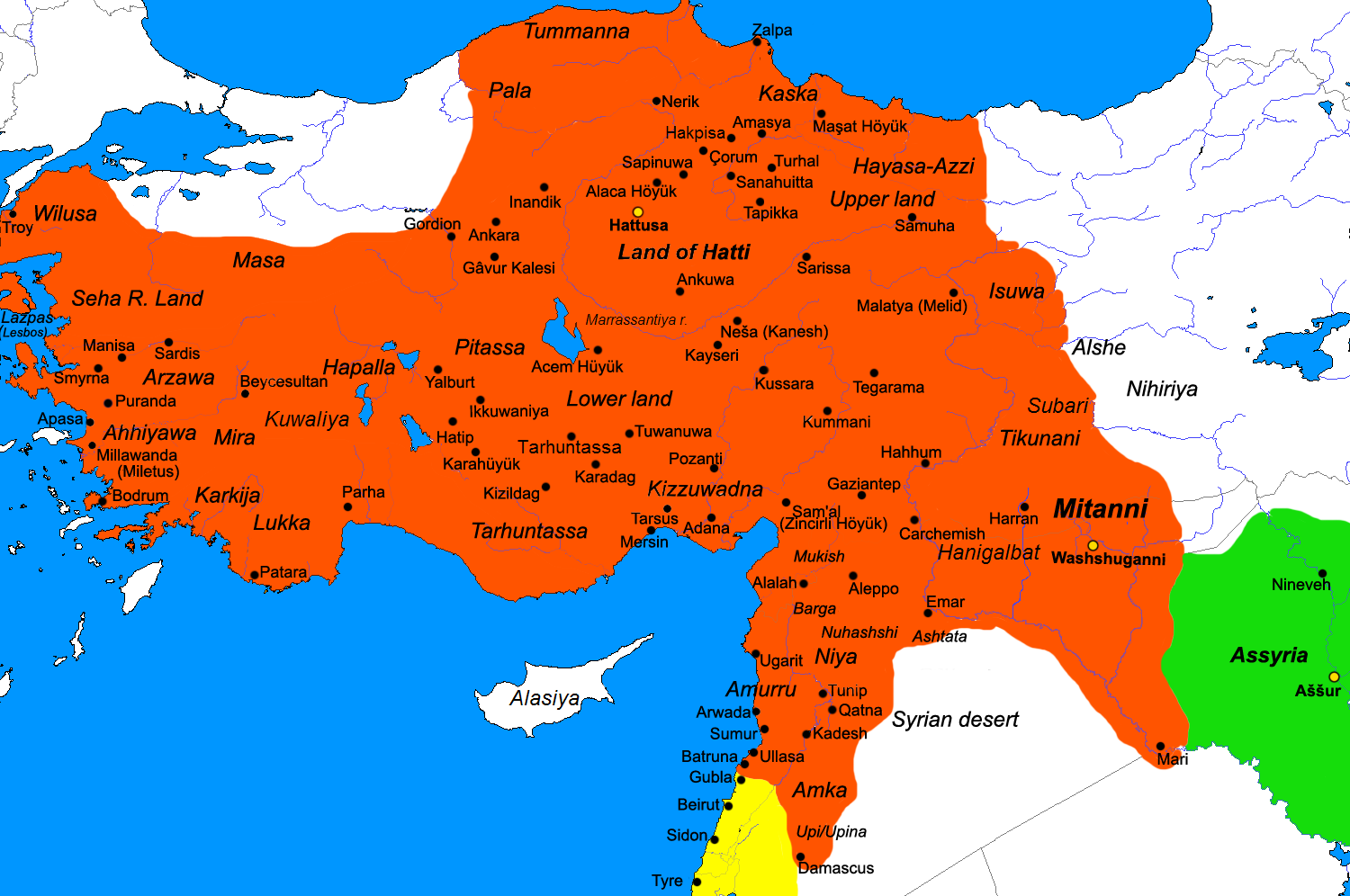
- Map of the Hittite Empire in the late 14th century BC
- Disease: Unknown, possibly Tularemia
- Location: Near East
- First outbreak: Hattusa or Alashiya
- First reported: Mid-to-late 14th century BC
- Territories: Hittite Empire, Alashiya (Cyprus), Levant/Canaan, Anatolia, possibly Egypt

The Hittite Plague or Hand of Nergal was an epidemic, possibly of tularemia, which occurred in the mid-to-late 14th century BC. It is considered the earliest known use of biological warfare.

== Background ==
The Hittite Empire stretched from Turkey to Syria. The plague was likely an outbreak of Francisella tularensis which occurred along the Arwad–Euphrates trading route in the 14th century BC. Much of the ancient Near East suffered from outbreaks; however, Egypt and Assyria initiated a quarantine along their border, and they did not experience the epidemic.

Tularemia is a bacterial infection which is still a threat. It is also referred to as "rabbit fever" and it is a zoonotic disease which can easily pass from animals to humans. The most common way that it is spread is through various arthropods which hop between species, such as ticks. The symptoms of an infection range from skin lesions to respiratory failure. Without treatment the mortality rate is 15% of those infected. According to former microbiologist Siro Trevisanato, "Tularemia is rare in many countries today, but remains a problem in some countries including Bulgaria."

== Epidemic ==
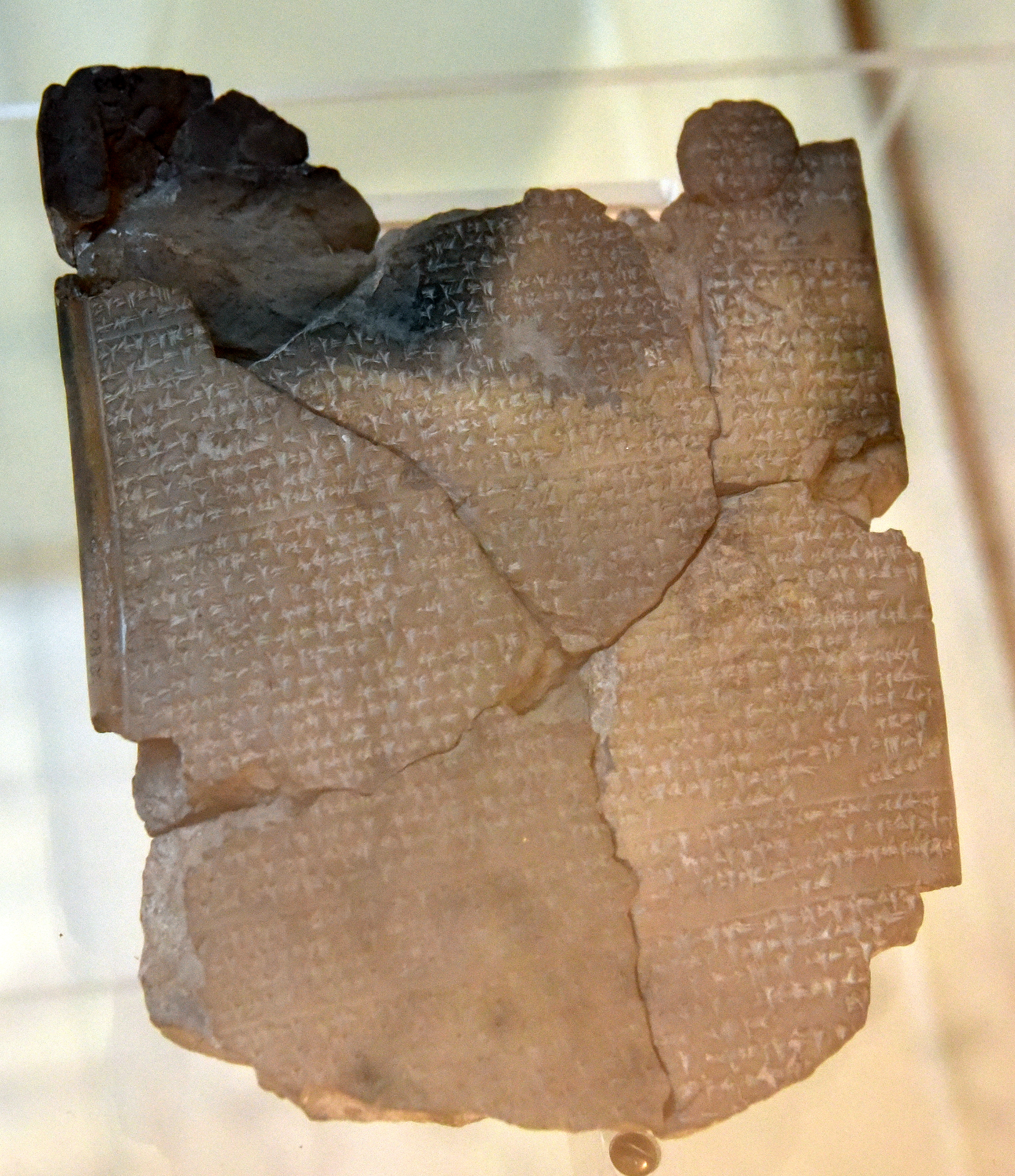
Prayers to the gods to end the plague, by Muršili II, from the 14th century BC. Originally from Hattusa, now in the Istanbul Archaeological Museum.

According to author Philip Norrie (How Disease Affected the End of the Bronze Age), there are three diseases most likely to have caused a post-Bronze Age societal collapse: smallpox, bubonic plague, and tularemia. The tularemia plague which struck the Hittites could have been spread by insects or infected dirt or plants, through open wounds, or by eating infected animals.

Hittite texts from the mid-14th century BC refer to the plague causing disabilities and death. Hittite King Muršili II wrote prayers seeking relief from the epidemic, which had lasted two decades and killed many of his subjects. The two kings who preceded him, Šuppiluliuma I and Šuppiluliuma's immediate heir, Arnuwanda II, had also succumbed to tularemia. Muršili had ascended to the throne because he was the last surviving son of Šuppiluliuma.

Muršili believed that the plague had been transmitted to the Hittites by Egyptian prisoners who had been paraded through the capital city, Hattusa. There is some evidence suggesting that the Egyptians suffered from tularemia in the years preceding 1322 BC. The Hittites apparently also suspected zoonotic transmission, because they banned the use of donkeys in caravans. Another theory of the plague's origin suggests that it originated with rams that the Hittites had taken as spoils of war, along with other animals, after the Hittites raided Simyra. Soon after the animals were brought into Hittite villages, the tularemia outbreak began.

== Plague of Alashiya, "The Hand of Nergal" ==
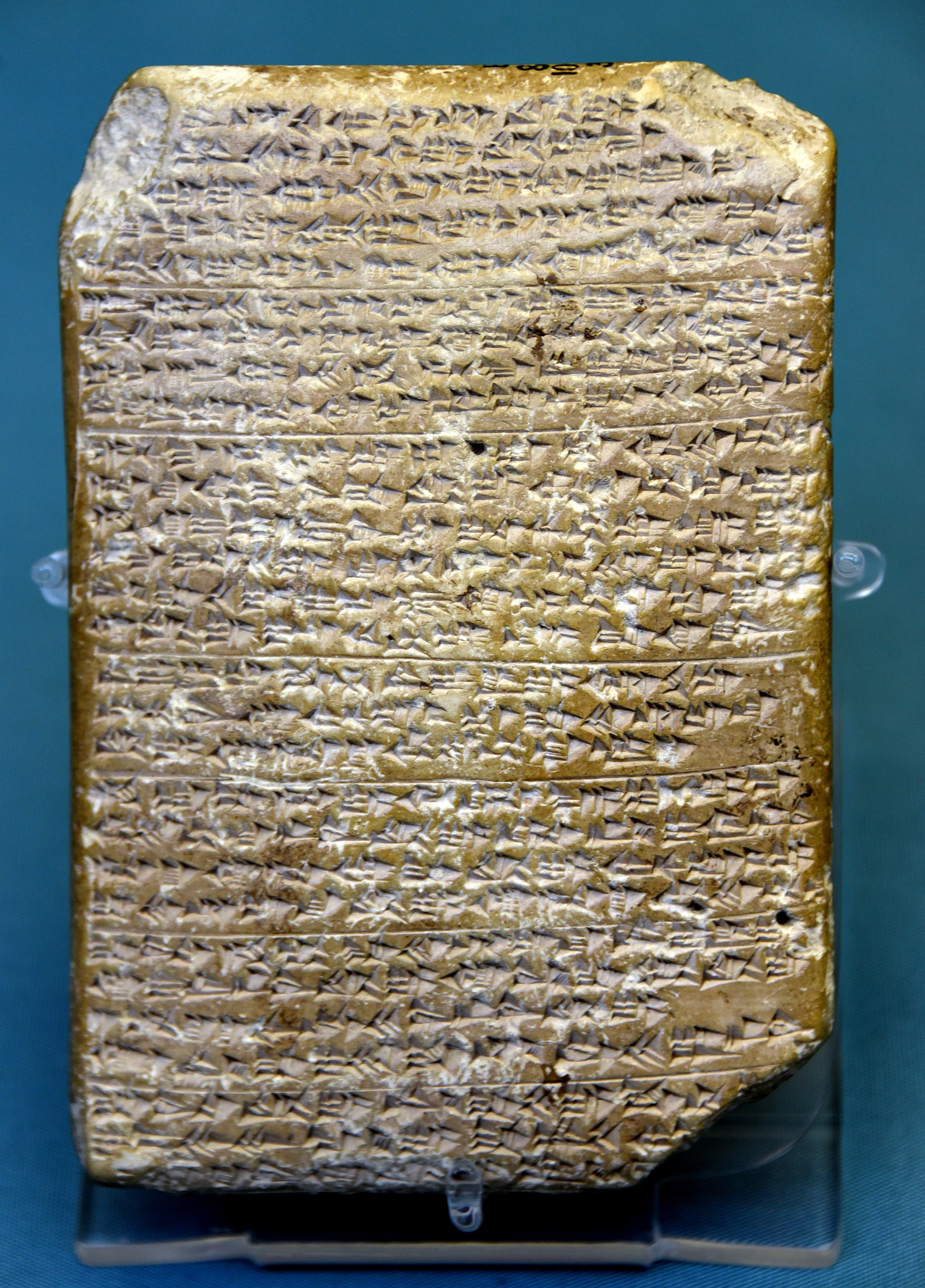
Amarna Letter EA 35, which names the plague as the "Hand of Nergal", from roughly 1350-1325 BC, found in Amarna, now at the British Museum.

The plague is mentioned in Amarna letter EA 35, a letter written in Akkadian from the ruler of Alashiya (Cyprus) to the Pharaoh of Egypt during the Amarna Period. It dates from between 1350 and 1325 BC. In it, the plague is specially named as The Hand of Nergal. While Muršili II seems to have believed of an Egyptian origin to the disease, letter EA 35 seems to support a Cypriot origin. If Muršili's account is to be believed, it is possible that the plague spread to Egypt from Cyprus, or that Egyptian soldiers became infected in the Levant. While a majority of scholars see EA 35 as evidence of the Hittite Plague being in Cyprus, as it unclear to which Egyptian Pharaoh it was sent to, a significant minority believe that the two events may be two successive outbreaks of the same plague, or possibly two different plagues entirely. While it is universally accepted letter EA 35 predates Anatolian references to the disease, the time between the events is unclear, and could be from between two to twenty-five years. It is also generally agreed the plague on Cyprus was probably tularemia, lending credence to a connection between the events.

== Use against the Arzawans ==
The disease was intentionally brought to western Anatolia in what is described as the "first known record of biological warfare". Shortly after the Hittites experienced the outbreak of disease, the Arzawans from western Anatolia believed the Hittites were weakened and attacked them. The Arzawans claimed that rams suddenly appeared (1320 and 1318 BC) and the Arzawans brought them into their villages. It is thought that the Hittites had sent rams diseased with tularemia to infect their enemies. The Arzawans became so weakened by the plague that they failed in their attempt to conquer the Hittites.
