= Hapalla =

Bronze Age kingdom

Anatolia during the Late Bronze Age

Hapalla (Hittite: 𒄩𒁄𒆷 Hapalla or Haballa), was a Late Bronze Age petty kingdom in central-western Anatolia. As one of the Arzawa states, it was a sometime vassal and sometime enemy of the Hittite Empire.

== History ==
All we know about Hapalla comes from Hittite royal archives. It bordered to the west by Mira, to the east by the Lower Land, and to the south by the land of Tarhuntassa, thus Hapalla may correspond to the classical region of Pisidia. Because of its position so close to the heart of the empire, it was often paid more attention by the Hittites, which considered it a bit like a buffer between the motherland and its Arzawa vassals.

=== Late Bronze ===
==== Hittite Middle Kingdom ====
The first mention of Hapalla is when Arnuwanda I (c. 1380 BCE) asks for help against a local uprising there. He bestows this duty to his vassal Madduwatta, who betrays him by taking Hapalla for himself. After threats from Arnuwanda, Madduwatta yields and hands it back to the Hittites.

==== Hittite New Kingdom (Hittite Empire) ====
===== Suppiluliuma I =====
When the Hittites are retaking their lands under Suppiluliuma I (c. 1350 BC), he sent his army into Hapalla, whose capital is burnt down and inhabitants deported. In 1340 BC, an independent Seha River Land, Mira, and Hapalla are carved out of Arzawa, who only retain their capital, Apasa, and the surrounding land.

===== Mursili II =====
The first sovereign known to us from Hapalla was Targasnalli who, after the failure of the uprising of Uhha-Ziti against Hittite monarch Muršili II (1319 BC), agreed to submit again to the authority of Hattuša and therefore was "...re-installed on the throne of Hapalla by the Hittite ruler". From the subsequent treaty of Kupanta-Kurunta, we learn that Targasnalli was still on the throne of Hapalla around 1310 BC.

===== Muwatalli II =====
The second ruler of Hapalla, a certain Ura-Hattusa, who appears in Alaksandu's treaty of 1280 BC, where the Hittite ruler Muwatalli II, son of Mursili, lists the four sovereigns of the surviving Arzawa kingdoms (What remained of Arzawa had been annexed by Mira) mentioning Ura-Hattusa as king of Hapalla. It is uncertain whether the two rulers came from the same family.

After this treaty, there are no more references to the kingdom of Hapalla.

It is now believed by scholars that towards the end of the Hittite empire (c. 1230 BC), King Tudhaliya IV established the State of Mira as the regional supervisor of Western Anatolia, with Hapalla most likely under its supervision.

== Kings of Hapalla ==
| King | Dates | Overlord |
|---|---|---|
| Targasnalli | c. 1319 – c. 1310 BC | Mursili II |
| Ura-Hattusa | c. 1280 BC | Muwatalli II |
