= Madduwatta =

Late Bronze Age warlord

Anatolia during the Late Bronze Age

Madduwatta (or Madduwattas; fl. c. 1400 BC) was a Late Bronze Age warlord who conquered a portion of southwest Anatolia. He is known from the Hittite text known as the Indictment of Madduwatta.

== Textual background ==
Madduwatta is known solely from the Indictment of Madduwatta (CTH 147), a fragmentary Hittite text which recounts his exploits from a Hittite perspective. The Indictment was written during the reign of the Hittite king Arnuwanda I, but much of the text addresses events from the reign of his predecessor Tudhaliya I/II and frequently cites or quotes earlier documents which do not survive. It is unclear whether it was a legal document, a diplomatic warning, or something else, and the extant copy contains errors and corrections which seem to suggest that it was merely a draft.

The Indictment is notable for containing the earliest mention of Ahhiyawa, which it renders as "Ahhiya", as well as the name Attarissiya, one of only two certain Ahhiyawan personal names in the surviving corpus. It provides historical context about the growth of Mycenean Greek power in Anatolia, as well as the Hittites' strategy for maintaining their tenuous influence on the Aegean coast.

== Life ==
Madduwatta began his career as a "man of importance" in an unknown western Anatolian polity, within the Hittite sphere of influence but beyond its direct control. During the reign of the Hittite king Tudhaliya I/II, he was attacked by an Ahhiyawan warlord named Attarissiya and forced to flee. He was granted asylum by Tudhaliya, to whom he took an oath of allegiance. Madduwatta was installed as ruler of Zippasla and the Siyanta River Land, while accepting treaty obligations which precluded establishing diplomatic relations or undertaking military enterprises except through the Hittites.

Madduwatta repeatedly violated this agreement. Despite Tudhaliya's explicit prohibition, he undertook a disastrous invasion of neighboring Arzawa, at the time ruled by the anti-Hittite king Kupanta-Kurunta. Madduwatta not only failed to conquer Arzawa, but needed Hittite reinforcements to bail him out. Shortly afterwards, he neglected his treaty obligation to counter anti-Hittite activity in the region, ignoring a second incursion by Attarissiya and once again requiring Hittite military assistance.

In the subsequent period, Madduwatta undertook a number of successful military exploits, and seems to have established control over a sizable chunk of southwestern Anatolia. He attacked and occupied Hittite subject lands including Hapalla and unidentified territories called Iyalanti, Zumarri, and Wallarimma which may have been part of Lukka. He refused extradition requests from the Hittite king, and incited anti-Hittite rebellion among other vassal states:

Then because Madduwatta did not go to Dalauwa for battle, but in fact wrote away to the people of Dalauwa (saying): "[The troops] of Hatti have just gone to Hinduwa for battle. Block the road before them and attack them!"... They proceeded to block the way [of our] troops and routed them. They killed Kisnapili and Partahulla. But [Madduwatta] laughed out loud about them.

Madduwatta also formed alliances with former enemies. He sought a marriage alliance with the Arzawan king Kupanta-Kurunta, though he justified this move to the Hittites by claiming that it was merely a covert assassination attempt. He then partnered with Attarissiya to raid the island of Alashiya, which the Hittites claimed as their own. In response to Hittite protests, he claimed ignorance:

Madduwatta said thus: "... the father of his Majesty [had never informed] me, [nor] had his Majesty ever informed [me] (thus): 'The land of Alasiya is mine—recognize it as such!'"

The surviving text of the Indictment ends with a verbal confrontation between Madduwatta and an envoy sent by Arnuwanda I. What became of Madduwatta is unknown.

== See also ==
- Assuwa
- Kingdom of Mira
- Luwians
- Piyamaradu
- Seha River Land
