= Pitassa =

Undiscovered Bronze Age city in Anatolia

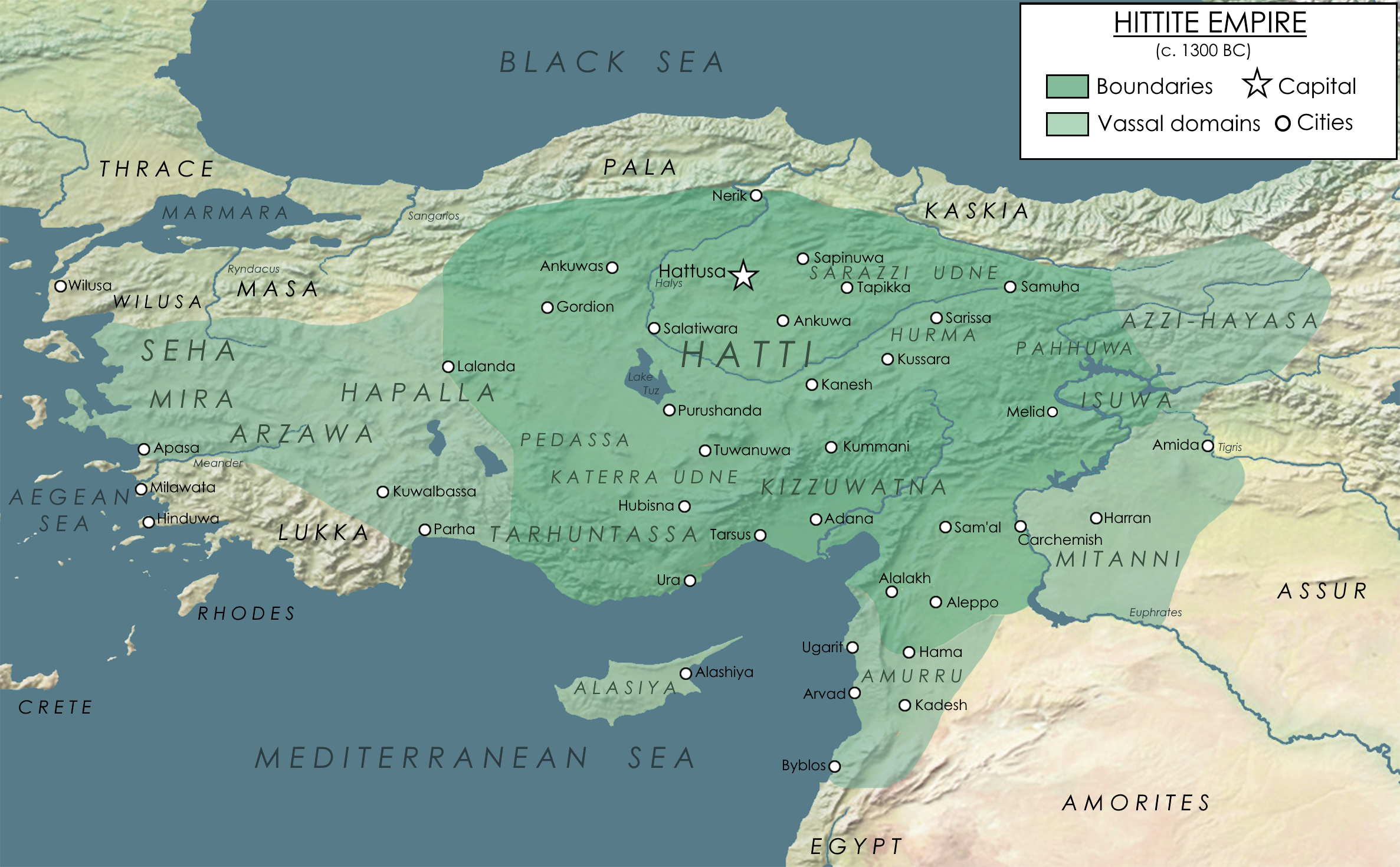
Map of the Hittite Empire at its greatest extent, with Hittite rule c. 1300 BC

Pitassa is an as-yet undiscovered frontier land/city in western Anatolia, mentioned in Bronze Age archives at Hattusa. The name seems Luwian or considered Hittite.

== Etymology ==
"[T]he place name Pedessa is presumably the derivative of the equivalent of the Hitt.[ite] peda- place in Luwian, where the form pida- is postulated."

== Location ==
Pitassa lay somewhere west of the Salt Lake. It has been described as "the region at the 'foot' of the Sultan Mountains and stretching northward all the way to the Sakarya River and Gordion near Polatlı."

It occasionally formed the border between Hatti and various iterations of Arzawa. Another account referred to it as an imperial geographical designation (also called Pedassa) for the region found at the foot of the Sultan Mountains and extend northwards all the way to the Sakarya River and Gordion near Polath. It is also described as part of the region of Classical Lycaonia, which was located east of the Salt Lake.

== History ==
=== Arnuwanda I ===
Madduwatta wrested Pitassa from Arnuwanda I in the late 15th century BC. This figure was described as a freebooter and he forced the inhabitants of Pitassa to swear loyalty to himself.

=== Suppiluliuma I ===
Decades later Suppiluliuma I retook it while he was the crown prince acting in behalf of his father. The city was included in the list of conquered territories cited in the Deeds of Suppiluliuma. Mashuiluwa of Mira then incited it to revolt c. 1310 BC, after which Mursili II moved upon it and resubjugated it.

=== Muwatalli II ===
One of the earliest records of Pitassa involve the account of Egyptian scribes of the battle of Qadesh in 1275 B.C. During the conflict, Pitassa provided a contingent that served under the Hittite army. In these documents, it was referred to as P-d-s or the equivalent of Pitassa and was located in the area of Salt Lake (Tuz Golu) and the plains of Konya. The city during this period was recorded as a subject of the kingdom of Hatti.

=== Tudhaliya IV ===
Pitassa is cited in several historical documents such as the case of Hittite treaties that included the descriptions of boundaries and towns. These include the treaty between Tudhaliya IV of Hatti and his cousin Kurunta around 1240-1210 BC, which described the latter's frontiers in the following words:

In the direction of the land of Pitassa, his frontier city of Sanantarwa, but the kantanna of Zarniya belongs to the land of the Hulaya River, while Sanantarwa belongs to the land of Pitassa.
