= Battle of Kadesh =

1274 BC Egyptian-Hittite battle

Coordinates: 34.57°N 36.51°E

- Part of the second Syrian campaign of Ramesses II
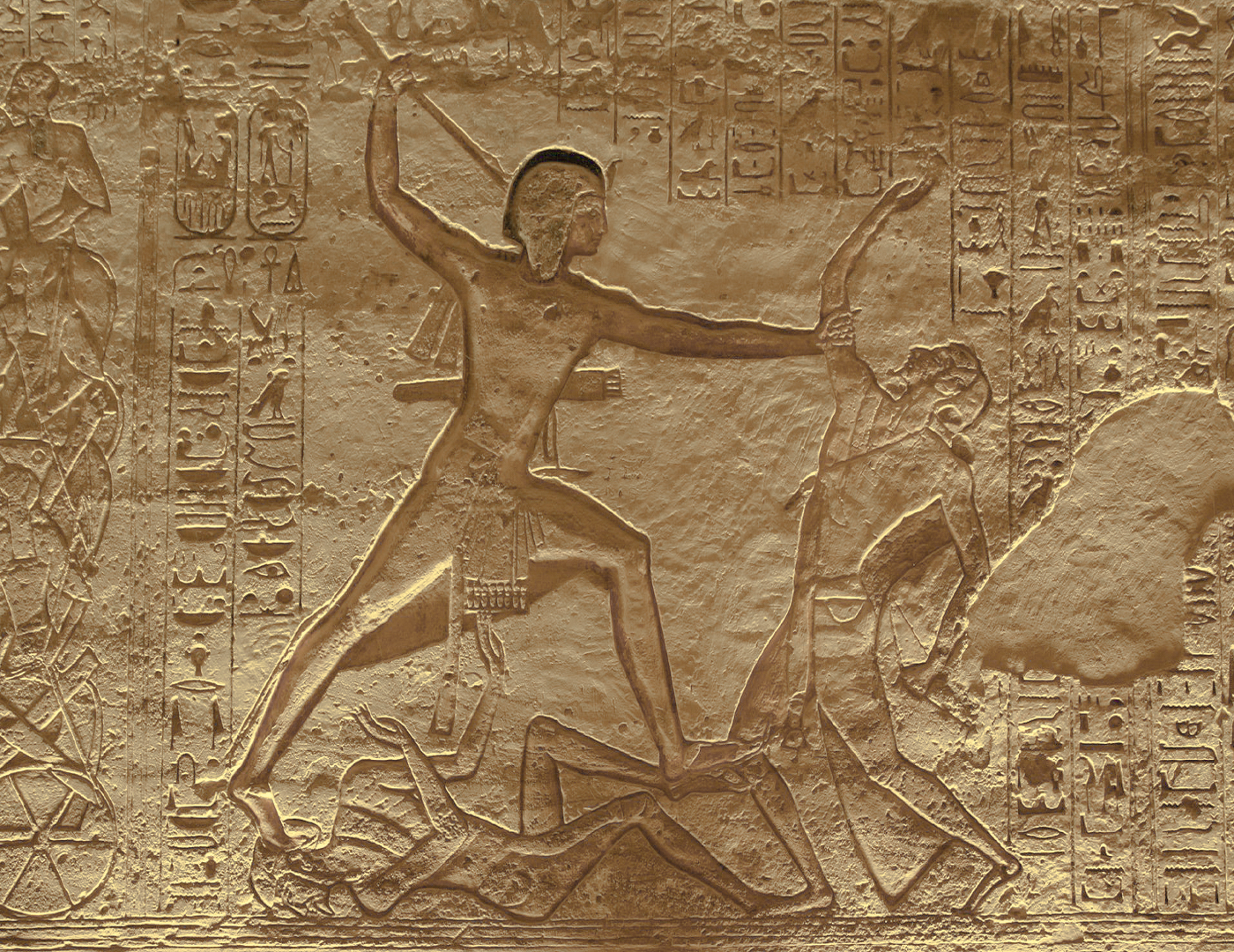
- Depiction of Ramesses II slaying one enemy while trampling another, from a rock-cut relief at Abu Simbel
Date	Year 5 III Shemu day 9 of Ramesses II; May 1274 BC
Location	Orontes River, near Kadesh (modern-day Lebanon–Syria border)
Result	Inconclusive

Belligerents
Egyptian Empire	Hittite Empire

Commanders and leaders
Ramesses II	Muwatalli II; Ḫattušili III; Talmi-Sarruma of Aleppo

Strength
16,000 infantry; 2,000 chariots; 4,000 charioteers	15,000–40,000 infantry (not engaged); 2,500 chariots; 9,000–11,100 charioteers

Casualties and losses
Unknown (presumed heavy)	Unknown (~2,000 chariots destroyed)

The Battle of Kadesh was a major military conflict in the early 13th century BC, between the attacking Ramesses II of the Egyptian Empire and defending Muwatalli II of the Hittite Empire. In the previous year, Ramesses II had invaded the neighboring province of Amurru. At the Orontes River, the armies engaged each other just upstream of Lake Homs and near the stronghold of Kadesh, along what is today the Lebanon–Syria border.

The battle occurred on Year 5 III Shemu day 9 of Ramesses II, generally dated to May 1274 BCE based on the standard Egyptian chronology (low chronology; the high chronology has the date about 20 years earlier). It is the earliest pitched battle in recorded history for which details of tactics and formations are known, and believed to be the largest battle ever fought involving chariots, numbering at a total of 5,000 to 6,000. After being outmaneuvered, ambushed, and surrounded, Ramesses II personally led a charge through the Hittite ranks with his bodyguard. He broke through and, with the arrival of a rearguard Egyptian force, managed to reverse the disaster and drive off the Hittites. The outcome is considered a stalemate.

== Background ==
After expelling the Hyksos' 15th Dynasty around 1550 BC, the rulers of the New Kingdom of Egypt became more aggressive in reclaiming control of their state's borders. Thutmose I, Thutmose III, and his son and coregent Amenhotep II fought battles from Megiddo north to the Orontes, including conflict with Kadesh.

Many Egyptian accounts between c. 1400 and 1300 BC reflect the general destabilization of Djahy, a region in southern Canaan. During the reigns of Thutmose IV and Amenhotep III, Egypt continued to lose territory to the Mitanni in northern Syria.

During the late Eighteenth Dynasty, the Amarna letters tell the story of the decline of Egyptian influence in the region. The Egyptians showed little interest in this region until almost the end of the dynasty. Horemheb (d. 1292 BC), the last ruler of this dynasty, campaigned in this region, finally beginning to turn Egyptian interest back to the area.

This process continued in the Nineteenth Dynasty. Like his father Ramesses I, Seti I was a military commander who set out to restore Egypt's empire to the days of the Eighteenth Dynasty pharaohs almost a century before. Inscriptions on the Karnak walls record the details of his campaigns into Canaan and ancient Syria. He took 20,000 men and reoccupied abandoned Egyptian posts and garrisoned cities. He made an informal peace with the Hittites, took control of coastal areas along the Mediterranean Sea, and continued campaigning in Canaan. A second campaign led to his capture of Kadesh and the Amurru kingdom. His son and heir, Ramesses II, campaigned with him. Historical records show a large weapons order by Ramesses II in the year before the expedition he led to Kadesh in his fifth regnal year.

At some point, both regions may have lapsed back under Hittite control. What exactly happened to Amurru is disputed. Hittitologist Trevor R. Bryce suggests, that although it may have fallen once again under Hittite control, it is more likely Amurru remained a Hittite vassal state.

The immediate antecedents to the Battle of Kadesh were the early campaigns of Ramesses II into Canaan. In the fourth year of his reign, he marched north into Syria to recapture Amurru or as a probing effort to confirm his vassals' loyalty and explore the terrain for possible battlegrounds. In the spring of the fifth year of his reign, in May 1274 BC, Ramesses II launched a campaign from his capital Pi-Ramesses (modern Qantir). The army moved beyond the fortress of Tjaru on the Horus Military Route and along the coast leading to Gaza.

The recovery of Amurru was Muwatalli II's stated motivation for marching south to confront the Egyptians.

== Contending forces ==
The Egyptian Empire under Ramesses II (green) bordering on the Hittite Empire (red) at the height of its power in c. 1279 BC.

Ramesses led an army of four divisions: Amun, Re, Set, and the apparently newly-formed Ptah division.

There was also a poorly documented troop called the nrrn (Ne'arin or Nearin), who were possibly Canaanite military mercenaries or Egyptians, that Ramesses II had left in Amurru in order to secure the port of Sumur. This division would come to play a critical role in the battle. Also significant was the presence of Sherden troops fighting for the Egyptian army. This is the first record of them as Egyptian mercenaries. They would play an increasingly significant role in Late Bronze Age history, ultimately appearing among the Sea Peoples that ravaged the east Mediterranean at the end of the Bronze Age. Healy in Armies of the Pharaohs observes:

It is not possible to be precise about the size of the Egyptian chariot force at Kadesh though it could not have numbered less than 2,000 vehicles spread through the corps of Amun, Re, Ptah and Sutekh, assuming that approx. 500 machines were allocated to each corps. To this we may need to add those of the Ne'arin, for if they were not native Egyptian troops their number may not have been formed from chariots detached from the army corps.

On the Hittite side, King Muwatalli II had mustered several of his allies, among them Rimisharrinaa, the king of Aleppo. Ramesses II recorded a long list of 19 Hittite allies brought to Kadesh by Muwatalli. This list is of considerable interest to Hittitologists, as it reflects the extent of Hittite influence at the time.

== Battle ==
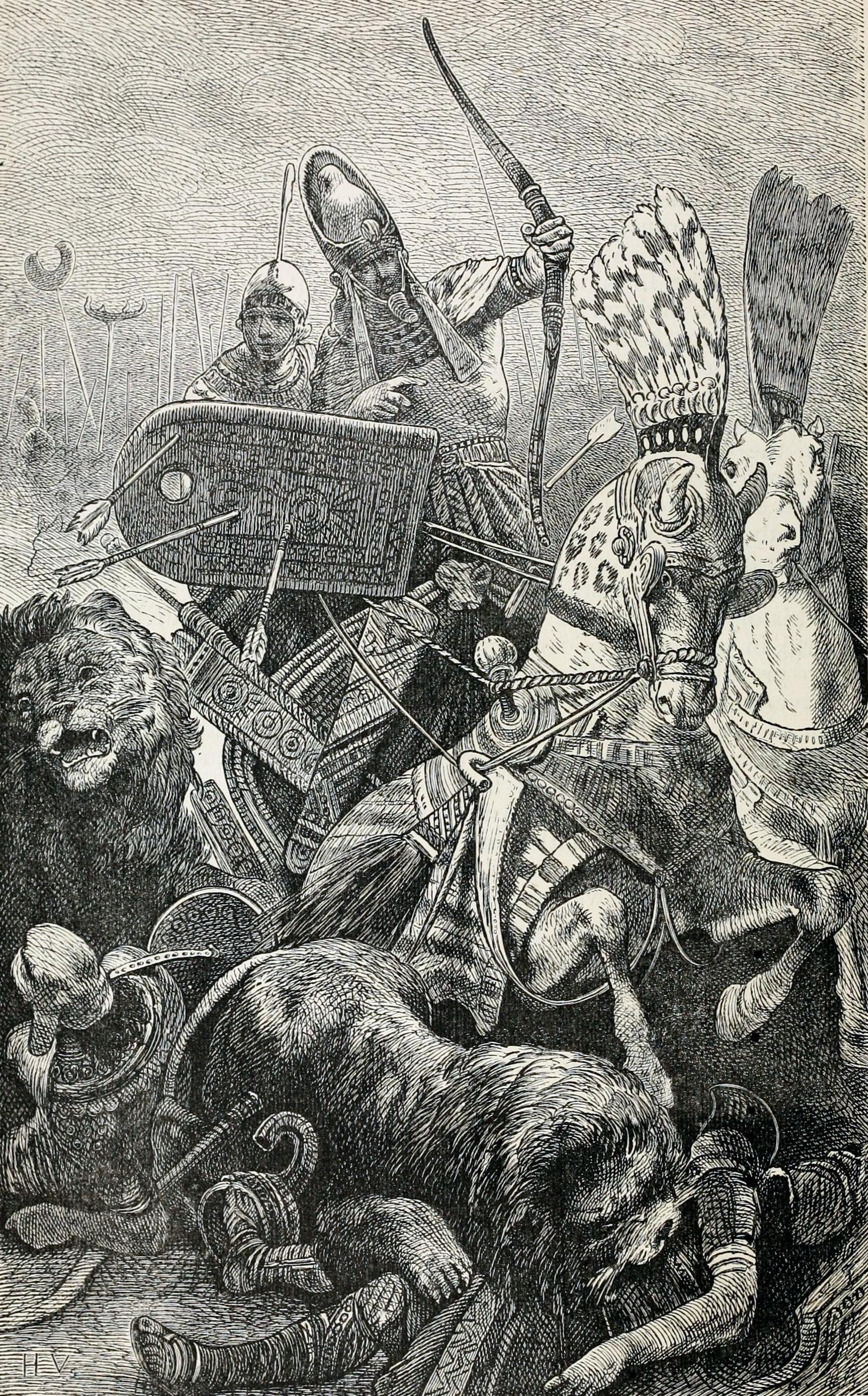
Rameses II in the Battle of Khadesh.

Muwatalli had positioned his troops behind "Old Kadesh". Ramesses II was misled by two captured nomads who said the Hittite army was still far off at Aleppo. The nomads were Hittite spies sent to mislead the pharaoh.

Ramesses ordered his forces to set up camp. He marched hastily towards Kadesh, completely unaware of the large enemy force waiting for him.

Ramesses II describes his arrival on the battlefield in the two principal inscriptions concerning the battle, the so-called "Poem" and the "Bulletin":

(From the "Poem") Now then, his majesty had prepared his infantry, his chariotry, and the Sherden of his majesty's capturing... in the Year 5, 2nd month of the third season, day 9, his majesty passed the fortress of Sile. [and entered Canaan] ... His infantry went on the narrow passes as if on the highways of Egypt. Now after days had passed after this, then his majesty was in Ramses Meri-Amon, the town which is in the Valley of the Cedar.

His majesty proceeded northward. After his majesty reached the mountain range of Kadesh, then his majesty went forward... and he crossed the ford of the Orontes, with the first division of Amon (named) "He Gives Victory to User-maat-Re Setep-en-Re". His majesty reached the town of Kadesh... The division of Amon was on the march behind him; the division of Re was crossing the ford in a district south of the town of Shabtuna at the distance of one iter from the place where his majesty was; the division of Ptah was on the south of the town of Arnaim; the division of Set was marching on the road. His majesty had formed the first ranks of battle of all the leaders of his army, while they were [still] on the shore in the land of Amurru.

[From the "Bulletin"] Year 5, 3rd month of the third season, day 9, under the majesty of (Ramesses II)... The lord proceeded northward, and his majesty arrived at a vicinity south of the town of Shabtuna.

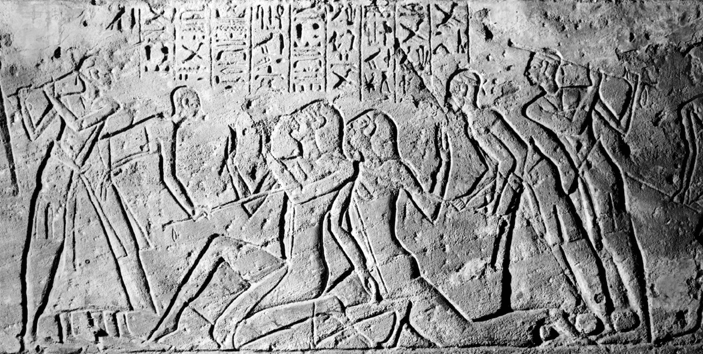
Shasu spies shown being beaten by the Egyptians.

As Ramesses II and the Egyptian advance guard were about 11 kilometers from Kadesh, south of Shabtuna, he met two Shasu nomads who told him that the Hittite king was "in the land of Aleppo, on the north of Tunip" 200 kilometers away, where, the Shasu said, he was "(too much) afraid of Pharaoh, L.P.H., to come south". This was, according to Egyptian texts, a false report ordered by the Hittites "with the aim of preventing the army of His Majesty from drawing up to combat with the foe of Hatti". An Egyptian scout then arrived at the camp bringing two Hittite prisoners. The prisoners revealed that the entire Hittite army and the Hittite king were actually close at hand:

When they had been brought before Pharaoh, His Majesty asked, "Who are you?" They replied "We belong to the king of Hatti. He has sent us to spy on you." Then His Majesty said to them, "Where is he, the enemy from Hatti? I had heard that he was in the land of Aleppo." They of Tunip replied to His Majesty, "Lo, the king of Hatti has already arrived, together with the many countries who are supporting him... They are armed with their infantry and their chariots. They have their weapons of war at the ready. They are more numerous than the grains of sand on the beach. Behold, they stand equipped and ready for battle behind the old city of Kadesh."

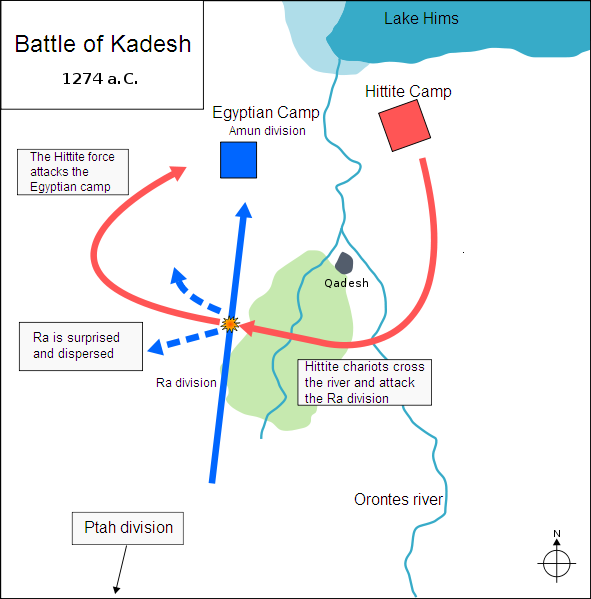
The Hittite chariots attack the Ra division.

After this, Ramesses II called his princes to meet with him and discuss the fault of his governors and officials in not informing the position of Muwatalli II and the Hittite army.

Ramesses was alone with his bodyguard and the Amun division. The vizier was ordered to hasten the arrival of the Ptah and Seth divisions. The Ra division had almost arrived at the camp. While Ramesses II was talking with the princes and ordering the Amun division to prepare for battle, the Hittite chariots crossed the river and charged the middle of the Ra division as they were making their way toward Ramesses II's position. The Ra division was caught in the open and scattered in all directions. Some fled northward to the Amun camp, all the while being pursued by Hittite chariots.

The Hittite chariotry rounded north and attacked the Egyptian camp through the Amun shield wall, creating panic among the Amun division.

The momentum of the Hittite attack began to wane as chariots were impeded by and in some cases crashing into obstacles in the large Egyptian camp. In the Egyptian account, Ramesses describes himself as being deserted and surrounded by enemies: "No officer was with me, no charioteer, no soldier of the army, no shield-bearer[.]"

Ramesses II was able to defeat the initial attackers and return to the Egyptian lines: "I was before them like Set in his moment. I found the mass of chariots in whose midst I was, scattering them before my horses[.]" The pharaoh, forced into a desperate fight for his life, called upon his god Amun and faced the enemy. Ramesses II personally led several charges into the Hittite ranks along with his personal guard, some chariots from his Amun division, and survivors from the routed Ra division.

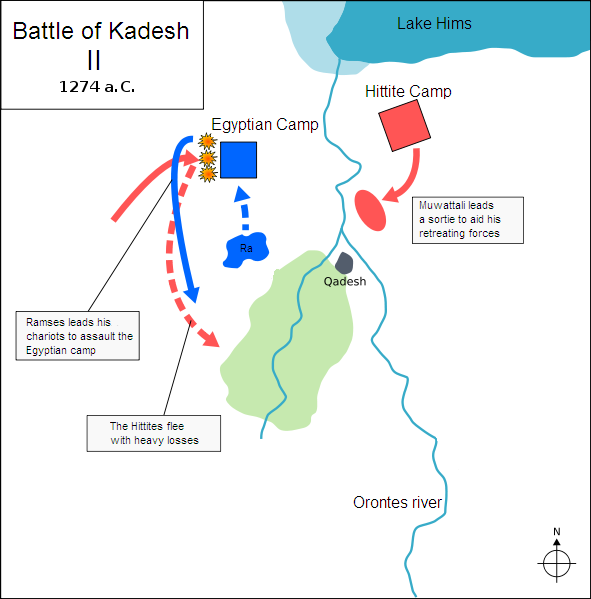
Ramesses counterattacks.

The Hittites, believing their enemies to be routed, stopped to plunder the Egyptian camp. They were subsequently driven back towards the Orontes River and away from the camp by an Egyptian counterattack. In the ensuing pursuit, Hittite chariots were overtaken and dispatched by lighter Egyptian chariots.

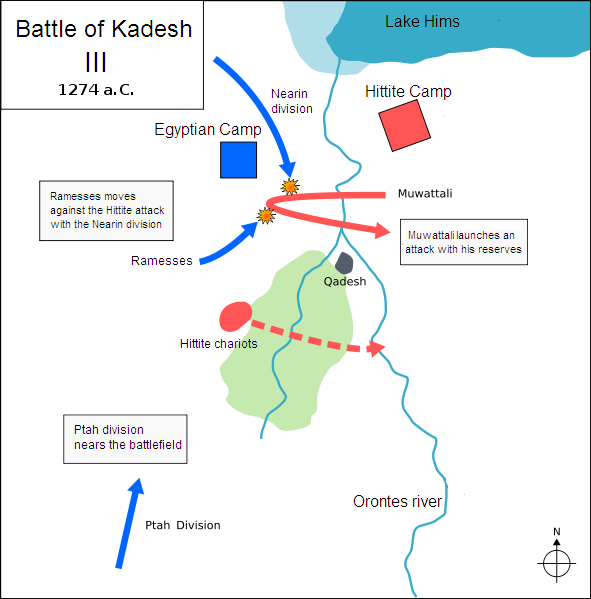
Final phase of the battle.

Having suffered this significant reversal in the battle, Muwatalli II still commanded a large force of reserve chariotry and infantry, as well as the walls of the town. As the retreat reached the river, he ordered another thousand chariots to counter-attack, led by high nobles close to the king. As the Hittite forces approached the same Egyptian camp again, the Ne'arin troop contingent from Amurru suddenly arrived, surprising the Hittites. Finally, the Ptah division arrived from the south, threatening the Hittite rear.

After six unsuccessful Hittite charges, their forces were almost surrounded and the survivors were pinned against the Orontes. The remaining Hittite elements were forced to abandon their chariots and attempt to swim the river "as fast as crocodiles" (according to Egyptian accounts). Many drowned.

Following the battle, the Hittites were routed, but they held on to Kadesh.

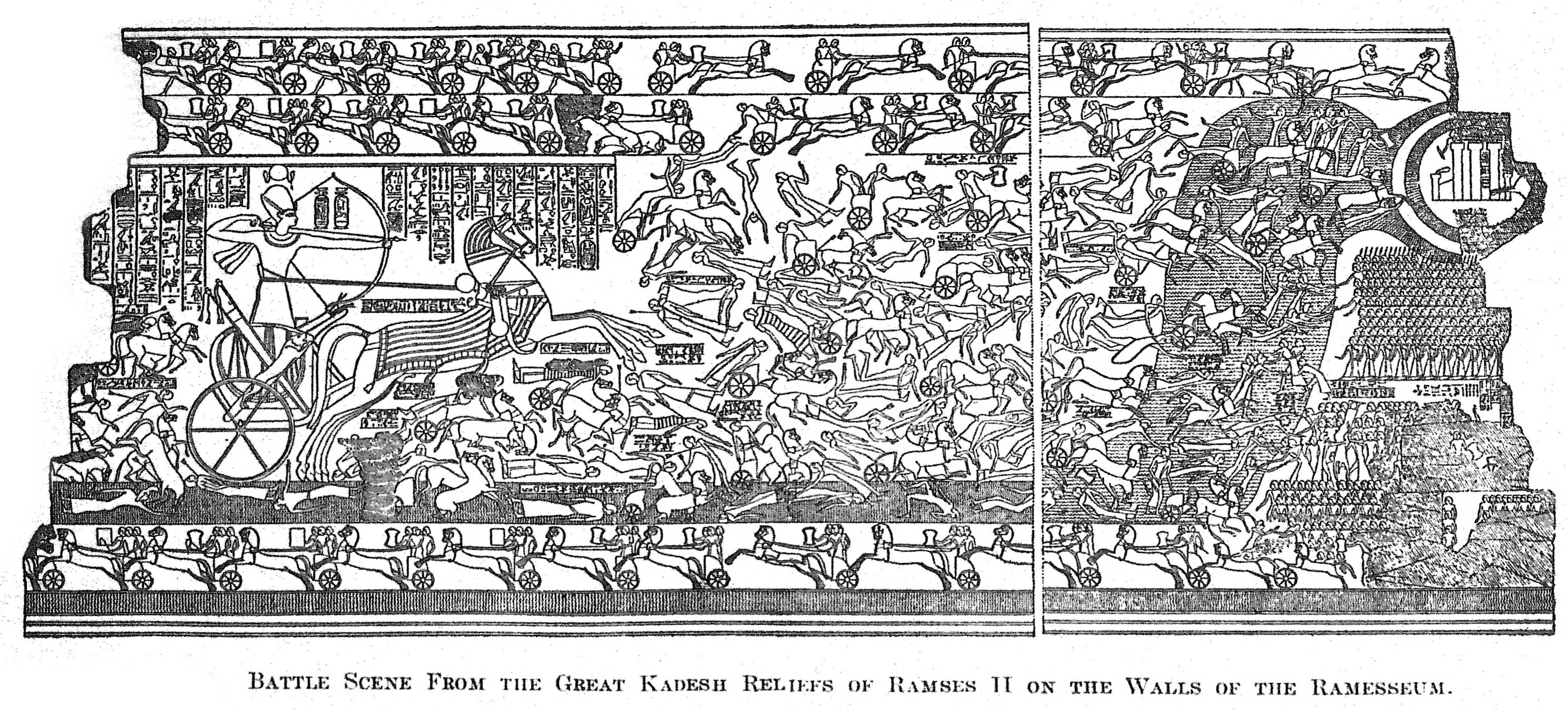
Battle scene from the Great Kadesh reliefs of Ramses II on the walls of the Ramesseum

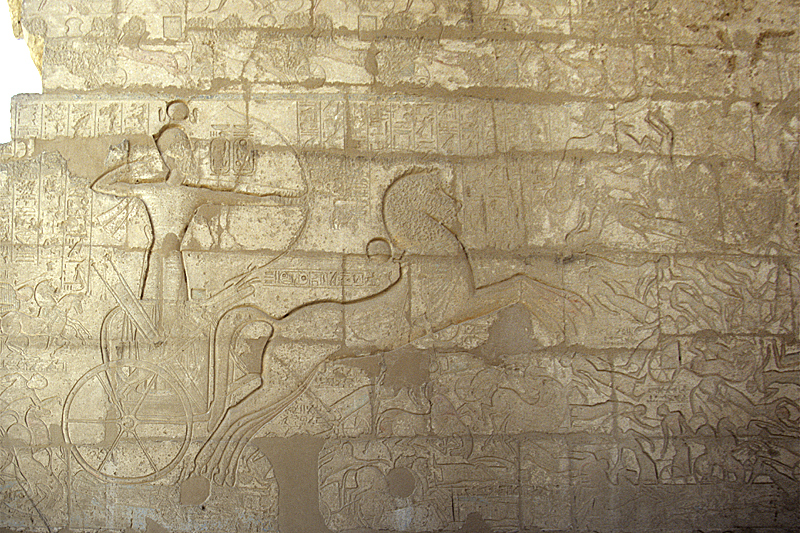
The original relief from the Ramesseum

== Aftermath ==
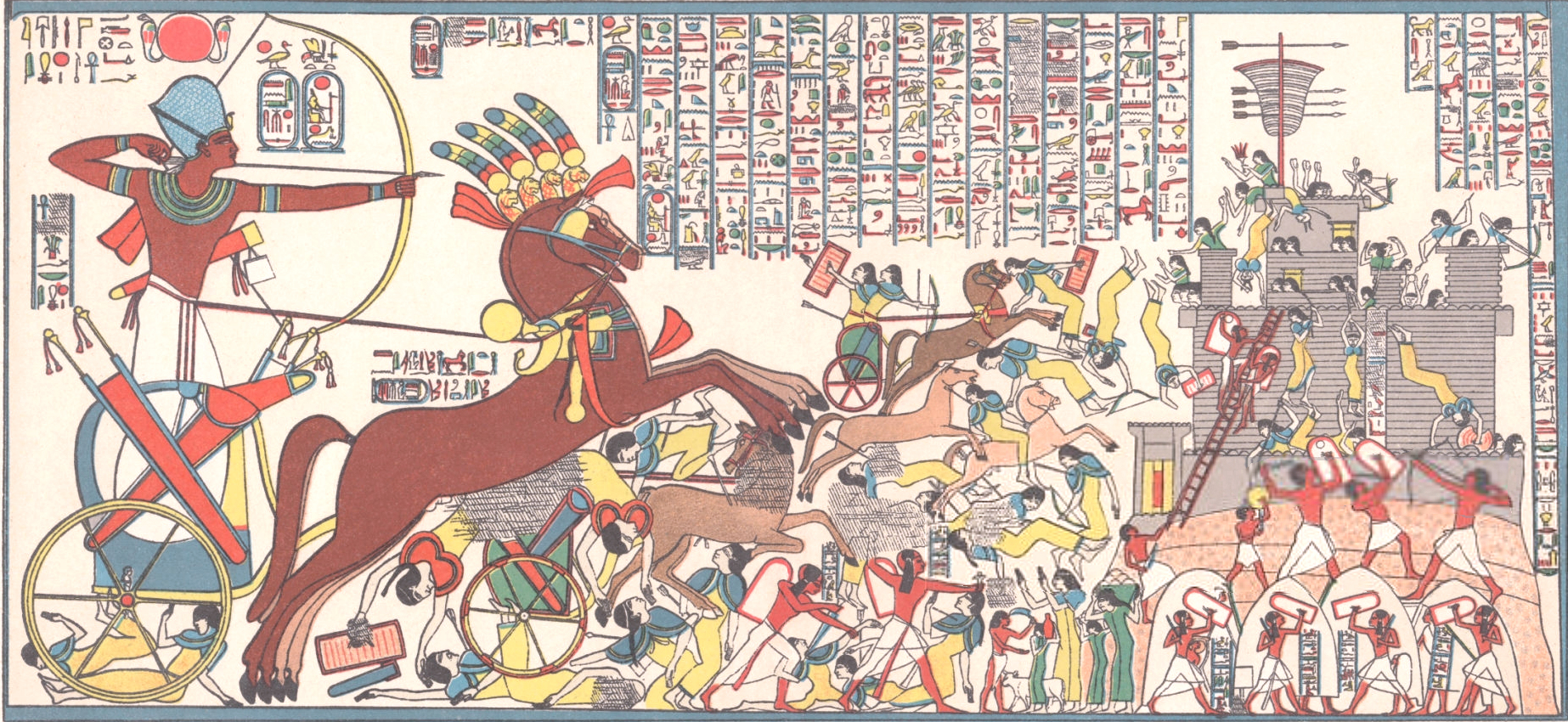
The Siege of Dapur

Unable to support a long siege of the walled city of Kadesh, Ramesses gathered his troops and headed south towards Damascus and ultimately back to Egypt. Ramesses proclaimed he had routed his enemies and that he had not attempted to capture Kadesh. The battle was a personal triumph for Ramesses. After moving into the ambush, facing defeat and death, the king had managed to rally his scattered troops and save the day. The following day, the Egyptians and Hittites faced off directly, in a battle that resulted in stalemate.

Hittite records from Hattusa tell a different conclusion to the conflict, in which Ramesses was forced to depart from Kadesh in defeat. Modern historians conclude that the battle ended in a draw from a practical point of view. It is held as a turning point for the Egyptians, who had developed new technologies and rearmed against years of territorial incursions by the Hittites.

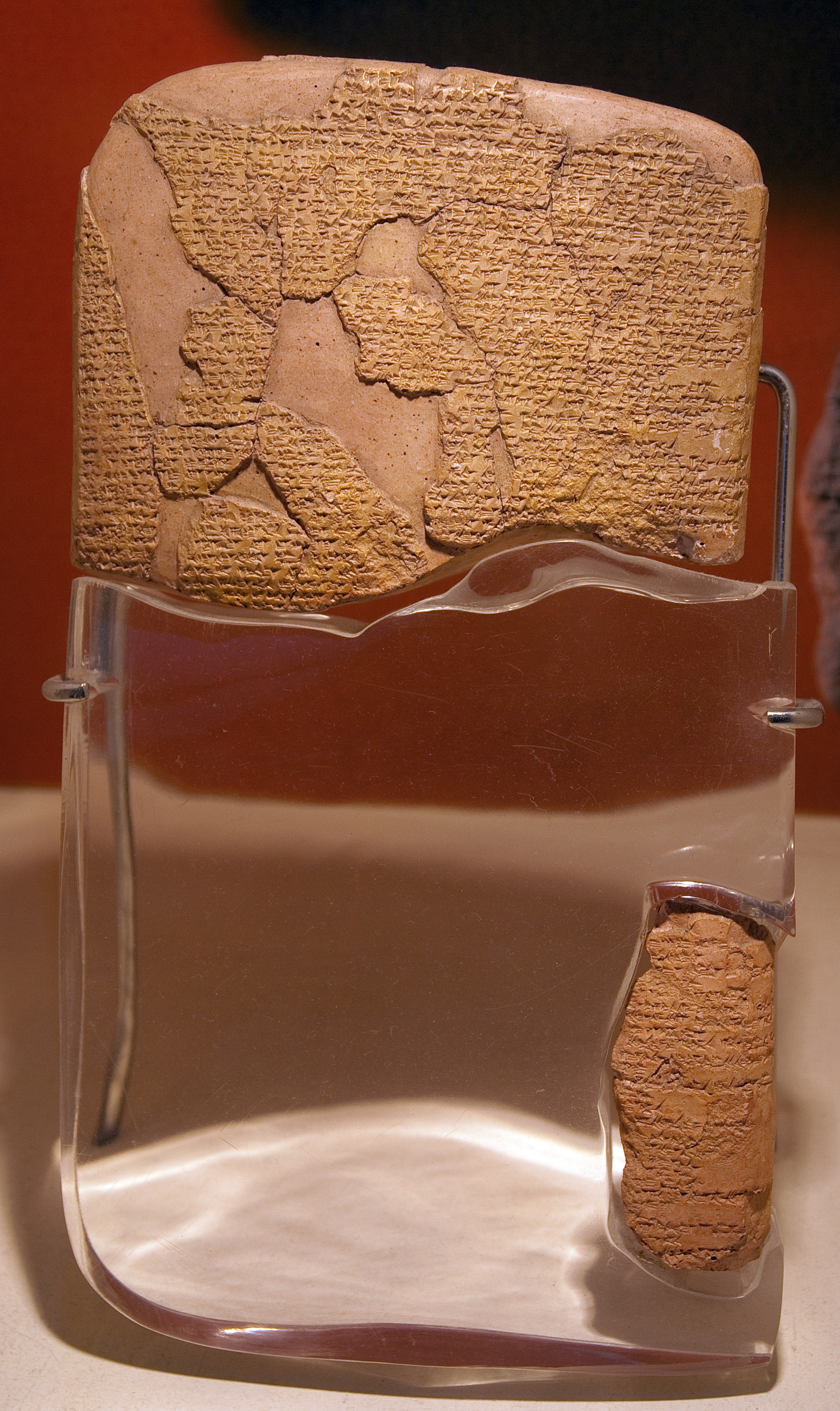
The Egyptian–Hittite peace treaty, on display at the Istanbul Archaeology Museum, is believed to be the earliest recorded example of a written international agreement.

The Hittite king, Muwatalli II, continued to campaign as far south as the Egyptian province of Upi (Apa), which he captured and placed under the control of his brother Hattusili, the future Hattusili III. Egypt's sphere of influence in Asia was now restricted to Canaan, but the region was threatened for a time by revolts among Egypt's vassal states in the Levant. Ramesses was compelled to embark on a series of campaigns

In the eighth and ninth years of his reign, Ramesses extended his military successes. This time, he successfully captured the Hittite-ruled cities of Dapur and Tunip, where no Egyptian soldier had been seen since the time of Thutmose III almost 120 years earlier.

Ramesses's victory proved ephemeral. The thin strip of territory pinched between Amurru and Kadesh was not a defensible possession. Within a year, it had returned to Hittite control. Ramesses had to march against Dapur once more in his tenth year. Neither Egypt nor Hatti could decisively defeat the other in the region.

An official peace treaty with the new Hittite king Hattusili III was signed some 15 years after the Battle of Kadesh, in the 21st year of Ramesses II's reign (1258 BC). This concluded the borderland conflicts. The treaty was inscribed on a silver tablet, of which a clay copy was found in the Hittite capital Hattusa, now in Turkey, and is on display at the Istanbul Archaeology Museum. A large replica hangs on a wall at the headquarters of the United Nations, as the earliest international peace treaty known to historians. Its text, in the Hittite version, appears in the links below. An Egyptian version survives on papyrus.

Trevor Bryce states that both sides claimed victory. Ramesses got the upper-hand at the end of Kadesh, but failed to retake Amurru and Qadesh which the dispute were about. Essentially describing an Egyptian tactical victory at Kadesh's battlefield by preventing the Hittites from defeating the Egyptians, but a Hittite strategic victory as it kept control over the disputed territory.

== Documentation ==
There is more evidence in the form of texts and wall reliefs for this battle than for any other in the Ancient Near East. Almost all of it is from an Egyptian perspective. The first scholarly report and reconstruction of the battle was done by James Henry Breasted in 1903, based on Egyptian sources.

Egyptian influence over Amurru and Qadesh seems to have been lost forever.

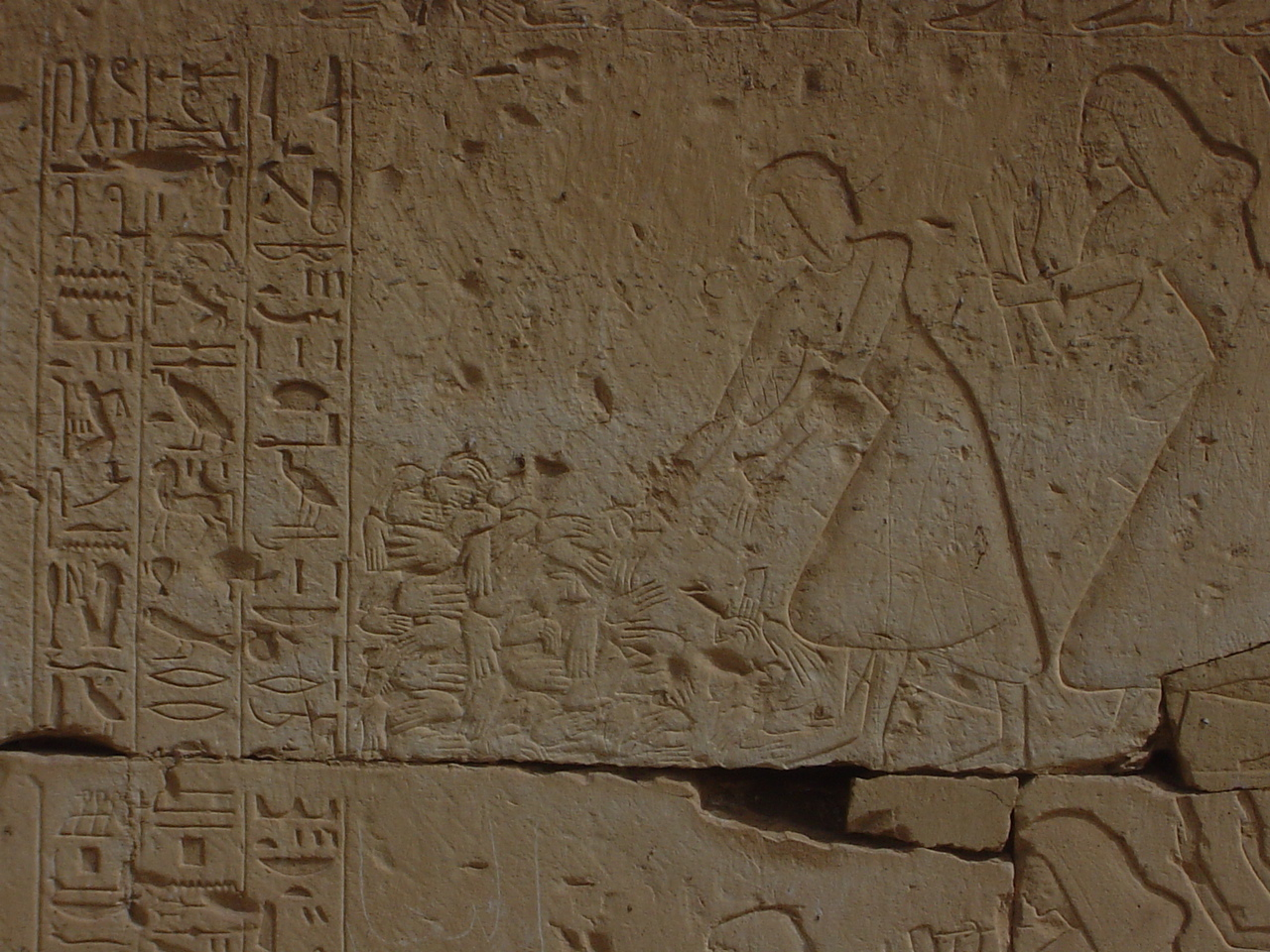
Counting of hands at the Battle of Kadesh (from Abydos)

The main source of information is in the Egyptian record. The bombastic nature of Ramesses' version is recognized. The Egyptian version of the battle is recorded in two primary forms, known as the Poem and the Bulletin. The Poem has been questioned as actual verse, as opposed to a prose account similar to that recorded by other pharaohs. The Bulletin is a caption accompanying the reliefs. The inscriptions are repeated multiple times (seven for the Bulletin and eight for the Poem, in temples in Abydos, Temple of Luxor, Karnak, Abu Simbel and the Ramesseum).

In addition to these narratives, numerous small captions point out elements of the battle. Besides the inscriptions, there are textual occurrences preserved in Papyrus Raifet and Papyrus Sallier III, and a letter from Ramesses to Hattusili III written in response to a complaint by Hattusili about the pharaoh's claims of victory in the battle.

Hittite references to the battle, including the above letter, have been found at Hattusa, but no annals have been discovered that might describe it as part of a campaign. Instead, there are various references made to it in the context of other events. That is especially true of Hattusili III for whom the battle marked an important milestone in his career.

=== Hittite allies ===
Sources: Goetze, A., "The Hittites and Syria (1300–1200 B.C.)", in Cambridge Ancient History (1975) p. 253; Gardiner, Alan, The Kadesh Inscriptions of Ramesses II (1975) pp. 57ff.; Breasted, James Henry, Ancient Records of Egypt; Historical Records (1906) pp. 125ff.; Lichtheim, Miriam, Ancient Egyptian Literature, Vol. 2: The New Kingdom (1978), pp. 57ff.

Egyptian Name	Location
Ḥt	Ḥatti (central Anatolia)
Nhrn	Naharin = Mitanni
I҆rṭw	Arzawa (western Anatolia)
Pds	Pitassa (central Anatolia)
Drdny	Dardania (allies of the Trojans, northwest Anatolia)
Ms	Masa (Mysia, northwest Anatolia)
Krkš	Karkisa Possibly Caria in southwest Anatolia
Krkmš	Carchemish, in Syria
Qd	A poorly defined area in northern Syria
Qdš	Kadesh (in Syria)
Ꜥkrṭ	Ugarit (in north Syria)
Mwšꜣnt	Mushanet (Unknown) Possibly Mushki or Moschoi (Phrygians)
Kškš	Kaska (northern Anatolia)
Lk	Lukka lands (Lycia and Caria, southwest Anatolia)
Qḍwdn	Kizzuwatna (Cilicia)
Nwgs	Nuḥḥašši (in Syria)
I҆rwnt (sic!)	Arawanna (In Anatolia)
Ḥlb	Ḥalba (Aleppo, in Syria. Led by its king, Talmi-Sarruma, grandson of Suppiluliuma I.)
I҆ns	Inesa (Unknown, possibly Neša in central Anatolia)

In addition to these allies, the Hittite king also hired the services of some of the local Shasu tribes.

=== Hittite fallen ===
Source: Gardiner, Alan, The Kadesh Inscriptions of Ramesses II (1975) pp. 39–41.

Name	Title
Spţr	Brother of Muwattalli
Trgnns	Charioteer
Grbts	Shield-bearer
Trgtţs	Troop-captain of those of Qbsw(?)
'Agm	Troop-captain
Kmyţ	A head of thr-warriors (infantry?)
Ḥrpsr	Royal scribe
Tydr	Chief of the bodyguard
Pys	Charioteer
Smrts	Charioteer
Rbsnn	Troop-captain of 'Inns.
Ḥmţrm	Brother of Muwattalli
Tdr	Head of the thr-warriors
Ţ..m	Shield-bearer(?)
Ţwţs	Troop-captain of 'Ins
Bnq(?)	Charioteer
[?]	[One further name and title, lost]

Several members of the royal family of Muwatalli II participated in the campaign. They were actively engaged in battle, not just commanding from afar. Hittite records indicate that at least two of his brothers were killed in the conflict (Spţr and Ḥmţrm). It is also assumed that a third brother Hattusili (future king Hattusili III) participated in the battle. Later texts describe him as an experienced military leader and governor of the northern regions (Hakpis), making it likely he was a military leader on the battlefield. Hattusili III also developed close relations with Ramesses II with intermarriages when peace was achieved, indicating a previous mutually respectful relationship between two heroes.

== See also ==
- Chariotry in ancient Egypt
- Egyptian–Hittite peace treaty
- Battle of Megiddo
