= Piyama-Kurunta =

Piyama-Kurunta (Hittite: 𒋧𒈠𒀭𒆗 SUM-ma-^{d}LAMMA) was a prince and regent for the last independent king of Arzawa, a Bronze Age kingdom of western Anatolia. The king of Arzawa Uhha-Ziti named his son "Gift of the god Kurunta", after a god (or hero) whose name had featured in the names of previous Arzawan kings.

== Life ==
In c. 1323 BC, based in the town Apasa, Uhha-Ziti rebelled against the Hittites and accepted that empire's refugees from Attarimma, Hu[wa]rsanassa, and Suruda. While the Hittite king Mursilis II was marching toward Arzawa, a meteor struck Apasa and wounded Uhha-Ziti. Uhha-Ziti then agreed on an alliance with the king of "Ahhiyuwa" and ordered Piyama-Kurunta to attack the realm of Mira, whose king Maskhuiluwa was married to Mursilis’ sister.

Piyama-Kurunta attacked and possibly destroyed the city of Impa in Mira, but the army of Mira repelled him. Piyama-Kurunta later faced off against Mursilis’ army at "Walma, at the river Astarpa" - and lost. Piyama-Kurunta followed his father, and his brother Tapalazunauli, in flight to the islands. Mursilis walked into Apasas apparently without a fight. The refugees meanwhile fled to the town or fortress Puranda. Uhha-Ziti died while Mursilis was encamped at the Astarpa, besieging Puranda.

Piyama-Kurunta's brother Tapalazunauli made a last attempt to rally support in Puranda. When this failed, Piyama-Kurunta saw that his cause was lost, so he and the King of Ahhiyawa made landfall to sue for peace. Mursilis deported Piyama-Kurunta to Hattusa. Piyama-Kurunta likely died there.
