= Kupanta-Kurunta =

King of Mira

Kupanta-Kurunta was a king of Mira known for his involvement in Hittite geopolitics. He was born in the 1330s or 1320s BC at Mira in western Anatolia, in one of the princely families. His father joined a coup against king Mašḫuiluwa. The Hittite king Suppiluliuma I married Mašḫuiluwa to his daughter Muwatti and reinstalled him. Kupanta-Kurunta's father apparently died or was exiled soon after. Mašḫuiluwa then asked Suppiluliuma's successor Mursili II if he could adopt Kupanta-Kurunta as a son.

Mira remained a Hittite ally against Uhha-Ziti of Arzawa; but two years after Mursili's eclipse (which would mean 1310 BC) Mira rebelled under influence from "Great-House-Father" (probably an adventurer from Masa). Mursili quashed this rebellion, transferred Mašḫuiluwa to a priesthood in Hittite territory, and installed Kupanta-Kurunta as king.

In the early 13th century BC, Muwatalli II signed a treaty with Alaksandu of Wilusa. In it, he informed Alaksandu that he viewed Kupanta-Kurunta as the son of Muwatti and so a member of the Hittite royal family.

Kupanta-Kurunta is possibly the recipient of the Milawata letter.

Kupanta-Kurunta apparently supported Hattusili III over Hattusili's nephew Urhi-Tessup, "Mursili III". After Hattusili attained the kingdom, Kupanta-Kurunta received a letter from Pharaoh Rameses II which was copied to Hattusili. In it, the Pharaoh reassured Kupanta-Kurunta that Egypt remained a full ally of Hatti and entertained no plans to aid Urhi-Tessup in any further adventures.
