= Lukka lands =

Ancient Anatolian region

The states formed by the Lukka (lower left) were located in south-west Anatolia/Asia Minor.

The Lukka lands (sometimes Luqqa lands) were an ancient region of Anatolia. They are known from Hittite and Egyptian texts, which viewed them as hostile. It is commonly accepted that the Bronze Age toponym Lukka is cognate with the Lycia of classical antiquity.

== Geography ==
Lukka was located in southwestern Anatolia. However, its exact extent is a matter of debate. Trevor Bryce has argued that the Lukka lands covered a large area including the regions later known as Lycaonia, Pisidia and Lycia. Other researchers, such as Ilya Yakubovich, have argued that Lukka was limited to Lycia and that "the Hittite kings did not regard Lukka as a state and...that this land was politically decentralized." Researcher Rostislav Oreshko argues that there were two centers of Lukkan power - one in the traditional location near Lycia and another located in the eastern part of the Troad - and that most of the Hittite records concern the latter.

== History ==
The Amarna letters mention Lukkan raids against the island kingdom of Alashiya in the mid-1300s BC, about the same time as Hittite texts praying to the Sun goddess of Arinna mention the Lukka lands along with Arawanna, Kalaspa and Pitassa as independent lands that had ceased paying tribute. They are mentioned prominently in the Hittite treaty with Alaksandu circa 1280 BC:

"Concerning army and chariotry, the agreement with you will be as follows: if My Sun campaigns in the direction of those lands – either towards Gargisa, (or Masa), or Lukka, or Warsiyalla – you too will campaign with me, together with your infantry and chariotry. Or if I dispatch an officer in the direction of these lands to go on a campaign, you will campaign there with (him) too."

Soldiers from the Lukka lands fought on the Hittite side in the famous Battle of Kadesh (c. 1274 BC) against the Egyptian Pharaoh Ramesses II. A century later, the Lukka had turned against the Hittites. The Hittite king Suppiluliuma II tried in vain to defeat the Lukka. They contributed to the collapse of the Hittite Empire. The Lukka are also known from texts in Ancient Egypt as one of the tribes of the Sea Peoples, who invaded Egypt and the Eastern Mediterranean in the 12th century BC.

== See also ==
- Ancient regions of Anatolia
- Arzawa
- Assuwa
- Lycians
- Madduwatta
