= Manapa-Tarhunta =

King of the Seha River Lands

- - King of Seha River Land
- Reign: c. 1320 BC
- Predecessor: Muwa-Walwis
- Successor: Manapa-Kurunta
- Father: Muwa-Walwis
- Mother: -

Manapa-Tarhunta was a king of Seha River Land in western Anatolia during the Late Bronze Age. Manapa-Tarhunta is known through the archives of the kings of Hattusas.

He was a younger son of King Muwa-Walwis of the Seha River Land, born ca. the 1330s BC.

== Reign ==
=== Exile ===
Muwa-Walwis died around the year 1323 BC and left his kingdom to Manapa-Tarhunta. His brothers, led by the eldest, Ura-Tarhunta, deposed Manapa-Tarhunta and drove him to Karkiya territory (which may be classical-era Caria). The infirm King of the Hittites, Arnuwanda II, aided by his younger brother (the future Mursili II), wrote to the Karkiya people requesting asylum for the king-in-exile. The people of Seha River revolted and invited Manapa-Tarhunta back.

=== Rebellion ===
On Arnuwanda's death that year, an otherwise unknown chieftain named Uhha-Ziti revolted against the Hittites in Arzawa to the Seha River's south. Uhha-Ziti convinced Manapa-Tarhunta to join the rebellion, but Mursilis II subsequently defeated the alliance and prepared to destroy the Seha River's cities. Manapa-Tarhunta paraded his mother and family before the Hittite king, tears flowing, so Mursilis II spared the Seha River and left Manapa-Tarhunta in charge.

The Treaty of Mursili II with Manapa-Tarhunta of Seha (CTH 69).

Soon after these incidents, Manapa-Tarhunta presumably authored the Manapa-Tarhunta letter.

=== Time of Muwatalli II ===
After the reigns of both Manapa-Tarhunta and Mursilis II, Mursilis's successor Muwatalli II wrote a treaty with Alaksandu of Wilusa which mentioned that Manapa-Kurunta was now king in the Seha River Land. There is no documentation of any disturbance in the succession, so it is assumed that the succession was patrilineal, and that it transferred peacefully from father to son.

=== Archive ===
- CTH 69 Treaty of Muršili II with Manapa-Tarḫunta of Šēḫa
- CTH 191 Letter from Manapa-Tarḫunta to the Hittite king
