= Uhha-Ziti =

Last independent king of Arzawa

Uhha-Ziti was the last independent king of Arzawa, a Bronze Age kingdom of western Anatolia around 1320 BC.

== Family ==
Uhha-Ziti had two recorded children, Piyama-Kurunta and Tapalazunauli, who were of fighting age as of 1322 BC.

== History ==
=== Late Bronze ===
==== War with the Hittites ====
In the dominant Hittite Empire, Suppiluliuma I died in 1323 BC and his successor Arnuwanda I also died in the following year 1322 BC. This was a time of epidemics which significantly weakened the major powers. Mursili II came to the throne in 1321 BC facing multiple rebellions.

The Hittite king Mursili II in his second campaign season, 1320 BC, attacked Attarimma, Hu[wa]rsanassa, and Suruda on Arzawa's border. Their leaders fled to Arzawa. When the king demanded their extradition, Uhha-Ziti defied him and called him a "child". He also managed to enlist Manapa-Tarhunta of the Seha River Land, but not Maskhuiluwa of Mira.

Mursili put down a Kaska rebellion, and invaded Arzawa. Uhha-Ziti at this time had made his base at Apasa. During Mursili's march, a meteorite struck Apasa and wounded Uhha-Ziti, as recorded in the Annals of Mursili II:

"The mighty Storm God, My Lord, showed his divinely righteous power and hurled a thunderbolt. All of my troops saw the thunderbolt. All the land of Arzawa saw the thunderbolt. The thunderbolt passed (us) and struck the land of Arzawa. It struck Uḫḫa-Ziti’s (capital) city Apaša. It settled in Uḫḫa-Ziti’s knees, and he became ill."

In his wounded state, Uhha-Ziti could no longer lead the charge; therefore, having allied with the King of Ahhiuwa (most probably Mycenaean Greece)—the first time the "Ahhiya" are recorded with a monarch- he ordered Piyama-Kurunta to take the field at Walma by the Astarpa river. Piyama-Kurunta lost the battle, and Uhha-Ziti and his sons fled to the nearby Ahhiuwa-controlled islands.

Uhha-Ziti died while Mursili II was besieging the men of Attarimma, Hu[wa]rsanassa, and Suruda at Puranda.

== Translations ==
- Catalan
