= Seha River Land =

Bronze Age kingdom in Anatolia

- Location of the Seha River Land
- Status: Vassal state of the Hittite Empire
- Capital: Kaymakçı Tepe (hypothesized)
- Government: Kingdom
  - c. 1300 BC: Manapa-Tarhunta
- Historical era: Bronze Age
- Today part of: Aegean Region, Turkey

The Seha River Land was a kingdom in Western Anatolia in the Late Bronze Age known from Hittite texts. Part of Arzawa, it was located north of Mira and south of Wilusa, and at one point controlled the island of Lazpa (modern Lesbos).

== History ==
=== Late Bronze Age ===
The Seha River Land was a reluctant vassal state of the Hittite Empire, and much of its known history was turbulent. The Annals of Mursili II recount how the Hittite king Mursili II consolidated power over the region around 1320 BC, crushing a revolt in which the Seha River Land participated. According to Mursili, he besieged the Seha River Land's capital and was on the verge of destroying it when he accepted a last minute mercy plea from King Manapa-Tarhunta's own mother, delivered right outside the city gates. A treaty was drawn up which confirmed Manapa-Tarhunta's status as a Hittite vassal, though he once again had to plead for mercy in the Manapa-Tarhunta letter, this time because of his failure to provide Mursili with timely military support.

Manapa-Tarhunta was eventually deposed and replaced by someone named Masturi, who may have been his son. Masturi's ascent to the throne was supported by Mursili's successor Muwatalli II, and the kingdom appears to have remained loyal to the Hittites under his rule. However, it once again revolted after Masturi was himself deposed by someone named Tarhunta-Radu, seemingly with the support of the Ahhiyawa. This revolt was crushed by the Hittite king Tudhaliya IV, after which a descendant of Manapa-Tarhunta was reinstalled on the Seha River Land's throne.

== Kings of Seha River Land ==
- Muwa-Walwi: king during the late reign of Suppiluliuma I, died during the reign of Arnuwanda II.(1322 BC)
- Manapa-Tarhunta: king during the reign of Arnuwanda II.(1322 BC)
  - Briefly deposed by Ura-Tarhunta during the reign of Arnuwanda II.(1322 BC)
- Manapa-Kurunta: king during reign of Muwatalli II, mentioned in the Alaksandu treaty (c. 1290s BC)
- Masturi during the reign of Muwatalli II He is mentioned as a witness in the Treaty of Tudhaliya IV and Kurunta of Tarhuntassa.

=== Muwa-Walwi ===
Muwa-Walwi was the king of the Seha River Land as well as Appawiya during the time of Suppiluliuma I. In CTH 211, the Hittites refer to the "descendant of Muwawalwi" indicating he formed a dynasty. However, his death led to a war of succession between his sons Manapa-Tarhunta and Ura-Tarhunta.

=== Mašturi ===
In the Treaty of Tudhaliya IV and Kurunta of Tarhuntassa, Mašturi is mentioned as a witness along with other notable rulers like Ini-Teshub of Carchemish, Alantalli of Mira, and Bentesina of Amurru

== Location ==
The Seha River itself is generally identified with the Bakırçay River or the Gediz River, but the kingdom's precise location has not been conclusively identified. The leading candidate for the site of its capital is Kaymakçı Tepe near the Gediz River, where excavations since 2014 have revealed a major Bronze Age settlement whose citadel is more than four times larger than that of contemporary Troy.

Max Gander suggested that evidence would also be compatible with the Seha River Land being located south of Ephesus, and closer to the valley of Meander River. As part of this argument, he suggests that the Manapa-Tarhunta letter need not be read as implying that Seha ruled Lesbos.

== See also ==
- Arzawa
- Hapalla
- Historicity of the Iliad
- Karabel relief
- Mira
- Luwians
