= Mira (kingdom) =

Former country

Kingdom of Mira
- 1330 BCE–late 13th Century BCE
- Location of Mira and neighbouring states
- Status: Vassal state of the Hittite Empire
- Government: Kingdom
- King of Mira
  - ca. 1330 BCE–1300 BCE: Mašḫuiluwa
  - After 1220s BCE–?: Mašḫuitta
- Historical era: Bronze Age
  - Established: 1330 BCE
  - Disestablished: late 13th Century BCE
- Today part of: Aegean Region, Turkey

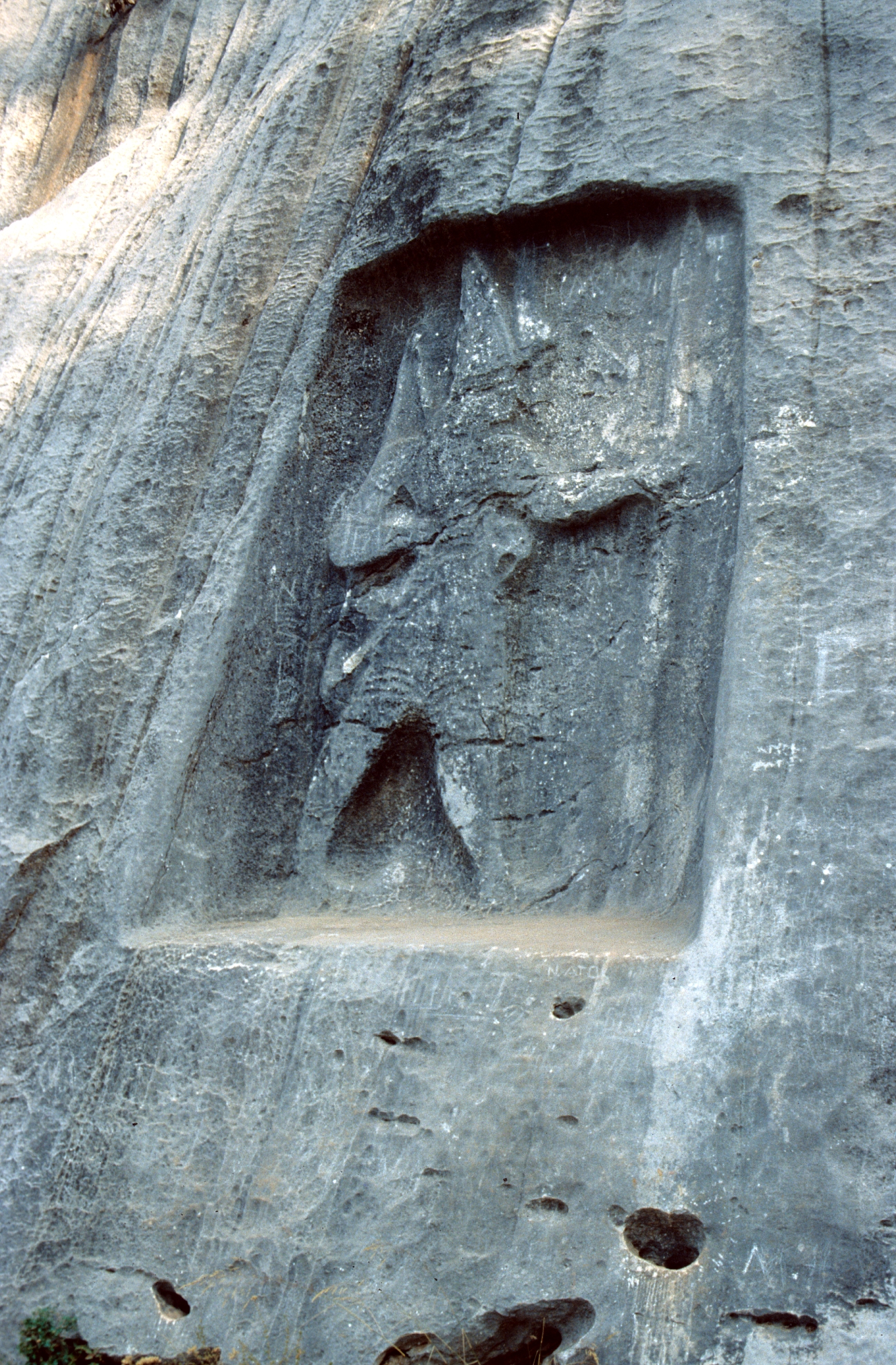
Relief of King Tarkasnawa of Mira at Karabel

Mira (ca. 1330–1190 BC), in the Late Bronze Age, was one of the semi-autonomous vassal state kingdoms that emerged in western Anatolia (Asia Minor) following the defeat and partition of the larger kingdom of Arzawa by the victorious Suppiluliuma I of the Hittite Empire. A significantly smaller Arzawa continued, centered on Apasa (Ephesus), with Mira to the east.

== Location ==
According to the current understanding, Mira's northern border with the Seha River Land was marked by the Karabel relief. This was first proposed in 1975 by Hans Gustav Güterbock and confirmed by John David Hawkins decipherment of the inscription on the relief in 1998. The southern border with the Lukka lands was probably at Milas, while the eastern border with Hapalla and the Hittite kingdom may have been somewhere around Afyon. Borders with other territories, like Pitašša, Maša, and the kingdom of Arzawa are only attested in limited time periods. Mira was the closest of the Arzawa lands to the Hittite kingdom.

== History ==
=== Late Bronze ===
The earliest reference to Mira is connected to the Arzawa campaign of the Hittite Great King Šuppiluliuma I in the 14th century BC, but it is unclear whether Mira was one of the opponents of the Great King, or what its relationship to Arzawa was. Šuppiluliuma's daughter, Muwatti was married to Mašḫuiluwa, who came from the Arzawa lands. After the successful conclusion of the Arzawa campaign by Šuppiluliuma's son and successor Muršili II, Mašḫuiluwa was installed in Mira as a vassal ruler and granted 600 men as a personal guard. How much of the area of the former Arzawa lands were encompassed by Mira is not clear. It is probable that Mira extended to the Aegean coast and had its capital at Apaša (later Ephesus). Soon after, Mašḫuiluwa was convicted of perjury, stirred up the land of Pitašša against the Hittites, and fled to the land of Maša. Muršili II threatened to invade Maša and thus Mašḫuiluwa was handed over to him, whereupon he was deported to Hattusa. By agreement with 'the Great men' of Mira, Mašḫuiluwa's successor was his nephew and adopted son, Kupanta-Runtiya.

During the reign of Ḫattušili III in the 13th century BC, there seem to have been disagreements between the Hittites and the king of Mira (probably Kupanta-Runtiya), because of the latter's support for Urḫi-Teššup, whom Ḫattušili had ousted. Whether this led to war between Mira and the Hittites is not clear. The last known reference to Mira is in the treaty of Tudḫaliya IV with his cousin or uncle Kurunta of Tarḫuntašša, late in the 13th century BC, in which a king of Mira with the name of Alantalli is named as a witness to the treaty.

== Kings ==
- Mašḫuiluwa (ca. 1330–1300 BC; Luwian: 'Mouse'); married Muwatti, the sister of Mursili II.
- Kupanataruntiya (Kupantakurunta; ca. 1300–1250/40 BC); nephew and adopted son of Mašḫuiluwa.
- Alantalli (after 1259 – after 1236 v. Chr.)
- Tarkasnawa (until some time after 1220 BC; Luwian: 'Ass'); son of Alantalli
- Mašḫuitta or Parḫuitta withness on a treaty between Great King Tudhaliya IV of Hatti and Kurunta of Tarhuntassa.
- Kupantakuruntas II (uncertain validity) at the time of Arnuwanda III. He calls himself "great king" and son of Great King Mashuittas, son of Great King Alantallis, son of Great King Kupantakuruntas. Implies, that the Hittite Empire was collapsing under Arnuwandas III and Suppiluliuma II.

== Testimonies ==
In the Suratkaya inscription, a 'Great prince' Kupantakurunta is named, who is most likely the son of Mašḫuiluwa. The reference to Mira in the inscription is an indication that the land extended at least to the eastern part of the Beşparmak Mountains.

Mira is mentioned in around twenty, mostly fragmentary, cuneiform tablets found at Boğazkale (Ḫattuša) from the 14th and 13th centuries BC. In the Karabel relief, a king of Mira named Tarkasnawa is depicted. The Hieroglyphic Luwian inscription on the relief reads:

Tarkasnawa, King [of the land of] Mira

[son of] Alantalli, King of the land of Mira

grandson of ...., King of the land Mira

The name Tarkasnawa also appears on a silver seal and in seal impressions from Hattusa, where the name was previously read as Tarkondemos.

== Bibliography ==
- Frank Starke: Mirā. In: Der Neue Pauly (DNP). Band 8, Metzler, Stuttgart 2000, ISBN 3-476-01478-9, Sp. 250–255.
