= Muršili II =

King of the Hittite Empire from c. 1320–1295 BC

Mursili II (also spelled Mursilis II) was a king of the Hittite Empire (New kingdom) c. 1330–1295 BC (middle chronology) or 1321–1295 BC (short chronology).

== Early life ==
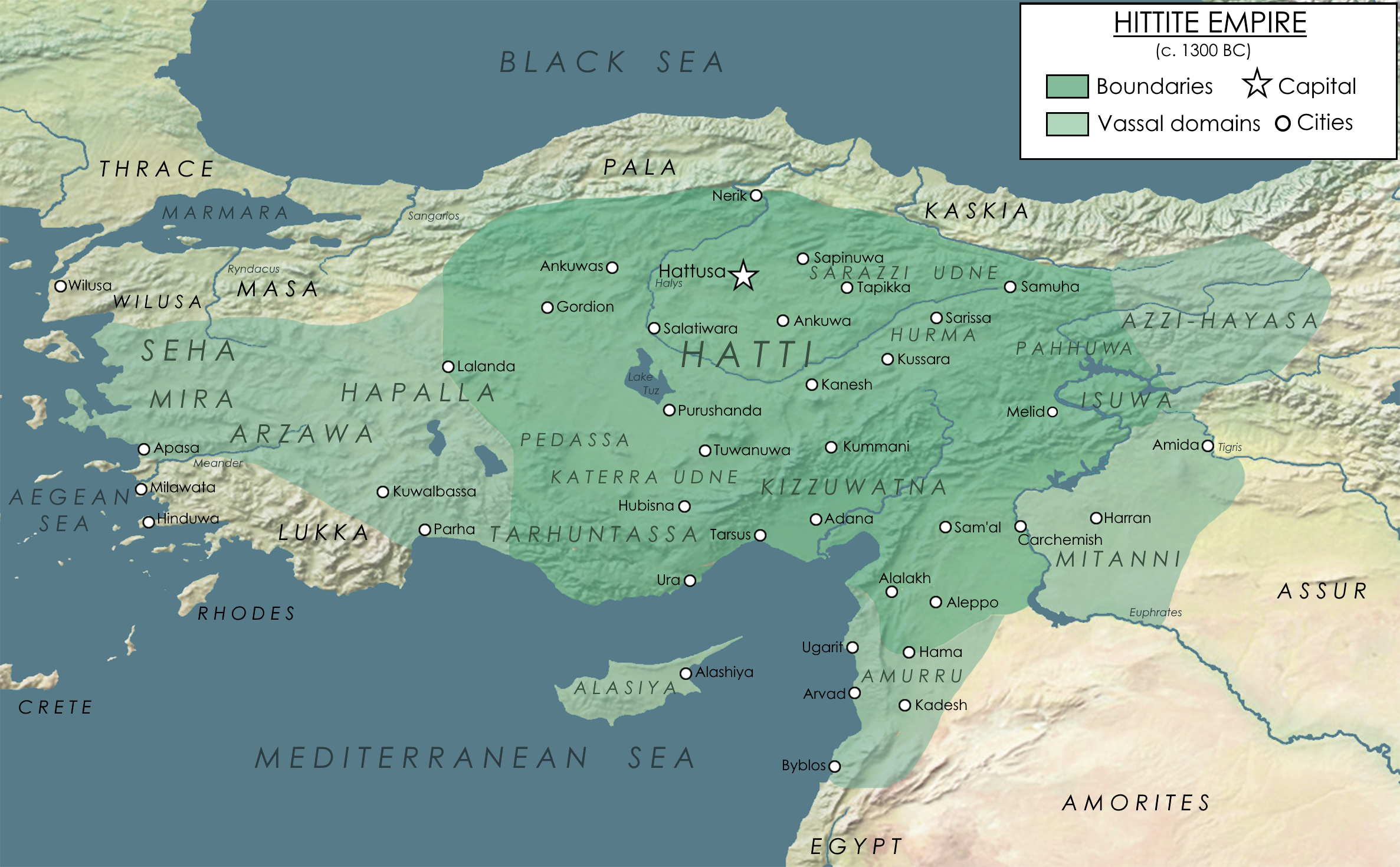
Hittite empire during the reign of Mursili.

Mursili was the fifth born son of King Suppiluliuma I, one of the most powerful men to rule over the Hittite Empire, and Queen Henti. He was the younger brother of Arnuwanda II, he also had a sister and three more brothers.

== Reign ==
In 1321 BC Mursili II assumed the Hittite throne after the premature death of Arnuwanda II who, like their father, fell victim to the plague which ravaged the Hittites in the 1330s BC. He was greeted with contempt by Hatti's enemies and faced numerous rebellions early in his reign, the most serious of which were those initiated by the Kaskas in the mountains of Anatolia, but also by the Arzawa kingdom in southwest Asia Minor and the Hayasa-Azzi confederation in the Eastern Anatolia. This was because he was perceived to be an inexperienced ruler who only became king due to the early death of Arnuwanda.

=== Ten Year Annals (CTH 61) ===
Mursili records the scorn of his foes in his Annals:

You are a child; you know nothing and instill no fear in me. Your land is now in ruins, and your infantry and chariotry are few. Against your infantry, I have many infantry; against your chariotry I have many chariotry. Your father had many infantry and chariotry. But you who are a child, how can you match him? (Comprehensive Annals, AM 18–21)

While Mursili was a young and inexperienced king, he was almost certainly not a child when he took the Hittite throne and must have reached an age to be capable of ruling in his own right. Had he been a child, other arrangements would have been made to secure the stability of the Empire; Mursili after all had two surviving elder brothers who served as the viceroys of Carchemish (i.e.: Sarri-Kush) and Aleppo respectively.

Mursili II would prove to be more than a match for his successful father, in his military deeds and diplomacy. The Annals for the first ten years of his reign have survived and record that he carried out punitive campaigns against the Kaska tribes in the first two years of his reign in order to secure his kingdom's northern borders. The king then turned to the West to resist the aggression of Uhhaziti, king of Arzawa, who was attempting to lure away Hittite allies into his camp. During his ninth year his cupbearer Nuvanza decisively defeated Hayasan forces at the Battle of Ganuvara, after which the Hayasa-Azzi would be reduced to Hittite vassals. The Annals also reveal that an "omen of the sun," or solar eclipse, occurred in his tenth year as king, just as he was about to launch his campaign against the Hayasa-Azzi.

=== The eclipse ===
Mursili's Year 10 solar eclipse is of great importance for the dating of the Hittite Empire within the chronology of the Ancient Near East. There are only two possible dates for the eclipse: 24 June 1312 BC or 13 April 1308 BC. The earlier date is accepted by Hittitologists such as Trevor R. Bryce (1998), while Paul Åström (1993) has suggested the later date. However, most scholars accept the 1312 BC event because this eclipse's effects would have been particularly dramatic with a near total eclipse over the Peloponnese region and Anatolia (where Mursili II was campaigning) around noon. In contrast, the 1308 BC astronomical event began in Arabia and then travelled eastwards in a northeasterly direction; it only reached its maximum impact over Mongolia and Central Asia. It occurred over Anatolia around 8:20 in the morning making it less noticeable.

=== Reign length ===
Mursili II's highest confirmed date was his twenty-second year. He is believed to have lived beyond this date for a few more years and died after a reign of around 25 to 27 years. He was succeeded by his son Muwatalli II.

=== Archive ===
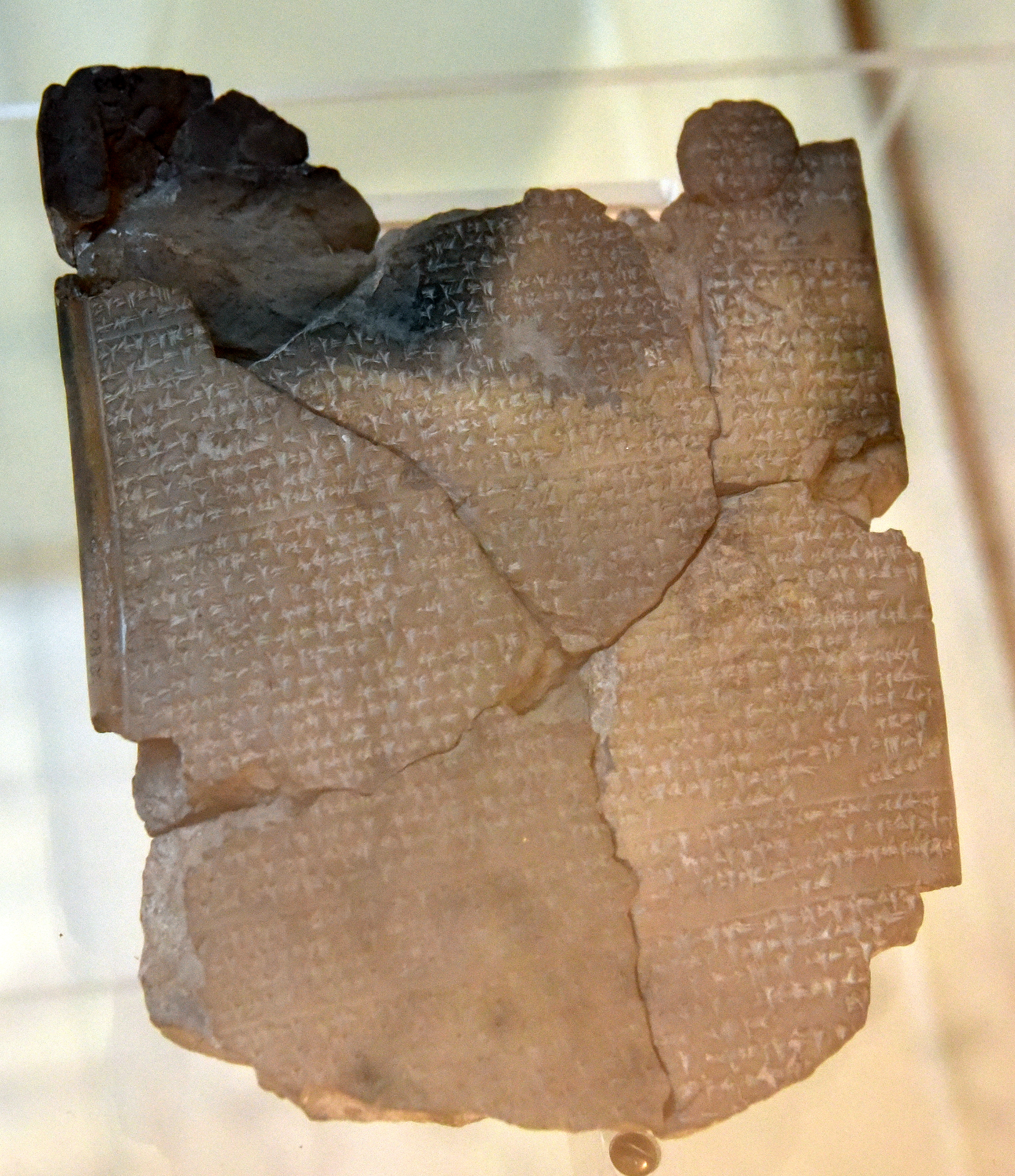
Mursili II prayers to the gods to end a plague, 14th century BC, from Hattusa, Istanbul Archaeological Museum

Mursili II is known from several cuneiform texts.

- CTH 57 Decree of Muršili II on the recognition of the status of his brother Pijaššili/Šarri-Kušuḫ in Karkamiš
- CTH 61 Annals of Muršili II (I Ten-year annals, II Detailed annals, III unassigned fragments)
- CTH 62 Treaty of Muršili II with Duppi-Teššup of Amurru (I Akkadian, II Hittite)
- CTH 63 Legal rulings on the border conflict between Nuḫašše and Barga and agreement with Duppi-Teššup of Amurru
- CTH 64 Decree of Muršili II on the demarcation of the border between Ugarit and Mukiš
- CTH 65 Decree of Muršili II on the conflict between Ugarit and Šijannu
- CTH 66 Treaty of Muršili II with Niqmepa of Ugarit
- CTH 67 Treaty of Muršili II with Targašnalli of Ḫapalla
- CTH 68 Treaty of Muršili II with Kupanta-Kurunta of Mira and Kuwalija
- CTH 69 Treaty of Muršili II with Manapa-Tarḫunta of Šēḫa
- CTH 70 Prayer of Muršili II about the misdeeds and banishment of Tawananna (widow of Šuppiluliumas I)
- CTH 72 Report of Muršilis II on conflicts with Egypt in Syria, with prayer to the assembly of gods
- CTH 84 Report on the deeds of Šuppiluliumas I and Muršilis II.
- CTH 202 Letter from Mašḫuiluwa from Mira-Kuwalija to Muršili II.
- CTH 376 Hymns and Prayers to the Sun Goddess of Arinna
- CTH 377 Hymn and prayer of Muršili II to Telipinu
- CTH 378 Plague prayers of Muršili II.
- CTH 380 Prayer to Lelwani for the recovery of Gaššulijawija
- CTH 440 Ritual for Ḫamrišḫara
- CTH 482 Reform of the cult of the goddess of the night of Šamuḫa by Muršili II.
- CTH 486 Muršili's speech paralysis
- CTH 513 not assigned (formerly “Inventory of metal objects with the name of Muršilis II.”; see CTH 526–530)

== Family Tree ==
Mursili is known to have had several children with his first wife Gassulawiya including three sons named Muwatalli, Hattusili III and Halpasulupi. A daughter named Massanauzzi (referred to as Matanaza in correspondence with the Egyptian king Ramesses II) was married to Masturi, a ruler of a vassal state. Mursili had further sons with a second wife named Tanuhepa. The names of the sons of this second wife have not been recorded however.

Through his son Muwatalli he had a grandson who also ruled the kingdom, Mursili III, Queen Maathorneferure and Tudhaliya IV were also grandchildren of Mursili II.

Hittite New Kingdom royal family tree according to Trevor Bryce

Kantuzilli (Note: Scholars have suggested that Tudhaliya I/II was possibly a grandson of the Hittite king Huzziya II; the first Tudhaliya is now known to be the son of Kantuzzili (Bryce 1997, p. 131 suggested Himuili, but the new edition, Bryce 2005, p. 122, indicated Kantuzzili).)
Tudhaliya I/II (Note: Bryce (1997) does not consider it clear whether Tudhaliya I/II was one king or two (p. 133); the link points to Tudhaliya II. Among those who identify distinct kings Tudhaliya I and Tudhaliya II, Freu (2007) has Kantuzzili—his son Tudhaliya I—his son Hattusili II—his son Tudhaliya II (p. 311).)	Nikkalmati (Note: Bryce (1997), p. 139.)
Arnuwanda I	Asmunikal
Hattusili II? (Note: The existence of Hattusili II is doubted by many scholars (Bryce 1997, pp. 153–154; Bryce 2005, p. 141). Among those who accept the existence of Hattusili II, Freu (2007), p. 311, has Tudhaliya I—his son Hattusili II—his son Tudhaliya II.)	Tudhaliya III (Note: Bryce (1997), p. 158.)	Daduhepa (Note: Bryce (1997), p. 172.)	Zida (Note: Bryce (1997), p. 174.)
Tudhaliya the Younger (Note: Bryce (1997), p. 168.)	Henti (1)	Šuppiluliuma I	(2) Tawananna (Note: Also known as Malnigal; daughter of Burnaburias II of Babylonia (Bryce 1997, p. 173).)
Arnuwanda II	Telipinu (Note: ‘Great priest’ in Kizzuwadna and king (lugal) of Aleppo (Bryce 1997, p. 174).)	Sarri-Kusuh (Note: King (lugal) of Carchemish.) (Note: Bryce (1997), pp. 174, 203–204.)	Zannanza (Note: Zannanza died on his way to Egypt to marry a pharaoh's widow, probably Ankhesenpaaten, the widow of Tutankhamun (Bryce 1997, pp. 196–198).)	Gassulawiya (Note: Bryce (1997), p. 227.) (1)	Mursili II	(2) Tanuhepa (Note: Bryce (1997), p. 230.)
Talmi-Sarruma (Note: Bryce (1997), p. 220.)	Sahurunuwa (Note: Bryce (1997), p. 222.)	Muwatalli II	Halpasulupi (Note: Haas (2006), p. 91.)	Massanauzzi (Note: Massanauzzi married Masturi, king of the Seha River Land (Bryce 1997, p. 313).)	Hattusili III (Note: Bryce (1997), p. 296.)	Puduhepa (Note: Puduhepa was the daughter of the Kizzuwadnan priest Pentipsarri (Bryce 1997, p. 273).)
Ini-Tesub (Note: Bryce (1997), pp. 346, 363.)	Urhi-Tesub	Kurunta (Note: King (lugal) of Tarhuntassa (Bryce 1997, p. 296); apparently later Great King of Hatti (Bryce 1997, p. 354).)	Nerikkaili (Note: Nerikkaili married a daughter of Bentesina, king of Amurru (Bryce 1997, p. 294).)	numerous daughters (Note: Two daughters of Hattusili III were married to the pharaoh Ramesses II; one was given the Egyptian name Ma(hor)nefrure. Another, Gassuwaliya, married into the royal house of Amurru. Kilushepa was married to a king of Isuwa. A daughter married into the royal family of Babylon. A sister of Tudhaliya IV married Sausgamuwa, king of Amurru after his father Bentesina. From Bryce (1997), pp. 294 and 312.) and sons (Note: Bryce (1997), p. 332.)	Tudhaliya IV (Note: Bryce (1997), p. 363. Tudhaliya IV probably married a Babylonian princess, known by her title of Great Princess (dumu.sal gal) (Bryce 1997, pp. 294, 331).)
Talmi-Tesub (Note: Bryce (1997), p. 363.)	Arnuwanda III (Note: Bryce (1997), p. 361.)	Suppiluliuma II (Note: Last documented Great King of the Land of Hatti.)
Kuzi-Tesub (Note: King and then Great King of Carchemish (Bryce 1997, pp. 384–385).)

- (1) = 1st spouse
- (2) = 2nd spouse
- Small caps indicates a Great King (LUGAL.GAL) of the Land of Hatti; italic small caps indicates a Great Queen or Tawananna.
- Dashed lines indicate adoption.
- Solid lines indicate marriage (if horizontal) or parentage (if vertical).

References:
- Trevor Bryce (1997). The Kingdom of the Hittites. Oxford, England: Clarendon Press.
- Trevor Bryce (2005). The Kingdom of the Hittites (new edition). Oxford, England: Clarendon Press.
- Trevor Bryce (2012). The World of the Neo-Hittite Kingdoms. Oxford, England: Oxford University Press.
- Jacques Freu (2007). Les débuts du nouvel empire hittite. Paris, France: L'Harmattan.
- Volkert Haas (2006). Die hethitische Literatur. Berlin, Germany: de Gruyter.

== In fiction ==
- Janet Morris wrote a detailed biographical novel, I, the Sun, whose subject was Suppiluliuma I. Mursili II is an important figure in this novel, in which all characters are from the historical record, which Dr. Jerry Pournelle called "a masterpiece of historical fiction" and about which O.M. Gurney, Hittite scholar and author of The Hittites, commented that "the author is familiar with every aspect of Hittite culture". Morris' book was republished by The Perseid Press in April 2013.
- Chie Shinohara wrote the manga series Red River (also known as Anatolia Story), about a fifteen-year-old Japanese girl named Yuri Suzuki, who is magically transported to Hattusa, the capital of the Hittite Empire in Anatolia. She was summoned by Queen Nakia who means to use Yuri as a human sacrifice. Yuri's blood is the key element needed in placing a curse upon the princes of the land so that they will perish, leaving Nakia's son Juda as the sole heir to the throne. As the story progresses, however, Yuri not only repeatedly manages to escape Nakia's scheming, she also becomes revered as an incarnation of the goddess Ishtar and falls in love with prince Kail. Mursili II is portrayed as Prince Kail Mursili. In the end, Yuri decides to stay in the past, and after Juda renounces his claim out of disgust towards his mother, Kail and Yuri ascend as the rulers of Hattusa.
- Mursili II is a major figure in all three books of the Amarna Trilogy by Grea Alexander. In the series, Mursili becomes obsessed with appeasing the gods and regaining their favor after his father's betrayal of the Telepenus's Proclamation and the disasters that befall the Hittites following the so-called Zannanza affair.
- Mursili II is an important presence in Gordon Doherty's novel, Empires of Bronze: Son of Ishtar (2019), whose protagonist is Mursili's third son, Hattusilis III.
- King of Kings by Bruce W. Johnson [2019] is a fictional reconstruction of the Arzawan campaign of 1319 - 1318 BCE.

== See also ==
- History of the Hittites

== Sources ==
- Åström, Paul (1993). "The Omen of the Sun in the Tenth Year of the Reign of Mursilis II". In Paul Åström (ed.). Horizons and Styles: Studies in Early Art and Archaeology in Honour of Professor Homer L. Thomas. Studies in Mediterranean Archaeology. Vol. CI. Paul Åström Förlag. ISBN 91-7081-072-9.
- Bryce, Trevor (1999). The Kingdom of the Hittites. Oxford: Oxford University Press. ISBN 978-0-19-924010-4.
- Bryce, Trevor (2004). Life and society in the Hittite world. Oxford University Press. ISBN 0-19-924170-8.

Regnal titles
Preceded by Arnuwanda II	Hittite king c. 1330–1295 BC	Succeeded by Muwatalli II
