= Slow Train to Izmir =

2002 play by Mark Angus

Slow Train to Izmir is a 2002 play written by Mark Angus. It has been performed at the Southwark Playhouse, where it was directed by Maggie Zolinsky. The play is based on a true story (Dorak affair) and focuses on the Anglo-Dutch archaeologist James Mellaart. In the late 1950s and early 1960s he was accused of, in turn, stealing an invaluable collection of Neolithic artefacts found near Dorak in Turkey and, ultimately, of fabricating their entire existence. The play deals with attempts by the Turkish press both to recover the treasure and to expose Mellaart and the western archaeology 'industry' as corrupt. The city mentioned in the title is İzmir, Turkey.

The premier at the Southwark Playhouse starred Robert Bowman, Jane Allighan, Anna-Marie Wayne and Paul Croft.
