= Beyköy Texts =

The Beyköy texts are a conglomerate of copies of Hieroglyphic Luwian inscription fragments and purported translations of cuneiform texts. With the exception of the Hieroglyphic Luwian trachyte inscription Beyköy 1, described by William M. Ramsay in 1889 – found in the area of Beyköy in western Anatolia, about 34 km north of Afyonkarahisar – the texts are regarded as modern forgeries.

The purported tracings of Hieroglyphic Luwian limestone inscriptions designated Beyköy 2–4, as well as alleged translations of cuneiform bronze tablets, come from the papers of the British-Dutch prehistorian James Mellaart, who died in 2012. From 1959 to 1961 he was deputy director of the British Institute of Archaeology at Ankara, and he later lectured at the UCL Institute of Archaeology. According to his handwritten notes, Beyköy 2 and the cuneiform texts had already been discovered at Beyköy in 1878, and the tracings and translations are said to have come into his possession only much later, by circuitous routes. The designations Beyköy 1–4 themselves go back to Eberhard Zangger and Frederik Christiaan Woudhuizen, who thereby linked them to the inscription fragment discovered by Ramsay.

Shortly after Zangger and Woudhuizen published the supposed tracings of the hieroglyphic inscriptions and the content of the cuneiform translations in 2017, Zangger, while going through Mellaart's complete papers in February of the following year, came to the conclusion that in the course of his scholarly career Mellaart had produced forgeries on a large scale in order to support his interpretations of the early history of Anatolia. Subsequently, Zangger and Woudhuizen distanced themselves from the authenticity of the alleged cuneiform translations. With regard to the Hieroglyphic Luwian inscriptions, however, they maintained that these were genuine, thereby taking an isolated position within the scholarly community. None of the Beyköy inscriptions has been included in the corpus of Luwian hieroglyphic inscriptions by John David Hawkins.

== Beyköy 1 ==
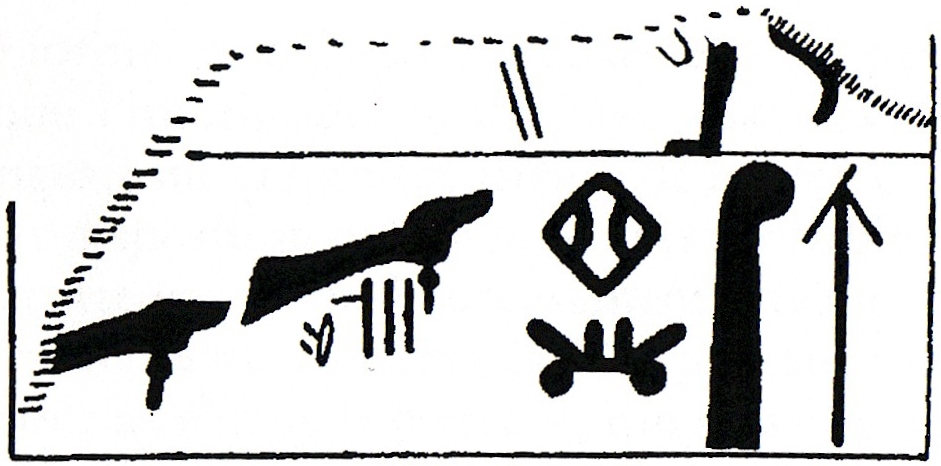
Beyköy 1 after William Ramsay.

In 1889, the Scottish ancient historian and epigraphist William M. Ramsay (1851–1939) described an inscription fragment which he had already found in 1884 on the flank of a burial mound, on a presumably trachytic stone block about one English mile south of Beyköy. He made a copy of the fragment and identified it as a hieroglyphic inscription: the signs were arranged in two broad lines separated by a narrow relief band and formed individual words in vertical sequence; the opposing orientation of a foot in the upper line and a hand in the lower line he interpreted as an indication of a writing direction alternating from line to line (boustrophedon). In 1900 the fragment was included by Leopold Messerschmidt in the Corpus Inscriptionum Hettiticarum, but it was already considered lost by 1939 and has remained untraceable ever since, despite several intensive searches.

Since Luwian hieroglyphs could not yet be deciphered in Ramsay's time, it was not until 1980 that Émilia Masson presented a first translation, based on his copies. If one follows Frederik C. Woudhuizen, the text probably refers to a successful military campaign during the late reign of the Hittite Great King Muwattalli II (1295–1272 BC). The composition is accordingly to be dated to the phase in which Urhi-Teššup, the later Muršili III, had assumed the position of tuhkanti ("designated successor to the throne") after the early death of his half-brother Kurunta – who had died at some point after the composition of the Tawagalawa letter (which Woudhuizen, contrary to the prevailing scholarly opinion, dates to around 1280 BC). Since, apart from this small fragment, practically no further material is available, no statements can be made about the historical context or the political geography of the region, especially as it may be a spolium that was only brought to the site in Phrygian times. The inscription block has not been included in Hawkins's corpus of Luwian hieroglyphic inscriptions.

== Beyköy texts from the papers of James Mellaart ==
=== Mellaart's papers ===
In June 2017, the geoarchaeologist Eberhard Zangger obtained access to previously unpublished manuscripts from the papers of the archaeologist James Mellaart, who had died in 2012, through Mellaart's son Alan. Mellaart – deputy director of the British Institute of Archaeology at Ankara from 1959 to 1961, subsequently lecturer in prehistoric archaeology at Istanbul University, and internationally known above all for his discovery of Çatal Höyük – had left in them documents on bronze and limestone inscriptions, some in Hieroglyphic Luwian and some in cuneiform, from the time of the Sea Peoples invasion, which according to his notes had been discovered at Beyköy in the late nineteenth century but had later been lost. Zangger had already become aware of the cuneiform inscriptions in 1995 through telephone conversations and correspondence with Mellaart, who had mentioned them in passing in several publications as early as the beginning of the 1990s. Only a very small portion of Mellaart's hieroglyphic and cuneiform "discoveries" had been published at the time of his death – a circumstance that clearly distinguishes these cases from Mellaart's other forgery affairs.

Since the material seemed to support Zangger's controversial thesis of powerful Luwian kingdoms in western Anatolia, he initially judged it to be enormously significant and presented the collection to a broad public with considerable media impact. In doing so, he took the view that Mellaart had deliberately withheld the material in question so as not to lend further weight to the allegations of forgery that had been raised against him since the 1960s and had intensified again since the early 1990s – allegations which Zangger in this context consistently dismissed as unfounded. These controversies included, besides the Dorak affair, in particular incidents concerning forged wall paintings from Çatal Höyük as well as Luwian seals and inscriptions. Against the background of these allegations, Zangger argued that the finds in question were of such extraordinary character and historical significance that their publication by Mellaart would inevitably have provoked new skepticism – which Zangger, of course, regarded as entirely unfounded – and a fresh wave of criticism. Zangger published a first analysis and reconstructions of the inscription that he and Woudhuizen later designated Beyköy 2 in October 2017. Shortly before publication he had learned that Mellaart had already presented the same text to colleagues in the 1990s; at that time there had been a consensus that it was yet another forgery by Mellaart. Together with Frederik C. Woudhuizen, he published in December 2017 – initially online, later also in print – a contribution that responded, among other things, to the doubts that had been voiced in the scholarly community in the wake of the announcement of the publication, and that argued vehemently for the authenticity of the inscription.

At the end of February 2018, Zangger spent five days going through the papers from James Mellaart's study. In doing so, it became clear to the geoarchaeologist that over the course of his academic career Mellaart had forged material on a considerable scale. Although Zangger had been alerted beforehand to Mellaart's numerous, widely known forgeries and had wilfully brushed these warnings aside, he nevertheless presented these discoveries, with remarkable self-assurance, as a "new breakthrough", made possible solely by his own work and the material he had found. Despite all this, Zangger and Woudhuizen – invoking, among other things, the presumption of innocence – held fast to the authenticity of the Hieroglyphic Luwian limestone inscriptions and suspected their actual origin to lie in the illegal art market. This position met with considerable irritation and sharp criticism in the scholarly community.

=== Beyköy 3 and 4 ===
The texts designated by Zangger and Woudhuizen as Beyköy 3 and Beyköy 4 are based on drawings of two Hieroglyphic Luwian fragments from Mellaart's papers, which were first published in early December 2017. These alleged copies had, however, already become known to the scholarly community in the late 1980s: in a letter dated early June 1989, Mellaart sent John David Hawkins a sheet with drawings of seven hieroglyphic inscription blocks, labelled with the letters A to G – relief blocks and rock inscriptions which, according to his statements, came from different findspots: Beyköy near Afyon (A and B), Çapan/Şahakaya between Gördes and Akhisar (C), and Dağardı at the Eğrigöz Dağ (D–G). In the letter Mellaart announced that he would present the inscriptions a month later at the 36th Rencontre Assyriologique Internationale in Ghent, which he duly did; the drawings were evidently recent and had probably been made in the same year. Zangger mistakenly identified the inscription blocks shown in Ghent with the text later designated Beyköy 2 and further assumed that the paper had been presented by Oliver Gurney in Mellaart's absence; in fact, Mellaart was present and presumably also delivered the lecture himself.

The Ghent inscriptions show a certain affinity with the Hieroglyphic Luwian seals that Mellaart claims to have found at Ortakaraviran in the 1950s and that probably constitute his earliest forgeries. The drawings exhibit numerous erroneous uses of signs; substantial parts of the inscriptions must be regarded as incorrect or entirely meaningless. Assuming their authenticity, Woudhuizen has nevertheless produced a transliteration and translation and has maintained that the inscriptions are genuine. Evidently, the forgeries were designed to place western Anatolian rulers attested elsewhere into invented contexts, in order to support an idiosyncratic interpretation of the political geography of western Anatolia.

=== Beyköy 2 ===
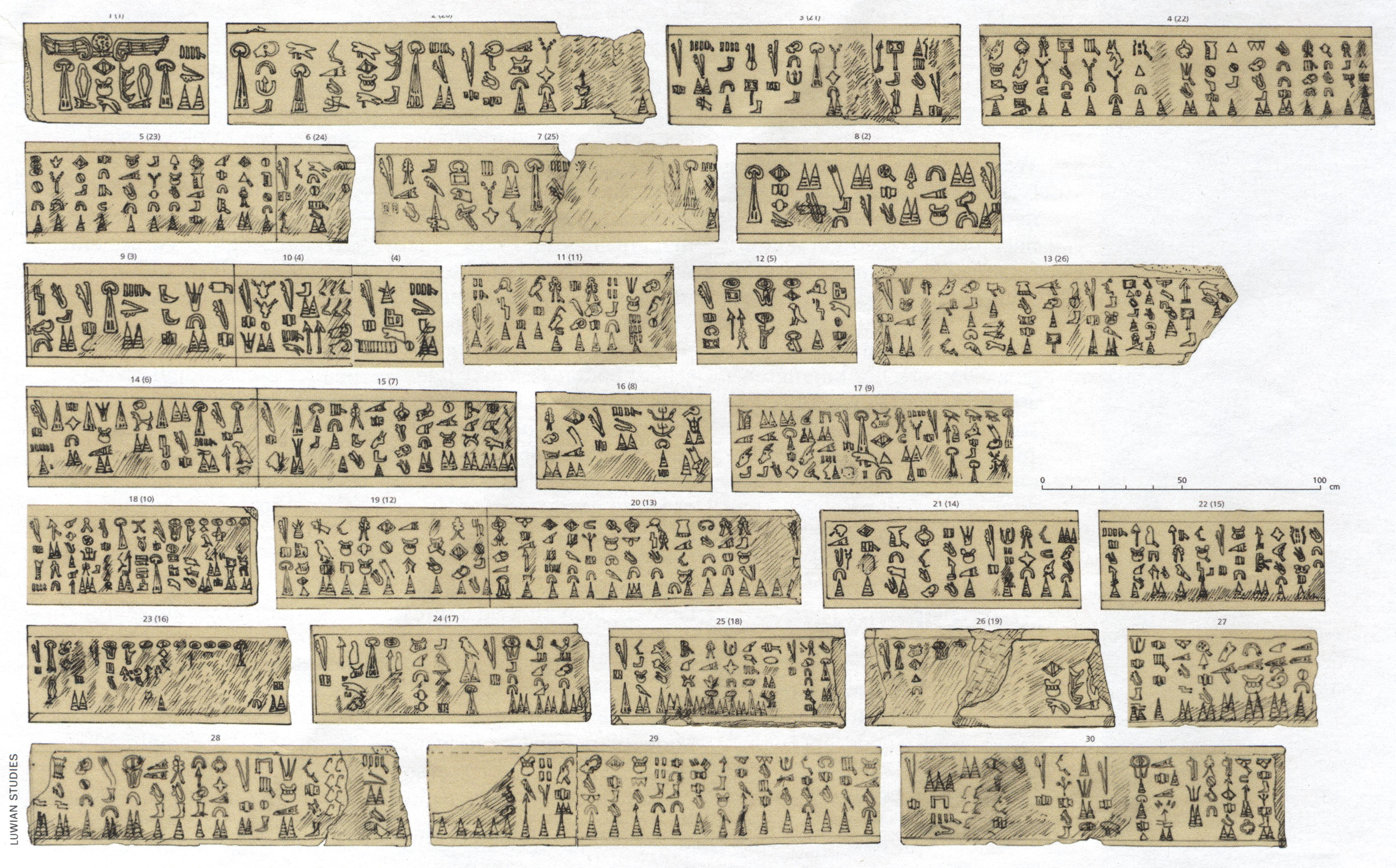
The purported tracing of the Hieroglyphic Luwian text now designated Beyköy 2, from the papers of James Mellaart, who first presented it to the scholarly community in the mid-1990s.

Like Beyköy 3 and 4, Beyköy 2 purports to be a tracing of a Hieroglyphic Luwian inscription from the late Bronze Age of western Anatolia. The frieze was first published in October 2017 by Zangger in his book Die Luwier und der Trojanische Krieg, which was to become the starting point of an intense and controversial scholarly debate. Were it authentic, it would be, by a wide margin, the longest known Bronze Age Hieroglyphic Luwian inscription. In terms of content, Beyköy 2 presents itself as the inscription of an otherwise unknown Great King Kupanta-Kurunta of Mira, a contemporary of Muksus, with a genealogy traced back to his great-grandfather and namesake, who had been installed by the Hittite Great King Muršili II in the late 14th century BC. Thematically, the text deals with events in the context of the Sea Peoples invasions around 1190 BC and offers extensive enumerations of places, lands, and the deities worshipped there.

Mellaart first made the frieze known to the scholarly community in the mid-1990s, some time after the presentation of the Ghent inscriptions (including Beyköy 3 and 4); it was regarded as yet another forgery. Its origin is probably to be seen in connection with the edition of the Yalburt inscription in 1993, which may have inspired Mellaart's deception. According to Mellaart's highly adventurous account, preserved in handwriting in his papers, the French archaeologist and epigrapher Georges Perrot had already copied the text in 1878 from some thirty limestone blocks that smallholders at Beyköy had recovered while looking for building material; the frieze is said to have been about 35 cm high and about 29 m long overall. After Perrot's return to Constantinople, the Ottoman authorities supposedly ordered the blocks to be secured, but when the director of the antiquities administration arrived at the findspot, the stones had already been built into the foundation of a newly erected mosque; a search of the village is then said to have brought to light a series of cuneiform bronze tablets (see below). In the 1950s, a Turkish-American research project for the publication of inscriptions confiscated in the nineteenth century is said to have been founded under the direction of the head of the Antiquities Authority in Ankara, Hamit Zübeyir Koşay (d. 1984). The translation of the cuneiform tablets is supposed to have been completed as early as the 1960s, whereas the drawings of the hieroglyphic inscription made by Georges Perrot are said to have been rediscovered only in the 1970s. A publication of the limestone inscriptions had reportedly been envisaged only for the second volume of the publication series. Besides the translators Albrecht Götze (d. 1971) and Edmund Irwin Gordon (d. 1984), the curator of the British Museum Richard David Barnett (d. 1986) and the archaeologists Bahadır Alkım (d. 1981) and his wife Handam Alkım (d. 1985) are said to have been involved in this project; Mellaart himself is supposed to have been taken into the undertaking only in 1976, through the Alkım couple. The early death of Bahadır Alkım is then said to have delayed the publication, and although the translations of the cuneiform tablets were allegedly already in print in 1984, the rapid passing of all the key participants in the project ultimately led to the volume never appearing. In Mellaart's papers, however, no traces of any correspondence with Gordon or Alkım could be found.

Recent philological studies have shown that the text consists essentially of gibberish and bears no resemblance to authentic Hieroglyphic Luwian inscriptions of any period: the signs are arranged arbitrarily, logograms are rendered incorrectly or in mirror image, the sign sequences are linguistically meaningless, and in addition there are freely invented sign forms. In producing the forgery, Mellaart evidently relied on older literature, above all Emmanuel Laroche's Les Hiéroglyphes Hittites of 1960, without taking later advances in decipherment into account. The content consists predominantly of imaginatively constructed place names, some of which still appear formally plausible, while the majority are spontaneous, unattested inventions. Moreover, the text mixes sign forms of different periods, so that late variants from the 10th century BC end up in a context supposedly dating to the early 12th century. Scholarship today regards Beyköy 2 as one of several Hieroglyphic Luwian forgeries by Mellaart, produced from the 1950s onward, evidently as part of an attempt to prove the archaeologically undemonstrable existence of powerful Luwian kingdoms in western Anatolia.

On the assumption that the frieze is authentic and that Mellaart was not able to read Hieroglyphic Luwian, Woudhuizen has produced a transliteration and an "improved translation" of the text.

=== Cuneiform Beyköy texts ===
According to the notes in Mellaart's papers, the cuneiform Beyköy texts are said to have been inscribed on one, two, three, or twenty-five large bronze tablets, which were supposedly confiscated in 1878 by the director of the Ottoman antiquities administration after a search of the village of Beyköy. The occasion for this search is said to have been the failed attempt to secure the roughly thirty stone blocks of the Hieroglyphic Luwian limestone inscription mentioned above, which, according to Mellaart's account, the villagers had walled into the foundation of a mosque shortly after the discovery (see above).

After the confiscation, the tablets are said to have been transferred to the newly founded Archaeological Museum in Constantinople, where one of them was briefly shown in an exhibition in the 1880s. After one tablet disappeared, however, the remaining pieces were taken to the residence of Sultan Abdülhamid II, the Dolmabahçe Palace. During the political unrest of 1918 the remaining tablets were repeatedly reported as misplaced, stolen, or lost, but later reappeared. In the 1920s one of the tablets is then said to have been shown to Emil Forrer, since at that time no Turkish scholar was yet able to read the cuneiform text. From the inscription Forrer is said to have concluded that, contrary to previous assumption, the kings of Arzawa/Mira had been responsible for the fall of the Hittite empire, whereupon Kemal Atatürk personally forbade the publication of the text, since its content contradicted the official Hittite state ideology of the young Turkish republic. This story at the same time affords certain insights into Mellaart's view of history: with regard to the various peoples of ancient Anatolia he adopted a decidedly "political" position – he was anti-Mycenaean, anti-Hittite, and pro-Luwian in outlook. He rejected the concept of a great Mycenaean empire advocated by Forrer, as well as the importance of the Hittites, which in his view was overrated, and located the real power in second-millennium BC Asia Minor in the kingdom of Arzawa. In his account the Hittites appear as aggressive nationalists and oppressors of foreign peoples, whereas the Luwians appear almost as ancient freedom fighters who bravely resisted the tempestuous forces of their age. At the end of the 1930s, the missing tablet is finally said to have been rediscovered and two German Hittitologists commissioned to translate the tablets; since then, however, the ensemble is said to have remained in storage.

In the 1950s, the German-American scholar of the ancient Near East Albrecht Götze is said to have received the commission for the translation within the framework of the aforementioned Turkish-American research project; Mellaart claims to have received in part, between 1976 and 1981, a 67-page English translation with 278 numbered paragraphs separated by horizontal lines. After the death in 1981 of Bahadır Alkım, who had been designated for the publication, the first volume containing the cuneiform Beyköy texts is said to have gone to press in 1984 but never appeared; from 1986 onward Mellaart claims to have been the only person who still had parts of the material at his disposal and worked with it.

In several publications of 1992/93, as well as in correspondence with colleagues, Mellaart announced its imminent publication, which, however, failed to materialize before his death in 2012. It can be assumed that the purported translation of the tablets was produced around 1992. In 1995 he was in contact with Zangger by letter and telephone about the content of the cuneiform tablets. In May 2017, Zangger and Woudhuizen presented the content of the inscription in question, together with arguments for the authenticity of the underlying tablets, for the first time at an international conference in Izmir – at that point based solely on summaries that Mellaart had sent to Zangger in two letters in the 1990s; already in the following month, however, Zangger was able to present a condensed version of the 67-page "translation", to which he had meanwhile gained access through Mellaart's son. After the systematic review of the papers in the following year, in the course of which Zangger recognized Mellaart's forgery activity, both he and Woudhuizen distanced themselves from the authenticity of the cuneiform tablets, but continued to maintain the authenticity of the purported tracings of Hieroglyphic Luwian fragments. A publication of the "cuneiform translations", which are held in the library of Zangger's Luwian Studies Foundation, is not planned.

In terms of content, the document presents itself as a comprehensive historiography of western Asia Minor, reaching back vaguely to about 3170 BC and becoming increasingly concrete from 2500 BC onward. It purports to have been written down around 1170 BC on the occasion of the accession of King Muksus – after his victories over Hatti and Egypt – once again on the commission of a Kupanta-Kurunta, Great King of Mira, in Akkadian cuneiform but in the Hittite language, and to have been successively supplemented by later rulers of Arzawa until the first regnal year of King Midas in 720 BC. The text is thus evidently an attempt to push the beginnings of European historiography back into the Bronze Age and to construct a self-contained history of Anatolian antiquity up to the onset of Greek historiography.

== Bibliography ==
- Émilia Masson: Les inscriptions louvites hiéroglyphiques de Köylütolu et Beyköy. In: Kadmos 19/2 (1980), pp. 106–122 (digitized).
- Eberhard Zangger: Die Luwier und der Trojanische Krieg, Zürich 2017.
- Eberhard Zangger and Frederik C. Woudhuizen: Rediscovered Luwian Hieroglyphic Inscriptions from Western Asia Minor. In: Talanta 50 (2018/19), pp. 9–56 (PDF).
- Michael Bányai: Der Beyköy Text: Eine Fälschung? In: Talanta 50 (2018/19), pp. 57–82 (PDF).
- Vladimir Stissi: What is Drawn and Written is not Necessarily True. Contextualising Mellaart's Fakes. In: Talanta 50 (2018/19), pp. 87–124 (PDF).
- Frederik C. Woudhuizen and Eberhard Zangger: Arguments for the Authenticity of the Luwian Hieroglyphic Texts from the Mellaart Files. In: Talanta 50 (2018/19), pp. 183–212 (PDF).
- Frederik C. Woudhuizen: Luwian Hieroglyphic Texts in Late Bronze Age Scribal Tradition, Wiesbaden 2021.
- John David Hawkins: The Fantasies of James Mellaart. Fabrications of an Anatolian Archaeologist. In: The IOS Annual 24 (2024), pp. 103–127.
- Diether Schürr: Ein pathologischer Betrüger – James Mellaart. In: Gephyra 30 (2025), pp. 195–216 (PDF).
