= Eberhard Zangger =

German geoarchaeologist and communications consultant

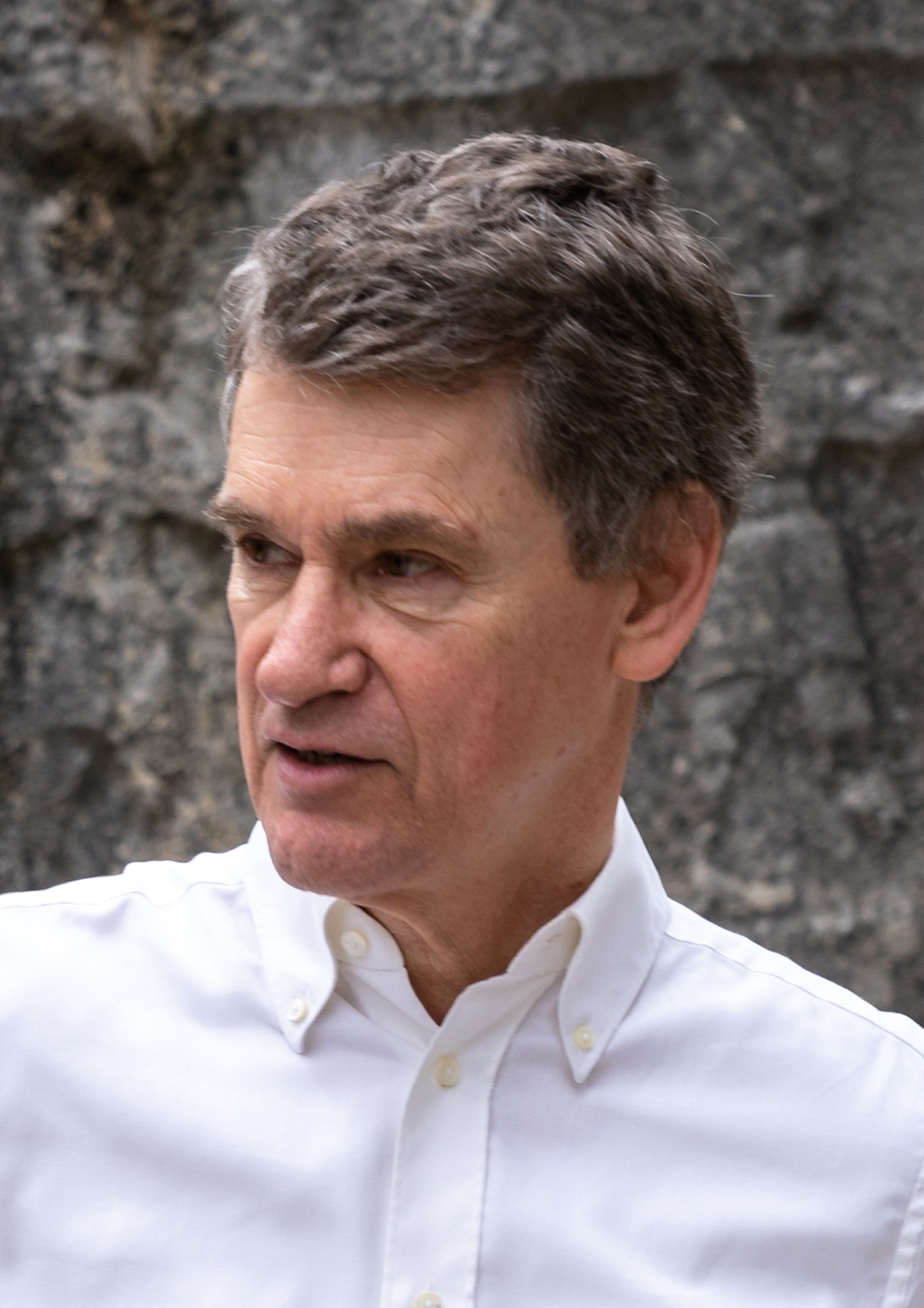
Eberhard Zangger in the Hittite rock sanctuary of Yazılıkaya, 2018.

Eberhard Zangger (born 9 April 1958, in Kamen, North Rhine-Westphalia, as Eberhard Finke) is a German geoarchaeologist, public relations consultant, and author who is best known for speculative theories about the Bronze Age history of the eastern Mediterranean that have frequently been regarded in the scholarly community as methodologically problematic. He initially attracted considerable attention with his claim that Plato's Atlantis narrative was based on the history of Bronze Age Troy and preserved memories handed down over centuries. This interpretation met with widespread and emphatic rejection among scholars of antiquity and was at times classified within the sphere of parascience. His far-reaching speculations concerning the historical significance of the speakers of Luwian languages in the second millennium BCE have proved scarcely less controversial.

Following a scholarly dispute with Manfred Korfmann, the archaeologist who had excavated Troy—a dispute that Zangger had brought into the public eye and that ultimately became the subject of a court case—Zangger largely withdrew from academia in the late 1990s and turned to management consulting. After Korfmann's death, he returned from the private sector to research in the 2010s and soon found himself once again at the centre of heated scholarly controversy. Zangger is the founder and president of the Luwian Studies Foundation, established in 2014, which is dedicated to the study of the Bronze Age cultures of Western Anatolia.

== Biography ==
=== Early life and academic education ===
Eberhard Zangger was born in April 1958 under the name Eberhard Finke, the son of Günter and Gerda Finke, into a family of craftsmen. After completing his secondary education, he began a two-year apprenticeship as a technical assistant at the Senckenberg Natural History Museum in Frankfurt am Main in 1974. This was followed by another two-year apprenticeship as a geological preparator at what was then the first and only German preparator school in Bochum, which he completed in 1978. Finke then worked for a year and a half at the German Mining Museum in Bochum, where he was involved in projects dealing with the effects of air pollution on art and cultural monuments. Parallel to his professional activities, Finke passed the examination for admission to university studies without a high school diploma. Following that he began studying geology and paleontology at Christian Albrecht University in Kiel. For his achievements, he received several scholarships from the German National Academic Foundation, including a domestic, overseas, and doctoral scholarship.

In 1984, Finke continued his studies at Stanford University. There, he earned his doctorate in 1988 with a dissertation on the topic of Landscape Evolution of the Argive Plain (Greece). Paleoecology, Holocene Depositional History, and Coastal Change. In the same year, he married and took his wife's surname. The couple had two children and separated in 1999. From 1988 to 1991, Zangger was a research assistant at the Department of Earth Sciences at the University of Cambridge. During this time, he focused on geoarchaeological issues and investigated, among other things, the coastal location of Dimini Magoula in Neolithic Greece, the expansion of Lake Lernai, and the function of Mycenaean river diversions. This research attracted considerable attention in professional circles. In 1991, Zangger founded the independent geoarchaeological consulting firm Geoarchaeology International in Zurich and was involved in several archaeological field projects in the Mediterranean region through this company.

=== The Atlantis-Troy hypothesis ===
In the summer of 1991, Zangger visited the excavation site at Hisarlık for the first time at the invitation of Manfred Korfmann. Due to his expertise in the field of artificial water engineering structures, Korfmann hoped for further inspiration. Since the geomorphological analysis of the canals in Troy was already the responsibility of geoarchaeologist Ilhan Kayan, Zangger's participation in the excavations was unofficial and merely "as a tourist." Even before the trip, while still in Tübingen, Korfmann had strongly advised Zangger in a personal conversation not to pursue his hypothesis about Troy and Atlantis, which he had been developing since April 1990. Zangger did not heed his advice.

In 1992, Zangger finally attracted greater attention with his work The Flood from Heaven – Deciphering the Atlantis Legend, in which he publicly formulated the thesis that Plato's Atlantis narrative was based on the history of Troy. He argued that Plato had used an ancient Egyptian version of the story of Troy for his account of Atlantis, drawing parallels between Mycenaean culture and Plato's description of Atlantis, as well as between the Trojan War and the war between Greece and Atlantis. This thesis initially met with cautious interest, particularly in the Anglo-Saxon world, however, it soon met with fierce criticism and was largely rejected by archaeologists as untenable due to methodological shortcomings, with some even likening it to pseudoscience.

=== Academic conflict with Manfred Korfmann and Transition to the private sector ===
Since 1994, Zangger has been developing a chronology of political and economic events and processes in the eastern Mediterranean region in the 13th century BC. In doing so, he interpreted the Homeric Trojan War as a reminder of a significant conflict that led to the collapse of several states in the region around 1200 BC. He attached particular importance to the so-called Luwian kingdoms in western Anatolia – including Arzawa, Mira, Wilusa, Lukka, and Seha – and emphasized their role in the course of these historical events.

In 1998, Zangger planned an airborne geophysical survey of the Troia plain to identify settlement layers and supposed artificial harbors. However, the Turkish Ministry of Culture and Tourism refused to grant permission for this project—a decision that was in line with the scientific concerns of Manfred Korfmann, who was critical of Zangger's theories and interpretations. The conflict with the Tübingen archaeologist, which had been smoldering for some time, escalated completely in the early 2000s when Korfmann questioned Zangger's scientific reputation and stated that he could not be found in scientific publications. Korfmann also compared Zangger on another occasion to representatives of the parasciences because of his questionable interpretations. These statements, claiming that Zangger could not be found in specialist publications, led to legal proceedings in which Zangger sued Korfmann. In August 2000, the Press Chamber of the Munich I Regional Court ruled in favor of Zangger and prohibited Korfmann from denying Zangger's scientific competence.

At the time of this escalation, Zangger had already withdrawn from research due to increasing criticism of his theories and a lack of acceptance within the scientific community. He had moved into the private sector and was working as a consultant for strategic corporate communications for a Zurich-based PR agency. In 2001, he moved to KPNQwest Switzerland, where he worked as Director of Corporate Communication until 2002. In 2002, Zangger founded a content agency in Zurich that focused on science communication and has been operating under the name science communications GmbH since 2007. In 2017 he published a book about the pioneers of this discipline in Anatolia. In this highly autobiographical work, Die Luwier und der Trojanische Krieg. Eine Entdeckungsgeschichte (The Luwians and the Trojan War: A Story of Discovery), Zangger described his perspective on the events surrounding the Trojan investigation he initiated, as well as the controversies with Korfmann, whom he accused of sabotaging his research. Some of his statements about Korfmann, who died in 2005, were perceived by reviewers as clearly crossing the line.

=== Return to research and the debate on the estate of James Mellaart and the Beyköy-texts ===
More than a decade after retiring from research, Zangger founded the international non-profit foundation Luwian Studies in April 2014, becoming its president. The foundation is dedicated to researching Luwian culture and its significance in the Bronze Age Aegean, with the aim of expanding knowledge about this little-studied civilization.

In addition to his research on Troy and what he calls Luwian culture and its role in the Late Bronze Age, Zangger has also published in other fields, particularly geoarchaeology, with a focus on the reconstruction of prehistoric coastlines and historical hydraulic engineering projects. He also studied the role of the Sea Peoples in the collapse of Bronze Age cultures and archaeoastronomy, specifically the lunisolar calendar function of Hittite rock sanctuaries.

Zangger also devoted extensive attention to the estate of archaeologist James Mellaart, which in turn sparked an academic controversy. In June 2017, he gained access to numerous manuscripts belonging to Mellaart through his son Alan Mellaart. These documents concerned supposed Bronze and limestone inscriptions—some written in cuneiform, others in Luwian hieroglyphs—that were said to have been discovered in the 19th century near the village of Beyköy, but subsequently lost. Zangger considered the significance of these texts to be enormous, since they appeared to confirm his long-held hypothesis regarding the existence of powerful Luwian kingdoms in Anatolia. In his estimation, Mellaart had refrained from publishing the inscription during his lifetime because this would inevitably have reinforced the allegations of forgery that had been made against him since the Dorak affair in the 1960s.

A preliminary analysis of the material, as well as of drawings that Mellaart had allegedly made based on the work of Georges Perrot and which Zangger referred to as the "Beyköy 2" source, was included by Zangger in his book Die Luwier und der Trojanische Krieg. Eine Entdeckungsgeschichte, published in October 2017. In this context, Zangger dismissed the notion that the texts might be forgeries as "absurd" and interpreted various inconsistencies as evidence supporting the authenticity of the inscription. Together with Frederik C. Woudhuizen, Zangger published an article in December 2017—first online and then in print the following year—in which the two authors reaffirmed the authenticity of the Beyköy 2 inscription. This publication came in response to doubts about the genuineness of the discoveries that had been raised within the scholarly community earlier that same autumn. It was pointed out that the inscription had already been presented and discussed at an international conference in Ghent in 1989. At that time, there was broad consensus among experts that it was a modern forgery. Zangger had not been aware of this when he published the text.

In February 2018, Zangger, together with James Mellaart's son, spent five days searching the archaeologist's former study for additional documents related to the Beyköy texts. During this process, he concluded that Mellaart had fabricated extensive amounts of material over the course of his academic career. Zangger and Woudhuizen subsequently distanced themselves only from the English "cuneiform translations." They maintained, however, that the hieroglyphic inscriptions were authentic; they suspect that their actual origin lies in the illegal art market. More recently, John David Hawkins has pointed out that the authenticity of Beyköy 2 and the other inscriptions must be considered impossible, as the content of the hieroglyphic texts is essentially gibberish.

From 2020 to 2024, Zangger studied at Harvard University, where he earned a Master of Liberal Arts (ALM) in Extension Studies, Field of Anthropology and Archaeology. His master's thesis was titled From Memes to Marx. Social Media as the New Frontier of Ruling Class Dominance.

== List of publications ==
Monographs

- Zannger, Eberhard (1988): Landscape Evolution of the Argive Plain, Greece. Paleoecology, Holocene Depositional History and Coastline Change [PhD thesis], Stanford University.
- ⸺ (1992):The Flood from Heaven. Deciphering the Atlantis Legend, London.
- ⸺ (1993): Geoarchaeology of the Argolid, Berlin.
- ⸺ (1994): Ein neuer Kampf um Troia. Archäologie in der Krise, Munich.
- ⸺ (1998): Die Zukunft der Vergangenheit. Archäologie im 21. Jahrhundert, Munich.
- ⸺ (2016): The Luwian Civilization. The Missing Link in the Aegean Bronze Age, Istanbul.
- ⸺ (2017): Die Luwier und der Trojanische Krieg. Eine Entdeckungsgeschichte, Zurich.
- Zangger, Eberhard, & Woudhuizen, Frederik C. (2021): Early Mediterranean Scripts, Istanbul.

Edited collections

- Zangger, Eberhard, Hajnal, Ivo, & Kelder, Jorrit M. (2022): The Political Geography of Western Anatolia in the Late Bronze Age. Proceedings of the EAA Conference Bern, 7 September 2019, Budapest.

Essays

- Zangger, Eberhard, & van Andel, Tjeerd H.: Land Use and Soil Erosion in Prehistoric and Historical Greece. Journal of Field Archaeology 17 (4), pp. 379–96.
- Zangger, Eberhard (1991): Prehistoric Coastal Environments in Greece. The Vanished Landscapes of Dimini Bay and Lake Lerna. Journal of Field Archaeology 18 (1), pp. 1–15.
- ⸺ (1992): Prehistoric and Historic Soils in Greece. Assessing the Natural Resources for Agriculture. In Berit Wells (ed.): Agriculture in ancient Greeceproceedings of the seventh international symposium at the Swedish Institute at Athens, 16–17 May 1990 (pp. 13–19) Stockholm.
- ⸺ (1993): Plato's Atlantis Account: A distorted Recollection of the Trojan War. Oxford Journal of Archaeology 18 (1), pp. 77–87.
- ⸺ (1994): The Island of Asine. A Paleogeographic Reconstruction. Opuscula Atheniensa 20 (15), pp. 221–39.
- Zangger, Eberhard et al. (1997): The Pylos Regional Archaeological Project. Landscape Evolution and Site Preservation. Hesperia 66 (4), pp. 549–641.
- Zangger, Eberhard et al. (1998): Searching for the Ports of Troy. In Philippe Leveau u. a. (ed.): Environmental Reconstruction in Mediterranean Landscape (pp. 89‒103), Oxford.
- Zangger, Eberhard, & Woudhuizen, Frederik C. (2018): Rediscovering Luwian Hieroglyphic Inscriptions from Western Asia Minor. Talanta 50, pp. 9–56.
- Zangger, Eberhard, & Gautschy, Rita (2019): Celestial Aspects of Hittite Religion. An Investigation of the Rock Sanctuary Yazılıkaya. Journal of Skyscape Archaeology 5 (1), pp. 5–38, doi:10.1558/jsa.37641.
- Zangger, Eberhard et al. (2021). Celestial Aspects of Hittite Religion, Part 2: Cosmic Symbolism at Yazılıkaya. Journal of Skyscape Archaeology 7 (1), pp. 57–94, doi:10.1558/jsa.17829.
- Zangger, Eberhard, Aşınmaz, Alper, & Mutlu, Serdal (2022): Middle and Late Bronze Age Western Asia Minor. A Status Report. In Ivo Hajnal et al. (ed.): The Political Geography of Western Anatolia in the Late Bronze Age (pp. 39–180), Budapest.
