= Beycesultan =

Archaeological site in Denizli Province, Turkey

Coordinates: 38°15′00″N 29°42′00″E

- Interactive map of Beycesultan
- Type: Archaeological site
- Periods: Late Chalcolithic to the Byzantine period
- Location: Denizli Province, Turkey
- Nearest city: Çivril

Site notes
- Area: 4 hectares (9.9 acres)

Beycesultan (pronounced [ˈbejdʒe sulˈtan]) is an archaeological site in western Anatolia (Asia Minor), located about 5 km (3.1 mi) southwest of the modern-day city of Çivril in the Denizli Province of Turkey. It lies in a bend of an old tributary of Büyük Menderes River (Maeander River).

== History ==
The site (4 ha) has some 40 archaeological layers date from Late Chalcolithic to the Byzantine period.

=== Late Chalcolithic ===
Beycesultan was occupied beginning in the Late Chalcolithic period. This large mound is almost 1 km (0.62 mi) in diameter and 25 m (82 ft) high. The first 20 layers belong to the 5th and 4th millennium BC.

Architecture saw rectangular rooms with mudbrick walls on stone foundations, with benches along the walls.

=== Early Bronze ===
The settlement increased in size and prominence through the 3rd millennium, with notable religious and civil buildings. In later part of the Early Bronze, the Anatolian Trade Network with trade between Central Anatolia and Western Anatolia, moving into the Aegean islands developed.

In Early Bronze I there were well-protected Megaron-like structures with porticoes in the front and a fireplace in the main hall. Pottery include beak-spouted jugs and jars. Small temples are built next to the large constructions with offerings and sacred horns.

In Early Bronze III, the potter's wheel arrived this region associated with the arrival of the Luwian people. Architecture was characterized by Megaron-shaped houses.

=== Middle Bronze ===
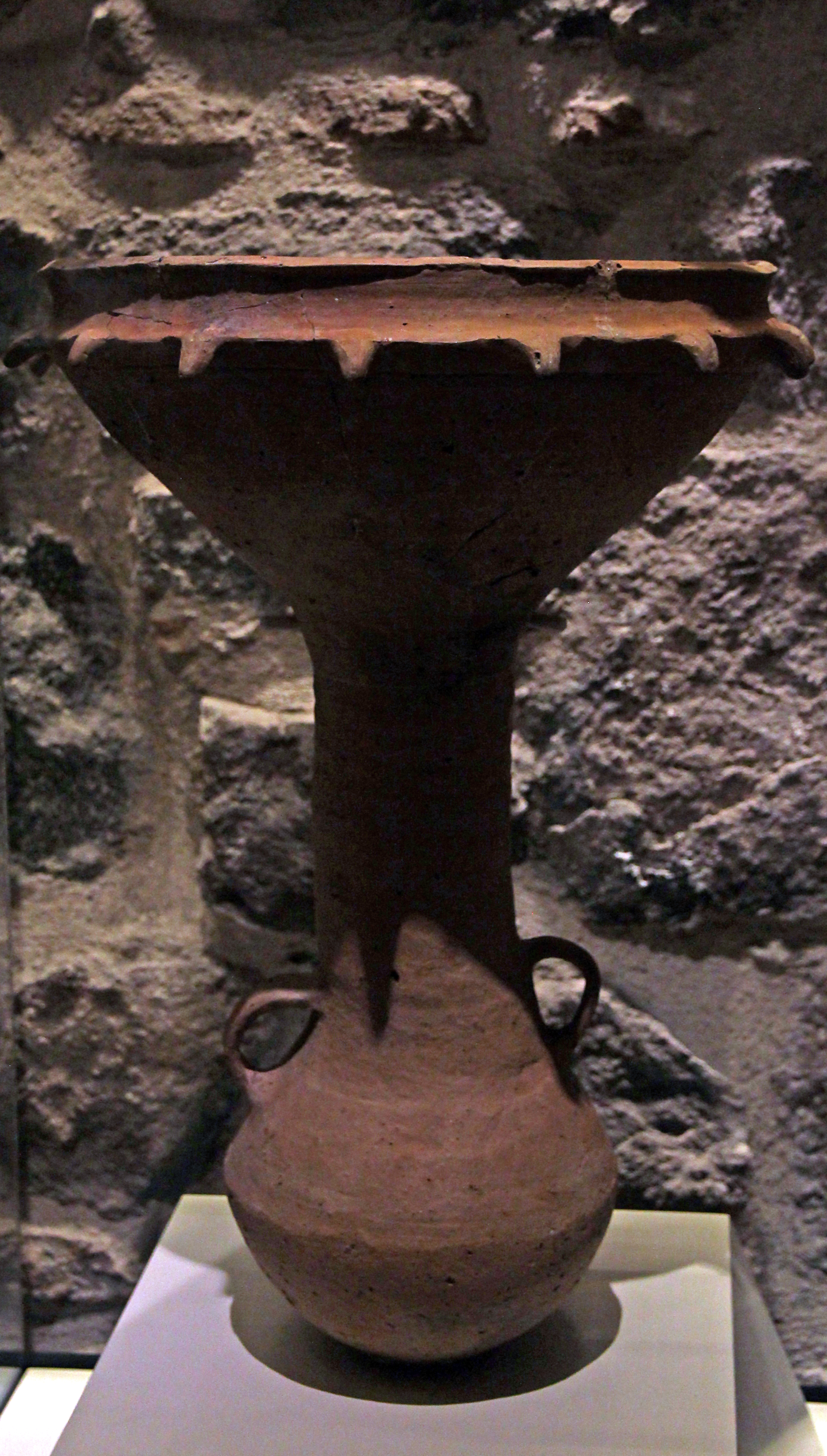
A ceramic goblet drum (darbuka) from Beycesultan. 17th to 16th century BC. Museum of Anatolian Civilizations, Ankara

Development peaked early in the 2nd millennium with the construction of a massive palace and associated structures. The palace was abandoned and then destroyed c. 1700 BC. Unlike the Early Bronze, Central Anatolia focused more on trade eastward in the Assyrian Trade Network. Western Anatolia (Asia Minor) saw the orientation of sites like Beycesultan more strongly influenced from the west, mainly the Aegean and Crete.

In the Transitional EB/MB (Level VI/V), a stamp seal had Luwian hieroglyphics represented the earliest known evidence of the Indo-European language.

In the Middle Bronze I (c. 2000-1800 BCE), Beycesultan was one of the main cities of Asia Minor. In Layer V, a palace was built on the east side of the tell. In addition, there was a lower town.

In the Middle Bronze II (c. 1800-1550 BCE), the palace has similarities with the palace of Knossos (Crete, Minoans). It was eventually burnt down in the 17th century BC. Mallaart assigned the destruction to king Hattusili I (c. 1650-1620 BCE) of the Old Hittite Kingdom fighting the Lands of Arzawa in the west. The site was semi-abandoned.

=== Late Bronze ===
The Hittite Empire (red) at the height of its power c. 1290 BC, also showing the Egyptian Empire (green)

After a few centuries of semi-abandonment, Beycesultan began to rise again, this time more influenced by the Hittite regions of Anatolia. Though smaller than the earlier city, the site was of impressive size. After the Anatolian Wars of Suppiluliuma I (c. 1350 BC), the Hittite Empire was the dominant power to the east in this region. After a second flowering of Beycesultan, it was completely destroyed c. 1200 BC as were many locations in Anatolia at that time.

=== Later Periods ===
The site was also the occupied, to a lesser scale, in the Byzantine, Seljuk and Ottoman period. It has been hypothesized that it is the Byzantine town and bishopry "Ilouza" (Ιλούζα), and possibly the Hittite Wilusa. However, Fred Woudhuizen, maintains that the name of the site can be positively identified as Mira based on epigraphic testimony.

== Archaeology ==
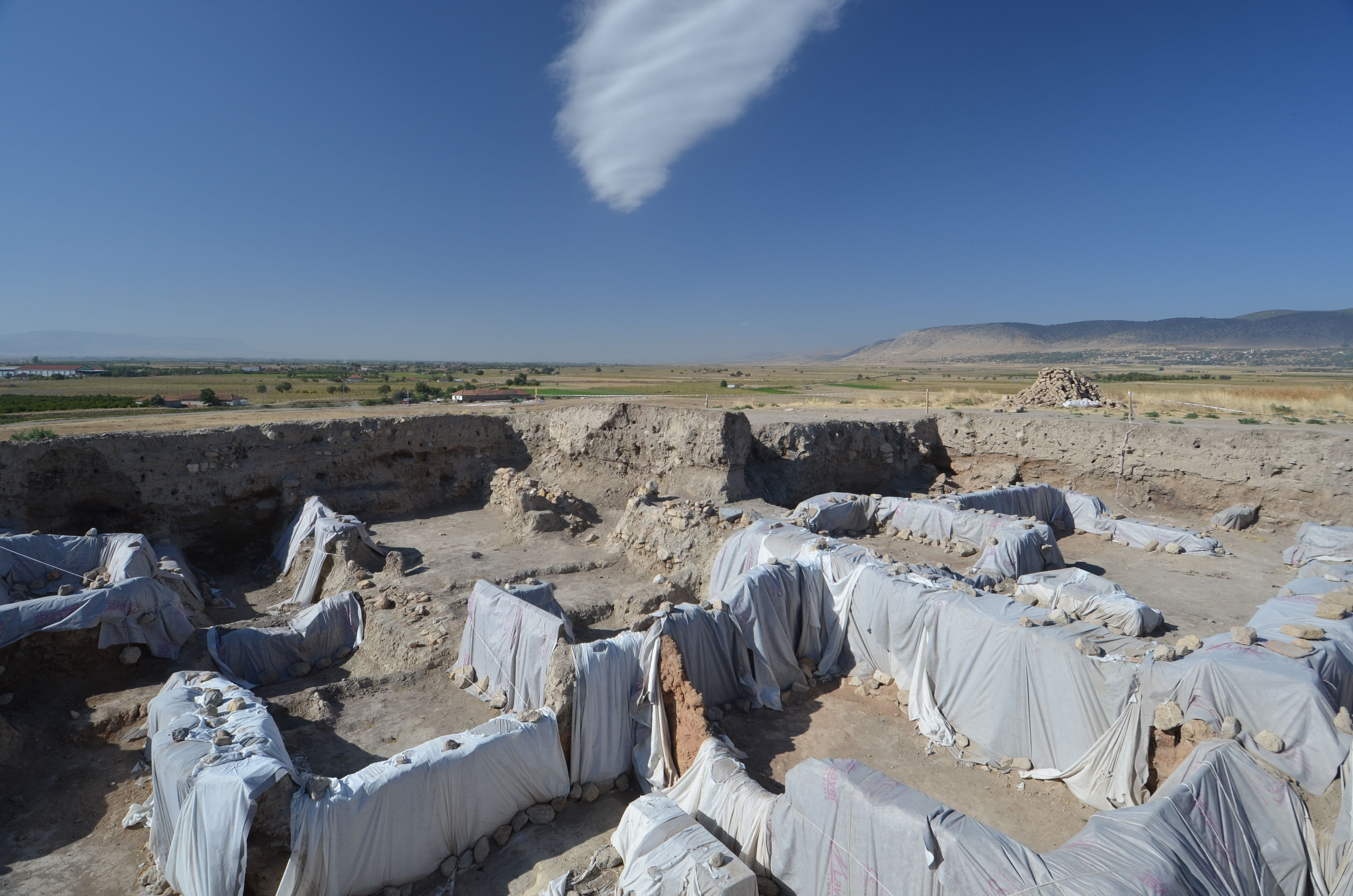
Beycesultan excavations

The site of Beycesultan consists of two mounds, divided by the old trading road. The maximum height of 25 meters is at the western mound and the entire site is around a kilometer in diameter, covering an area of about 35 hectares.

In early 1950s James Mellaart discovered specimens of "champagne-glass" style pottery in a Late Bronze Age context near the site. A search identified the höyük (mound) of Beycesultan upstream of the Menderes river.

Seton Lloyd, along with James Mellaart, excavated Beycesultan on behalf of the British Institute of Archaeology at Ankara for six seasons from 1954 to 1959 with each dig lasting around two months.

A renewed survey of the site and its region was conducted from 2002 to 2007 by Eşref Abay of the Ege University and new excavations at the site conducted under his direction beginning in 2007. Work continues to the present in conjunction with Adnan Menderes University.

While no epigraphic material has been found as yet, a few seals have been recovered.

The early excavators reported "a row of small houses that had been destroyed by fire", with the champagne-glass pottery. There was also a palace "whose plan suggested ... Knossos", which was cleared out before its destruction:

At one entrance of the palace was a kind of bathroom, where visitors washed themselves before making their bows at court. One odd feature of the inner chambers: floors raised about a yard above the ground. Beneath the floors were small passages. They suggest air ducts of a heating system, but nothing of the sort is known to have existed until 1,000 years later.

Outside the palace,

Most interesting was a row of little shops. One was a Bronze Age pub with sunken vats for the wine supply and a lavish supply of glasses for serving the customers. It also had knucklebones, a gambling game that did the duty of a modern bar's chuck-a-luck.

== See also ==
- Cities of the ancient Near East
