= Demirci Hüyük =

Excavated Bronze Age settlement in northwestern Anatolia

Coordinates: 39.850288°N 30.270673°E

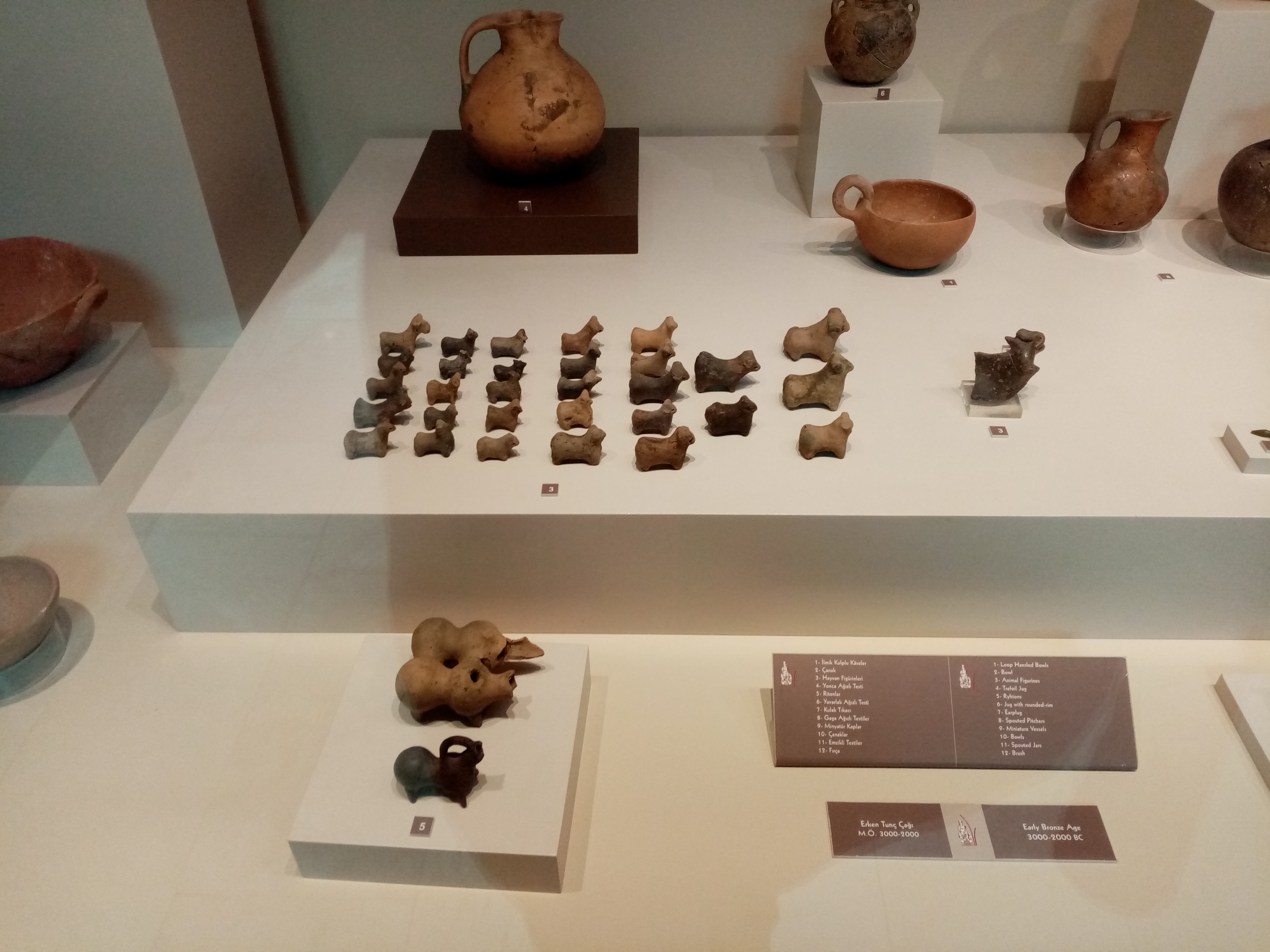
Early Bronze Age archaeological findings from Demircihöyük (3000 - 2000 BC)

Demirci Hüyük is an excavated settlement in ancient northwestern Anatolia dating from the Early and Middle Bronze Age. It is located near the village of Zemzemiye, Söğüt, about 25 km west of Eskisehir on the border of the Bilecik and Eskisehir Provinces.

The western side of the hill has been eroded by the Zemzemiye Creek passing by. The plain on which Demirci lies was filled up with sediment since the Neolithic period, so the village of Demirci's first inhabitants was excavated about 7–8 m below the plain level. The cultural deposit is about 12 m thick.

Sariket, an ancient burial ground, is on the terrace 250 m west of Demircihöyük settlement. It was used as a necropolis both during EBA and MBA. During the Hellenistic Period there were also a few inhabitants living on the top of the Demirci hill.

== Excavations ==
The settlement was excavated in 1937 by K. Bittel for the German Archaeological Institute, and then by M. Korfmann in 1975-78. The cemetery of Sariket was excavated under J. Seheer in 1990-91. Altogether 17 archaeological layers were discovered, the lowest layer being layer A.

The mound was abandoned after the Early Bronze Age settlement, and then re-occupied during the Middle Bronze Age after a few centuries' gap. The excavator suggested that some 130 people resided in the village.

== Finds ==
About 200 clay idols were found, among them plenty of animal figurines, such as the bull figurines. Weaving and spinning tools were also found. Flint and obsidian tools and flakes were also discovered, as well as the evidence of metalworking in the form of a stone casting mould.

"It is noted that the black rimmed bowls and loop handled vessels of the orange colored burnished group of ware in the style of Northwestern Anatolia appear from EBA I in this region and then from the beginning of EBA II expand to a wider area till Ankara over Iznik and Inegöl plains. T. Efe [Dr. Turan Efe] bases the long-lasting of some ware on the presence of many city states during EBA in this region."

== Chronology ==
The EBA I and II occupation at the site spanned the range of about 500 years between 3.000 and 2.500 BC. Then followed the Transitional period of about 500 years at Demirci, as well as in various other places in western Anatolia.

Küllüoba is a related site in the western part of the Upper Sakarya Plain, 35 km south-east of Eskişehir. It was settled much later, compared to Demirci.

Thanks to the recent excavations led by Dr. Turan Efe in Küllüoba and Demircihüyük, an uninterrupted EBA chronological sequence of the Eskişehir region has been established. Turan Efe started his recent excavations in 1996 and they continue for many years.

The Transitional period in western Anatolia into the Middle Bronze Age was marked by important cultural changes. The pottery of this Transitional period is accepted as the predecessor of early Hittite pottery, such as Hüseyindede vases that appeared later on. The earliest examples of this pottery seem to have occurred in the Eskişehir region, as the stratigraphy of Küllüoba attests.

The Demircihüyük Culture spread quite widely, and it covered the geographical area of what later came to be known as the territory of Phrygia. Its most important centre may have been the big settlement mound of Doryleion-Sharhöyük, about 20 kilometres east of Eskishehir, the modern centre of the region.

== Luwian connections ==
Linguist Craig Melchert suggested that the Luwians were related to Demirci Hüyük culture, implying entry into Anatolia from ancient Thrace circa 3000 BC. Competing theories are that the Luwians were related to Kura–Araxes culture (located in present day Armenia and Georgia), or descended from migrating Lulubi from the Zagros Mountains.

== See also ==
- Limantepe
- Troy

== Bibliography ==
- Pinar Durgun, Social organization in the early bronze age Demircihöyük: A re-evaluation, Koç University 2012 - academia.edu
- Michele Massa, Early Bronze Age burial customs on the central Anatolian plateau: a view from Demircihöyük-Sarıket, in: Anatolian Studies / Volume 64 / January 2014, pp. 73 – 93
- Jürgen Seeher, ILIPINAR, BARCIN HÖYÜK AND DEMIRCIHÜYÜK Some Remarks on the Late Chalcolithic Period in North-western Anatolia, ANATOLICA XXXVIII, 2012
- Turan Efe, “Early Bronze Age III Pottery from Bahçehisar: The Significance of the Pre-Hittite Sequence in the Eskişehir Plain, Northwestern Anatolia.” American Journal of Archaeology, vol. 98, no. 1, Archaeological Institute of America, 1994, pp. 5–34, https://doi.org/10.2307/506219
- Firth, Richard. 2012. The textile tools of Demircihüyük. In KOSMOS: Jewellery, adornment and textiles in the Aegean Bronze Age, Marie-Louise Nosch & Robert Laffineur (eds.), 131–138. Peeters: Liège, Belgium.
- JURGEN SEEHER. Die Bronzezeitliche Nekropole von Demircihuyuk-Sariket: Ausgrabungen des Deutschen Archaologischen Instituts in Zusammenarbeit mit dem Museum Bursa 1990-1991 (Istanbuler Forschungen 44). ix+331 pages, 90 figures, 23 tables, 28 plates, 7 plans. 2000. Tubingen: Ernst Wasmuth; 3-8030-1765-3 (ISSN 0723-4333) hardback DM198.
- Korfmann, Manfred. 1983. Demircihüyük: Die Ergebnisse der Ausgrabungen 1975-1978. P. von Zabern.
