= Dorak affair =

1960s Turkish antiquities scandal

The Dorak Affair was an archaeological controversy surrounding the British Institute of Archaeology at Ankara (BIAA) and the British-Dutch archaeologist James Mellaart (1925–2012), who served as Deputy Director of the BIAA from 1959 to 1961 and is best known for his excavations at Çatalhöyük from 1961 onward. The affair originated with Mellaart's claim in late 1958 that he had been shown an exceptionally valuable assemblage of Bronze Age grave goods in a private house in Izmir. According to his account, the objects had come from a royal tomb near Dorak in northwestern Anatolia and were in the possession of a Greek family. Mellaart stated that the finds had been recovered at the beginning of the twentieth century, during the Greco-Turkish War.

Drawings of the objects he claimed to have seen were published in the Illustrated London News in 1959. Attempts to verify Mellaart's account, however, proved increasingly problematic: neither the person he had named nor the finds themselves could be located, and the address he had provided likewise proved impossible to trace. Moreover, over the years Mellaart repeatedly altered his account of the events, in some instances substantially.

In 1962, the Turkish press accused Mellaart of involvement in the smuggling of valuable antiquities. As a consequence, he was barred from participating in the excavations at Çatalhöyük. The affair severely damaged both his scholarly reputation and his professional career. Mellaart later maintained that he had unknowingly been used by criminals who had exploited his specialist expertise to assess illegally excavated artefacts. From the late 1980s onward, however, Mellaart began presenting numerous further forgeries and fabrications to the academic world. By the 1990s, the view had increasingly gained acceptance among scholars that the Dorak treasure and the artefacts he had described had never existed at all, but had instead been fabricated by Mellaart himself.

== Mellart's story and the publication of the Dorak article ==
In November 1958, Mellaart informed his colleague David Stronach (1931–2020) and his superior Seton Lloyd (1902–1996) that he had been shown an extraordinary gold treasure in Izmir. He claimed that the objects were in the possession of a young Greek woman. From the outset, however, the accounts he gave to Stronach and Lloyd differed in significant respects, and Mellaart subsequently altered important details of the story several times.

According to the version he gave Stronach, Mellaart had noticed a gold bracelet of Troy II date on a fellow passenger during a train journey to Izmir in 1951. She allegedly identified herself as a Greek woman named Anna Papastrati and eventually invited him to her home, where she showed him a collection of ancient objects that had long been in her family's possession. Two of her uncles, she claimed, had recovered the artefacts from a grave near Dorak between 1919 and 1922, during the Greco-Turkish War.

Mellaart stated that he spent several days in the house examining the finds. Although he was supposedly forbidden to photograph them, he was permitted to make drawings. Stronach quickly noticed substantial inconsistencies in the story. Mellaart's account to Lloyd was broadly similar, but he explained the absence of photographs differently, saying that he had entered the house without a camera. He also showed Lloyd sketches and several notes in Modern Greek that allegedly accompanied the objects.

When Lloyd later asked to see the original drawings, Mellaart claimed that he had discarded them. They nevertheless reappeared among his papers after his death.

In a July 1966 conversation with journalists Kenneth Pearson and Patricia Connor, Mellaart modified the account again. He now dated the train journey to the early summer of 1958 rather than 1951. He maintained that photography had been prohibited and added that he had also been prevented from bringing a third person equipped with a camera. The young woman allegedly promised to send photographs later. Mellaart said that he had spent three or four nights in the house without leaving and that an older man, and possibly an older woman, had also been present. He described Papastrati as about 20 or 21 years old, fluent in English with an American accent, and apparently frightened. She allegedly showed him photographs of skeletons connected with the discovery and helped translate the accompanying scientific notes from Modern Greek into English. Mellaart gave the address as 217 Dirkik Street. In another version, he claimed that the woman had not initially been wearing gold jewellery but that they had begun talking about archaeology during the train journey, when she revealed that she possessed ancient objects.

Mellaart later produced a letter allegedly sent to the BIAA in October 1958 and signed by Anna Papastrati. It supposedly authorised him to publish the drawings he had made in her house. The letter gave her address as Kazim Direk Caddesi no. 2i7 Karşiyaka - Izmir.

In 1959, Lloyd took Mellaart's drawings to London, where specialists considered the material authentic and supported publication. Since no photographs existed, Lloyd rejected a conventional scholarly publication and instead arranged a richly illustrated four-page article for the Illustrated London News, published in November 1959. The illustrations were produced by Lloyd's wife. The alleged inventory was exceptionally rich: it included bronze and precious-metal weapons, gold and silver vessels, jewellery, five female statuettes, textile remains, two wooden tables and a dismantled, gilded throne. There was also an iron blade and four battle-axes made of nephrite, lapis lazuli, obsidian and amber. The throne's gold sheets allegedly carried an otherwise unattested title of the pharaoh Sahure, dating to the middle of the third millennium BCE. Because the finds could never be independently verified, the scholarly response remained limited, and the episode ultimately had serious consequences for Mellaart's reputation and career.

== Media escalation ==
In May 1962, the Turkish newspaper Milliyet, then the country's second-largest daily with a circulation of approximately 200,000, launched a three-day campaign against Mellaart. A leading article accused him of having removed artworks worth an estimated one billion Turkish lira from Turkey. Alleged witnesses claimed to have seen a corpulent foreigner accompanied by a woman near archaeological sites close to Dorak; one supposedly identified Mellaart. The controversy prompted Kenneth Pearson, an editor at the Sunday Times, and the archaeologist and BBC journalist Patricia Connor to investigate. Their subsequent publication treated Mellaart largely sympathetically and omitted many potentially critical questions.

Their investigation revealed that the address Mellaart had given belonged to a commercial district without residential buildings. It is likely that the local Turkish authorities had concluded at an early stage that the story was fabricated. None of the objects he described ever appeared in collections or on the international art market.

The affair nevertheless had significant professional consequences. As a result of the accusations made by the media, the Turkish authorities denied Mellaart permission to excavate at Çatalhöyük in 1964. In 1965, he was allowed to enter Turkey only on the condition that he participate as an excavation assistant. The BIAA itself became increasingly involved. An inquiry commissioned by the institute in 1968 concluded that Mellaart's account was truthful, that his drawings were based on authentic artefacts, and that he had never been involved in illegal activities.

== Interpretations and possible motives ==
The background of the affair has long remained a matter of controversy, with interpretations ranging from the possibility that Mellaart fabricated the entire story—object included—as a joke or prank, to the suggestion that he invented the account in order to conceal the true owners of the illicitly excavated antiquities. In response to allegations in the Turkish press that he had been involved in smuggling, Pearson, Connor, and later Mellaart himself maintained that he had instead been manipulated by criminals who staged a romantic encounter in order to obtain his expert assessment of illegally excavated artefacts. No systematic investigation of the affair was undertaken during Mellaart's lifetime.

Shortly after the drawings were published, it was pointed out that hardly all of the artifacts could be considered authentic. The numerous forgeries and fabricated materials attributed to Mellaart from the 1980s onward further strengthened the view that the Dorak objects were products of his imagination. Stronach rejected the notion of a mere practical joke and instead connected the fabrication with Mellaart‘s disappointment over the unproductive 1958 excavation season, for which Lloyd had held him responsible, as well as with Lloyd's doubts about the wider significance of Anatolian early cultures. According to Stronach, Mellaart invented the treasure to demonstrate the importance of a powerful and hitherto overlooked West Anatolian Bronze Age kingdom contemporary with Troy and thereby redirect the BIAA‘s research priorities. The elaborate account of the train journey, the young Greek woman, and the alleged romantic encounter thus served primarily to provide the purported discoveries with a superficially credible provenance.

== Bibliography ==
- Kenneth Pearson and Patricia Connor, The Dorak Affair (London, 1967)
- Vladimir Stissi, "What is Drawn and Written is not Necessarily True. Contextualising Mellaart's Fakes," Talanta 50 (2018/19): 87–123.
- Eberhard Zangger, "James Mellaart's Fantasies," Talanta 50 (2018/19): 125–82.
- David Stronach, "One of Archaeology's Greatest Mysteries – Dorak. A New Look at the Long-Lived Dorak Puzzle," in James Mellaart. The Journey to Çatalhöyük, ed. Emma L. Baysal (Istanbul, 2020): 437–43.
- Enrico Giannichedda, Il tesoro di Dorak, Archeo inchiesta (Bari, 2023).
- Diether Schürr, "Ein pathologischer Betrüger – James Mellaart," Gephyra 30 (2025): 195–216.
