= Dorylaeum =

Ancient city in Anatolia, modern Turkey

- Location within Turkey Location within Near East
- 39°47′0″N 30°31′0″E
- Location: Dorylaeum, Eskişehir, Turkey

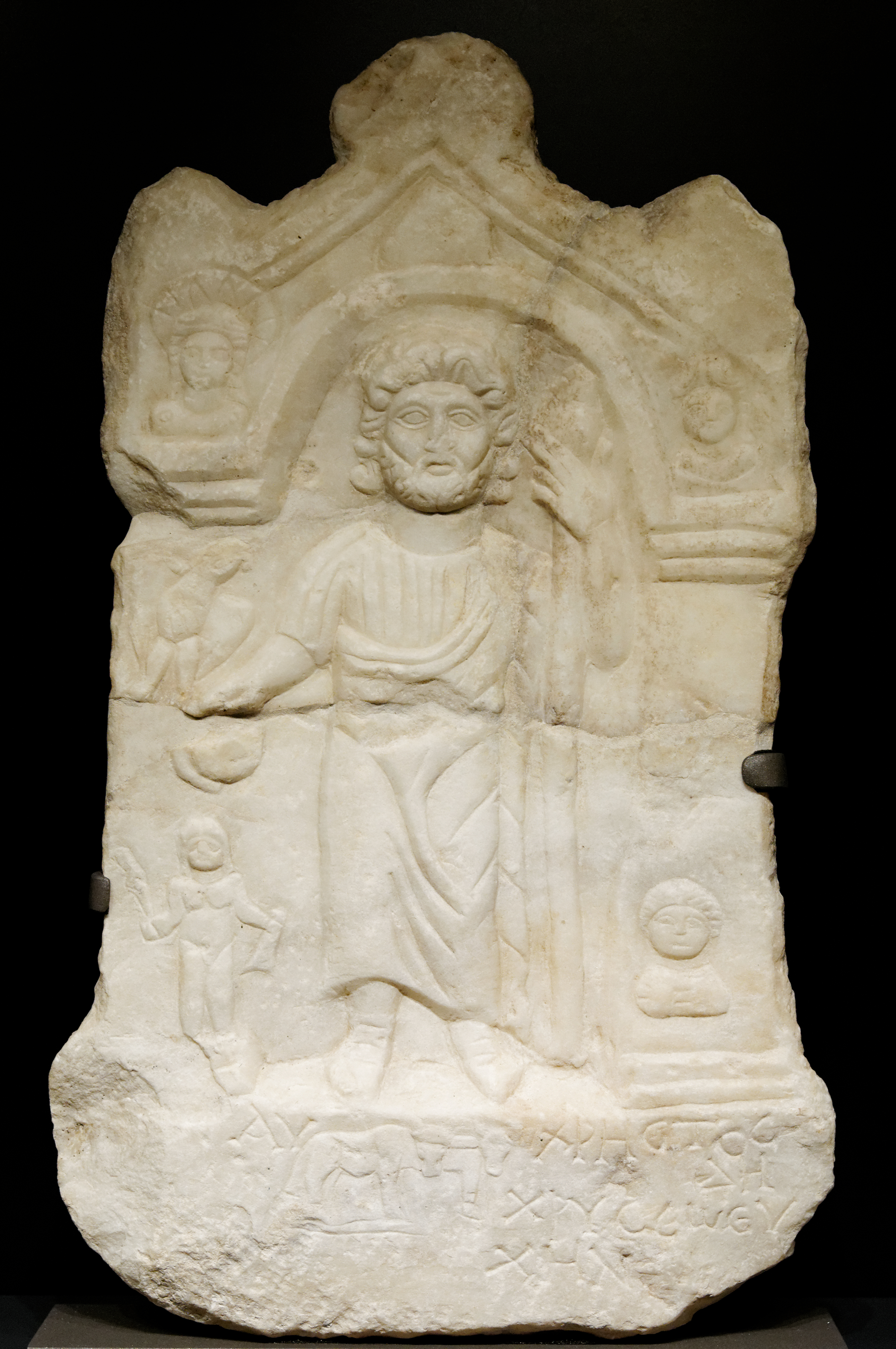
Stele dedicated to Zeus Chryseos, 3rd century AD, Dorylaeum

Dorylaion or Doryleion (Greek: Δορύλαιον; Latin: Dorylaeum) was an ancient city in Anatolia, now an archaeological site located in the Şarhöyük village near the city of Eskişehir, Turkey. It was located at the Şar Höyük mound on a hillock.

Its original location was about 10 km southwest of Eskişehir, at a place now known as Karaca Hisar; about the end of the fourth century B.C. it was moved to a location north of modern Eskişehir.

== History ==
Dorylaion (Latin: Dorylaeum) was a Phrygian, Greek, Roman and Byzantine settlement. In the Roman period it was a trading post. In the Byzantine period it had a considerable population according to archaeological findings.

=== Roman era ===
It also was probably a key city of the route the Apostle Paul took on his Second missionary voyage in 50 AD. It became a bishopric when part of the Late Roman province of Phrygia Salutaris, and produced bishops like Eusebius, who opposed the teachings of Nestorius and Eutyches.

In the third century AD, it was threatened by Gothic raids. The Roman army that was based in Asia minor was spread thin, and the navy had moved west from the Northern city of Sinope, therefore the provincials were left exposed. These Goths came from the trans-danubian region on the black sea. When the city was under threat, the people used dedicatory statues to build their wall quicker, indicating their rush to protect themselves against the invaders.

A funerary inscription from the third century AD discovered in Dorylaion provides evidence of a Jewish presence, featuring Hebrew names alongside a menorah.

=== Middle Ages ===
In the 11th century, Dorylaion produced rich harvests of grain and the rivers close to the city were a great source for fish. The villages around the city were densely populated and Dorylaion itself was embellished with stoas, fountains, and houses of illustrious citizens. Following the Battle of Manzikert in 1071 and the collapse of Byzantine Anatolia, the city was taken by the Seljuk Turks. In July 1097, during the First Crusade, Dorylaion was the site of a battle. In 1147, the environs of Dorylaion was inhabited by nomads and their large sheep flocks. Dorylaion was the site of a major German Crusader defeat in 1147, during the Second Crusade, that resulted in a retreat. In 1175, Turks were encamped at Dorylaion from where they tended their flocks in the plains. Byzantine emperor Manuel I Komnenos pushed out the Turks from the area, and in 1175 refortified Dorylaion and Soublaion to reclaim the Phrygian highlands for agriculture. A poem of the refortification, possibly by John Tzetzes who accompanied Manuel. Although agreed on that Dorylaion was to be destroyed following the Battle of Myriokephalon (17 September 1176) with Kilij Arslan II, Manuel kept it, which prompted Arslan to dispatch a large army that ravaged the rich Meander valley to the south. Muslim author al-Harawi (died 1215) described it as a place of medicinal hot springs on the frontier at the end of Christian territory.

== Archaeology ==
Şarhöyük VII has been excavated since 1989. It has revealed a series of archaeological cultural deposits, the earliest dated to the 3rd millennium BC. The city flourished during the early Bronze Age. Around 2500 BC, a particularly distinctive culture group is discernible in north-western Anatolia, the 'Demircihüyük Culture'. Doryleion-Sharhöyük was at the center of these cultural developments. Sarhöyük V (ŞH V) layer with five subphases (1-5) of the city is one of the best represented cultural phases on the mound. A new Luwian hieroglyphic seal has been discovered there in 2018. This material represents the Hittite Imperial Period. The best preserved mudbrick architecture belongs to the ŞV-5, dating to the Hittite period. In the Iron Age, Sarhöyük IV was important under the Phrygians.

Stratigraphic periods:

- Şarhöyük VII = Early Bronze Age, Demircihöyük culture
- Şarhöyük VI = Middle Bronze Age
- Şarhöyük V = Late Bronze Age, Hittite period
- Şarhöyük IV = Iron Age, Phrygian period
- Şarhöyük III = Hellenistic period
- Şarhöyük II = Roman period
- Şarhöyük I = Byzantine period

== Ecclesiastical history ==
Dorylaeum became a bishopric under the Byzantine Empire and was a suffragan the Metropolitan of Synnada in Phrygia.

Seven bishops are known from the fourth to the ninth century, the most famous being Eusebius. The see is mentioned as late as the twelfth century among the suffragans of Synnada, but must have been suppressed soon after.

== See also ==
- List of ancient Greek cities
- Karacahisar Castle

== Sources ==
- Lindner, Rudi Paul (2007). Explorations in Ottoman Prehistory. University of Michigan Press. ISBN 978-0-472-09507-0.
- Thonemann, Peter (2011-09-22). The Maeander Valley: A Historical Geography from Antiquity to Byzantium. Cambridge University Press. ISBN 978-1-139-49935-4.
- Treadgold, Warren (1997). A History of the Byzantine State and Society. Stanford University Press. ISBN 0-8047-2630-2.
- Vryonis, Speros Jr. (1971). The decline of medieval Hellenism in Asia Minor and the process of Islamization from the eleventh through the fifteenth century. Berkeley: University of California Press. ISBN 9780520015975.
