= James Mellaart =

British archaeologist and forger (1925–2012)

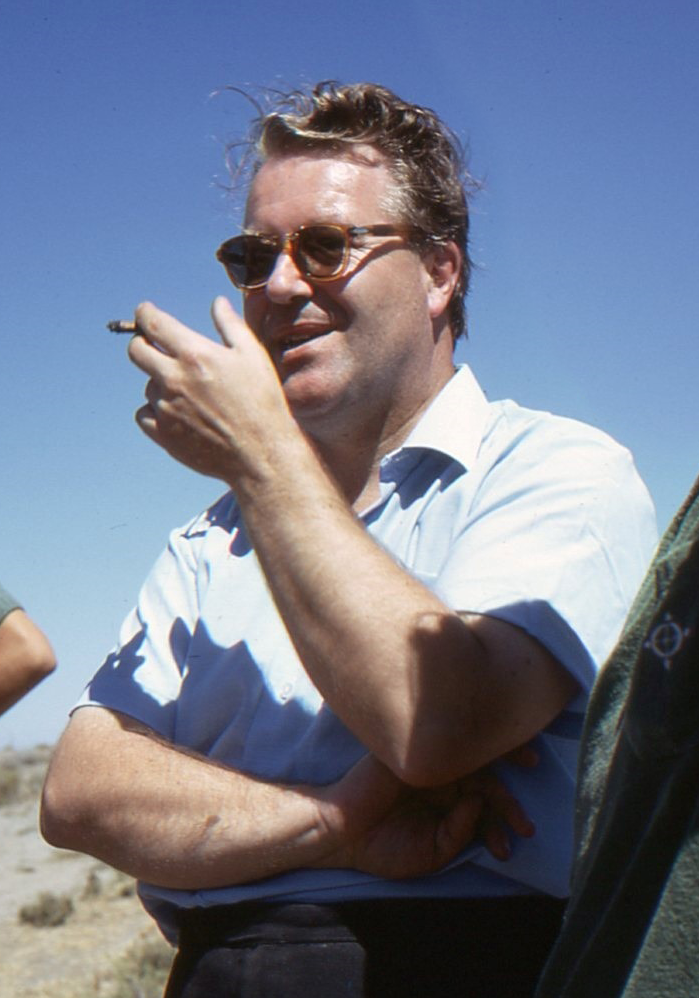
- Mellaart at Çatalhöyük
- Born: 14 November 1925; London, United Kingdom
- Died: 29 July 2012 (aged 86); London, United Kingdom
- Other name: Jimmy Mellaart
- Occupations: Archaeologist, forger
- Years active: 1951–91
- Spouse: Arlette Meryem Cenani 1954–2012 (his death)
- Children: Alan Mellaart

James Mellaart FBI (14 November 1925 – 29 July 2012) was a British-Dutch prehistorian and archaeologist. From 1959 to 1961 he was deputy director of the British Institute of Archaeology at Ankara (BIAA), then lecturer in prehistoric archaeology at Istanbul University until 1963. In 1964 he became lecturer in Anatolian archaeology at the Institute of Archaeology in London retiring in 1991.

His discoveries at Hacılar, Beycesultan and Çatalhöyük left a lasting mark on prehistoric archaeology; over his career, however, Mellaart also built an extensive system of forgeries to support interpretations that were often speculative from the outset, deliberately trading on his considerable scholarly standing to lend these constructions an appearance of credibility—a strategy that, in retrospect, devalues even his genuine achievements. His manipulations bred distrust among colleagues and at times demonstrably hampered his further career, yet the full extent of his fabrications only became public after his death, not least because of systematic institutional concealment.

== Biography ==
=== Origins, education and early formation ===
James Mellaart was born in London. Mellaart's father, Jacob Herman Jan Mellaart (1895–1972), a Dutch-born art expert, had moved to England shortly before his son's birth; his mother, Apollonia Dingena ("Linn") née van der Beek (1886 or 1899–1933), was from Ulster but also of Dutch descent. Mellaart had a younger sister, born also in London four years after him. He later claimed descent from Clan Donald (the MacLarty line) via Scotland, with the family moving to Holland in the late seventeenth century and Dutchifying its name—a claim not universally credited. The father's advisory work for art collectors afforded the family a comfortable house in Chelsea, but the collapse of the art market in the Great Depression forced a return to Amsterdam in 1932.

After his mother's death from gas poisoning in 1933, the father married the children's nanny and had four more sons with her. James and his sister harboured a lifelong aversion to their stepmother—he did not even attend her 1986 funeral—a hostility that may explain his suppression of his Dutch youth, his refusal to speak Dutch with Dutch colleagues, and his insistence, denying his Dutch ancestry, on a Scottish identity.

James Mellaart with his father, late 1940s or early 1950s

In the years that followed, the family moved repeatedly within the Netherlands—from Amsterdam to Rotterdam, then to The Hague, and, during the German occupation, to Maastricht. To evade forced labour service, Mellaart, through a friend of his father's, obtained a post at the Netherlands National Museum of Antiquities in Leiden: a letter of application dropping the names of numerous museum staff and archaeologists so impressed the museum's director that a position was created specially for the unqualified eighteen-year-old. His later claim that the Swiss consul had arranged the post cannot be substantiated, nor can his account of recovering an unexploded V-2 rocket during the war and handing it over to a senior American military officer. Mellaart was apparently unaware that a V-2 was 14 metres long.

In early September 1944 he returned to the family home in the southern Netherlands, ten days before the Americans entered Maastricht. After the liberation he took up the study of Egyptology and classical antiquity at Leiden and agreed to end his museum contract as of 1 October 1944; six months later, however, he unsuccessfully tried to have the agreement reversed and to claim back pay through May 1945 via a committee set up to resolve occupation-related grievances, causing irritation among a museum staff closely tied to the university's Egyptology and Classics departments and possibly damaging his standing as a student. He is said to have already acquired the ability to read Egyptian hieroglyphs while at the museum. At grammar school he had learned German, English, French, Latin and Ancient Greek; from a paternal uncle he also acquired Gaelic.

From 1947 he studied archaeology at University College London, joining excavations under Kathleen Kenyon at Sutton Walls and developing an early interest in the Sea Peoples and the twelfth-century BC collapse of the Bronze Age order, as well as the spread of Early Bronze Age cultures across the eastern Mediterranean. A doctoral project on the Sea Peoples, claimed to have begun in 1951, was never submitted.

=== Scientific beginnings ===
After graduating in 1951, Mellaart received a two-year fellowship at the BIAA, becoming its deputy director under Seton Lloyd in 1959, a post he held until 1961, before serving as lecturer in prehistoric archaeology at Istanbul University from 1961 to 1963. In 1964 he was appointed lecturer in Anatolian archaeology at UCL's Institute of Archaeology, remaining there until his retirement in 1991. During his BIAA years he surveyed numerous prehistoric sites across southwestern Anatolia and developed into an outstanding "site-spotter", able to recognise buried prehistoric settlements from slight surface undulations. In the course of this fieldwork he discovered hundreds of pre-classical sites, among them the major Chalcolithic and Bronze Age settlement of Beycesultan.

In this period he met Arlette Meryem Cenani (1924–2013), daughter of Marie Rosenthal (1897–1976), of a distinguished Istanbul Jewish family of Italian descent, and the non-practising Romanian Jew Beno Coppelovici. Marie left Beno around 1932 for Kadri Cenani, a Turkish businessman from a family of prominent Ottoman statesmen; she converted to Islam and married Kadri in Marseille in 1939, whereupon Coppelovici took his own life. In 1941 Kadri adopted Arlette. Encouraged by her stepfather, a former Istanbul Archaeology Museum staff member, Arlette attended Kurt Bittel's lectures on the Hittites at Istanbul University in the early 1950s and joined his 1952 excavations at Fikirtepe, where she met Mellaart. They married in April 1954 at the Cenani family's summer house; their son Alan Kadri was born in 1955.

Mellaart also directed his own fieldwork: a survey of the Jordan Valley, and Kathleen Kenyon's 1952–54 excavations at Jericho, where he dug deeper than authorised during one of her absences to show the tell's base lay lower than assumed. From 1954 to 1959 he worked with Seton Lloyd at Beycesultan, in the upper Menderes basin, recognising it as a major, long-occupied site; in 1956 he found Hacılar, 15 km north of Burdur, which he excavated 1957–60. Already in this period he produced his first forgeries.

=== Çatalhöyük and growing scholarly recognition ===
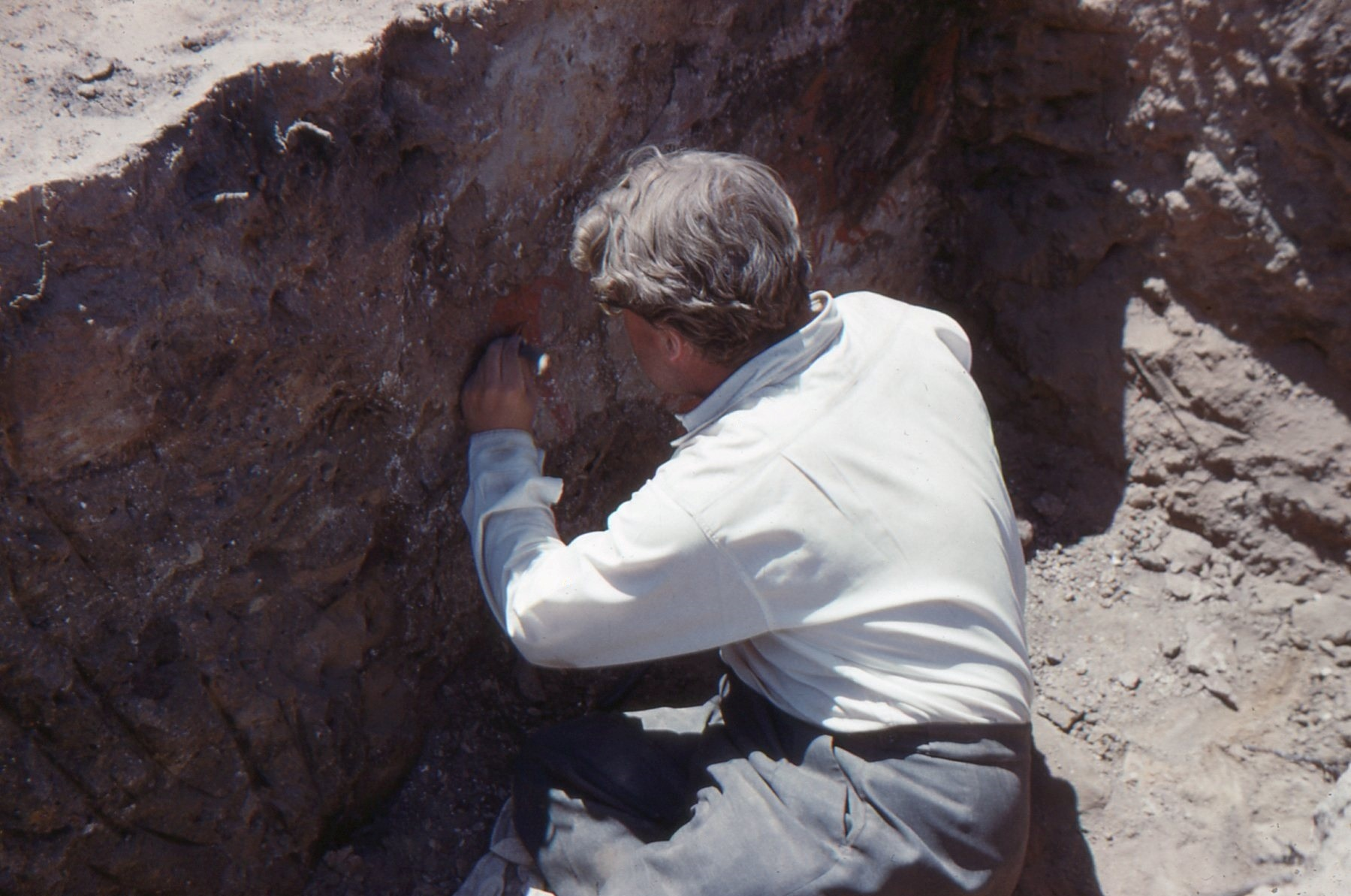
Mellaart excavating at Çatalhöyük

Decisive for Mellaart's later career, however, was not the Bronze Age but a Neolithic site: in November 1958, with David French and Alan Hall, he identified the Neolithic strata of Çatalhöyük in the Konya Plain. Though he had been searching for Bronze Age remains, the discovery redirected his interest to the Neolithisation of Anatolia, challenging the prevailing view that the key Neolithic developments had occurred in the Levant and Fertile Crescent.

Excavations began in 1961 and continued in 1962, 1963 and 1965. Mellaart uncovered a large number of elaborately furnished buildings distinguished by relief sculpture, bull's-horn installations and finely executed wall paintings; the artistic quality of these finds surprised scholars, since nothing comparable had previously been documented in the Near East. The settlement, one of the earliest agrarian communities in Anatolia, had existed for around 1,100 years and was characterised by tightly interlocking rooms entered exclusively through roof openings, their walls consistently and carefully plastered. The four campaigns revealed 19 metres of deposits across at least thirteen occupation levels, exposed more than 150 buildings, and recovered 480 skeletons; Mellaart's reconstructions and reports in the Illustrated London News carried the site's fame well beyond specialist circles.

His 1967 monograph Çatal Hüyük. A Neolithic Town in Anatolia argued that the core developments of the Neolithic Revolution originated essentially in Anatolia, unfolding over a "painfully slow", millennium-long process. The book continues to shape debate on early settlement density and social organisation and found broad interdisciplinary reception, from architecture and art to urban studies and anthropology.

=== The Dorak affair and its consequences ===
The first, and most consequential, controversy of Mellaart's career was the Dorak affair. In 1959 he published an article in the Illustrated London News about a royal grave treasure of the third millennium BC, said to have been excavated near the village of Dorak, north of Lake Uluabat, during the Greco-Turkish War and which he claimed to have seen at Karşıyaka. He said he had met a young, attractive Greek woman on a train to İzmir in 1951 or 1958, who invited him home to see valuable family antiquities; there he spent a long weekend documenting the pieces and found excavation notes in Modern Greek. The objects implied far-reaching Bronze Age contacts and challenged the established chronology of Early Bronze Age Troy.

Subsequent investigations revealed that neither the items described, nor the young woman, nor the address provided could be located. In May 1962, the Turkish press accused Mellaart of being involved in the illegal export from the country of the archaeological treasures he had described, which they estimated to be worth one billion Turkish lira. It appears that the local authorities in Izmir suspected from an early stage that the account must have been fabricated, given the very small number of Greeks living in the city at the time, who were moreover under constant official surveillance. A 1968 BIAA inquiry exonerated him, but the controversy persisted; in 1964 he lost his Çatalhöyük excavation permit, and in 1966 the BIAA withdrew patronage of the projects.

=== Further forgeries and scholarly misconduct ===
The scientific community’s rejection of the Dorak case did not deter Mellaart from introducing further forged material in the decades that followed: In the 1980s, he developed a second theory centered on supposed wall paintings from Çatalhöyük, which he interpreted as evidence of an ancient Anatolian kilim tradition and, increasingly, of a prehistoric cult of the "Great Goddess." At a carpet conference in London in 1983, he presented numerous motifs resembling modern kilims, though only one was documented; the remaining fragments of paintings he presented had been recorded but, as Mellaart claimed, had not survived. This thesis, revised in later publications, culminated in The Goddess from Anatolia (1989), featuring almost caricature-like white, crouching, snowman-like goddesses against garish backgrounds, flanked by oversized vulvas toward which winged phalli move in a penetrating motion.

The claims soon proved untenable. Kilim specialists demonstrated that the motifs could not have been woven with the technology available at the time, while archaeologists pointed to the lack of documentation and inconsistencies with the excavation reports. Later excavations at Çatalhöyük uncovered no comparable paintings.

Mellaart simultaneously introduced other undocumented material, including a supposed 4,000-year "chronicle," alleged Palaeolithic stones with goddess motifs, and objects from a 1963 sounding that had never appeared in the excavation record. Some of these objects were later found among his possessions in London and are regarded unequivocally as forgeries. As criticism mounted, Mellaart from 1991 offered ever new excuses: key drawings and photographs, he claimed, had burned in a 1976 fire at his father-in-law's villa, necessarily leaving his reconstructions incomplete. According to Ian Hodder, he even claimed around this time to have found the earliest writing tablets at Çatalhöyük. In 1993 he added dramatic volcanic landscapes—erupting volcanoes, destroyed round-hut settlements, identifiable Anatolian landmarks—shown to French amateur volcanologists and building on his earlier misreading of a genuine mural; these and further "plaquettes" grew ever more fantastical, evidently springing entirely from his imagination.

=== Death and the reckoning with his corpus of forgeries ===
In his early years at the Institute of Archaeology, Mellaart lived with his family at first in a small flat opposite the British Museum. Later they moved into a stately house on Springfield Road in St John's Wood, with an extensive garden. In 1975 the family acquired one half of a semi-detached house on Lichen Court; two years later they extended their holding by acquiring the adjoining second half. During their London years the Mellaarts undertook numerous journeys through the Near and Middle East. In 1980 he was elected a Fellow of the British Academy. In 1999 James and Arlette Mellaart returned once more to Çatalhöyük, where systematic excavations had resumed in 1993 under the direction of Ian Hodder. In 2007 Mellaart suffered a stroke, the effects of which permanently impaired his linguistic and mental faculties. Mellaart died on 29 July 2012 at the Whittington Hospital, Islington, from pneumonia; his funeral was held on 13 August at Islington Crematorium, East Finchley, and a memorial gathering of the 140-strong excavation team took place atop the Çatalhöyük mound. His wife Arlette died the following year, on 17 November 2013.

Early obituaries stressed his scholarly achievements, mentioning the decades-old forgery allegations, if at all, only in passing. A more critical reckoning began only in 2017, driven by controversial geologist and PR consultant Eberhard Zangger, who with the barely less controversial independent scholar Fred Woudhuizen presented two 1990s letters at an İzmir conference in which Mellaart claimed to be in possession of translations of cuneiform bronze tablets, found in late nineteenth-century Afyon province, that would fundamentally revise the history of Asia Minor at the Bronze–Iron Age transition. On the basis of the letters alone, Zangger and Woudhuizen declared the tablets genuine. That summer Zangger obtained the 67-page "translation" of the tablets from Mellaart's estate and drawings of Luwian hieroglyphic blocks Mellaart had shown colleagues since the 1980s and which they already regarded as forgeries. Zangger nonetheless judged the material genuine, publishing it in October 2017 in his book Die Luwier und der Trojanische Krieg amid considerable publicity, reading inconsistencies naively as signs of authenticity and attributing Mellaart's reluctance to publish the material academically to a fear of being accused of forgery once again following the Dorak affair—which Zangger interpreted as part of a heated scholarly dispute or intrigue.

With the announced Talanta publication of the inscription, several researchers noted they already knew it and considered it, with near certainty, a forgery. In their 2017 online edition at talanta.nl, Zangger and Woudhuizen acknowledged these objections while still defending Mellaart, arguing forgery could never be conclusively proven against him. Zangger had planned a five-year, foundation-funded study of Mellaart's estate, but a 2018 London visit confirmed what colleagues had long suspected: his study turned out to be a veritable forger's workshop—again announced with considerable media dramatisation. Zangger and Woudhuizen then dropped their claims for the cuneiform tablets' authenticity, though—with at times far-fetched arguments—continued defending the hieroglyphic inscription Beyköy 2, drawing sharp criticism. The 2018 Talanta special issue offered the first systematic account of Mellaart's forgeries, with further studies following.

== Assessment and legacy ==
Although close associates and colleagues had already seen through Mellaart's forgeries at an early stage, and although he even tried to draw his friends into his fabrications, yet his conduct went largely unaddressed for decades. His increasingly fantastical productions met with rejection and had no lasting scholarly effect; he seems to have cared little for their actual plausibility.

All his inventions served to shore up already questionable assumptions, with a recurring claim of continuity across vast stretches of time—Arzawan to Lydian dynasties, Neolithic to modern kilims, a Palaeolithic "Great Goddess" persisting to the present—Mellaart deploying his reputation to pass off pure invention as genuine findings, a strategy that, as Diether Schürr argues, ultimately devalues his achievements entirely.

== Selected works ==
A selection from Mellaart's substantial body of publications.

- Anatolian Chronology in the Early and Middle Bronze Age. In: Anatolian Studies 7 (1957), pp. 55–88.
- (with Seton Lloyd): Beycesultan, vols. 1–2, London 1962/65. Çatal Hüyük Excavations 1961. In: Archäologischer Anzeiger 1962, pp. 1–11.
- Excavations at Çatal Hüyük. First preliminary report, 1961. In: Anatolian Studies 12 (1962), pp. 41–65.
- Deities and Shrines of Neolithic Anatolia. Excavations at Çatal Hüyük 1962. In: Archaeology 16/1 (1963), pp. 29–38.
- Excavations at Çatal Hüyük. Second Preliminary Report, 1962. In: Anatolian Studies 13 (1963), pp. 43–103.
- Early Cultures of the South Anatolian Plateau II. The Late Chalcolithic and Early Bronze Ages in the Konya Plain. In: Anatolian Studies 13 (1963), pp. 199–236.
- Excavations at Çatal Hüyük. Third Preliminary Report, 1963. In: Anatolian Studies 14 (1964), pp. 39–119.
- Earliest Civilizations of the Near East, London 1965. Excavations at Çatal Hüyük. Fourth Preliminary Report, 1965. In: Anatolian Studies 16 (1966), pp. 15–191.
- The Chalcolithic and Early Bronze Ages in the Near East and Anatolia, Beirut 1966.
- Çatal Hüyük. A Neolithic Town in Anatolia, London 1967. Excavations at Hacılar, 2 vols., Edinburgh 1970. Western Anatolia, Beycesultan and the Hittites, Ankara 1974.
- The Neolithic of the Near East, London 1975.
- The Archaeology of Ancient Turkey. Rowman and Littlefield, Totowa NJ 1978.
- Some Notes on the Prehistory of Anatolian Kilims. In: Bertram Frauenknecht (ed.): Early Turkish Tapestries, Nuremberg 1984, pp. 25–41.
- (with Udo Hirsch/Belkıs Balpınar): The Goddess from Anatolia, 4 vols., Milan 1989.
- The Earliest Representations of the Goddess of Anatolia and Her Entourage. In: Jürg Rageth (ed.): Anatolische Kelims. Symposium Basel, Basel 1990, pp. 27–46.
- (with Ann Murray): Beycesultan, vol. 3/2, Late Bronze Age and Phrygian Pottery and Middle and Late Bronze Age Small Objects, London 1995.

== Literature ==
- Ian Hodder: James Mellaart, 1925–2012. In: Biographical Memoirs of Fellows of the British Academy 14 (2015), pp. 411–420 [PDF version].
- Ian Hodder: Mellaart, James. In: Oxford Dictionary of National Biography Online, January 2016 [accessed 21 June 2026].
- Jan Stronk/Maarten de Weerd (eds.): Talanta 50 (2018) [special issue responding to Zangger and Woudhuizen's discoveries and theses].
- Emma L. Baysal (ed.): James Mellaart. The Journey to Çatalhöyük, Istanbul 2020 [memorial volume; some contributions markedly apologetic].
- John David Hawkins: The Fantasies of James Mellaart. Fabrications of an Anatolian Archaeologist. In: The IOS Annual 24 (2024), pp. 103–127.
- Diether Schürr: Ein pathologischer Betrüger – James Mellaart. In: Gephyra 30 (2025), pp. 195–216 [PDF version].
