= Greco-Turkish War =

There have been several Greco-Turkish Wars:

- Orlov revolt (1770) Greeks' first major, organized Revolt against the Ottoman Empire with the support of Russia
- Greek War of Independence (1821–1830), against the Ottoman Empire, also called the Greek Revolution of 1821
- First Greco-Turkish War (1897) which occurred during the Cretan Revolt (1897–1898)
- Greek front of the First Balkan War (1912–1913)
- World War I (1914–1918) Greece and the Ottoman Empire were in the opposing alliances and fought in the Mediterranean and the Balkans Theatre in the Battle of Imbros and during the Allied occupation of Constantinople
- Second Greco-Turkish War (1919–1922), also called the Asia Minor Campaign or the Western Front of the Turkish War of Independence
- Turkish invasion of Cyprus (1974)

This term may also refer to the medieval predecessor civilisations of Greece and Turkey:

- Byzantine–Seljuk wars (1046–1243)
- Byzantine–Ottoman wars (1299–1479)

== See also ==
- Greece–Turkey relations
