= Dorak =

- Neighbourhood
- Location in Turkey Dorak (Marmara)
- Coordinates: 40.101°N 28.584°E
- Country: Turkey
- Province: Bursa
- District: Mustafakemalpaşa
- Population (2022): 135
- Time zone: UTC+3 (TRT)

Dorak is a neighbourhood of the municipality and district of Mustafakemalpaşa, Bursa Province, Turkey. Its population is 135 (2022).

Dorak is in northern Turkey, south of Lake Uluabat (also called lake Apaolyont, Turkish: Ulubat Gölü), 25 miles west of Bursa, approximately 20 miles south of the Sea of Marmara.

Dorak is the supposed origin of drawings of burial artifacts of the Yortan culture made by British archaeologist James Mellaart (known for his discovery of the Neolithic settlement of Çatalhöyük), taken by unknown person/s from shallow graves nearby during the Greco-Turkish War of 1919–22. Mellaart was the focus of the Dorak affair, a scandal concerning an unseen and undocumented group of antiquities, which took place in the 1950s and 1960s in Turkey. Mellaart was expelled from Turkey for suspicion of involvement with the antiquities black market.
