= Seton Lloyd =

British archaeologist

Seton Howard Frederick Lloyd, CBE (30 May 1902 – 7 January 1996), was an English archaeologist. He was President of the British School of Archaeology in Iraq, Director of the British Institute of Archaeology at Ankara (President, 1948–1961), Professor of Western Asiatic Archaeology in the Institute of Archaeology, University of London (1962–1969).

== Biography ==
Lloyd was born on 30 May 1902 in Birmingham, England. After education at Uppingham School, he studied at the Architectural Association in London and qualified as an architect in 1926.

He gained his first archaeological experience at Tel el Amarna, which Henri Frankfort was excavating for the Egypt Exploration Society. In 1930 Lloyd was invited by Frankfort to join latter's next excavation, under the auspices of the Oriental Institute of the University of Chicago, of a series of sites in the Diyala valley (1930–1937). In 1937–1939 he excavated with John Garstang at Mersin, in southern Turkey, for the University of Liverpool. In 1939 Lloyd was appointed Archaeological Adviser to the Directorate of Antiquities in Iraq, where he helped to establish the Iraq Museum and reorganize the Gertrude Bell Museum. He trained Iraqi archaeologists and participated with Iraqi colleagues in several major excavations, notably at 'Uqair and Eridu, at Assyrian Khorsabad, the Aqueduct of Sennacherib at Jerwan. He succeeded Max Mallowan as the President of the British School of Archaeology in Iraq. In 1948, he became Director of the British Institute of Archaeology at Ankara. He excavated with, among others, James Mellaart, one of the first scholars at the Ankara School, the mound at Beycesultan, in western Anatolia, and also conducted excavations at Polatli, Haran, Sultantepe and other Anatolian sites. He was succeeded by Michael Gough as Director of the British Institute of Archaeology at Ankara.

He died on 7 January 1996 in Faringdon, England.

== Selected works ==
- Sennacherib's Aqueduct at Jerwan, with Thorkild Jacobsen (1935)
- Mesopotamia: Excavations on Sumerian Sites (1936)
- Pre-Sargonid Temples in the Diyala Region, with Pinhas Delougaz (1942)
- Ruined Cities of Iraq (1942)
- Twin Rivers: A Brief History of Iraq from the Earliest Times to the Present Day (1943)
- Foundations in the Dust: A Story of Mesopotamian Exploration (1947, revised edition 1980)
- Early Anatolia: A Description of Early Civilisation in Asia Minor, As Revealed by the Last Half-Century of Excavating and Exploration (1956)
- The Art of the Ancient Near East, 'The World of Art Library' series (1961)
- Beycesultan, with James Mellaart (1962–1965)
- Mounds of the Ancient Near East (1963)
- Early Highland Peoples of Anatolia (1967)
- Private Houses and Graves in the Diyala Region, with Pinhas Delougaz and Harold D. Hill (1967)
- Ancient Architecture: Mesopotamia, Egypt, Crete, Greece, with Hans Wolfgang Müller and Roland Martin (1974)
- The Archaeology of Mesopotamia from the Old Stone Age to the Persian Conquest (1978)
- The Interval (1986)
- Ancient Turkey: A Traveller's History of Anatolia (1989)
