= Beyköy, İhsaniye =

Beyköy
- Village
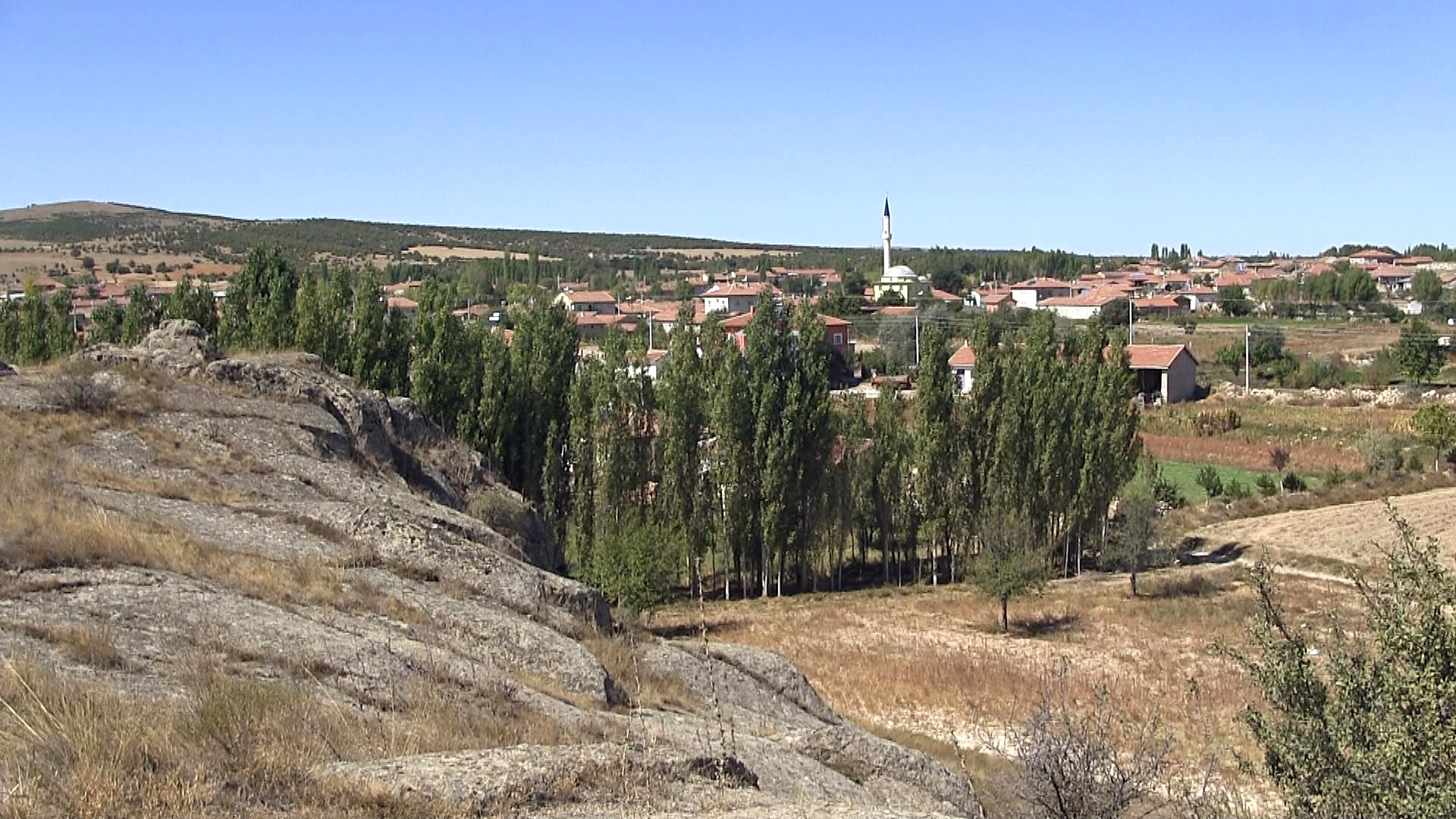

- Location within Turkey Location within Turkey Aegean
- Coordinates: 39.0461°N 30.4661°E
- Country: Turkey
- Province: Afyonkarahisar
- District: İhsaniye
- Population (2021): 864
- Time zone: UTC+3 (TRT)

Beyköy is a village in the İhsaniye District, Afyonkarahisar Province, Turkey. Its population is 864 (2021).
