= Manfred Korfmann =

German archeologist

- Born: April 26, 1942
- Died: August 11, 2005 (aged 63)
- Occupation: Archaeologist
- Known for: Excavations at the site of ancient Troy

Manfred Osman Korfmann (April 26, 1942 – August 11, 2005) was a German archeologist. He excavated Hisarlik, the present site of Troy situated in modern-day Turkey.

He continued his research in Turkey, excavating from 1982 to 1987 at Besik Bay, a few kilometres from the famous site of Hisarlik (the supposed location of Homer's Troy). In 1988 the Turkish government gave him an exclusive excavation license for Troy itself (which for academic purposes is internationally known as Troia, at his suggestion). Over many years, his team excavated large sections of the lower part of Troy, beneath the later Roman-era ruins. During the excavation campaign and under the direction of Korfmann, altogether 13,240 square meters of land were excavated by 370 archaeologists. Since Schliemann's work of Troy, there has been much dispute over its cultural and historical interpretation. While many ancient historians doubt the significance of the lower part of the settlement, Korfmann presented his argument that the bronze-age city at Hisarlik was quite large, and had played a key role in trade around the Dardanelles. Also, due to his initiative, in 2001, a major Troy exhibition was displayed in Stuttgart, "Troy - dream and reality". About 800,000 visitors visited this exhibition, but the way it presented the excavation findings, initially without proper labeling of reconstructions which were purely speculative, turned the scientific debate into a bitter controversy. In February 2002 in Tübingen, Korfmann presented the arguments for his conclusions over the decades of past scientific works in Troy. The main point of the controversy was the real size and interpretation of the bronze-age city; further excavation in August 2003 supported Korfmann's theory, and he announced that "Troy was much larger than so far accepted, which I can prove by my excavations". The diggings in the plains south of the hill and magneto-metric investigations told that Troy was 15 times larger than previously expected. Outside a moat was cut down into the bedrock measuring a width of 4 meters and a depth of 2.

Owing to Korfmann, the interest in Troy rose enormously, for his excavations again rekindled enthusiasm for the myths about Troy. In 1996 he helped to establish a national park around the Troy site and two years later UNESCO declared this site as World Cultural Heritage; many tourists come to see the excavation site. Professor Korfmann had accepted in 2004 the Turkish nationality given to him by the government of Turkey for his contribution to that country; he also took Osman as his middle name, acknowledging years of being known by the nickname of "Osman Bey". Apart from excavations in Troy, he also turned to excavation in other places around the Black Sea, notably Didigora and Udabno in Georgia.

Manfred Korfmann died of lung cancer on August 11, 2005, at the age of 63 in his home in Ofterdingen near Tübingen. He hoped that the excavations would continue and that the Turkish government would build a world-class museum near the site. He was survived by his wife, son, and daughter.

== Necrology ==
- Wilford, John Noble. "Manfred Korfmann, 63; Expanded Excavation at Troy" New York Times19 Aug 2005: C14.
