= Fred Woudhuizen =

Dutch historian and linguist (1959–2021)

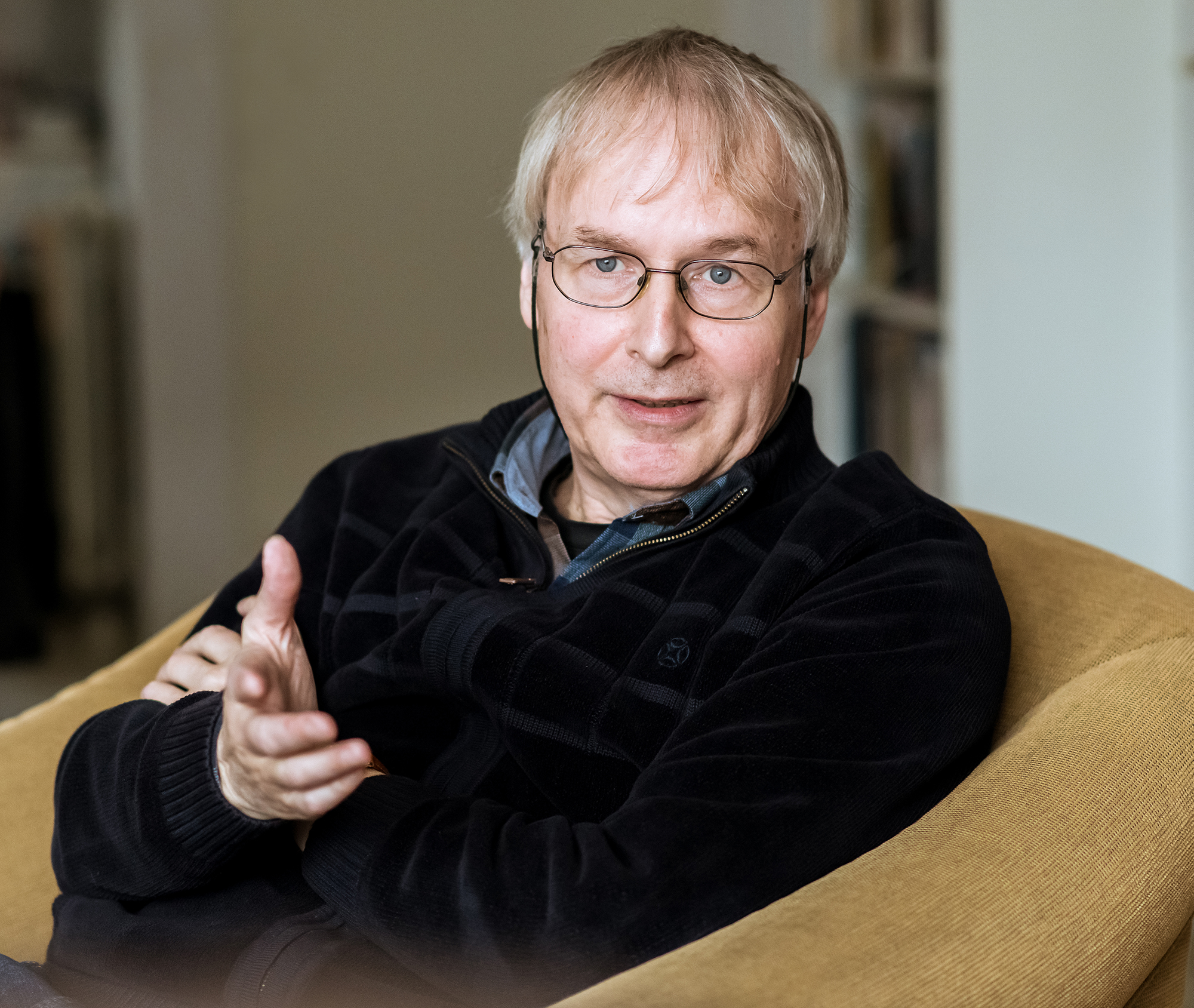
Fred C. Woudhuizen in Heiloo, 2020

Frederik Christiaan Woudhuizen (known as Fred C. Woudhuizen; 13 February 1959 – 28 September 2021) was a Dutch independent scholar who specialised in the languages and writing systems of the Bronze Age Mediterranean world. His research focused particularly on Luwian hieroglyphic writing, the Etruscan language, and fragmentarily attested languages of Cyprus, Anatolia, and the Aegean Sea. For more than two decades, he was closely associated with the Netherlands Archaeological and Historical Society (NAHG), serving at various times as a co-editor and later as editorial secretary of the society's journal.

== Life and work ==
Woudhuizen was born in 1959 in Zutphen; his parents had previously lived in the Dutch East Indies, and their repatriation constituted a profound disruption for them, involving the loss of their social status and economic position. After completing secondary school, he began studying history at the University of Amsterdam in 1977, graduating with distinction in 1985. His studies encompassed provincial Roman archaeology, the classical languages Latin and Greek, as well as the Luwian languages, Italo-Dalmatian languages, and Mycenaean studies. He eventually lived in Heiloo in the province of North Holland, where he died in 2021 after a prolonged illness from leukemia.

From the 1980s onward, Woudhuizen worked as an independent scholar, never holding a permanent university position; he conducted his research independently on the basis of extensive library work in Leiden and Amsterdam. In close collaboration with Jan G. P. Best, he published several studies on early writing systems and extinct languages of the Mediterranean world. At various times he worked as an accountant, while his livelihood was derived predominantly from social benefits, as severe psychological difficulties prevented him from maintaining regular employment on a permanent basis. From 1979 to 1992, he was a member of the Dutch Dyadovo Excavation Team, which participated in excavations at the settlement mound of Dyadovo in central Bulgaria. After a prolonged period of personal and health-related difficulties, he embarked on a doctoral project, and in 2006 received his doctorate at Erasmus University Rotterdam under Wim van Binsbergen with a dissertation on the ethnicity of the Sea Peoples. The dissertation attracted international attention and was widely discussed.

Woudhuizen's research focused on the decipherment, edition, and linguistic analysis of Etruscan texts, as well as on the study of Luwian hieroglyphic inscriptions from Anatolia. Within Etruscology, he devoted a series of detailed studies to the grammar, lexicon, and historical classification of the Etruscan language. He also worked on Lycian, Lydian, Sidetic, Carian, and Southwest Iberian, on processes of linguistic and cultural exchange in the eastern Mediterranean during the Bronze Age, and on questions concerning the ethnogenesis of the Sea Peoples and the Indo-European expansion. In addition to numerous scholarly articles, he published several monographs characterised by a strongly philological and comparative approach. While parts of his work received positive recognition in the scholarly community, his central theses concerning the interpretation of Etruscan, the Phaistos Disc, and the Cypro-Minoan texts, on the ethnogenesis of Mediterranean peoples in the Bronze Age, and on the spread of the Indo-European languages met with strong rejection and were regarded as lying outside the scholarly consensus. His later publications on Luwian hieroglyphic inscriptions were at times even classified as entirely unusable and pseudoscientific.

For more than two decades, Woudhuizen played a formative role in the Netherlands Archaeological and Historical Society (NAHG) and its journal Talanta. From 1986 to 1989 and again from 1992 to 1995, he served as a co-editor of the journal; during the final years of his life, he also assumed important organisational responsibilities as treasurer of the society and editorial secretary of the journal.

== Selected publications ==
Over the course of his scholarly career, Fred C. Woudhuizen published a large number of monographs and articles. The following is a selection.

Articles

- Etruscan Origins: The Epigraphic Evidence. In: Talanta 14–15 (1982/83), pp. 91–117.
- Lydian – Separated from Luwian by Three Signs. In: Talanta 16–17 (1984/85), pp. 91–113.
- The Recently Discovered Greek-Etruscan Bilingue from Delphi. In: Talanta 18–19 (1986/87), pp. 125–153.
- De Santorini-uitbarsting en de Ondergang van de Minoische Beschaving. In: J. H. Daams (ed.), Catastrofen, Bedreigingen van het bestaan, Amsterdam 1989, pp. 79–103.
- Thracians, Luwians and Greeks in Bronze Age Central Greece. In: Jan G. P. Best, Nanny M. W. de Vries (eds.), Thracians & Mycenaeans, Proceedings of the Fourth International Congress of Thracology (= Publications of the Henri Frankfort Foundation 11), Leiden 1989, pp. 191–204.
- Etruscan & Luwian. In: The Journal of Indo-European Studies 19/1–2 (1991), pp. 133–150.
- On the Dating of Luwian Great Kings. In: Talanta 24–25 (1992/93), pp. 167–219.
- Old Phrygian – Some Texts and Relations. In: The Journal of Indo-European Studies 21/1–2 (1993), pp. 1–25.
- Historical Backgrounds to the Old Phrygian-Greek Linguistic Relationship. In: Alexander Fol (ed.), Atti del VIº Congresso Internazionale di Tracologia, Palma de Mallorca 24–28 March 1992, Rome 1993, pp. 377–394.
- Tablet RS 20.25 from Ugarit. Evidence of Maritime Trade in the Final Years of the Bronze Age. In: Ugarit-Forschungen 26 (1994), pp. 509–538.
- Luwian Hieroglyphic Monumental Rock and Stone Inscriptions from the Hittite Empire Period. In: Talanta 26–27 (1994/95), pp. 153–217.
- The Late Hittite Empire in the Light of Recently Discovered Luwian Hieroglyphic Texts. In: The Journal of Indo-European Studies 23/1–2 (1995), pp. 53–81.
- The Celtic Nature of the Southwest Iberian Inscriptions. In: Talanta 30–31 (1998/99), pp. 159–174.
- Defining Atlantis in Space and Time. In: Ugarit-Forschungen 33 (2001), pp. 605–620.
- The Earliest Inscription from Thrace. In: Gocha R. Tsetskhladze, Jan G. de Boer (eds.), The Black Sea Region in the Greek, Roman, and Byzantine Period, Hoofddorp 2002, pp. 289–305.
- The Luwian Hieroglyphic Inscriptions of the Emirgazi Stone Altars. In: Ancient West & East 1/1 (2002), pp. 67–86.
- Some More on Cretan Hieroglyphic Seals. In: Talanta 36–37 (2004/05), pp. 171–186.
- The Language(s) of Linear A. An Updated Review Article. DO-SO-MO. In: Journal of Minoan, Mycenaean and Classical Studies 6 (2005), pp. 95–120.
- Middle Bronze Age Luwian Hieroglyphic and its Ramifications to Crete. In: Aygül Süel (ed.), Acts of the Vth International Congress of Hittitology, Çorum, September 2–8, 2002, Ankara 2005, pp. 731–746.
- Traces of Ethnic Identities in Etruscan Onomastics. In: Talanta 38–39 (2006/07), pp. 259–276.
- Great King Wasusarmas’ Victory Memorial at Topada. In: Ancient West & East 6 (2007), pp. 23–41.
- On the Byblos Script. In: Ugarit-Forschungen 39 (2008), pp. 689–756.
- (with Frits Waanders): Phrygian & Greek. In: Talanta 40–41 (2008/09), pp. 181–217.
- Towards a Chronological Framework for Significant Dialectal Tendencies in Indo-European. In: Journal of Indo-European Studies 38 (2010), pp. 41–131.
- The Recently Discovered Luwian Hieroglyphic Inscription from Tell Ahmar. In: Ancient West & East 9 (2010), pp. 1–19.
- Some More Etruscan Inscriptions. In: Talanta 42–43 (2010/11), pp. 215–234.
- Lycian Forms of the Enclitic Pronoun of the 3rd Person. An Overview of the Relevant Data. In: Colloquium Anatolicum XI (2012), pp. 415–436.
- Traces of Ethnic Diversity in Mycenaean Greece. In: Dacia, N.S. 57 (2013), pp. 5–21.
- Some Southwest Iberian Inscriptions. In: Talanta 46–47 (2014/15), pp. 299–334.
- The Geography of the Hittite Empire and the Distribution of Luwian Hieroglyphic Seals. In: Klio 97/1 (2015), pp. 7–31.
- Some Celtiberian Tesserae Hospitales. In: Ollodagos 31 (2015), pp. 3–36.
- Selected Cuneiform Luwian Texts. In: Talanta 48–49 (2016/17), pp. 329–367.
- The Ankara Silver Bowl. In: Ancient West & East 16 (2017), pp. 271–290.
- (with Eberhard Zangger): Rediscovered Luwian Hieroglyphic Inscriptions from Western Asia Minor. In: Talanta 50 (2018), pp. 9–56.
- (with Eberhard Zangger): Arguments for the Authenticity of the Luwian Hieroglyphic Texts from the Mellaart Files. In: Talanta 50 (2018), pp. 183–212.
- Carian – On the Luwian-Greek Interface. In: Živa Antika 68 (2018), pp. 5–24.
- On the Sea Peoples and Their Attacks on Egypt. In: Dacia, N.S. 62–63 (2018/19), pp. 331–350.
- Origin of the Luwian Hieroglyphic Script. In: Aygül Süel (ed.), Acts of the IXth International Congress of Hittitology, Çorum, September 08–14, 2014, Ankara 2019, pp. 1189–1213.
- Four Notes on Luwian Hieroglyphic. In: Ancient West & East 18 (2019), pp. 245–264.
- The Old Indo-European Layer in the Mediterranean as Represented by Hydronyms, Toponyms, and Ethnics. In: Journal of Indo-European Studies 48/1–2 (2020), pp. 41–60.
- The Byblos Script – An Update. In: Ugarit-Forschungen 51 (2022), pp. 315–342.
- Azawa, Assuwa, and Mira. Three Names for One and the Same Country in Western Anatolia. In: Ivo Hajnal et al. (eds.), The Political Geography of Western Anatolia in the Late Bronze Age, and the Region’s Interaction with its Neighbours, in Particular the Balkans, Innsbruck 2022, pp. 123–152.

Monographs

- (with Jan G. P. Best): Ancient Scripts from Crete and Cyprus (= Publications of the Henri Frankfort Foundation 9), Leiden 1988.
- (with Jan G. P. Best): Lost Languages from the Mediterranean (= Publications of the Henri Frankfort Foundation 10), Leiden 1989.
- Linguistica Tyrrhenica, A Compendium of Recent Results in Etruscan Linguistics, Amsterdam 1992.
- The Language of the Sea Peoples (= Publications of the Henri Frankfort Foundation 12), Amsterdam 1992.
- Linguistica Tyrrhenica. Vol. II: The Etruscan Liturgical Calendar from Capua, Addenda et Corrigenda ad Volume I, Leiden 1998.
- Luwian Hieroglyphic Monumental Rock and Stone Inscriptions from the Hittite Empire Period (= Innsbrucker Beiträge zur Kulturwissenschaft, Special Issue 116), Innsbruck 2004.
- Selected Luwian Hieroglyphic Texts. Vol. 1 (= Innsbrucker Beiträge zur Kulturwissenschaft, Special Issue 120), Innsbruck 2004.
- Selected Luwian Hieroglyphic Texts. Vol. 2 (= Innsbrucker Beiträge zur Kulturwissenschaft, Special Issue 124), Innsbruck 2004.
- The Earliest Cretan Scripts. Vol. 1 (= Innsbrucker Beiträge zur Kulturwissenschaft, Special Issue 125), Innsbruck 2006.
- The Ethnicity of the Sea Peoples. Erasmus University Rotterdam, 2006 (PDF version).
- Etruscan as a Colonial Luwian Language (= Linguistica Tyrrhenica III; Innsbrucker Beiträge zur Kulturwissenschaft, Special Issue 128), Innsbruck 2008.
- The Earliest Cretan Scripts. Vol. 2 (= Innsbrucker Beiträge zur Kulturwissenschaft, Special Issue 129), Innsbruck 2009.
- (with Wim van Binsbergen): Ethnicity in Mediterranean Protohistory (= British Archaeological Reports, International Series 2256), Oxford 2011 (PDF version).
- Selected Luwian Hieroglyphic Texts. The Extended Version (= Innsbrucker Beiträge zur Sprachwissenschaft 141), Innsbruck 2011.
- The Liber Linteus. A Word for Word Commentary to and Translation of the Longest Etruscan Text (= Innsbrucker Beiträge zur Kulturwissenschaft, N.S. 5), Innsbruck 2013.
- The Language of Linear C and Linear D from Cyprus (= Publications of the Henri Frankfort Foundation 15), Amsterdam 2017.
- The Luwians of Western Anatolia, Their Neighbours and Predecessors, Oxford 2018.
- Luwian Hieroglyphic Texts in Late Bronze Age Scribal Tradition (= Dresdner Beiträge zur Hethitologie 53), Wiesbaden 2021.
- (with Eberhard Zangger): Early Mediterranean Scripts. Conversations about Space and Time, Istanbul 2021.
