= Kuzi-Teshub =

Neo-Hittite king of Carchemish

Kuzi-Teshub (also read as Kunzi-Teshub) was a Neo-Hittite King of Carchemish, reigning in the early to mid-12th century BC, likely in 1180-1150 BC.

== Early life ==
He was the son of Talmi-Teshub, who was both the last viceroy of the Hittite Empire at Carchemish under Suppiluliuma II and a direct descendant of Suppiluliuma I. Kuzi-Teshub reigned in Carchemish as well as in the later Neo-Hittite city of Melid.

== Reign ==
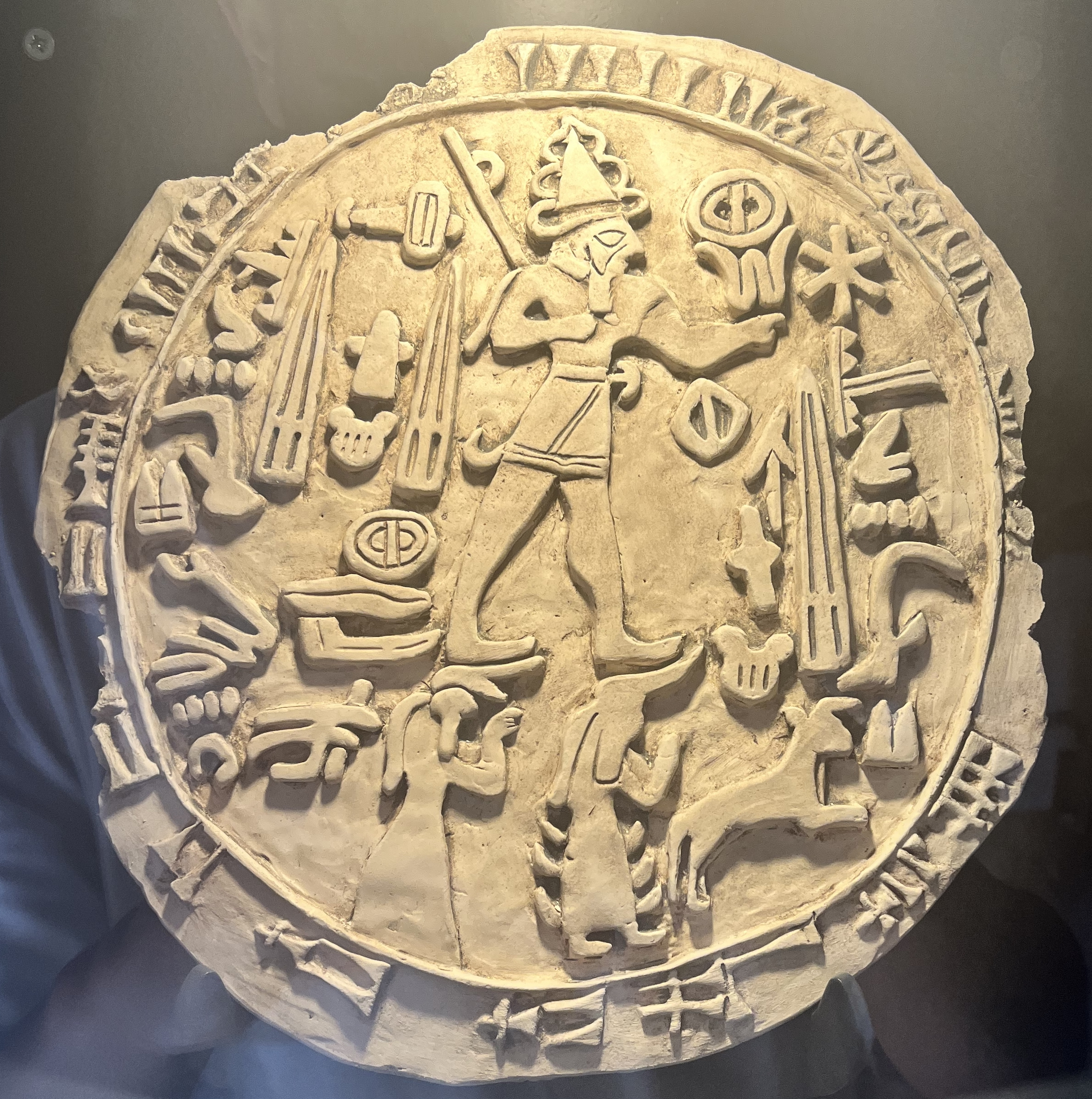
Seal of Kuzi-Tessub

=== Accession ===
In Carchemish, Kuzi-Teshub succeeded his father in office in at the beginning of the 12th century BC, probably first as viceroy, according to a two seal impressions found at Lidar Höyük in 1985 on the east bank of the Euphrates river. If he began his reign as viceroy of Carchemish, he may have ascended the throne toward the end of the reign of Suppiluliuma II of Hatti.

=== Fall of the Hittite Empire ===
Later Kuzi-Teshub styled himself as Great King of Carchemish, suggesting that the central Hittite dynasty at Hattusa had collapsed by this time and that he viewed himself as the legitimate heir of the line of Suppiluliuma I. Kuzi-Teshub is also styled as Great King in later inscriptions from Melid.

=== Kingdom of Kammanu (Melid) ===
Kuzi-Teshub is not proved to have ruled directly as King of Melid. On one hand, it is possible that he ruled directly in Melid, but on the other hand he may have installed his son Pugnus-mili I as the local ruler in Melid. Both Kuzi-Teshub and Pugnus-mili I are only known from inscriptions left by the autonomous kings of Melid, Runtiya and Arnuwanti I, who were sons of Pugnus-mili I and grandsons of Kuzi-Teshub. The references to Kuzi-Teshub in his grandsons' inscriptions may indicate that Melid had peacefully separated from Carchemish.

=== Death ===
When Kuzi-Teshub died, the next known Great King of Carchemish was Ir-Teshub/Ini-Teshub II. Ini-Teshub II (named after his great-grandfather) was presumably the son and successor of Kuzi-Teshub, and elder brother of Pugnus-mili of Kammanu.

== Family Tree ==
Hittite New Kingdom royal family tree according to Trevor Bryce

Kantuzilli (Note: Scholars have suggested that Tudhaliya I/II was possibly a grandson of the Hittite king Huzziya II; the first Tudhaliya is now known to be the son of Kantuzzili (Bryce 1997, p. 131 suggested Himuili, but the new edition, Bryce 2005, p. 122, indicated Kantuzzili).)
Tudhaliya I/II (Note: Bryce (1997) does not consider it clear whether Tudhaliya I/II was one king or two (p. 133); the link points to Tudhaliya II. Among those who identify distinct kings Tudhaliya I and Tudhaliya II, Freu (2007) has Kantuzzili—his son Tudhaliya I—his son Hattusili II—his son Tudhaliya II (p. 311).)	Nikkalmati (Note: Bryce (1997), p. 139.)
Arnuwanda I	Asmunikal
Hattusili II? (Note: The existence of Hattusili II is doubted by many scholars (Bryce 1997, pp. 153–154; Bryce 2005, p. 141). Among those who accept the existence of Hattusili II, Freu (2007), p. 311, has Tudhaliya I—his son Hattusili II—his son Tudhaliya II.)	Tudhaliya III (Note: Bryce (1997), p. 158.)	Daduhepa (Note: Bryce (1997), p. 172.)	Zida (Note: Bryce (1997), p. 174.)
Tudhaliya the Younger (Note: Bryce (1997), p. 168.)	Henti (1)	Šuppiluliuma I	(2) Tawananna (Note: Also known as Malnigal; daughter of Burnaburias II of Babylonia (Bryce 1997, p. 173).)
Arnuwanda II	Telipinu (Note: ‘Great priest’ in Kizzuwadna and king (lugal) of Aleppo (Bryce 1997, p. 174).)	Sarri-Kusuh (Note: King (lugal) of Carchemish.) (Note: Bryce (1997), pp. 174, 203–204.)	Zannanza (Note: Zannanza died on his way to Egypt to marry a pharaoh's widow, probably Ankhesenpaaten, the widow of Tutankhamun (Bryce 1997, pp. 196–198).)	Gassulawiya (Note: Bryce (1997), p. 227.) (1)	Mursili II	(2) Tanuhepa (Note: Bryce (1997), p. 230.)
Talmi-Sarruma (Note: Bryce (1997), p. 220.)	Sahurunuwa (Note: Bryce (1997), p. 222.)	Muwatalli II	Halpasulupi (Note: Haas (2006), p. 91.)	Massanauzzi (Note: Massanauzzi married Masturi, king of the Seha River Land (Bryce 1997, p. 313).)	Hattusili III (Note: Bryce (1997), p. 296.)	Puduhepa (Note: Puduhepa was the daughter of the Kizzuwadnan priest Pentipsarri (Bryce 1997, p. 273).)
Ini-Tesub (Note: Bryce (1997), pp. 346, 363.)	Urhi-Tesub	Kurunta (Note: King (lugal) of Tarhuntassa (Bryce 1997, p. 296); apparently later Great King of Hatti (Bryce 1997, p. 354).)	Nerikkaili (Note: Nerikkaili married a daughter of Bentesina, king of Amurru (Bryce 1997, p. 294).)	numerous daughters (Note: Two daughters of Hattusili III were married to the pharaoh Ramesses II; one was given the Egyptian name Ma(hor)nefrure. Another, Gassuwaliya, married into the royal house of Amurru. Kilushepa was married to a king of Isuwa. A daughter married into the royal family of Babylon. A sister of Tudhaliya IV married Sausgamuwa, king of Amurru after his father Bentesina. From Bryce (1997), pp. 294 and 312.) and sons (Note: Bryce (1997), p. 332.)	Tudhaliya IV (Note: Bryce (1997), p. 363. Tudhaliya IV probably married a Babylonian princess, known by her title of Great Princess (dumu.sal gal) (Bryce 1997, pp. 294, 331).)
Talmi-Tesub (Note: Bryce (1997), p. 363.)	Arnuwanda III (Note: Bryce (1997), p. 361.)	Suppiluliuma II (Note: Last documented Great King of the Land of Hatti.)
Kuzi-Tesub (Note: King and then Great King of Carchemish (Bryce 1997, pp. 384–385).)

- (1) = 1st spouse
- (2) = 2nd spouse
- Small caps indicates a Great King (LUGAL.GAL) of the Land of Hatti; italic small caps indicates a Great Queen or Tawananna.
- Dashed lines indicate adoption.
- Solid lines indicate marriage (if horizontal) or parentage (if vertical).

References:
- Trevor Bryce (1997). The Kingdom of the Hittites. Oxford, England: Clarendon Press.
- Trevor Bryce (2005). The Kingdom of the Hittites (new edition). Oxford, England: Clarendon Press.
- Trevor Bryce (2012). The World of the Neo-Hittite Kingdoms. Oxford, England: Oxford University Press.
- Jacques Freu (2007). Les débuts du nouvel empire hittite. Paris, France: L'Harmattan.
- Volkert Haas (2006). Die hethitische Literatur. Berlin, Germany: de Gruyter.

== Literature ==
- Bryce, Trevor R. (1998). The Kingdom of the Hittites. Oxford University Press.
- Bryce, Trevor (2012). The World of the Neo-Hittite Kingdoms: A Political and Military History. Oxford, New York: Oxford University Press. ISBN 978-0-19-921872-1.
- Gilibert, Alessandra (2011). Syro-Hittite Monumental Art and the Archaeology of Performance. Berlin: De Gruyter. ISBN 978-3-11-022225-8.

Preceded by Talmi-Teshub I	King of Carchemish early to mid-12th century BC	Succeeded by Ir-Teshub
Preceded by Unknown	King of Melid early to mid-12th century BC	Succeeded by PUGNUS-mili I
