= Ašmu-nikal =

Asmu-Nikkal

Queen consort of Hittite
- Tenure: c. 1385 BC
- King: Arnuwanda I
- Spouse: Arnuwanda I
- Issue: Tudhaliya III; Asmi-Sarruma; Mannini; Pariyawatra; Kantuzzili; Tulpi-Tessub
- Mother: Nikal-mati

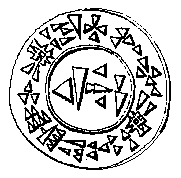

Ašmu-nikal or Ašmu-Nikkal (fl. c. 1385 BC) was a Queen consort of Hittite.

== Biography ==
Ašmu-Nikkal was born as a princess. Her father may have been the Hittite great king Tudḫaliya II (also called Tudḫaliya I/II) and Queen Nikkal-mati. She married Arnuwanda I, who became Tudḫaliya II's heir, co-ruler, and eventual successor. The nature of the relationship between Ašmu-Nikkal and her husband Arnuwanda I was long controversial, since both are described as children of Tudḫaliya II on their respective seals, ostensibly implying that they were siblings or at least half-siblings. This, however, was clearly forbidden by Hittite custom and law, and it is now generally agreed that while Ašmu-Nikkal was indeed the daughter of Tudḫaliya II, Arnuwanda was only his son-in-law and possibly adoptive son, as the daughter's antiyant husband, an acceptable heir in the absence of a son.

Ašmu-Nikkal and Arnuwanda I appear to have had several sons: The future king Tudḫaliya III, Ašmi-Šarruma, Mannini, Pariyawatra, Kantuzzili, and Tulpi-Teššub. Through her son Tudḫaliya III, she was the grandmother of Tudhaliya the Younger and of Henti, the wife of Šuppiluliuma I.

Ašmu-Nikkal, great queen of Hatti, seems to have actively participated in the government of her husband Arnuwanda I, and is cited with him in administrative documents and oaths. Together with Arnuwanda I, she offered up prayers to the gods to alleviate the Kaška invasion of the northern portions of the Hittite kingdom. Some instructions and decrees, for example those regarding the rights and entitlements of the "mausoleum guardians," were issued in the queen's name alone. It is possible that Ašmu-Nikkal survived her husband.

== Gallery ==
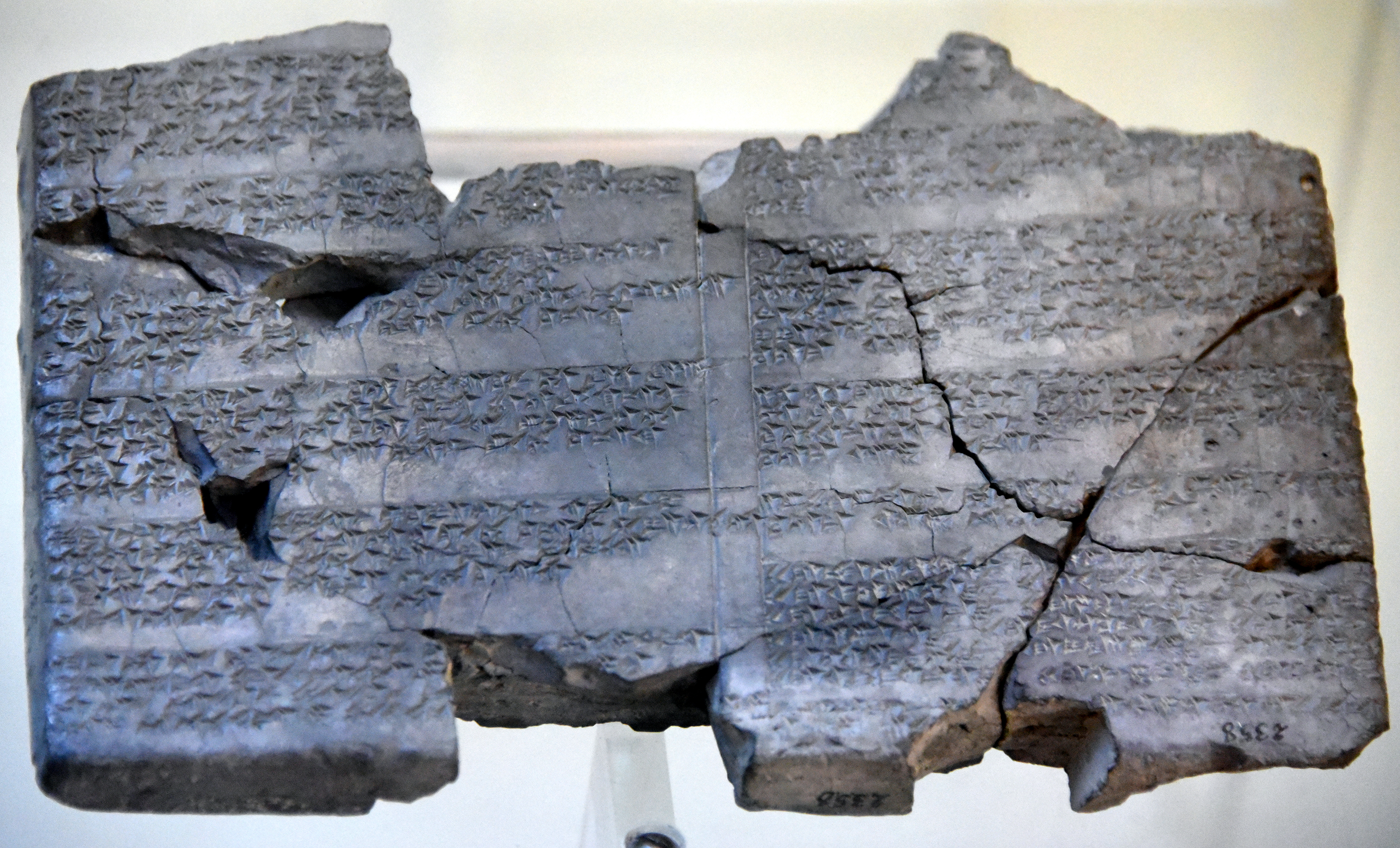
Prayers of Arnuwanda and Asmu-Nikkal, 14th century BC, from Hattusa, Istanbul Archaeological Museum

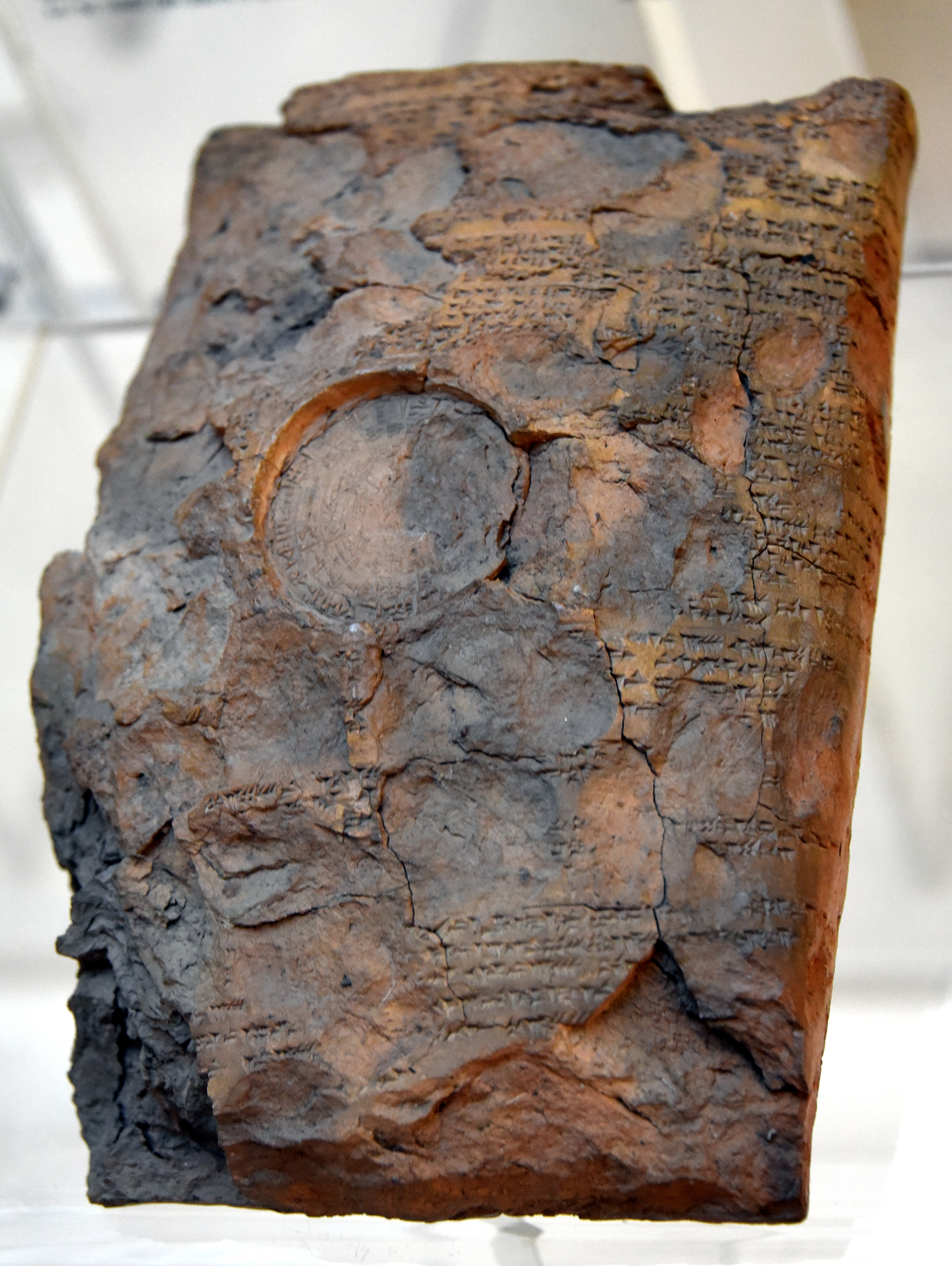
Gifts given by Arnuwanda and Asmu-Nikkal, 14th century BC, from Hattusa, Istanbul Archaeological Museum

Hittite New Kingdom royal family tree according to Trevor Bryce

Kantuzilli (Note: Scholars have suggested that Tudhaliya I/II was possibly a grandson of the Hittite king Huzziya II; the first Tudhaliya is now known to be the son of Kantuzzili (Bryce 1997, p. 131 suggested Himuili, but the new edition, Bryce 2005, p. 122, indicated Kantuzzili).)
Tudhaliya I/II (Note: Bryce (1997) does not consider it clear whether Tudhaliya I/II was one king or two (p. 133); the link points to Tudhaliya II. Among those who identify distinct kings Tudhaliya I and Tudhaliya II, Freu (2007) has Kantuzzili—his son Tudhaliya I—his son Hattusili II—his son Tudhaliya II (p. 311).)	Nikkalmati (Note: Bryce (1997), p. 139.)
Arnuwanda I	Asmunikal
Hattusili II? (Note: The existence of Hattusili II is doubted by many scholars (Bryce 1997, pp. 153–154; Bryce 2005, p. 141). Among those who accept the existence of Hattusili II, Freu (2007), p. 311, has Tudhaliya I—his son Hattusili II—his son Tudhaliya II.)	Tudhaliya III (Note: Bryce (1997), p. 158.)	Daduhepa (Note: Bryce (1997), p. 172.)	Zida (Note: Bryce (1997), p. 174.)
Tudhaliya the Younger (Note: Bryce (1997), p. 168.)	Henti (1)	Šuppiluliuma I	(2) Tawananna (Note: Also known as Malnigal; daughter of Burnaburias II of Babylonia (Bryce 1997, p. 173).)
Arnuwanda II	Telipinu (Note: ‘Great priest’ in Kizzuwadna and king (lugal) of Aleppo (Bryce 1997, p. 174).)	Sarri-Kusuh (Note: King (lugal) of Carchemish.) (Note: Bryce (1997), pp. 174, 203–204.)	Zannanza (Note: Zannanza died on his way to Egypt to marry a pharaoh's widow, probably Ankhesenpaaten, the widow of Tutankhamun (Bryce 1997, pp. 196–198).)	Gassulawiya (Note: Bryce (1997), p. 227.) (1)	Mursili II	(2) Tanuhepa (Note: Bryce (1997), p. 230.)
Talmi-Sarruma (Note: Bryce (1997), p. 220.)	Sahurunuwa (Note: Bryce (1997), p. 222.)	Muwatalli II	Halpasulupi (Note: Haas (2006), p. 91.)	Massanauzzi (Note: Massanauzzi married Masturi, king of the Seha River Land (Bryce 1997, p. 313).)	Hattusili III (Note: Bryce (1997), p. 296.)	Puduhepa (Note: Puduhepa was the daughter of the Kizzuwadnan priest Pentipsarri (Bryce 1997, p. 273).)
Ini-Tesub (Note: Bryce (1997), pp. 346, 363.)	Urhi-Tesub	Kurunta (Note: King (lugal) of Tarhuntassa (Bryce 1997, p. 296); apparently later Great King of Hatti (Bryce 1997, p. 354).)	Nerikkaili (Note: Nerikkaili married a daughter of Bentesina, king of Amurru (Bryce 1997, p. 294).)	numerous daughters (Note: Two daughters of Hattusili III were married to the pharaoh Ramesses II; one was given the Egyptian name Ma(hor)nefrure. Another, Gassuwaliya, married into the royal house of Amurru. Kilushepa was married to a king of Isuwa. A daughter married into the royal family of Babylon. A sister of Tudhaliya IV married Sausgamuwa, king of Amurru after his father Bentesina. From Bryce (1997), pp. 294 and 312.) and sons (Note: Bryce (1997), p. 332.)	Tudhaliya IV (Note: Bryce (1997), p. 363. Tudhaliya IV probably married a Babylonian princess, known by her title of Great Princess (dumu.sal gal) (Bryce 1997, pp. 294, 331).)
Talmi-Tesub (Note: Bryce (1997), p. 363.)	Arnuwanda III (Note: Bryce (1997), p. 361.)	Suppiluliuma II (Note: Last documented Great King of the Land of Hatti.)
Kuzi-Tesub (Note: King and then Great King of Carchemish (Bryce 1997, pp. 384–385).)

- (1) = 1st spouse
- (2) = 2nd spouse
- Small caps indicates a Great King (LUGAL.GAL) of the Land of Hatti; italic small caps indicates a Great Queen or Tawananna.
- Dashed lines indicate adoption.
- Solid lines indicate marriage (if horizontal) or parentage (if vertical).

References:
- Trevor Bryce (1997). The Kingdom of the Hittites. Oxford, England: Clarendon Press.
- Trevor Bryce (2005). The Kingdom of the Hittites (new edition). Oxford, England: Clarendon Press.
- Trevor Bryce (2012). The World of the Neo-Hittite Kingdoms. Oxford, England: Oxford University Press.
- Jacques Freu (2007). Les débuts du nouvel empire hittite. Paris, France: L'Harmattan.
- Volkert Haas (2006). Die hethitische Literatur. Berlin, Germany: de Gruyter.

== Bibliography ==
- Astour, Michael C. (1989), Hittite History and the Absolute Chronology of the Bronze Age, Partille.
- Beal, Richard R. (1983), "Studies in Hittite History," Journal of Cuneiform Studies 35 (1983) 115-126.
- Bryce, Trevor (2005), The Kingdom of the Hittites, Oxford.
- De Martino, Stefano (2010), "Nomi di persona hurriti nella prima età imperiale ittita," Orientalia 79 (2010) 130-139.
- Freu, Jacques, and Michel Mazoyer (2007b), Les débuts du nouvel empire hittite, Paris.
- Klengel, Horst (1999), Geschichte des Hethitischen Reiches, Leiden.
- Stavi, Boaz (2011), "The Genealogy of Suppiluliuma I," Altorientalische Forschungen 38 (2011) 226–239. online
- Taracha, Piotr (2016), "Tudhaliya III's Queens, Šuppiluliuma's Accession and Related Issues," in Sedat Erkut and Özlem Sir Gavaz (eds.), Studies in Honour of Ahmet Ünal Armağanı, Istanbul: 489-498.
- Weeden, Mark (2022), "The Hittite Empire," in Karen Radner et al. (eds.), The Oxford History of the Ancient Near East, vol. 3 (From the * Hyksos to the Late Second Millennium BC), Oxford: 529-622.
