= Talmi-Teshub =

Talmi-Teshub (Talmi-Teššup) was the King of Carchemish in Syria, and viceroy in the Hittite Empire, during the reign of his overlord Great King Suppiluliuma II of Hatti.

== Early life ==
He belonged to a local dynasty which was a branch of the Hittite royal family descending from Suppiluliuma I. He was the son of Ini-Teshub and great-great-great-grandson of Suppiluliuma I.

== Reign ==
At Carchemish, Talmi-Teshub (r. 12xx-11xx BC) had the status as a regional king and viceroy to his overlord, the Great King of Hatti. He was preceded by Ini-Teshub and succeeded by Kuzu-Teshub. We know very little from his reign during which time the Hittite Empire was struggling.

As part of the Hittite Empire, Carchemish was the regional center in the eastern part of the empire bordering the frontier against Assyria.

- The Treaty of Šuppiluliuma II with Talmi-Teššup of Karkamiš (CTH 122).
- A very fragmented text CTH 126 may date to the same period referring to a certain Šakuwasharit mentioned in both texts.

=== Death ===
According to royal seal impressions found at Lidar Höyük found in 1985 on the east bank of the Euphrates river, Talmi-Teshub was succeeded by his own son, Kuzi-Teshub.

== Family Tree ==
Hittite New Kingdom royal family tree according to Trevor Bryce

Kantuzilli (Note: Scholars have suggested that Tudhaliya I/II was possibly a grandson of the Hittite king Huzziya II; the first Tudhaliya is now known to be the son of Kantuzzili (Bryce 1997, p. 131 suggested Himuili, but the new edition, Bryce 2005, p. 122, indicated Kantuzzili).)
Tudhaliya I/II (Note: Bryce (1997) does not consider it clear whether Tudhaliya I/II was one king or two (p. 133); the link points to Tudhaliya II. Among those who identify distinct kings Tudhaliya I and Tudhaliya II, Freu (2007) has Kantuzzili—his son Tudhaliya I—his son Hattusili II—his son Tudhaliya II (p. 311).)	Nikkalmati (Note: Bryce (1997), p. 139.)
Arnuwanda I	Asmunikal
Hattusili II? (Note: The existence of Hattusili II is doubted by many scholars (Bryce 1997, pp. 153–154; Bryce 2005, p. 141). Among those who accept the existence of Hattusili II, Freu (2007), p. 311, has Tudhaliya I—his son Hattusili II—his son Tudhaliya II.)	Tudhaliya III (Note: Bryce (1997), p. 158.)	Daduhepa (Note: Bryce (1997), p. 172.)	Zida (Note: Bryce (1997), p. 174.)
Tudhaliya the Younger (Note: Bryce (1997), p. 168.)	Henti (1)	Šuppiluliuma I	(2) Tawananna (Note: Also known as Malnigal; daughter of Burnaburias II of Babylonia (Bryce 1997, p. 173).)
Arnuwanda II	Telipinu (Note: ‘Great priest’ in Kizzuwadna and king (lugal) of Aleppo (Bryce 1997, p. 174).)	Sarri-Kusuh (Note: King (lugal) of Carchemish.) (Note: Bryce (1997), pp. 174, 203–204.)	Zannanza (Note: Zannanza died on his way to Egypt to marry a pharaoh's widow, probably Ankhesenpaaten, the widow of Tutankhamun (Bryce 1997, pp. 196–198).)	Gassulawiya (Note: Bryce (1997), p. 227.) (1)	Mursili II	(2) Tanuhepa (Note: Bryce (1997), p. 230.)
Talmi-Sarruma (Note: Bryce (1997), p. 220.)	Sahurunuwa (Note: Bryce (1997), p. 222.)	Muwatalli II	Halpasulupi (Note: Haas (2006), p. 91.)	Massanauzzi (Note: Massanauzzi married Masturi, king of the Seha River Land (Bryce 1997, p. 313).)	Hattusili III (Note: Bryce (1997), p. 296.)	Puduhepa (Note: Puduhepa was the daughter of the Kizzuwadnan priest Pentipsarri (Bryce 1997, p. 273).)
Ini-Tesub (Note: Bryce (1997), pp. 346, 363.)	Urhi-Tesub	Kurunta (Note: King (lugal) of Tarhuntassa (Bryce 1997, p. 296); apparently later Great King of Hatti (Bryce 1997, p. 354).)	Nerikkaili (Note: Nerikkaili married a daughter of Bentesina, king of Amurru (Bryce 1997, p. 294).)	numerous daughters (Note: Two daughters of Hattusili III were married to the pharaoh Ramesses II; one was given the Egyptian name Ma(hor)nefrure. Another, Gassuwaliya, married into the royal house of Amurru. Kilushepa was married to a king of Isuwa. A daughter married into the royal family of Babylon. A sister of Tudhaliya IV married Sausgamuwa, king of Amurru after his father Bentesina. From Bryce (1997), pp. 294 and 312.) and sons (Note: Bryce (1997), p. 332.)	Tudhaliya IV (Note: Bryce (1997), p. 363. Tudhaliya IV probably married a Babylonian princess, known by her title of Great Princess (dumu.sal gal) (Bryce 1997, pp. 294, 331).)
Talmi-Tesub (Note: Bryce (1997), p. 363.)	Arnuwanda III (Note: Bryce (1997), p. 361.)	Suppiluliuma II (Note: Last documented Great King of the Land of Hatti.)
Kuzi-Tesub (Note: King and then Great King of Carchemish (Bryce 1997, pp. 384–385).)

- (1) = 1st spouse
- (2) = 2nd spouse
- Small caps indicates a Great King (LUGAL.GAL) of the Land of Hatti; italic small caps indicates a Great Queen or Tawananna.
- Dashed lines indicate adoption.
- Solid lines indicate marriage (if horizontal) or parentage (if vertical).

References:
- Trevor Bryce (1997). The Kingdom of the Hittites. Oxford, England: Clarendon Press.
- Trevor Bryce (2005). The Kingdom of the Hittites (new edition). Oxford, England: Clarendon Press.
- Trevor Bryce (2012). The World of the Neo-Hittite Kingdoms. Oxford, England: Oxford University Press.
- Jacques Freu (2007). Les débuts du nouvel empire hittite. Paris, France: L'Harmattan.
- Volkert Haas (2006). Die hethitische Literatur. Berlin, Germany: de Gruyter.
Notes:

Preceded by Ini-Teshub I	King of Carchemish ca. 1200 BC	Succeeded by Kuzi-Teshub
