= Piyassili =

Piyassili (also transliterated as Piyaššili; died ca. 1315 BC), also known as Sarri-Kusuh (or Šarri-Kušuḫ), was a Hittite prince and a middle son of King Šuppiluliuma I—younger than the heir Arnuwanda II, but older than the eventual successor Muršili II and probably older than the ill-fated Zannanza too. After Šuppiluliuma concluded a treaty with Shattiwaza, son of King Tushratta of Mitanni, and married one of his daughters to him, Piyassili led a Hittite army that put Shattiwaza on the throne of Hanigalbat. According to Hittite sources, Piyassili and Shattiwaza crossed the Euphrates at Carchemish, then marched against Irridu, already in Hurrian territory. After having reduced Irridu and Harran, they continued east towards to Washukanni and perhaps conquered the capital Taite as well.

== Biography ==
After Shattiwaza had been made a vassal ruler of Hanigalbat, Suppiluliuma gave to Piyassili the Hurrian name Sarri-Kusuh and the territory of Ashtata (with the cities of Ekalte, Ahuna and Terqa) and Carchemish, formerly belonging to Hanigalbat. "And all of the cities of the land of Carchemish, Murmurik, Shipri, Mazuwati and Šurun – these fortified cities– I gave to my son." In fact, the whole former territory of Hanigalbat west of the Euphrates seems to have come under direct Hittite rule and was governed by Piyassili.

When the Egyptians attacked Kadesh, Šuppiluliuma besieged and retook the town. The people were deported and Šuppiluliuma made Piyassili governor of that town as well. Still bearing the name "Sarri-Kusuh" Piyashshili came to Muršili's aid in the campaign against Arzawa around 1320 BC. Piyassili then returned to Carchemish.

Piyassili fell ill and died before the ninth year of Muršili II's reign. After his death, a rebellion broke out in Kadesh and Nuhašše. After it had been quelled, Piyassili's son was made king of Carchemish by his uncle Muršili II.

Hittite New Kingdom royal family tree according to Trevor Bryce

Kantuzilli (Note: Scholars have suggested that Tudhaliya I/II was possibly a grandson of the Hittite king Huzziya II; the first Tudhaliya is now known to be the son of Kantuzzili (Bryce 1997, p. 131 suggested Himuili, but the new edition, Bryce 2005, p. 122, indicated Kantuzzili).)
Tudhaliya I/II (Note: Bryce (1997) does not consider it clear whether Tudhaliya I/II was one king or two (p. 133); the link points to Tudhaliya II. Among those who identify distinct kings Tudhaliya I and Tudhaliya II, Freu (2007) has Kantuzzili—his son Tudhaliya I—his son Hattusili II—his son Tudhaliya II (p. 311).)	Nikkalmati (Note: Bryce (1997), p. 139.)
Arnuwanda I	Asmunikal
Hattusili II? (Note: The existence of Hattusili II is doubted by many scholars (Bryce 1997, pp. 153–154; Bryce 2005, p. 141). Among those who accept the existence of Hattusili II, Freu (2007), p. 311, has Tudhaliya I—his son Hattusili II—his son Tudhaliya II.)	Tudhaliya III (Note: Bryce (1997), p. 158.)	Daduhepa (Note: Bryce (1997), p. 172.)	Zida (Note: Bryce (1997), p. 174.)
Tudhaliya the Younger (Note: Bryce (1997), p. 168.)	Henti (1)	Šuppiluliuma I	(2) Tawananna (Note: Also known as Malnigal; daughter of Burnaburias II of Babylonia (Bryce 1997, p. 173).)
Arnuwanda II	Telipinu (Note: ‘Great priest’ in Kizzuwadna and king (lugal) of Aleppo (Bryce 1997, p. 174).)	Sarri-Kusuh (Note: King (lugal) of Carchemish.) (Note: Bryce (1997), pp. 174, 203–204.)	Zannanza (Note: Zannanza died on his way to Egypt to marry a pharaoh's widow, probably Ankhesenpaaten, the widow of Tutankhamun (Bryce 1997, pp. 196–198).)	Gassulawiya (Note: Bryce (1997), p. 227.) (1)	Mursili II	(2) Tanuhepa (Note: Bryce (1997), p. 230.)
Talmi-Sarruma (Note: Bryce (1997), p. 220.)	Sahurunuwa (Note: Bryce (1997), p. 222.)	Muwatalli II	Halpasulupi (Note: Haas (2006), p. 91.)	Massanauzzi (Note: Massanauzzi married Masturi, king of the Seha River Land (Bryce 1997, p. 313).)	Hattusili III (Note: Bryce (1997), p. 296.)	Puduhepa (Note: Puduhepa was the daughter of the Kizzuwadnan priest Pentipsarri (Bryce 1997, p. 273).)
Ini-Tesub (Note: Bryce (1997), pp. 346, 363.)	Urhi-Tesub	Kurunta (Note: King (lugal) of Tarhuntassa (Bryce 1997, p. 296); apparently later Great King of Hatti (Bryce 1997, p. 354).)	Nerikkaili (Note: Nerikkaili married a daughter of Bentesina, king of Amurru (Bryce 1997, p. 294).)	numerous daughters (Note: Two daughters of Hattusili III were married to the pharaoh Ramesses II; one was given the Egyptian name Ma(hor)nefrure. Another, Gassuwaliya, married into the royal house of Amurru. Kilushepa was married to a king of Isuwa. A daughter married into the royal family of Babylon. A sister of Tudhaliya IV married Sausgamuwa, king of Amurru after his father Bentesina. From Bryce (1997), pp. 294 and 312.) and sons (Note: Bryce (1997), p. 332.)	Tudhaliya IV (Note: Bryce (1997), p. 363. Tudhaliya IV probably married a Babylonian princess, known by her title of Great Princess (dumu.sal gal) (Bryce 1997, pp. 294, 331).)
Talmi-Tesub (Note: Bryce (1997), p. 363.)	Arnuwanda III (Note: Bryce (1997), p. 361.)	Suppiluliuma II (Note: Last documented Great King of the Land of Hatti.)
Kuzi-Tesub (Note: King and then Great King of Carchemish (Bryce 1997, pp. 384–385).)

- (1) = 1st spouse
- (2) = 2nd spouse
- Small caps indicates a Great King (LUGAL.GAL) of the Land of Hatti; italic small caps indicates a Great Queen or Tawananna.
- Dashed lines indicate adoption.
- Solid lines indicate marriage (if horizontal) or parentage (if vertical).

References:
- Trevor Bryce (1997). The Kingdom of the Hittites. Oxford, England: Clarendon Press.
- Trevor Bryce (2005). The Kingdom of the Hittites (new edition). Oxford, England: Clarendon Press.
- Trevor Bryce (2012). The World of the Neo-Hittite Kingdoms. Oxford, England: Oxford University Press.
- Jacques Freu (2007). Les débuts du nouvel empire hittite. Paris, France: L'Harmattan.
- Volkert Haas (2006). Die hethitische Literatur. Berlin, Germany: de Gruyter.
Notes:

Preceded by -	King of Carchemish ca. 1315 BC	Succeeded by...sarruma
