= Arnuwanda II =

King of the Hittite empire

Arnuwanda I
- King of the Hittites
- Reign: c. 1322 BC–c. 1321 BC
- Predecessor: Šuppiluliuma I
- Successor: Muršili II
- Father: Šuppiluliuma I
- Mother: Ḫenti

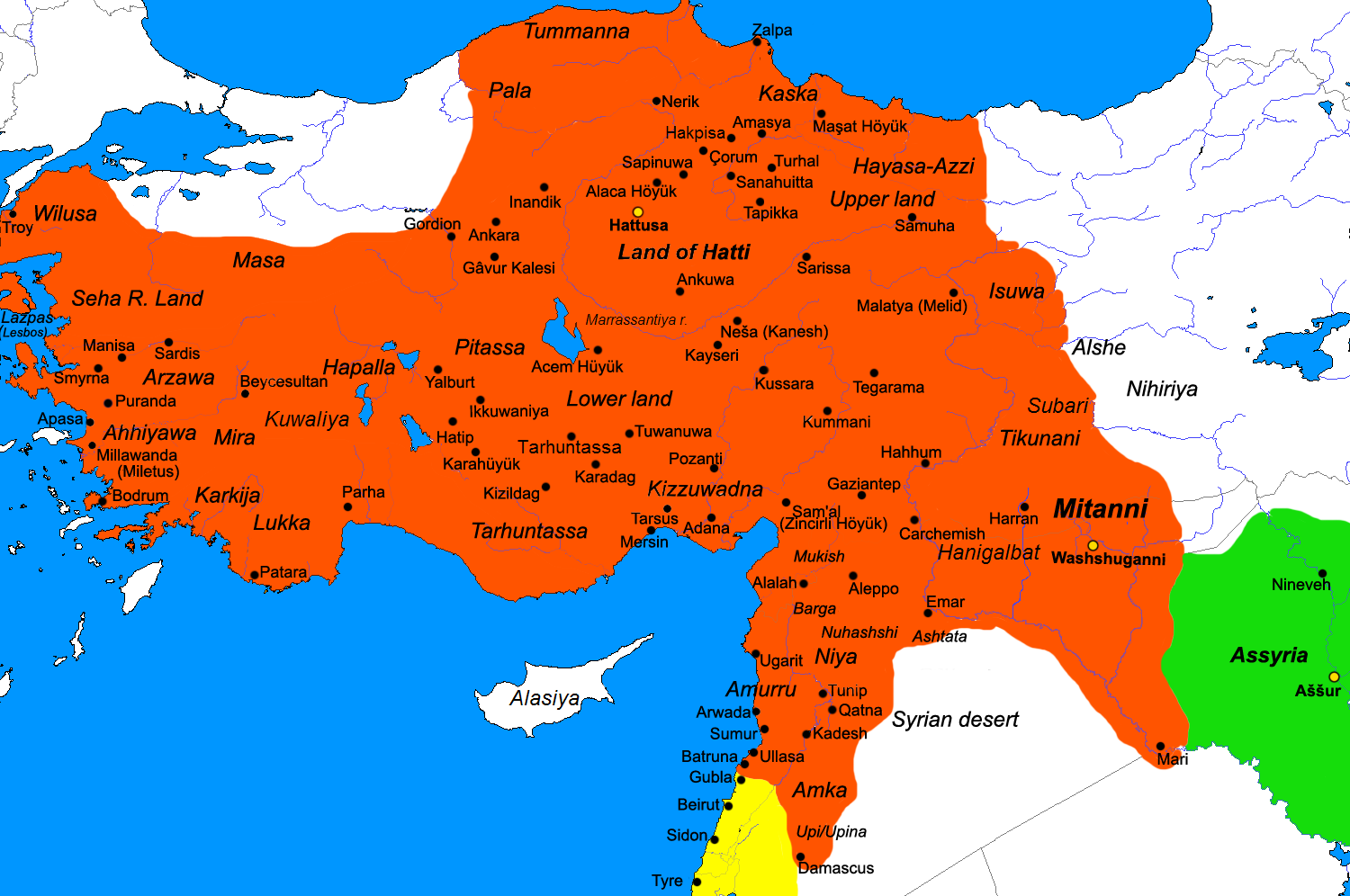
Map of the Hittite Empire at its greatest extent under Suppiluliuma I(c.1350–1322) and Mursili II (c.1321–1295). Because many of the place names have been taken from Hittite sources and compared to classical place names, they may not all be correct as there is still scholarly disagreement (ex. Lukka as Lycia, Karkija as Caria).

Arnuwanda II was a Hittite king who reigned in the late 14th century BC, perhaps in c. 1322–1321 BC. His reign was a brief interlude between those of his father Šuppiluliuma I and younger brother Muršili II.

== Early life ==
Arnuwanda was the eldest surviving son of the Hittite great king Šuppiluliuma I and his first wife, Ḫenti, herself apparently the daughter of Tudḫaliya III (sometimes called Tudḫaliya II) and granddaughter of Arnuwanda I.

=== Crown Prince ===
Arnuwanda was declared his father's heir apparent (tuḫkanti) and is attested as such in references to several events taking place during Šuppiluliuma's reign. Arnuwanda's absence from the record in the earliest events of his father's reign suggests he was too young to participate in them at the time. Together with his father, mother, and uncle Zida, Arnuwanda was mentioned in the description of the formal installation of his younger brother Telipinu as priest (and governor) of Kizzuwatna.

=== The Great Syrian Wars ===
By the time of the Six-Year War against Tushratta of the Mittanians, Arnuwanda was ready for military command. When the Mittanians defeated a Hittite contingent in northern Syria, Šuppiluliuma dispatched against them advance forces under Arnuwanda and his uncle Zida; they chased off the enemy, allowing Šuppiluliuma to undertake the ultimately successful siege of Carchemish. Following the murder of Arnuwanda’s younger brother Zannanza en route to become king of Egypt, Šuppiluluma sent Arnuwanda to raid and pillage the Egyptian possessions in southern Syria. Arnuwanda met with success, but the large number of captives that he brought back with him carried with them plague, which would ravage Hittite society for at least two decades, according to the Plague Prayers of Arnuwanda’s brother and eventual successor Muršili II.

== Reign ==
In 1322 BC, Arnuwanda II seems to have succeeded his father Šuppiluliuma I on the Hittite throne without incident, having long been the recognized heir apparent, and having been entrusted with military command in the conflicts with Mittani and Egypt. Because his stepmother, the Babylonian Tawananna (Malnigal?), was still alive when Arnuwanda became king, she continued to occupy the position of chief queen throughout his brief reign and into that of his successor. Once king, Arnuwanda was forced to attend to the Kaška threat on northern frontier, which had preoccupied Šuppiluliuma's last years. Apparently already ill, Arnuwanda seems to have intended conferring that command to his father's veteran general Ḫannutti, but the latter died soon after meeting with the king. Fragmentary texts suggest Arnuwanda renewed the treaties of vassalage that his father had concluded with his younger brothers, particularly Piyaššili (Šarri-Kušuḫ) of Carchemish. Like his father Šuppiluliuma and his younger brother Muršili II, Arnuwanda seems to have interceded on behalf of the exiled ruler of the Šeḫa River Land Manapa-Tarḫunta with his hosts in Karkiša; later, Muršili would restore Manapa-Tarḫunta to his throne as a vassal king, and forgive him a subsequent rebellion.

Most modern scholars assume, from the contemporary attestation of plague and the premature death of Arnuwanda, that both Šuppiluliuma and Arnuwanda contracted the disease and succumbed to it. It is uncertain whether Arnuwanda left any children, but at any rate he was succeeded by his younger brother Muršili II.

== Family Tree ==
Hittite New Kingdom royal family tree according to Trevor Bryce

Kantuzilli (Note: Scholars have suggested that Tudhaliya I/II was possibly a grandson of the Hittite king Huzziya II; the first Tudhaliya is now known to be the son of Kantuzzili (Bryce 1997, p. 131 suggested Himuili, but the new edition, Bryce 2005, p. 122, indicated Kantuzzili).)
Tudhaliya I/II (Note: Bryce (1997) does not consider it clear whether Tudhaliya I/II was one king or two (p. 133); the link points to Tudhaliya II. Among those who identify distinct kings Tudhaliya I and Tudhaliya II, Freu (2007) has Kantuzzili—his son Tudhaliya I—his son Hattusili II—his son Tudhaliya II (p. 311).) | Nikkalmati (Note: Bryce (1997), p. 139.)
Arnuwanda I | Asmunikal
Hattusili II? (Note: The existence of Hattusili II is doubted by many scholars (Bryce 1997, pp. 153–154; Bryce 2005, p. 141). Among those who accept the existence of Hattusili II, Freu (2007), p. 311, has Tudhaliya I—his son Hattusili II—his son Tudhaliya II.) | Tudhaliya III (Note: Bryce (1997), p. 158.) | Daduhepa (Note: Bryce (1997), p. 172.) | Zida (Note: Bryce (1997), p. 174.)
Tudhaliya the Younger (Note: Bryce (1997), p. 168.) | Henti (1) | Šuppiluliuma I | (2) Tawananna (Note: Also known as Malnigal; daughter of Burnaburias II of Babylonia (Bryce 1997, p. 173).)
Arnuwanda II | Telipinu (Note: ‘Great priest’ in Kizzuwadna and king (lugal) of Aleppo (Bryce 1997, p. 174).) | Sarri-Kusuh (Note: King (lugal) of Carchemish.) (Note: Bryce (1997), pp. 174, 203–204.) | Zannanza (Note: Zannanza died on his way to Egypt to marry a pharaoh's widow, probably Ankhesenpaaten, the widow of Tutankhamun (Bryce 1997, pp. 196–198).) | Gassulawiya (Note: Bryce (1997), p. 227.) (1) | Mursili II | (2) Tanuhepa (Note: Bryce (1997), p. 230.)
Talmi-Sarruma (Note: Bryce (1997), p. 220.) | Sahurunuwa (Note: Bryce (1997), p. 222.) | Muwatalli II | Halpasulupi (Note: Haas (2006), p. 91.) | Massanauzzi (Note: Massanauzzi married Masturi, king of the Seha River Land (Bryce 1997, p. 313).) | Hattusili III (Note: Bryce (1997), p. 296.) | Puduhepa (Note: Puduhepa was the daughter of the Kizzuwadnan priest Pentipsarri (Bryce 1997, p. 273).)
Ini-Tesub (Note: Bryce (1997), pp. 346, 363.) | Urhi-Tesub | Kurunta (Note: King (lugal) of Tarhuntassa (Bryce 1997, p. 296); apparently later Great King of Hatti (Bryce 1997, p. 354).) | Nerikkaili (Note: Nerikkaili married a daughter of Bentesina, king of Amurru (Bryce 1997, p. 294).) | numerous daughters (Note: Two daughters of Hattusili III were married to the pharaoh Ramesses II; one was given the Egyptian name Ma(hor)nefrure. Another, Gassuwaliya, married into the royal house of Amurru. Kilushepa was married to a king of Isuwa. A daughter married into the royal family of Babylon. A sister of Tudhaliya IV married Sausgamuwa, king of Amurru after his father Bentesina. From Bryce (1997), pp. 294 and 312.) and sons (Note: Bryce (1997), p. 332.) | Tudhaliya IV (Note: Bryce (1997), p. 363. Tudhaliya IV probably married a Babylonian princess, known by her title of Great Princess (dumu.sal gal) (Bryce 1997, pp. 294, 331).)
Talmi-Tesub (Note: Bryce (1997), p. 363.) | Arnuwanda III (Note: Bryce (1997), p. 361.) | Suppiluliuma II (Note: Last documented Great King of the Land of Hatti.)
Kuzi-Tesub (Note: King and then Great King of Carchemish (Bryce 1997, pp. 384–385).)

- (1) = 1st spouse
- (2) = 2nd spouse
- Small caps indicates a Great King (LUGAL.GAL) of the Land of Hatti; italic small caps indicates a Great Queen or Tawananna.
- Dashed lines indicate adoption.
- Solid lines indicate marriage (if horizontal) or parentage (if vertical).

References:
- Trevor Bryce (1997). The Kingdom of the Hittites. Oxford, England: Clarendon Press.
- Trevor Bryce (2005). The Kingdom of the Hittites (new edition). Oxford, England: Clarendon Press.
- Trevor Bryce (2012). The World of the Neo-Hittite Kingdoms. Oxford, England: Oxford University Press.
- Jacques Freu (2007). Les débuts du nouvel empire hittite. Paris, France: L'Harmattan.
- Volkert Haas (2006). Die hethitische Literatur. Berlin, Germany: de Gruyter.

== In fiction ==
- Janet Morris wrote a detailed biographical novel, I, the Sun, whose subject was Suppiluliuma I. Arnuwanda II is an important figure in this novel, in which all characters are from the historical record, which Dr. Jerry Pournelle called "a masterpiece of historical fiction" and about which O.M. Gurney, Hittite scholar and author of The Hittites, commented that "the author is familiar with every aspect of Hittite culture". Morris' book was republished by The Perseid Press in April 2013.
- He is also a character in Chie Shinohara's historical manga Red River or Anatolia Story. In this manga he is a frail-bodied man who appoints Yuri's boyfriend, his half-brother Mursili, as his successor. He is later murdered in very shady circumstances, and Yuri is falsely accused of killing him but her maid Ursula claims that she's the true murderer and is executed. The culprit isn't found until much later.
- Arnuwanda II also appears in the Historical novel, "Amarna Book I: Book of Ida" by Grea Alexander. In it, he is pitted against his brother, Mursili II, who is protecting Queen Ankhesenamun's emissary, Idaten, following the murder of their brother Prince Zannanza. This book was published by SeaMonkey Ink, LLC in 2012 and is the first of a three part trilogy.

== See also ==
- History of the Hittites
- Hittite plague

== Bibliography ==
- Beckman, Gary (1996), Hittite Diplomatic Texts, Atlanta.
- Beckman, Gary (1997), "Plague Prayers of Muršili II (I.60)," in William H. Hallo and K. Lawson Younger Jr., eds., The Context of Scripture, vol. 1, Leiden.
- Bilgin, Tayfun (2018), Official and Administration in the Hittite World, Berlin.
- Bryce, Trevor (2005), The Kingdom of the Hittites, Oxford.
- Freu, Jacques, and Michel Mazoyer (2007b), Les débuts du nouvel empire hittite, Paris.
- Freu, Jacques, and Michel Mazoyer (2008), L'apogée du nouvel empire hittite, Paris.
- Güterbock, Hans G. (1956), "The Deeds of Suppiluliuma as Told by His Son, Mursili II," Journal of Cuneiform Studies 10 (1956) 107-130.
- Klengel, Horst (1999), Geschichte des Hethitischen Reiches, Leiden.
- Kuhrt, Amélie (1995), The Ancient Near East c. 3000–330 BC, vol. 1., London.
- Stavi, Boaz (2011), "The Genealogy of Suppiluliuma I," Altorientalische Forschungen 38 (2011) 226–239. online
- Taracha, Piotr (2016), "Tudhaliya III's Queens, Šuppiluliuma's Accession and Related Issues," in Sedat Erkut and Özlem Sir Gavaz (eds.), Studies in Honour of Ahmet Ünal Armağanı, Istanbul: 489–498. online
- Weeden, Mark (2022), "The Hittite Empire," in Karen Radner et al. (eds.), The Oxford History of the Ancient Near East, vol. 3 (From the Hyksos to the Late Second Millennium BC), Oxford: 529-622.

Regnal titles
| Preceded by Šuppiluliuma I | Hittite king c. 1322–c. 1321 BC | Succeeded by Muršili II |
