= Ḫattušili II =

1400s BC king of the Hittite Empire

Hattusili II

Possible King of Hittite
- Reign: c. 1440 – c. 1425 BC

Ḫattušili II (Hittite: "[man] from Hattusa") was a possible Hittite great king during the 15th or 14th century BC, perhaps reigning c. 1440–c. 1425 BC.

== Evidence ==
The existence of a king named Ḫattušili in this period of Hittite history is disputed among scholars, and considered unlikely by many. Identification of such a king relies primarily on the historical introduction to the treaty between the Hittite great king Muršili II and his nephew Talmi-Šarruma, the king of Aleppo. Following references to the Hittite kings Ḫattušili I defeating, and Mursili I and Tudḫaliya I destroying Aleppo, and preceding a reference to the intervention of the Hittite king Šuppiluliuma I, the relevant passage reads:

The king of Aleppo committed an offense [against] the king of Ḫanigalbat, but he also committed an offense against Ḫattušili, [King] of Ḫatti.
The people of Aštata and the people of Nuḫašši requested [cities] and border districts of the land of Aleppo [from] the king of Mittanni.
And the king of Mittanni [came] and gave [these] cities and border districts [to the people] of Aštata and the people of Nuḫašši [as] a benefaction for the sake of friendly relations.
And he wrote tablets for them <concerning> [these] cities and concerning these border districts, and he sealed them with his seal. The people of Aleppo thus committed an offense against Ḫattušili, [King] of Ḫatti.
[When the people of Aštata] and [the people of] Nuḫašši [came] to Ḫattušili, King of Ḫatti, they requested the cities [and] the border districts of the land of Aleppo, [and the king of Ḫatti] came, and he gave the cities and the border districts of the land of Aleppo [… to the people of Aštata] and the people of Nuḫašši as a benefaction. [He wrote tablets concerning these cities and border districts] and he sealed them [with] his seal. They still have them in their possession.

Additionally, Onofrio Carruba and Jacques Freu consider a Middle Hittite text fragment (KUB XXXVI 109), to be attributable to this Ḫattušili with certainty and believe it to relate the appointment of Ḫattušili as heir apparent (tuḫkanti). It reads, in part:

Now see: [Ḫattušili], who among the king’s sons was called to the kingship, may his brothers, his sisters, his [kinsmen], and all the population of Ḫattuša recognize him and, as king, show him respect. And if anyone among his brothers or sisters does not show him respect, let him veil his head from Ḫattušili. May he who is his enemy be banished!

== Interpretation ==
Michael Astour, who devised an extreme compression of the generations of Hittite monarchs, dismissed Ḫattušili II as "the most phantomatic" "of all the dubious Hittite kings." Astour provides a useful overview of the various attempts at placing Ḫattušili II within the chronological and genealogical sequence of Hittite kings up to 1989, concluding that he "is an extraordinarily elusive character" and should be discarded. While many of Astour’s conclusions are not accepted, this, and his identification of Tudḫaliya I and Tudḫaliya II as a single king, have remained very influential in historiography.

Reading the historical introduction to the treaty between Muršili II and Talmi-Šarruma at face value, it would confirm the existence of a Ḫattušili II, reigning sometime between Tudḫaliya I and Šuppiluliuma I. However, it has been argued that the reference to the interactions between this Ḫattušili and Aleppo in the text is in a non-chronological position, and functions as a flashback to Ḫattušili I, who defeated Aleppo in the early 16th century BC. The demonstration that there are references to Ḫanigalbat, Aštata, and Nuḫḫaši sufficiently early to allow the geopolitical context described in the treaty to date to the time of Ḫattušili I, is offset by the apparent natural flow of the narrative and the incompatibility between the roles of the ostensibly two Ḫattušilis in it.

Possibly extraneous concerns have also influenced the acceptance or rejection of Ḫattušili II: his least problematic placement separates Tudḫaliya I from Tudḫaliya II, whom many scholars identify with each other, or, assuming a single Tudḫaliya I/II, it is difficult to find place for a Ḫattušili II after him, given the apparently immediate and uninterrupted succession of subsequent kings. The placement of Ḫattušili II, if he existed, has also been bedeviled by the debate of whether he should be identified as a great-grandfather (father of Šuppiluliuma I) or more distant ancestor in the genealogy of Ḫattušili III, or not at all. Astour cited the discovery of seal impressions naming Šuppiluliuma I as the son of Tudḫaliya III as final proof of the non-existence of Ḫattušili II, but this would only preclude the insertion of Ḫattušili II at this specific point in the chronological and genealogical sequence of monarchs. Moreover, recent studies indicate that Šuppiluliuma was actually the son-in-law and perhaps adopted son of Tudḫaliya III, although that does not necessarily have any bearing on the existence and placement of Ḫattušili II.

The seeming absence of Ḫattušili II from the surviving lists of offerings to Hittite royals, has been addressed by Carruba and Freu, who not only note the jumbled and non-comprehensive nature of the lists, but also the possibility that Ḫattušili II might appear in them under a Hurrian name, PU-Šarruma, as the son of a Tudḫaliya. The Middle Hittite character of the text apparently relating the appointment of a Ḫattušili as heir to the throne, is likewise considered suggestive for the existence of Ḫattušili II.

== Possible reign ==
Assuming and defending the existence of Ḫattušili II, Freu places him as the son of Tudḫaliya I and father of Tudḫaliya II. Given the scarcity of evidence and the reference to Tudḫaliya II succeeding to his father’s throne at an early age, Freu posits a short reign, which he defines approximately as 1440–1425 BC. This reign corresponded to a recession in the Egyptian involvement in northern Syria, allowing for Ḫattušili II’s intervention in the affairs of Aleppo, Aštata, and Nuḫḫaši, and possibly amicable relations with Egypt.

In terms of family relations, Freu suggests that Ḫattušili II was the son of Tudḫaliya I by possibly Kattešḫapi, the husband of a queen named Ašmu-Ḫeba, and the father of Tudḫaliya II and his sister Ziplantawiya.

Hittite New Kingdom royal family tree according to Trevor Bryce

Kantuzilli (Note: Scholars have suggested that Tudhaliya I/II was possibly a grandson of the Hittite king Huzziya II; the first Tudhaliya is now known to be the son of Kantuzzili (Bryce 1997, p. 131 suggested Himuili, but the new edition, Bryce 2005, p. 122, indicated Kantuzzili).)
Tudhaliya I/II (Note: Bryce (1997) does not consider it clear whether Tudhaliya I/II was one king or two (p. 133); the link points to Tudhaliya II. Among those who identify distinct kings Tudhaliya I and Tudhaliya II, Freu (2007) has Kantuzzili—his son Tudhaliya I—his son Hattusili II—his son Tudhaliya II (p. 311).)	Nikkalmati (Note: Bryce (1997), p. 139.)
Arnuwanda I	Asmunikal
Hattusili II? (Note: The existence of Hattusili II is doubted by many scholars (Bryce 1997, pp. 153–154; Bryce 2005, p. 141). Among those who accept the existence of Hattusili II, Freu (2007), p. 311, has Tudhaliya I—his son Hattusili II—his son Tudhaliya II.)	Tudhaliya III (Note: Bryce (1997), p. 158.)	Daduhepa (Note: Bryce (1997), p. 172.)	Zida (Note: Bryce (1997), p. 174.)
Tudhaliya the Younger (Note: Bryce (1997), p. 168.)	Henti (1)	Šuppiluliuma I	(2) Tawananna (Note: Also known as Malnigal; daughter of Burnaburias II of Babylonia (Bryce 1997, p. 173).)
Arnuwanda II	Telipinu (Note: ‘Great priest’ in Kizzuwadna and king (lugal) of Aleppo (Bryce 1997, p. 174).)	Sarri-Kusuh (Note: King (lugal) of Carchemish.) (Note: Bryce (1997), pp. 174, 203–204.)	Zannanza (Note: Zannanza died on his way to Egypt to marry a pharaoh's widow, probably Ankhesenpaaten, the widow of Tutankhamun (Bryce 1997, pp. 196–198).)	Gassulawiya (Note: Bryce (1997), p. 227.) (1)	Mursili II	(2) Tanuhepa (Note: Bryce (1997), p. 230.)
Talmi-Sarruma (Note: Bryce (1997), p. 220.)	Sahurunuwa (Note: Bryce (1997), p. 222.)	Muwatalli II	Halpasulupi (Note: Haas (2006), p. 91.)	Massanauzzi (Note: Massanauzzi married Masturi, king of the Seha River Land (Bryce 1997, p. 313).)	Hattusili III (Note: Bryce (1997), p. 296.)	Puduhepa (Note: Puduhepa was the daughter of the Kizzuwadnan priest Pentipsarri (Bryce 1997, p. 273).)
Ini-Tesub (Note: Bryce (1997), pp. 346, 363.)	Urhi-Tesub	Kurunta (Note: King (lugal) of Tarhuntassa (Bryce 1997, p. 296); apparently later Great King of Hatti (Bryce 1997, p. 354).)	Nerikkaili (Note: Nerikkaili married a daughter of Bentesina, king of Amurru (Bryce 1997, p. 294).)	numerous daughters (Note: Two daughters of Hattusili III were married to the pharaoh Ramesses II; one was given the Egyptian name Ma(hor)nefrure. Another, Gassuwaliya, married into the royal house of Amurru. Kilushepa was married to a king of Isuwa. A daughter married into the royal family of Babylon. A sister of Tudhaliya IV married Sausgamuwa, king of Amurru after his father Bentesina. From Bryce (1997), pp. 294 and 312.) and sons (Note: Bryce (1997), p. 332.)	Tudhaliya IV (Note: Bryce (1997), p. 363. Tudhaliya IV probably married a Babylonian princess, known by her title of Great Princess (dumu.sal gal) (Bryce 1997, pp. 294, 331).)
Talmi-Tesub (Note: Bryce (1997), p. 363.)	Arnuwanda III (Note: Bryce (1997), p. 361.)	Suppiluliuma II (Note: Last documented Great King of the Land of Hatti.)
Kuzi-Tesub (Note: King and then Great King of Carchemish (Bryce 1997, pp. 384–385).)

- (1) = 1st spouse
- (2) = 2nd spouse
- Small caps indicates a Great King (LUGAL.GAL) of the Land of Hatti; italic small caps indicates a Great Queen or Tawananna.
- Dashed lines indicate adoption.
- Solid lines indicate marriage (if horizontal) or parentage (if vertical).

References:
- Trevor Bryce (1997). The Kingdom of the Hittites. Oxford, England: Clarendon Press.
- Trevor Bryce (2005). The Kingdom of the Hittites (new edition). Oxford, England: Clarendon Press.
- Trevor Bryce (2012). The World of the Neo-Hittite Kingdoms. Oxford, England: Oxford University Press.
- Jacques Freu (2007). Les débuts du nouvel empire hittite. Paris, France: L'Harmattan.
- Volkert Haas (2006). Die hethitische Literatur. Berlin, Germany: de Gruyter.
Notes:

Hittite New Kingdom royal family tree according to Jacques Freu
- Kantuzzili, (Note: Freu & Mazoyer 2007b: 24, 34, 45.) m. Walanni, perhaps daughter of Zidanta II (Note: Freu & Mazoyer 2007b: 24.)
  - TUDḪALIYA I (c.1465–1440 BC), (Note: Freu & Mazoyer 2007b: 24, 34, 45.) m. Kattešḫapi (?) (Note: Freu & Mazoyer 2007b: 63-68.)
    - ḪATTUŠILI II (c.1440–1425 BC), (Note: Freu & Mazoyer 2007b: 68.) m. Ašmu-Ḫeba (?) (Note: Freu & Mazoyer 2007b: 97.)
      - TUDḪALIYA II (c.1425–1390 BC), (Note: Freu & Mazoyer 2007b: 76.) m. Nikkal-mati (Note: Freu & Mazoyer 2007b: 96.)
        - Ašmu-Nikkal, (Note: Freu & Mazoyer 2007b: 96-99.) m. ARNUWANDA I (c.1390–1370 BC) (Note: Freu & Mazoyer 2007b: 96-99.)
          - TUDḪALIYA III/Tašmi-Šarri (c.1370–1350 BC), (Note: Freu & Mazoyer 2007b: 155.) m. (1) Šatandu-Ḫeba; (=?) (2) Tadu-Ḫeba (Note: Freu & Mazoyer 2007b: 161-162, considering the two names variants, referring to the same queen.)
            - Tulpi-Teššub the Younger (Note: Freu & Mazoyer 2007b: 155-156, additionally suggesting to identify him with Tudḫaliya the Younger.)
            - Tudḫaliya the Younger d.c.1350 BC (Note: Freu & Mazoyer 2007b: 199-200.)
            - Ḫenti, (Note: Freu & Mazoyer 2007b: 199-201.) m. ŠUPPILULIUMA I (c.1350–1319 BC), (Note: Freu & Mazoyer 2007b: 198-201.) who m. (2) Tawananna (Malnigal) of Babylon (Note: Freu & Mazoyer 2007b: 257.)
              - ARNUWANDA II (c.1319–1318 BC) (Note: Freu & Mazoyer 2007b: 211.)
              - Telipinu, Priest of Kizzuwatna, then vassal king of Aleppo, left descendants (Note: Freu & Mazoyer 2007b: 211, 273, 276.)
              - Piyaššili/Šarri-Kušuḫ, vassal king of Carchemish, left descendants (Note: Freu & Mazoyer 2007b: 275.)
              - Zannanza, (Note: Freu & Mazoyer 2007b: 278, 284.) betrothed to Ankhesenamun (?) (Note: Freu & Mazoyer 2007b: 284.)
              - MURŠILI II (c.1318–1295 BC), (Note: Freu & Mazoyer 2008: 19.) m. (1) Gaššulawiya; (Note: Freu & Mazoyer 2008: 62-65.) (2) Danu-Ḫeba (Note: Freu & Mazoyer 2008: 65-67.)
                - Ḫalpašulupi (Note: Freu & Mazoyer 2008: 87.)
                - MUWATALLI II (c.1295–1272 BC) (Note: Freu & Mazoyer 2008: 87.)
                  - MURŠILI III/Urḫi-Teššub (c.1272–1265 BC) (Note: Freu & Mazoyer 2008: 128-129, 153.)
                  - Kurunta/Ulmi-Teššub, vassal king of Tarḫuntašša, left descendants (Note: Freu & Mazoyer 2008: 165-169.)
                - Maššanauzzi, (Note: Freu & Mazoyer 2008: 87.) m. King Mašturi of the Šeḫa River Land (Note: Freu & Mazoyer 2008: 130, 222.)
                - ḪATTUŠILI III (c.1265–1240 BC), (Note: Freu & Mazoyer 2008: 87, 163.) m. Pudu-Ḫeba (Note: Freu & Mazoyer 2008: 149-150.)
                  - Nerikkaili, (Note: Freu & Mazoyer 2008: 164, 201.) m. daughter of King Bentešina of Amurru (Note: Freu & Mazoyer 2010: 65.)
                  - Ḫuzziya (Note: Freu & Mazoyer 2008: 165, 201-203.)
                  - TUDḪALIYA IV/Tašmi-Šarruma (c.1240–1215 BC) (Note: Freu & Mazoyer 2008: 166, 201; Freu & Mazoyer 2010: 20-21, rejecting the alternative reading "Ḫišmi-Šarruma.")
                    - ARNUWANDA III (c.1215–1210 BC) (Note: Freu & Mazoyer 2010: 177-178.)
                    - ŠUPPILULIUMA II (c.1210–1185 BC) (Note: Freu & Mazoyer 2010: 178-180.)
                      - TUDḪALIYA V (?) (Note: Freu 2010–2011: 190-191.)
                      - Eḫli-Nikkal, m. King Ammurapi of Ugarit (Note: Freu 2010: 189.)
                  - Ḫannuti (Note: Freu & Mazoyer 2008: 166, 201-202.)
                  - Ḫešni (Note: Freu & Mazoyer 2008: 166, 201, 203-204.)
                  - Kurakura (Note: Freu & Mazoyer 2010: 66.)
                  - Ḫišmi-Šarruma (Note: Freu & Mazoyer 2010: 67-68.)
                  - Maathorneferure, (Note: Freu & Mazoyer 2008: 166, 239.) m. King Ramesses II of Egypt (Note: Freu & Mazoyer 2008: 166, 239.)
                  - Unknown, m. King Ramesses II of Egypt (Note: Freu & Mazoyer 2008: 166, 240-241.)
                  - Gaššulawiya, (Note: Freu & Mazoyer 2008: 166, 210.) m. King Bentešina of Amurru (Note: Freu & Mazoyer 2008: 166, 210.)
                  - Kiluš-Ḫeba, (Note: Freu & Mazoyer 2008: 166.) m. King Ari-Šarruma of Išuwa (Note: Freu & Mazoyer 2008: 166; Freu & Mazoyer 2010: 67.)
              - Muwatti, m. King Mašḫuiluwa of Mira-Kuwaliya (Note: Freu & Mazoyer 2008: 69.)
              - Unknown, m. King Šattiwaza of Mittani (Note: Freu & Mazoyer 2007b: 289.)
          - Kantuzzili, Priest of Kizzuwatna (Note: Freu & Mazoyer 2007b: 148-149.)
          - Pariyawatra (Note: Freu & Mazoyer 2007b: 148.)
          - Mannini (Note: Freu & Mazoyer 2007b: 148.)
          - Tulpi-Teššub (Note: Freu & Mazoyer 2007b: 148.)
          - Ašmi-Šarruma
      - Ziplantawiya, Queen, (Note: Freu & Mazoyer 2007b: 96-98.) m. Unknown
        - Attāi (Note: Freu & Mazoyer 2007b: 97.)

A detailed and annotated genealogy of Hittite New Kingdom monarchs and their families, as reconstructed by Jacques Freu in his multi-volume work Les Hittites et leur histoire, presented as an alternative to the less detailed and sometimes differing reconstruction based on Trevor Bryce, The Kingdom of the Hittites.

References:
- Freu, Jacques, and Michel Mazoyer (2007b), Les débuts du nouvel empire hittite, Paris.
- Freu, Jacques, and Michel Mazoyer (2008), L'apogée du nouvel empire hittite, Paris.
- Freu, Jacques, and Michel Mazoyer (2010), Le déclin et la chute du nouvel empire hittite, Paris.
- Freu, Jacques (2010–2011), "Le vase d'argent du musée des civilisations anatoliennes d'Ankara et la fin de l'empire hittite," Talanta 42–43 (2010–2011) 185-192.

== See also ==
- History of the Hittites

== Bibliography ==
- Astour, Michael C. (1972), "Ḫattušiliš, Ḫalab, and Ḫanigalbat," Journal of Near Eastern Studies 31 (1972) 102-109.
- Astour, Michael C. (1989), Hittite History and the Absolute Chronology of the Bronze Age, Partille.
- Beckman, Gary (1996), Hittite Diplomatic Texts, Atlanta.
- Beckman, Gary (2000), "Hittite Chronology," Akkadica 119-120 (2000) 19-32.
- Bryce, Trevor (2005), The Kingdom of the Hittites, Oxford.
- Carruba, Onofrio (2005), "Tuthalija 00I.* (und Hattusili II.)," Altorientalische Forschungen 32 (2005) 246-271.
- Freu, Jacques, and Michel Mazoyer (2007a), Des origins à la fin de l’ancien royaume hittite, Paris.
- Freu, Jacques, and Michel Mazoyer (2007b), Les débuts du nouvel empire hittite, Paris.
- Güterbock, Hans G. (1973), "Ḫattušili II Once More," Journal of Cuneiform Studies 25 (1973) 100-104.
- Klengel, Horst (1999), Geschichte des Hethitischen Reiches, Leiden.
- Kuhrt, Amélie (1995), The Ancient Near East c. 3000–330 BC, vol. 1., London.
- Stavi, Boaz (2011), "The Genealogy of Suppiluliuma I," Altorientalische Forschungen 38 (2011) 226–239. online
- Taracha, Piotr (2016), "Tudhaliya III's Queens, Šuppiluliuma's Accession and Related Issues," in Sedat Erkut and Özlem Sir Gavaz (eds.), Studies in Honour of Ahmet Ünal Armağanı, Istanbul: 489–498. online
- Weeden, Mark (2022), "The Hittite Empire," in Karen Radner et al. (eds.), The Oxford History of the Ancient Near East, vol. 3 (From the * Hyksos to the Late Second Millennium BC), Oxford: 529-622.
- Wilhelm, Gernot (2004), "Generation Count in Hittite Chronology," in Herman Hunger and Regine Pruzsinszky, eds., Mesopotamian Dark Age Revisited, Vienna, 71-79.

Regnal titles
Preceded by	Possible King of Hittite c. 1440 – c. 1425 BC	Succeeded by
