= Henti =

Queen consort of Hittite
- Tenure: c. 1335 BC
- King: Suppiluliuma I
- Spouse: Suppiluliuma I
- Father: Tudhaliya III

Ḫenti (or Ḫinti; fl. c. 1335 BC) was a Hittite queen, the first wife of king Šuppiluliuma I.

== Biography ==
Ḫenti is described on her seal as the "great queen, daughter of the great king, the hero," making her the daughter of the great king Tudḫaliya III (sometimes called Tudḫaliya II). Šuppiluliuma I, long considered the son of his predecessor, was therefore his son-in-law and possibly adopted son. Šuppiluliuma I, long closely associated with Tudḫaliya III, seized the throne by eliminating Tudḫaliya's possibly underage son and heir, Tudḫaliya the Younger, who would have been a brother or half-brother of Ḫenti.

At the very beginning of Šuppiluliuma I's reign the title of Tawananna was retained by Dadu-Ḫeba, his mother-in-law, the widow of Tudḫaliya III and possibly mother of Tudḫaliya the Younger and perhaps Ḫenti. Following the death of Dadu-Ḫeba, the title of Tawananna passed to Ḫenti, and she is attested by this title in the text of the decree appointing her son Telipinu priest in Kizzuwatna. Ḫenti's tenure as Tawananna is sometimes said to have been relatively short, as the title was next assumed by Šuppiluliuma's Babylonian wife, known simply as Tawananna (her personal name was perhaps Malnigal). In fact, there are relatively numerous attestations of Šuppiluliuma I and Ḫenti as the royal couple on seals, and Ḫenti might have lasted as Tawananna for a good while, Šuppiluliuma I perhaps marrying his Babylonian wife later in his reign.

A fragmentary text from the reign of Ḫenti's son Muršili II makes reference to his father, mother, and a banishment of someone to the land of Aḫḫiyawa. A common interpretation of the text is that it was Ḫenti who was banished into exile. If it was her, the reasons for her exile are unclear, although one possibility is the desirability of a marriage alliance with the Kassite king of Babylon (probably Burna-Buriash II), or conflict between Ḫenti and Šuppiluliuma's new Babylonian wife.

Henti is believed to have been the mother of Šuppiluliuma I's sons Arnuwanda II, Telipinu, Piyaššili, Muršili II, and Zannanza.

== In fiction ==
Queen Henti is a character in the historical fiction manga Red River.

Hittite New Kingdom royal family tree according to Trevor Bryce

Kantuzilli (Note: Scholars have suggested that Tudhaliya I/II was possibly a grandson of the Hittite king Huzziya II; the first Tudhaliya is now known to be the son of Kantuzzili (Bryce 1997, p. 131 suggested Himuili, but the new edition, Bryce 2005, p. 122, indicated Kantuzzili).)
Tudhaliya I/II (Note: Bryce (1997) does not consider it clear whether Tudhaliya I/II was one king or two (p. 133); the link points to Tudhaliya II. Among those who identify distinct kings Tudhaliya I and Tudhaliya II, Freu (2007) has Kantuzzili—his son Tudhaliya I—his son Hattusili II—his son Tudhaliya II (p. 311).)	Nikkalmati (Note: Bryce (1997), p. 139.)
Arnuwanda I	Asmunikal
Hattusili II? (Note: The existence of Hattusili II is doubted by many scholars (Bryce 1997, pp. 153–154; Bryce 2005, p. 141). Among those who accept the existence of Hattusili II, Freu (2007), p. 311, has Tudhaliya I—his son Hattusili II—his son Tudhaliya II.)	Tudhaliya III (Note: Bryce (1997), p. 158.)	Daduhepa (Note: Bryce (1997), p. 172.)	Zida (Note: Bryce (1997), p. 174.)
Tudhaliya the Younger (Note: Bryce (1997), p. 168.)	Henti (1)	Šuppiluliuma I	(2) Tawananna (Note: Also known as Malnigal; daughter of Burnaburias II of Babylonia (Bryce 1997, p. 173).)
Arnuwanda II	Telipinu (Note: ‘Great priest’ in Kizzuwadna and king (lugal) of Aleppo (Bryce 1997, p. 174).)	Sarri-Kusuh (Note: King (lugal) of Carchemish.) (Note: Bryce (1997), pp. 174, 203–204.)	Zannanza (Note: Zannanza died on his way to Egypt to marry a pharaoh's widow, probably Ankhesenpaaten, the widow of Tutankhamun (Bryce 1997, pp. 196–198).)	Gassulawiya (Note: Bryce (1997), p. 227.) (1)	Mursili II	(2) Tanuhepa (Note: Bryce (1997), p. 230.)
Talmi-Sarruma (Note: Bryce (1997), p. 220.)	Sahurunuwa (Note: Bryce (1997), p. 222.)	Muwatalli II	Halpasulupi (Note: Haas (2006), p. 91.)	Massanauzzi (Note: Massanauzzi married Masturi, king of the Seha River Land (Bryce 1997, p. 313).)	Hattusili III (Note: Bryce (1997), p. 296.)	Puduhepa (Note: Puduhepa was the daughter of the Kizzuwadnan priest Pentipsarri (Bryce 1997, p. 273).)
Ini-Tesub (Note: Bryce (1997), pp. 346, 363.)	Urhi-Tesub	Kurunta (Note: King (lugal) of Tarhuntassa (Bryce 1997, p. 296); apparently later Great King of Hatti (Bryce 1997, p. 354).)	Nerikkaili (Note: Nerikkaili married a daughter of Bentesina, king of Amurru (Bryce 1997, p. 294).)	numerous daughters (Note: Two daughters of Hattusili III were married to the pharaoh Ramesses II; one was given the Egyptian name Ma(hor)nefrure. Another, Gassuwaliya, married into the royal house of Amurru. Kilushepa was married to a king of Isuwa. A daughter married into the royal family of Babylon. A sister of Tudhaliya IV married Sausgamuwa, king of Amurru after his father Bentesina. From Bryce (1997), pp. 294 and 312.) and sons (Note: Bryce (1997), p. 332.)	Tudhaliya IV (Note: Bryce (1997), p. 363. Tudhaliya IV probably married a Babylonian princess, known by her title of Great Princess (dumu.sal gal) (Bryce 1997, pp. 294, 331).)
Talmi-Tesub (Note: Bryce (1997), p. 363.)	Arnuwanda III (Note: Bryce (1997), p. 361.)	Suppiluliuma II (Note: Last documented Great King of the Land of Hatti.)
Kuzi-Tesub (Note: King and then Great King of Carchemish (Bryce 1997, pp. 384–385).)

- (1) = 1st spouse
- (2) = 2nd spouse
- Small caps indicates a Great King (LUGAL.GAL) of the Land of Hatti; italic small caps indicates a Great Queen or Tawananna.
- Dashed lines indicate adoption.
- Solid lines indicate marriage (if horizontal) or parentage (if vertical).

References:
- Trevor Bryce (1997). The Kingdom of the Hittites. Oxford, England: Clarendon Press.
- Trevor Bryce (2005). The Kingdom of the Hittites (new edition). Oxford, England: Clarendon Press.
- Trevor Bryce (2012). The World of the Neo-Hittite Kingdoms. Oxford, England: Oxford University Press.
- Jacques Freu (2007). Les débuts du nouvel empire hittite. Paris, France: L'Harmattan.
- Volkert Haas (2006). Die hethitische Literatur. Berlin, Germany: de Gruyter.
Notes:

Hittite New Kingdom royal family tree according to Jacques Freu
- Kantuzzili, (Note: Freu & Mazoyer 2007b: 24, 34, 45.) m. Walanni, perhaps daughter of Zidanta II (Note: Freu & Mazoyer 2007b: 24.)
  - TUDḪALIYA I (c.1465–1440 BC), (Note: Freu & Mazoyer 2007b: 24, 34, 45.) m. Kattešḫapi (?) (Note: Freu & Mazoyer 2007b: 63-68.)
    - ḪATTUŠILI II (c.1440–1425 BC), (Note: Freu & Mazoyer 2007b: 68.) m. Ašmu-Ḫeba (?) (Note: Freu & Mazoyer 2007b: 97.)
      - TUDḪALIYA II (c.1425–1390 BC), (Note: Freu & Mazoyer 2007b: 76.) m. Nikkal-mati (Note: Freu & Mazoyer 2007b: 96.)
        - Ašmu-Nikkal, (Note: Freu & Mazoyer 2007b: 96-99.) m. ARNUWANDA I (c.1390–1370 BC) (Note: Freu & Mazoyer 2007b: 96-99.)
          - TUDḪALIYA III/Tašmi-Šarri (c.1370–1350 BC), (Note: Freu & Mazoyer 2007b: 155.) m. (1) Šatandu-Ḫeba; (=?) (2) Tadu-Ḫeba (Note: Freu & Mazoyer 2007b: 161-162, considering the two names variants, referring to the same queen.)
            - Tulpi-Teššub the Younger (Note: Freu & Mazoyer 2007b: 155-156, additionally suggesting to identify him with Tudḫaliya the Younger.)
            - Tudḫaliya the Younger d.c.1350 BC (Note: Freu & Mazoyer 2007b: 199-200.)
            - Ḫenti, (Note: Freu & Mazoyer 2007b: 199-201.) m. ŠUPPILULIUMA I (c.1350–1319 BC), (Note: Freu & Mazoyer 2007b: 198-201.) who m. (2) Tawananna (Malnigal) of Babylon (Note: Freu & Mazoyer 2007b: 257.)
              - ARNUWANDA II (c.1319–1318 BC) (Note: Freu & Mazoyer 2007b: 211.)
              - Telipinu, Priest of Kizzuwatna, then vassal king of Aleppo, left descendants (Note: Freu & Mazoyer 2007b: 211, 273, 276.)
              - Piyaššili/Šarri-Kušuḫ, vassal king of Carchemish, left descendants (Note: Freu & Mazoyer 2007b: 275.)
              - Zannanza, (Note: Freu & Mazoyer 2007b: 278, 284.) betrothed to Ankhesenamun (?) (Note: Freu & Mazoyer 2007b: 284.)
              - MURŠILI II (c.1318–1295 BC), (Note: Freu & Mazoyer 2008: 19.) m. (1) Gaššulawiya; (Note: Freu & Mazoyer 2008: 62-65.) (2) Danu-Ḫeba (Note: Freu & Mazoyer 2008: 65-67.)
                - Ḫalpašulupi (Note: Freu & Mazoyer 2008: 87.)
                - MUWATALLI II (c.1295–1272 BC) (Note: Freu & Mazoyer 2008: 87.)
                  - MURŠILI III/Urḫi-Teššub (c.1272–1265 BC) (Note: Freu & Mazoyer 2008: 128-129, 153.)
                  - Kurunta/Ulmi-Teššub, vassal king of Tarḫuntašša, left descendants (Note: Freu & Mazoyer 2008: 165-169.)
                - Maššanauzzi, (Note: Freu & Mazoyer 2008: 87.) m. King Mašturi of the Šeḫa River Land (Note: Freu & Mazoyer 2008: 130, 222.)
                - ḪATTUŠILI III (c.1265–1240 BC), (Note: Freu & Mazoyer 2008: 87, 163.) m. Pudu-Ḫeba (Note: Freu & Mazoyer 2008: 149-150.)
                  - Nerikkaili, (Note: Freu & Mazoyer 2008: 164, 201.) m. daughter of King Bentešina of Amurru (Note: Freu & Mazoyer 2010: 65.)
                  - Ḫuzziya (Note: Freu & Mazoyer 2008: 165, 201-203.)
                  - TUDḪALIYA IV/Tašmi-Šarruma (c.1240–1215 BC) (Note: Freu & Mazoyer 2008: 166, 201; Freu & Mazoyer 2010: 20-21, rejecting the alternative reading "Ḫišmi-Šarruma.")
                    - ARNUWANDA III (c.1215–1210 BC) (Note: Freu & Mazoyer 2010: 177-178.)
                    - ŠUPPILULIUMA II (c.1210–1185 BC) (Note: Freu & Mazoyer 2010: 178-180.)
                      - TUDḪALIYA V (?) (Note: Freu 2010–2011: 190-191.)
                      - Eḫli-Nikkal, m. King Ammurapi of Ugarit (Note: Freu 2010: 189.)
                  - Ḫannuti (Note: Freu & Mazoyer 2008: 166, 201-202.)
                  - Ḫešni (Note: Freu & Mazoyer 2008: 166, 201, 203-204.)
                  - Kurakura (Note: Freu & Mazoyer 2010: 66.)
                  - Ḫišmi-Šarruma (Note: Freu & Mazoyer 2010: 67-68.)
                  - Maathorneferure, (Note: Freu & Mazoyer 2008: 166, 239.) m. King Ramesses II of Egypt (Note: Freu & Mazoyer 2008: 166, 239.)
                  - Unknown, m. King Ramesses II of Egypt (Note: Freu & Mazoyer 2008: 166, 240-241.)
                  - Gaššulawiya, (Note: Freu & Mazoyer 2008: 166, 210.) m. King Bentešina of Amurru (Note: Freu & Mazoyer 2008: 166, 210.)
                  - Kiluš-Ḫeba, (Note: Freu & Mazoyer 2008: 166.) m. King Ari-Šarruma of Išuwa (Note: Freu & Mazoyer 2008: 166; Freu & Mazoyer 2010: 67.)
              - Muwatti, m. King Mašḫuiluwa of Mira-Kuwaliya (Note: Freu & Mazoyer 2008: 69.)
              - Unknown, m. King Šattiwaza of Mittani (Note: Freu & Mazoyer 2007b: 289.)
          - Kantuzzili, Priest of Kizzuwatna (Note: Freu & Mazoyer 2007b: 148-149.)
          - Pariyawatra (Note: Freu & Mazoyer 2007b: 148.)
          - Mannini (Note: Freu & Mazoyer 2007b: 148.)
          - Tulpi-Teššub (Note: Freu & Mazoyer 2007b: 148.)
          - Ašmi-Šarruma
      - Ziplantawiya, Queen, (Note: Freu & Mazoyer 2007b: 96-98.) m. Unknown
        - Attāi (Note: Freu & Mazoyer 2007b: 97.)

A detailed and annotated genealogy of Hittite New Kingdom monarchs and their families, as reconstructed by Jacques Freu in his multi-volume work Les Hittites et leur histoire, presented as an alternative to the less detailed and sometimes differing reconstruction based on Trevor Bryce, The Kingdom of the Hittites.

References:
- Freu, Jacques, and Michel Mazoyer (2007b), Les débuts du nouvel empire hittite, Paris.
- Freu, Jacques, and Michel Mazoyer (2008), L'apogée du nouvel empire hittite, Paris.
- Freu, Jacques, and Michel Mazoyer (2010), Le déclin et la chute du nouvel empire hittite, Paris.
- Freu, Jacques (2010–2011), "Le vase d'argent du musée des civilisations anatoliennes d'Ankara et la fin de l'empire hittite," Talanta 42–43 (2010–2011) 185-192.

== Bibliography ==
- Bilgin, Tayfun (2018), Official and Administration in the Hittite World, Berlin.
- Bryce, Trevor (1989), "Some Observations on the Chronology of Šuppiluliuma's Reign," Anatolian Studies 39 (1989) 9-30.
- Bryce, Trevor (2005), The Kingdom of the Hittites, Oxford.
- Burney, Charles (2004), Historical Dictionary of the Hittites, Lanham.
- Freu, Jacques, and Michel Mazoyer (2007b), Les débuts du nouvel empire hittite, Paris.
- Klengel, Horst (1999), Geschichte des Hethitischen Reiches, Leiden.
- Stavi, Boaz (2011), "The Genealogy of Suppiluliuma I," Altorientalische Forschungen 38 (2011) 226–239. online
- Taracha, Piotr (2016), "Tudhaliya III's Queens, Šuppiluliuma's Accession and Related Issues," in Sedat Erkut and Özlem Sir Gavaz (eds.), Studies in Honour of Ahmet Ünal Armağanı, Istanbul: 489–498.
