= Mursili =

There were three Hittite kings called Mursili:

- Mursili I, ca. 1556–1526 BCE (short chronology), and was likely a grandson of his predecessor, Hattusili I. His sister was Ḫarapšili and his wife was queen Kali.
- Mursili II, (also spelled Mursilis II) was a king of the Hittite Empire (New kingdom) ca. 1321–1295 BC (short chronology).
- Mursili III, also known as Urhi-Teshub, was a king of the Hittites who assumed the throne of the Hittite empire (New kingdom) at Tarhuntassa upon his father's death around 1272 BCE. He was a cousin of Tudhaliya IV and Queen Maathorneferure.

== See also ==
- List of Hittite kings
