= Bakırçay =

River in Turkey

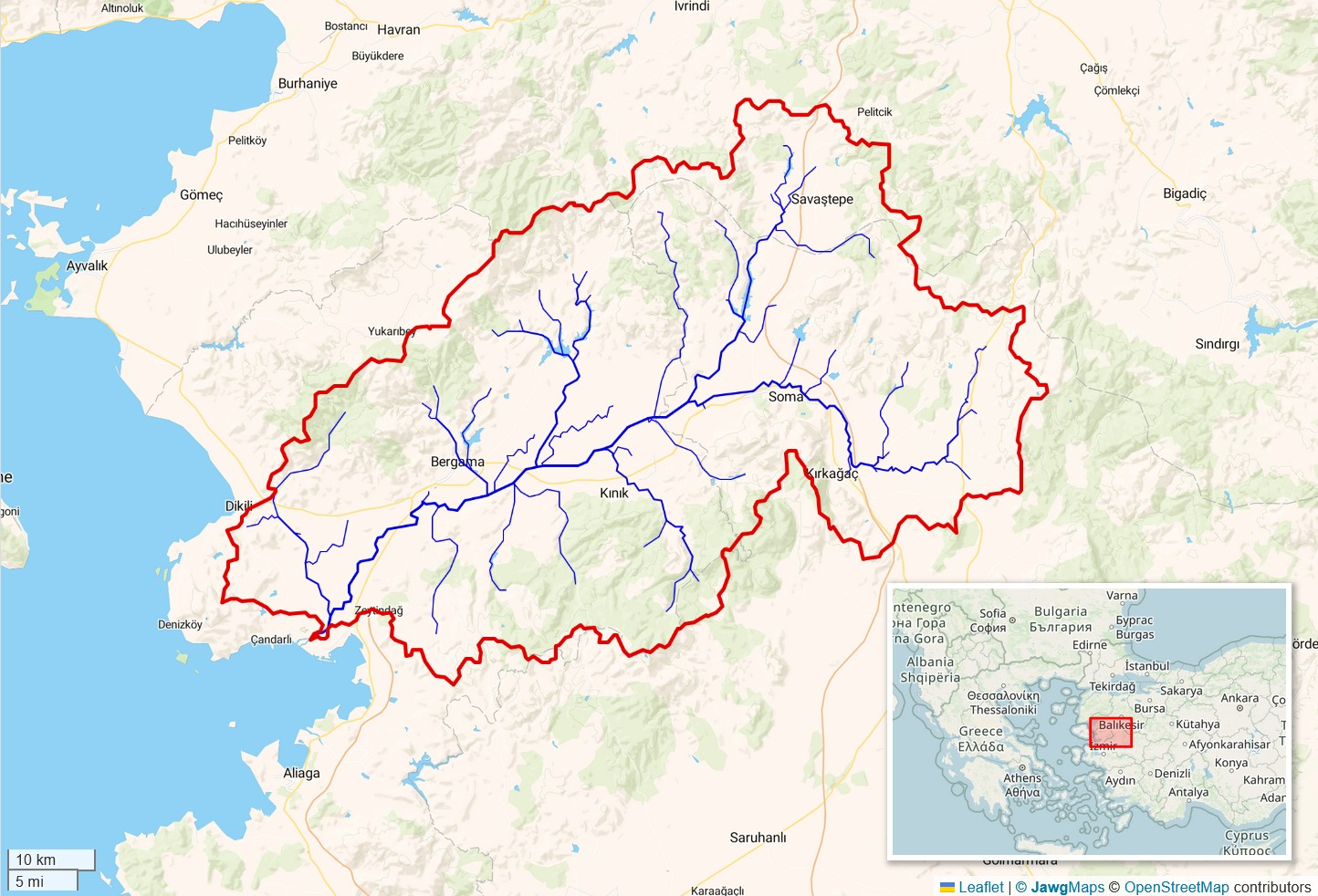
- Bakircay watershed (Interactive map)

- Location within Turkey

Physical characteristics
- Mouth
  - coordinates: 38.9327°N 26.9665°E
- Basin size: 3,400 km^{2}

The Bakırçay (Latin: Caicus, Ancient Greek: Κάϊκος) is a river in Turkey. It rises in the Gölcük Dağları mountains and debouches into the Gulf of Çandarlı.

In antiquity, the Bakırçay was or formed part of the Kaikos or Caicus River which flowed near the city of Pergamon and was the site of the Battle of the Caecus River. The Kaikos River is mentioned by Hesiod and Plutarch, who claims that its name was originally Astraeus (Ἀστραῖος) but was changed after Caicus, a son of Hermes, threw himself into it after sleeping with his sister Alcippe. However, since the course of the river has changed since antiquity it is not clear how the ancient names apply to the modern geographical features. Leake infers from the direction of L. Scipio's march from Troy to the Hyrcanian plain, that the Caicus was the north-eastern branch of the river of Pergamon which flows by Menduria (possibly Gergitha) and Balıkesir (Caesaraea). The Caicus as it seems is formed by two streams which meet between 50 and 65 km above its mouth, and it drains an extensive and fertile country. Strabo (p. 616) says that the sources of the Caicus are in a plain separated by the range of Temnos from the plain of Apiae, and that the plain of Apia lies above the plain of Thebe in the interior. He adds that there also flows from Tetanus a river (the Mysius) which joins the Caicus below its source. The Caicus enters the sea approximately 12 km from Pitane, and 3 km from Elaea. Elaea was the port of Pergamon, which was on the Caicus, approximately 25 km from Elaea.

The Bakırçay is one of the two candidates for the Hittite placename Seha River, site of the Seha River Land known from texts such as the Manapa-Tarhunta letter. The Gediz River is the other candidate.

== See also ==
- Bergama
- İzmir
- Karamenderes River
- Wilusa
