= Maathorneferure =

- Queen consort of Egypt; Great Royal Wife, Mistress of the Two Lands
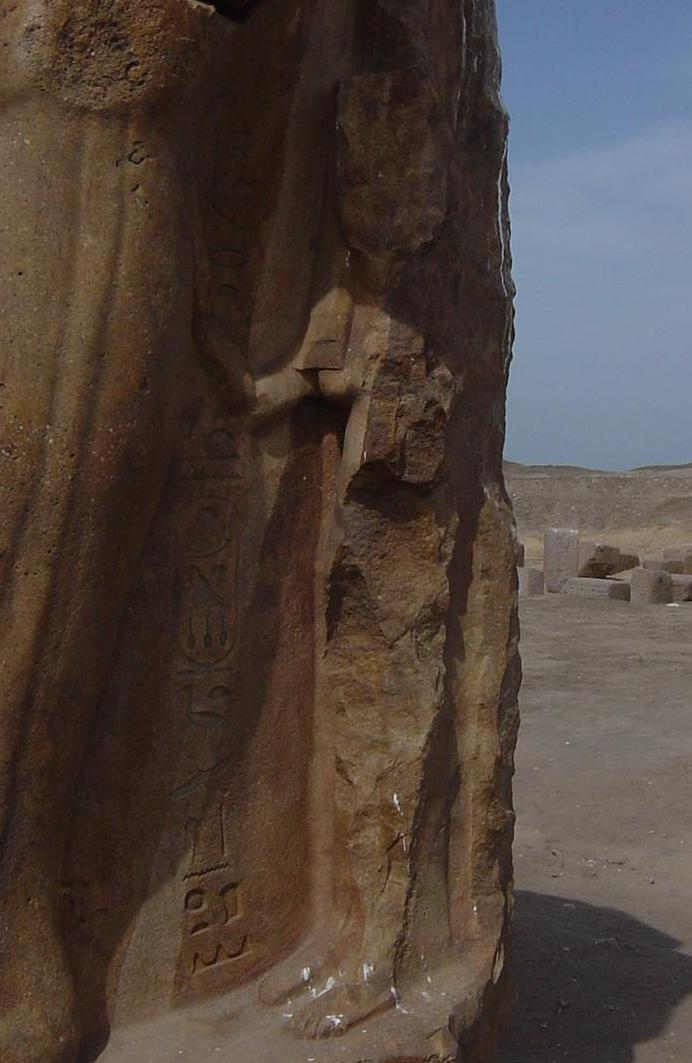
- Maathorneferure at Tanis
- Born: Šauškanu (?); Hatti
- Died: unknown
- Burial: unknown
- Spouse: Ramesses II
- Issue: Neferure
Egyptian name
ra D4 U2 t G5 nfr nfr nfr
- Dynasty: 19th of Egypt
- Father: Hattusili III
- Mother: Puduhepa
- Religion: Hittite religion (birth); Ancient Egyptian religion (conversion)

Maathorneferure (Hieroglyphic: Mȝʿt-Ḥr-nfrw-Rʿ, Maʿat-ḥōr-nefrurēʿ) was an ancient Egyptian queen, the Great Royal Wife of Ramesses II (1279–1213 BC, according to the standard "Low Chronology" for Egypt).

== Family ==
Maathorneferure was a daughter of the Hittite king Hattusili III and his wife, Queen Puduhepa. She was the sister of the crown prince Nerikkaili of Hatti and the sister of the later Hittite king Tudhaliya IV. The Egyptian sources claim that Maathornefrure was the eldest daughter of her parents, specifically identified as the king and queen of the Hittites.

Maathorneferure was married to the Egyptian Pharaoh Ramesses II in his Year 34, becoming a senior queen, the King's Great Wife. Ramesses II's mother and first two chief queens had died before Year 34, which carried the potential that Maathornefrure would become the chief queen; nevertheless, she shared the title with several of Ramesses II's daughters. The status of Maathornefrure as the King's Great Wife (unlike Ramesses' other foreign wives), seems to have been a precondition of the marriage alliance, set by her parents.

The Hittite princess' original name is not known with certainty, although Elmar Edel has suggested identifying her with the Šauškanu (name partly restored) mentioned in a letter from Hattusili III to Ramesses II. After arriving in Egypt and marrying Ramesses II, she was renamed Maʿat-ḥōr-nefrurēʿ ("One who sees Horus, the splendor of Ra") or Maʿat-nefrurēʿ ("One who sees the splendor of Ra"), depending on whether the falcon sign in the name is read out or not. Alternatively, it is possible that "maʿat-ḥōr" was a queenly title or epithet ("One who sees Horus"), and the new Egyptian name of the princess was more simply Nefrurēʿ ("the Splendor of Ra").

== Life ==
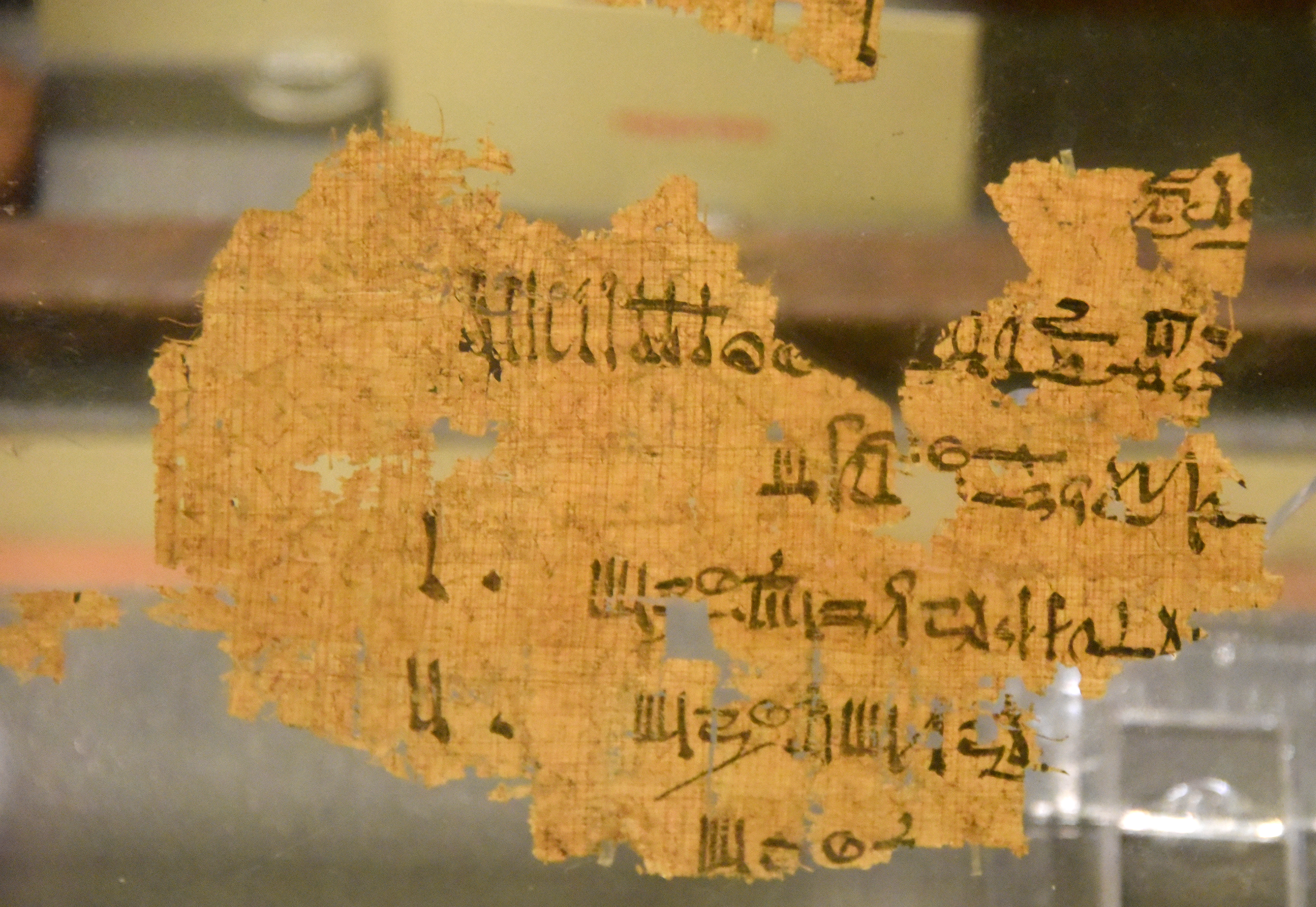
Piece of papyrus bearing the name of Maathorneferura, the Hittite princesess daughter of the great ruler of Khatti who married Ramesses II. From Gurob, Fayum, Egypt. The Petrie Museum of Egyptian Archaeology, London

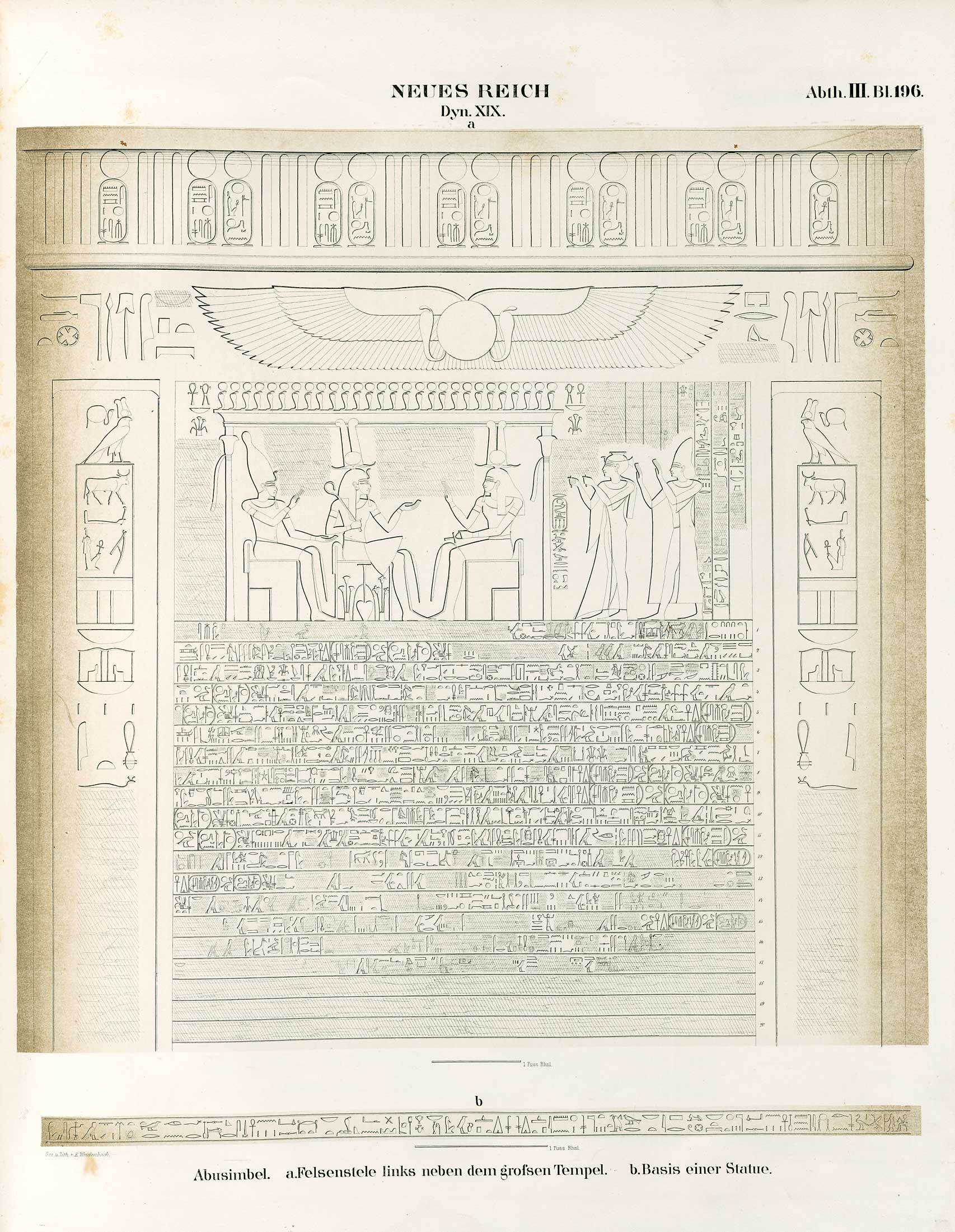
Maathorneferure and Hattusili III before Ramesses II

Egypt and the Hittite empire had been increasingly at odds since the demise of the kingdom of the Mittani, culminating at the Battle of Kadesh on 1 May 1274 BC. Maathorneferure's marriage to the Egyptian king was the conclusion of the subsequent peace process which had begun with the signing of a peace treaty thirteen years earlier, in the autumn of 1259 BC.

The marriage was preceded by long negotiations between the Egyptian and Hittite courts. Ramesses II expressed concern over continuing delays, while the Hittite queen Puduhepa explained that she had to send off her daughter in style with a suitable dowry, which was difficult to assemble quickly. The diplomatic correspondence reveals the actual parity between the two courts and the marriage being arranged. Within Egypt, however, as described on the "Marriage Stela" from the temple of Abu Simbel, for example, the event was presented as the submission of the Hittite king to Ramesses II, with Hattusili supposedly coming himself to offer Ramesses all his goods as tribute and his eldest daughter as wife. It was Ramesses' prayer to the god Seth that was credited for ensuring favorable weather during the winter journey. Later, Ramesses II sent a military escort to ensure the safety and honor of his bride, and she marched on to Egypt under the protection of both Hittite and Egyptian troops.

The Hittite princess left Hattusa, the Hittite capital, in the autumn of 1246 BC, accompanied by her mother, Queen Puduhepa, to the frontier. Maathornefrure was traveling with a vast escort, including troops guarding the princess and her dowry caravan laden with gold, silver, bronze, cattle and sheep, and slaves. At the Egyptian frontier, a message was dispatched to the Pharaoh: "They have traversed sheer mountains and treacherous passes to reach Your Majesty's border." Ramesses sent a military force to join the princess and her escort through Canaan and into Egypt. She arrived at Pi-Ramesse between December 1246 and January or February 1245 BC. The marriage and Ramesses II's second jubilee were commemorated on the "Marriage Stela" at the temple of Abu Simbel later the same year.

For Ramesses II, the marriage was perhaps valuable especially for the large dowry he acquired. Nevertheless, Maathornefrure resided at court for at least a while, receiving emissaries from her father, before apparently settling in the harem palace at Mer-wer (today's Gurob). This is sometimes interpreted as a disposal of an unappreciated queen. Maathorneferure appears to have given birth to a daughter, probably Neferure, the 31st daughter of Ramesses II according to the Abydos procession of his children. The birth of this grandchild was received as happy news by the Hittite king and queen, as indicated by some of the diplomatic correspondence.

Maathorneferure is mentioned on a papyrus found at Gurob. The partly preserved text on the papyrus states: [...] small bag, the king's wife Maathorneferure (may she live) (the daughter of) the great ruler of Hatti, [...] Dayt garment of 28 cubits, 4 palms, breadth 4 cubits, [bag?] of 14 cubits, 2 palms, breath 4 cubits - 2 items [...] palms, breath 4 cubits.

Currently at Tanis, a damaged colossal statue of Ramesses II depicts Maathornefrure's diminutive and mostly destroyed figure touching her husband's left leg, with her title, name cartouche, and filiation inscribed on the surface next to her: "The King's Great Wife, Lady of the Two Lands, Maʿat-ḥōr-nefrurēʿ, daughter of the great chief of Hatti." She is named similarly alongside her husband on a steatite tablet from Tell el-Yahudiya.

Maathornefrure might have died before Ramesses II married an unnamed second daughter of the Hittite king, as reported on the "Coptos Stela" from around Year 40 (1240 BC) or 42 (1238 BC) of Ramesses II.

== In later tradition ==
During the Persian or early Ptolemaic period, a convoluted memory of Maathorneferure's marriage to Ramesses II resulted in the tale inscribed on the "Bentresh stela" found in a Ptolemaic shrine at the Temple of Khonsu at Karnak. The stela reports that Ramesses II married the daughter of the chief of Bekhten (otherwise unknown) and made her the King's Great Wife Nefrure, and that in Year 23 he received an envoy from his father-in-law, asking for help in treating the illness of Nefrure's younger sister Bentresh. The royal scribe Dhutemhab was duly dispatched to Bekhten, and discovered that Bentresh was possessed by a spirit. Evidently unable to heal her, Dhutemhab returned to Ramesses II in Year 26. Ramesses II then sought the help of the statue of the god Khonsu-Pairsekher, determining that this would be the correct course of action through the oracle of Khonsu. The statue (god) was duly sent to Bekhten with a company of ships and chariots, arriving there after nearly a year and a half. The statue immediately healed Bentresh, casting out the possessive spirit. Her father, the chief of Bekhten, retained the miracle-working statue in his land until the god indicated it should be returned to Egypt in a prophetic dream. The statue arrived home at Karnak in Year 33.

The tale recorded on the "Bentresh stela" does not seem to be historically accurate, but evidently incorporates memories of historical events. The regnal years apart, Ramesses' foreign King's Great Wife Nefrure is apparently inspired by the Hittite Maathornefrure, and the royal scribe Dhutemhab was a historical courtier of Ramesses II. Healing by the statues of the gods is attested in the Late Bronze Age, a statue of Ishtar (Šauška) being sent to heal Amenhotep III on two occasions by the Mittanian king Tushratta, although in that instance, the statue was sent to Egypt. While the situation was markedly different from that described in the "Bentresh stela," the Hittite king Hattusili III did seek Ramesses II's assistance in curing his aging sister Matanazzi/Massanauzzi's infertility. In a surviving letter, Ramesses informed Hattusili that his sister was past childbearing years, but nonetheless promised to send a priest and physician to try to help her.

== Alternative spellings ==
Due to the vagaries of transcribing hieroglyphic names and realizing their approximate and conventional vocalization, there are several different orthographies of the queen's name, including:

With the falcon sign:

- Maʿat-ḥōr-nefrurēʿ, simplified to Maathornefrure
- Maâthorneferourê
- Maat-Hor-Néférourê
- Maat-Hor-neferure
- Maḥornefrurēʿ
- Maahornefrure

Omitting the falcon sign:

- Maʿat-nefrurēʿ, simplified to Maatnefrure
- Maat-nefrurê
- Matnefrure
- Manefrureʿ

Erroneous identification:

- Naptera, actually the Hittite rendition of the name of Nefertari, the first King's Great wife of Ramesses II.
