= Arnuwanda I =

Hittite king in 14th century BC

King of Hittite
- Reign: c. 1390 – c. 1380 BC
- Successor: Tudhaliya III
- Died: c. 1380 BC
- Spouse: Asmu-nikal
- Issue: Tudhaliya III; Asmi-Sarruma; Mannini; Pariyawatra; Kantuzzili; Tulpi-Tessub

Arnuwanda I (died c. 1380 BC) was a Hittite great king during the early 14th century BC, ruling from c. 1390 – c. 1380 BC.

== Origins ==
Arnuwanda I's parents are unknown. Because both Arnuwanda I and his wife Queen Ašmu-Nikkal are described on their respective seals as the children of Tudḫaliya II (sometimes called Tudḫaliya I or I/II), this was long interpreted as a marriage between siblings. This, however, was clearly forbidden by Hittite custom and law, and it is now generally agreed that while Ašmu-Nikkal was indeed the daughter of Tudḫaliya II, Arnuwanda I was only his son-in-law and possibly adoptive son, as the daughter's antiyant husband, an acceptable heir in the absence of a son.

== Association on the throne with Tudḫaliya II ==
Arnuwanda I began his reign in association with his father-in-law and predecessor, Tudḫaliya II, perhaps for as many as a dozen years or so. The simultaneous attestation of both men as great king indicates an association on the throne, something unusual in Hittite and Mesopotamian practice. Arnuwanda I collaborated with his father-in-law in the Hittite campaigns against Arzawa in western Anatolia. The two kings defeated Kupanta-Kurunta of Arzawa on one or two occasions, the second time rescuing their recalcitrant vassal Madduwatta, who had attacked Arzawa on his own. The Hittites, led by the general Kišnapili, subsequently saved Madduwatta again, this time from an attack by Attaršiya of Aḫḫiya. Madduwatta subsequently betrayed Kišnapili’s movements to the enemy, causing the ambushing and destruction of the Hittite forces, but somehow avoided punishment.

== Sole reign ==
=== Western border - the Problems with Madduwatta ===
When Tudḫaliya II died and Arnuwanda I became king, he continued to face the problems caused by the machinations of Madduwatta. The latter undertook hostile actions in the regions of Šallapa and Pittaša and made an alliance with his erstwhile enemy Kupanta-Kurunta of Arzawa, whom he offered his daughter as wife; nevertheless, Madduwatta portrayed this as a ploy against Kupanta-Kurunta, while protesting his loyalty to Arnuwanda I. Madduwatta attacked the rebellious land of Ḫapalla, ostensibly on behalf of the Hittite monarch, but followed his own interests in annexing it, and in intervening farther afield to the south, in the Lukka lands and as far as Alašiya (Cyprus). The last conquest was possibly undertaken in cooperation with another old enemy, Attaršiya of Aḫḫiya, and again elicited protest from Arnuwanda I. The Hittite monarch reclaimed Ḫapalla, but further developments with Madduwatta and Kupanta-Kurunta remain unclear.

The latter’s possible successor Uḫḫa-zalma (or Ḫuḫḫa-zalma) concluded a treaty with Arnuwanda I. Later, King Tarhuntaradu of Arzawa would expand at Hittite expense and correspond with the Egyptian pharaoh Amenhotep III as a fellow great king.

=== Northern border ===
Closer to home, on the northern frontier, Arnuwanda I was faced with the incursions of the Kaška, who raided and plundered numerous towns and temples, including the important sanctuary of Nerik, which had to be abandoned to the enemy. In addition to police actions and the conclusion of treaties with Kaška leaders, Arnuwanda I and his wife Ašmu-Nikkal offered up formal prayers to the gods, asking for their assistance in containing the threat. Given the gravity of the situation, Arnuwanda I also exacted oaths of loyalty from military commanders near the frontiers, both in the north and south. When the Hittite vassal at Paḫḫuwa, Mita, married the daughter of a declared enemy of the Hittite monarch, Ušapa, Arnuwanda I convened a public assembly, condemned Mita’s actions and demanded universal support in suppressing any disloyalty at Paḫḫuwa. The surviving sources do not preserve the resolution of the issue. Within the context of the tensions with Mita of Paḫḫuwa, there is reference to Arnuwanda I’s military intervention in the area of Kummaḫa (probably modern Kemah).

=== Other events ===
Preoccupied with issues in Anatolia, Arnuwanda I does not appear to have pursued an active policy in Syria. Here, Artatama I, the king of Mittani, concluded an alliance with Thutmose IV of Egypt, sending pharaoh his daughter as wife and effectively agreeing to a division of the region between Egypt and Mittani, which would last until the victorious campaigns of Arnuwanda I’s second successor, Šuppiluliuma I. For his part, Arnuwanda I resettled warriors from Išmerik (perhaps Siverek in northern Mesopotamia) and their families in Hittite-held Kizzuwatna. A treaty bound the elders of Ura (at or near Silifke) on the Mediterranean coast with the Hittite monarch, ensuring his access to the sea.

== Family ==
Arnuwanda I was married to Ašmu-Nikkal, the daughter of his co-ruler and predecessor Tudḫaliya II. The queen featured prominently throughout Arnuwanda I’s reign and may have survived her husband. Among their several children, the future king Tudḫaliya III (sometimes called Tudḫaliya II), also known by the Hurrian name of Tašmi-Šarri, appears to have been the eldest son and was appointed his father’s designated successor (tuḫkanti). Another son, Kantuzzili, was appointed priest (and governor) of Kizzuwatna. Other sons included Ašmi-Šarruma, Mannini, Pariyawatra, and Tulpi-Teššub.

Hittite New Kingdom royal family tree according to Trevor Bryce

Kantuzilli (Note: Scholars have suggested that Tudhaliya I/II was possibly a grandson of the Hittite king Huzziya II; the first Tudhaliya is now known to be the son of Kantuzzili (Bryce 1997, p. 131 suggested Himuili, but the new edition, Bryce 2005, p. 122, indicated Kantuzzili).)
Tudhaliya I/II (Note: Bryce (1997) does not consider it clear whether Tudhaliya I/II was one king or two (p. 133); the link points to Tudhaliya II. Among those who identify distinct kings Tudhaliya I and Tudhaliya II, Freu (2007) has Kantuzzili—his son Tudhaliya I—his son Hattusili II—his son Tudhaliya II (p. 311).)	Nikkalmati (Note: Bryce (1997), p. 139.)
Arnuwanda I	Asmunikal
Hattusili II? (Note: The existence of Hattusili II is doubted by many scholars (Bryce 1997, pp. 153–154; Bryce 2005, p. 141). Among those who accept the existence of Hattusili II, Freu (2007), p. 311, has Tudhaliya I—his son Hattusili II—his son Tudhaliya II.)	Tudhaliya III (Note: Bryce (1997), p. 158.)	Daduhepa (Note: Bryce (1997), p. 172.)	Zida (Note: Bryce (1997), p. 174.)
Tudhaliya the Younger (Note: Bryce (1997), p. 168.)	Henti (1)	Šuppiluliuma I	(2) Tawananna (Note: Also known as Malnigal; daughter of Burnaburias II of Babylonia (Bryce 1997, p. 173).)
Arnuwanda II	Telipinu (Note: ‘Great priest’ in Kizzuwadna and king (lugal) of Aleppo (Bryce 1997, p. 174).)	Sarri-Kusuh (Note: King (lugal) of Carchemish.) (Note: Bryce (1997), pp. 174, 203–204.)	Zannanza (Note: Zannanza died on his way to Egypt to marry a pharaoh's widow, probably Ankhesenpaaten, the widow of Tutankhamun (Bryce 1997, pp. 196–198).)	Gassulawiya (Note: Bryce (1997), p. 227.) (1)	Mursili II	(2) Tanuhepa (Note: Bryce (1997), p. 230.)
Talmi-Sarruma (Note: Bryce (1997), p. 220.)	Sahurunuwa (Note: Bryce (1997), p. 222.)	Muwatalli II	Halpasulupi (Note: Haas (2006), p. 91.)	Massanauzzi (Note: Massanauzzi married Masturi, king of the Seha River Land (Bryce 1997, p. 313).)	Hattusili III (Note: Bryce (1997), p. 296.)	Puduhepa (Note: Puduhepa was the daughter of the Kizzuwadnan priest Pentipsarri (Bryce 1997, p. 273).)
Ini-Tesub (Note: Bryce (1997), pp. 346, 363.)	Urhi-Tesub	Kurunta (Note: King (lugal) of Tarhuntassa (Bryce 1997, p. 296); apparently later Great King of Hatti (Bryce 1997, p. 354).)	Nerikkaili (Note: Nerikkaili married a daughter of Bentesina, king of Amurru (Bryce 1997, p. 294).)	numerous daughters (Note: Two daughters of Hattusili III were married to the pharaoh Ramesses II; one was given the Egyptian name Ma(hor)nefrure. Another, Gassuwaliya, married into the royal house of Amurru. Kilushepa was married to a king of Isuwa. A daughter married into the royal family of Babylon. A sister of Tudhaliya IV married Sausgamuwa, king of Amurru after his father Bentesina. From Bryce (1997), pp. 294 and 312.) and sons (Note: Bryce (1997), p. 332.)	Tudhaliya IV (Note: Bryce (1997), p. 363. Tudhaliya IV probably married a Babylonian princess, known by her title of Great Princess (dumu.sal gal) (Bryce 1997, pp. 294, 331).)
Talmi-Tesub (Note: Bryce (1997), p. 363.)	Arnuwanda III (Note: Bryce (1997), p. 361.)	Suppiluliuma II (Note: Last documented Great King of the Land of Hatti.)
Kuzi-Tesub (Note: King and then Great King of Carchemish (Bryce 1997, pp. 384–385).)

- (1) = 1st spouse
- (2) = 2nd spouse
- Small caps indicates a Great King (LUGAL.GAL) of the Land of Hatti; italic small caps indicates a Great Queen or Tawananna.
- Dashed lines indicate adoption.
- Solid lines indicate marriage (if horizontal) or parentage (if vertical).

References:
- Trevor Bryce (1997). The Kingdom of the Hittites. Oxford, England: Clarendon Press.
- Trevor Bryce (2005). The Kingdom of the Hittites (new edition). Oxford, England: Clarendon Press.
- Trevor Bryce (2012). The World of the Neo-Hittite Kingdoms. Oxford, England: Oxford University Press.
- Jacques Freu (2007). Les débuts du nouvel empire hittite. Paris, France: L'Harmattan.
- Volkert Haas (2006). Die hethitische Literatur. Berlin, Germany: de Gruyter.

== Gallery ==
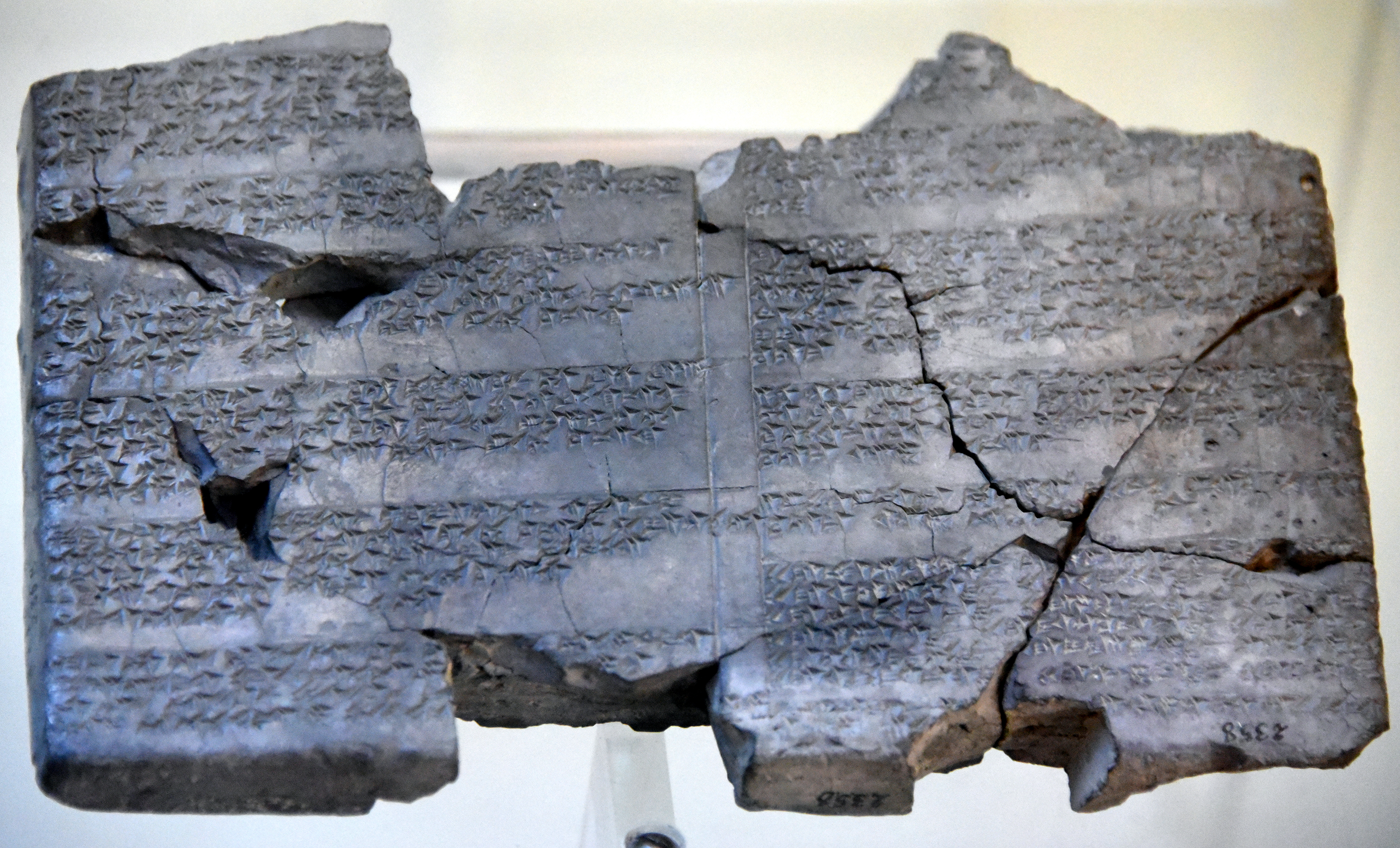
Prayers of Arnuwanda and Asmu-Nikkal, 14th century BC, from Hattusa, Istanbul Archaeological Museum

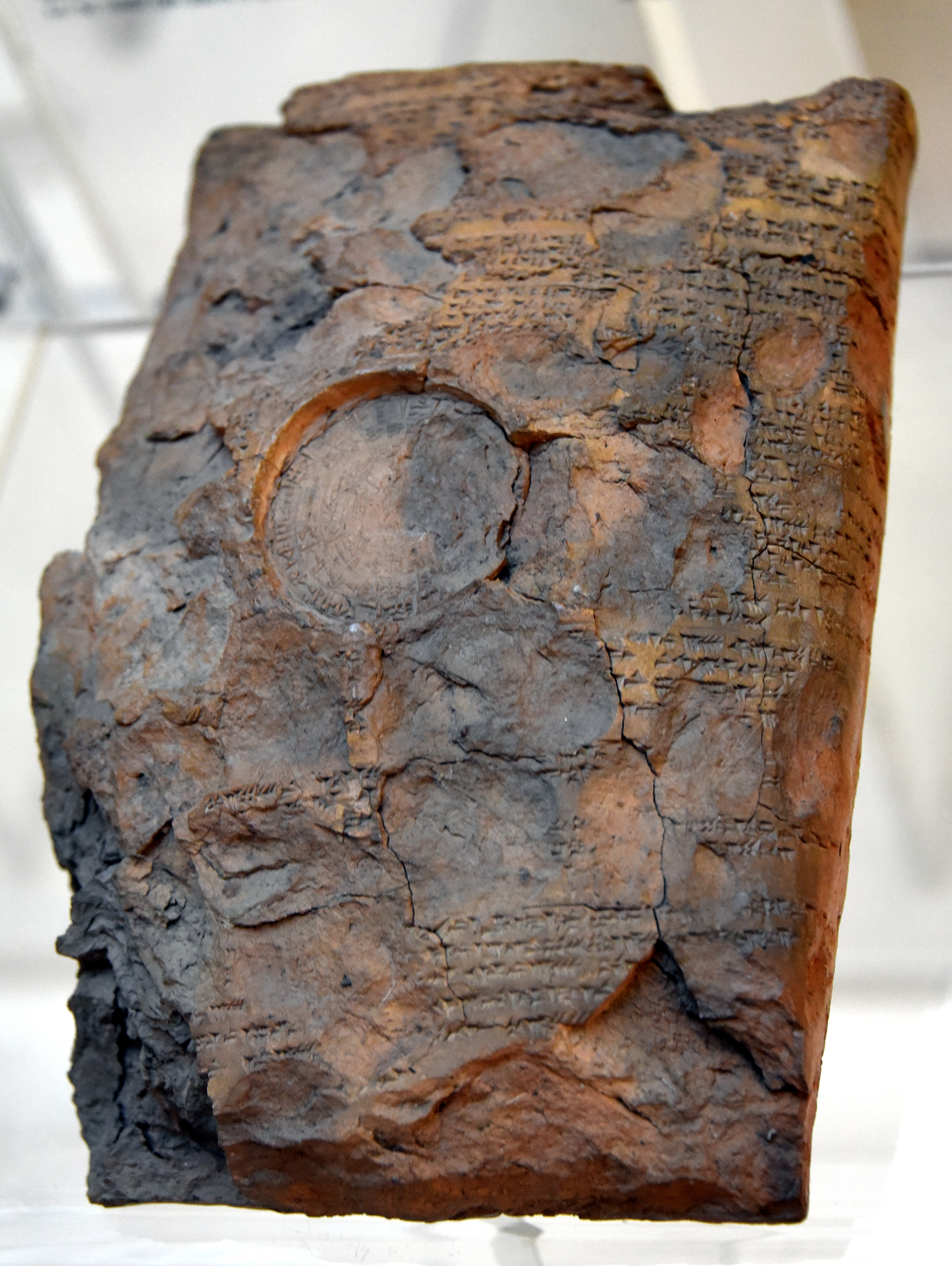
Gifts given by Arnuwanda and Asmu-Nikkal, 14th century BC, from Hattusa, Istanbul Archaeological Museum

== See also ==
- History of the Hittites
- Madduwatta

== Bibliography ==
- Astour, Michael C. (1989), Hittite History and the Absolute Chronology of the Bronze Age, Partille.
- Beal, Richard R. (1983), "Studies in Hittite History," Journal of Cuneiform Studies 35 (1983) 115-126.
- Bryce, Trevor (2005), The Kingdom of the Hittites, Oxford.
- De Martino, Stefano (2010), "Nomi di persona hurriti nella prima età imperiale ittita," Orientalia 79 (2010) 130-139.
- Freu, Jacques, and Michel Mazoyer (2007b), Les débuts du nouvel empire hittite, Paris.
- Klengel, Horst (1999), Geschichte des Hethitischen Reiches, Leiden.
- Kuhrt, Amélie (1995, reprinted 2020), The Ancient Near East: c.3000–330 BC, Volume One, Routledge.
- Melchert, Craig (2003), The Luwians, Leiden.
- Weeden, Mark (2022), "The Hittite Empire," in Karen Radner et al. (eds.), The Oxford History of the Ancient Near East, vol. 3 (From the Hyksos to the Late Second Millennium BC), Oxford: 529–622.
- Yakubovich, Ilya (2008), Sociolinguistics of the Luvian language, doctoral dissertation, University of Chicago. online

Regnal titles
Preceded by	King of Hittite c. 1390 – c. 1380 BC	Succeeded by Tudhaliya III
