= Tanuhepa =

Hittite queen

Tanuhepa (Danuhepa; fl. 1300 BCE) was queen of the Hittite Empire, as the second wife of Muršili II.

== Biography ==
During the reign of the next Hittite king, her stepson Muwatalli II, she was put on trial and probably banished. However she was reinstated during the reign of the following king, Mursili III.

She came from a Hurrian background.
