= Tudhaliya II =

King of the Hittites

- King of the Hittites
- Reign: c. 1425–c. 1390 BC
- Predecessor: Ḫattušili II ?
- Successor: Arnuwanda I
- Spouse: Nikkal-mati
- Issue: Ašmu-Nikkal
- Father: Ḫattušili II ?
- Mother: Ašmu-Ḫeba ?

Tudḫaliya II (sometimes identified with and designated Tudḫaliya I) was a Hittite great king in the late 15th/early 14th century BC, ruling in perhaps c. 1425–c. 1390 BC. He was the father-in-law and predecessor of Arnuwanda I.

== Identity ==
The numbering of Hittite kings named Tudḫaliya varies between scholars because of debate over the identity (or not) between the first two bearers of the name. A Tudḫaliya, now attested as the son of a certain Kantuzzili, succeeded Muwatalli I, after the latter was murdered by the officials Ḫimuili and Kantuzzili (not necessarily identical to Tudḫaliya’s father). The same or a distinct Tudḫaliya, the king discussed in the present article, was the father-in-law and predecessor of Arnuwanda I. Because of uncertainty, scholars are divided in the interpretation of the evidence. Many scholars envision a single Tudḫaliya (I or I/II), while others consider two separate kings, Tudḫaliya I and Tudḫaliya II.

The rationale for maintaining a distinction between the two is presented by Jacques Freu, who notes, inter alia, that Tudḫaliya I was the son of the non-reigning Kantuzzili, while Tudḫaliya II writes that he ascended the throne as a youth after his father’s death; similarly, Tudḫaliya II's sister Ziplantawiya was the daughter of a king. Additionally, Freu posits that the Šunaššura Treaty between the Hittite Kingdom and Kizzuwatna reflects successive equal and unequal treaty arrangements under two different sets of kings on both sides, discerns three Tudḫaliyas as ancestors of Muršili II on his “cruciform seal,” and argues that the Tudḫaliyas who engaged in repeated military action in Syria and in western Anatolia should be distinguished from each other to avoid an overly long reign.

The treatment below tentatively follows Freu's distinction of two 15th-century BC Hittite great kings named Tudḫaliya.

== Family ==
Freu's reconstruction identifies Tudḫaliya I and Tudḫaliya II as grandfather and grandson, with the obscure and short-lived Ḫattušili II being the intervening generation. If this is correct, Tudḫaliya II would have been the son of Ḫattušili II, possibly by Ašmu-Ḫeba, and would have succeeded his father at an early age according to his own testimony. Tudḫaliya II had a sister named Ziplantawiya, who was titled queen, perhaps to fulfill the respective functions during her brother’s youth. At a later date, Ziplantawiya was suspected of witchcraft against her brother and sister-in-law, as indicated by the description of an anti-magical ritual undertaken to protect Tudḫaliya II, his wife Nikkal-mati, and their sons. The sons appear to have predeceased their parents, but a daughter, Ašmu-Nikkal, survived. Her husband, Arnuwanda, became Tudḫaliya’s chosen heir and was possibly adopted and apparently associated on the throne by his father-in-law.

== Reign ==
Perhaps already in Tudḫaliya II's father's reign, the western Anatolian confederacy of Arzawa had begun to encroach on Hittite control in the peninsula. Tudḫaliya II marched against Arzawa, including the Seḫa River Land, Ḫapalla, and Wallarima, defeating them and sending captives and military equipment back home. A revolt in his rear forced him to turn to Aššuwa, which was successfully subdued; among the confederates of Aššuwa are listed Wilušiya and Taruiša, the likely Hittite renditions of Greek [W]ilios (Ilion) and Troia. The successful campaigns in the west resulted in a massive dislocation of captives and goods from the defeated countries to the Hittite core territory or other areas under Hittite rule. Since these included military personnel and equipment, this allowed for a captive prince, Kukkulli, to stir up a revolt among them. Tudḫaliya was able to suppress it.

While Tudḫailya II was busy in the west, the northern parts of his kingdom had come under Kaška attacks from the north. They were defeated in a two-year campaign, allowing Tudḫaliya a year's respite from war. Additionally, Tudḫaliya II's successor Arnuwanda I recalled in a later text Tudḫaliya's efforts against Mittani and Išuwa. Tudḫaliya defeated the Išuwans, some of whom sought refuge with their ally, Sauštatar of Mittani, who refused to extradite them, resulting in further Hittite military action without permanent gains. It was perhaps in this context that Tudḫaliya II concluded his unequal treaty with Šunaššura II of Kizzuwatna, recalling that country's earlier treaty (and submission to the Hittites?) under Tudḫaliya’s grandfather. Later, perhaps during the suspected association between Tudḫaliya II and Arnuwanda I on the throne, Kizzuwatna would be annexed by the Hittite Kingdom.

Towards the end of Tudḫaliya II's reign, he and his associate and successor Arnuwanda II returned to the western front in a victorious military campaign against Kupanta-Kurunta, the king of Arzawa. The context of this war includes the turbulent behavior of a western Anatolian prince, Madduwata, who had been "saved" from Attaršiya of Aḫḫiya (the names compare to Atreus and Achaeans) by Tudḫaliya II and given successive appanages in the mountainous areas of Ḫairyati and Zippašla by the Hittite monarch. Nevertheless, Madduwata broke his oaths to keep to his lands, and intervened far and wide in western Anatolia, including the Lukka Lands and even Alašiya (Cyprus). He provoked and lost a fight with the king of Arzawa, caused the ambush and death of two Hittite commanders in the Lukka Lands by betraying their plans to the enemy, and later became an ally of Arzawa. While the Hittite sources claimed success, any gains in the west proved fleeting.

If Tudḫaliya I and Tudḫaliya II are to be identified as the same individual, he would also be credited with an intervention in Syria, where the king punished the city of Aleppo for its desertion to Mittani by destroying it, according to the historical introduction to the later treaty between the Hittite great king Muršili II and his nephew, Talmi-Šarumma of Aleppo. See Tudḫaliya I.

Hittite New Kingdom royal family tree according to Trevor Bryce

Kantuzilli (Note: Scholars have suggested that Tudhaliya I/II was possibly a grandson of the Hittite king Huzziya II; the first Tudhaliya is now known to be the son of Kantuzzili (Bryce 1997, p. 131 suggested Himuili, but the new edition, Bryce 2005, p. 122, indicated Kantuzzili).)
Tudhaliya I/II (Note: Bryce (1997) does not consider it clear whether Tudhaliya I/II was one king or two (p. 133); the link points to Tudhaliya II. Among those who identify distinct kings Tudhaliya I and Tudhaliya II, Freu (2007) has Kantuzzili—his son Tudhaliya I—his son Hattusili II—his son Tudhaliya II (p. 311).)	Nikkalmati (Note: Bryce (1997), p. 139.)
Arnuwanda I	Asmunikal
Hattusili II? (Note: The existence of Hattusili II is doubted by many scholars (Bryce 1997, pp. 153–154; Bryce 2005, p. 141). Among those who accept the existence of Hattusili II, Freu (2007), p. 311, has Tudhaliya I—his son Hattusili II—his son Tudhaliya II.)	Tudhaliya III (Note: Bryce (1997), p. 158.)	Daduhepa (Note: Bryce (1997), p. 172.)	Zida (Note: Bryce (1997), p. 174.)
Tudhaliya the Younger (Note: Bryce (1997), p. 168.)	Henti (1)	Šuppiluliuma I	(2) Tawananna (Note: Also known as Malnigal; daughter of Burnaburias II of Babylonia (Bryce 1997, p. 173).)
Arnuwanda II	Telipinu (Note: ‘Great priest’ in Kizzuwadna and king (lugal) of Aleppo (Bryce 1997, p. 174).)	Sarri-Kusuh (Note: King (lugal) of Carchemish.) (Note: Bryce (1997), pp. 174, 203–204.)	Zannanza (Note: Zannanza died on his way to Egypt to marry a pharaoh's widow, probably Ankhesenpaaten, the widow of Tutankhamun (Bryce 1997, pp. 196–198).)	Gassulawiya (Note: Bryce (1997), p. 227.) (1)	Mursili II	(2) Tanuhepa (Note: Bryce (1997), p. 230.)
Talmi-Sarruma (Note: Bryce (1997), p. 220.)	Sahurunuwa (Note: Bryce (1997), p. 222.)	Muwatalli II	Halpasulupi (Note: Haas (2006), p. 91.)	Massanauzzi (Note: Massanauzzi married Masturi, king of the Seha River Land (Bryce 1997, p. 313).)	Hattusili III (Note: Bryce (1997), p. 296.)	Puduhepa (Note: Puduhepa was the daughter of the Kizzuwadnan priest Pentipsarri (Bryce 1997, p. 273).)
Ini-Tesub (Note: Bryce (1997), pp. 346, 363.)	Urhi-Tesub	Kurunta (Note: King (lugal) of Tarhuntassa (Bryce 1997, p. 296); apparently later Great King of Hatti (Bryce 1997, p. 354).)	Nerikkaili (Note: Nerikkaili married a daughter of Bentesina, king of Amurru (Bryce 1997, p. 294).)	numerous daughters (Note: Two daughters of Hattusili III were married to the pharaoh Ramesses II; one was given the Egyptian name Ma(hor)nefrure. Another, Gassuwaliya, married into the royal house of Amurru. Kilushepa was married to a king of Isuwa. A daughter married into the royal family of Babylon. A sister of Tudhaliya IV married Sausgamuwa, king of Amurru after his father Bentesina. From Bryce (1997), pp. 294 and 312.) and sons (Note: Bryce (1997), p. 332.)	Tudhaliya IV (Note: Bryce (1997), p. 363. Tudhaliya IV probably married a Babylonian princess, known by her title of Great Princess (dumu.sal gal) (Bryce 1997, pp. 294, 331).)
Talmi-Tesub (Note: Bryce (1997), p. 363.)	Arnuwanda III (Note: Bryce (1997), p. 361.)	Suppiluliuma II (Note: Last documented Great King of the Land of Hatti.)
Kuzi-Tesub (Note: King and then Great King of Carchemish (Bryce 1997, pp. 384–385).)

- (1) = 1st spouse
- (2) = 2nd spouse
- Small caps indicates a Great King (LUGAL.GAL) of the Land of Hatti; italic small caps indicates a Great Queen or Tawananna.
- Dashed lines indicate adoption.
- Solid lines indicate marriage (if horizontal) or parentage (if vertical).

References:
- Trevor Bryce (1997). The Kingdom of the Hittites. Oxford, England: Clarendon Press.
- Trevor Bryce (2005). The Kingdom of the Hittites (new edition). Oxford, England: Clarendon Press.
- Trevor Bryce (2012). The World of the Neo-Hittite Kingdoms. Oxford, England: Oxford University Press.
- Jacques Freu (2007). Les débuts du nouvel empire hittite. Paris, France: L'Harmattan.
- Volkert Haas (2006). Die hethitische Literatur. Berlin, Germany: de Gruyter.
Notes:

Hittite New Kingdom royal family tree according to Jacques Freu
- Kantuzzili, (Note: Freu & Mazoyer 2007b: 24, 34, 45.) m. Walanni, perhaps daughter of Zidanta II (Note: Freu & Mazoyer 2007b: 24.)
  - TUDḪALIYA I (c.1465–1440 BC), (Note: Freu & Mazoyer 2007b: 24, 34, 45.) m. Kattešḫapi (?) (Note: Freu & Mazoyer 2007b: 63-68.)
    - ḪATTUŠILI II (c.1440–1425 BC), (Note: Freu & Mazoyer 2007b: 68.) m. Ašmu-Ḫeba (?) (Note: Freu & Mazoyer 2007b: 97.)
      - TUDḪALIYA II (c.1425–1390 BC), (Note: Freu & Mazoyer 2007b: 76.) m. Nikkal-mati (Note: Freu & Mazoyer 2007b: 96.)
        - Ašmu-Nikkal, (Note: Freu & Mazoyer 2007b: 96-99.) m. ARNUWANDA I (c.1390–1370 BC) (Note: Freu & Mazoyer 2007b: 96-99.)
          - TUDḪALIYA III/Tašmi-Šarri (c.1370–1350 BC), (Note: Freu & Mazoyer 2007b: 155.) m. (1) Šatandu-Ḫeba; (=?) (2) Tadu-Ḫeba (Note: Freu & Mazoyer 2007b: 161-162, considering the two names variants, referring to the same queen.)
            - Tulpi-Teššub the Younger (Note: Freu & Mazoyer 2007b: 155-156, additionally suggesting to identify him with Tudḫaliya the Younger.)
            - Tudḫaliya the Younger d.c.1350 BC (Note: Freu & Mazoyer 2007b: 199-200.)
            - Ḫenti, (Note: Freu & Mazoyer 2007b: 199-201.) m. ŠUPPILULIUMA I (c.1350–1319 BC), (Note: Freu & Mazoyer 2007b: 198-201.) who m. (2) Tawananna (Malnigal) of Babylon (Note: Freu & Mazoyer 2007b: 257.)
              - ARNUWANDA II (c.1319–1318 BC) (Note: Freu & Mazoyer 2007b: 211.)
              - Telipinu, Priest of Kizzuwatna, then vassal king of Aleppo, left descendants (Note: Freu & Mazoyer 2007b: 211, 273, 276.)
              - Piyaššili/Šarri-Kušuḫ, vassal king of Carchemish, left descendants (Note: Freu & Mazoyer 2007b: 275.)
              - Zannanza, (Note: Freu & Mazoyer 2007b: 278, 284.) betrothed to Ankhesenamun (?) (Note: Freu & Mazoyer 2007b: 284.)
              - MURŠILI II (c.1318–1295 BC), (Note: Freu & Mazoyer 2008: 19.) m. (1) Gaššulawiya; (Note: Freu & Mazoyer 2008: 62-65.) (2) Danu-Ḫeba (Note: Freu & Mazoyer 2008: 65-67.)
                - Ḫalpašulupi (Note: Freu & Mazoyer 2008: 87.)
                - MUWATALLI II (c.1295–1272 BC) (Note: Freu & Mazoyer 2008: 87.)
                  - MURŠILI III/Urḫi-Teššub (c.1272–1265 BC) (Note: Freu & Mazoyer 2008: 128-129, 153.)
                  - Kurunta/Ulmi-Teššub, vassal king of Tarḫuntašša, left descendants (Note: Freu & Mazoyer 2008: 165-169.)
                - Maššanauzzi, (Note: Freu & Mazoyer 2008: 87.) m. King Mašturi of the Šeḫa River Land (Note: Freu & Mazoyer 2008: 130, 222.)
                - ḪATTUŠILI III (c.1265–1240 BC), (Note: Freu & Mazoyer 2008: 87, 163.) m. Pudu-Ḫeba (Note: Freu & Mazoyer 2008: 149-150.)
                  - Nerikkaili, (Note: Freu & Mazoyer 2008: 164, 201.) m. daughter of King Bentešina of Amurru (Note: Freu & Mazoyer 2010: 65.)
                  - Ḫuzziya (Note: Freu & Mazoyer 2008: 165, 201-203.)
                  - TUDḪALIYA IV/Tašmi-Šarruma (c.1240–1215 BC) (Note: Freu & Mazoyer 2008: 166, 201; Freu & Mazoyer 2010: 20-21, rejecting the alternative reading "Ḫišmi-Šarruma.")
                    - ARNUWANDA III (c.1215–1210 BC) (Note: Freu & Mazoyer 2010: 177-178.)
                    - ŠUPPILULIUMA II (c.1210–1185 BC) (Note: Freu & Mazoyer 2010: 178-180.)
                      - TUDḪALIYA V (?) (Note: Freu 2010–2011: 190-191.)
                      - Eḫli-Nikkal, m. King Ammurapi of Ugarit (Note: Freu 2010: 189.)
                  - Ḫannuti (Note: Freu & Mazoyer 2008: 166, 201-202.)
                  - Ḫešni (Note: Freu & Mazoyer 2008: 166, 201, 203-204.)
                  - Kurakura (Note: Freu & Mazoyer 2010: 66.)
                  - Ḫišmi-Šarruma (Note: Freu & Mazoyer 2010: 67-68.)
                  - Maathorneferure, (Note: Freu & Mazoyer 2008: 166, 239.) m. King Ramesses II of Egypt (Note: Freu & Mazoyer 2008: 166, 239.)
                  - Unknown, m. King Ramesses II of Egypt (Note: Freu & Mazoyer 2008: 166, 240-241.)
                  - Gaššulawiya, (Note: Freu & Mazoyer 2008: 166, 210.) m. King Bentešina of Amurru (Note: Freu & Mazoyer 2008: 166, 210.)
                  - Kiluš-Ḫeba, (Note: Freu & Mazoyer 2008: 166.) m. King Ari-Šarruma of Išuwa (Note: Freu & Mazoyer 2008: 166; Freu & Mazoyer 2010: 67.)
              - Muwatti, m. King Mašḫuiluwa of Mira-Kuwaliya (Note: Freu & Mazoyer 2008: 69.)
              - Unknown, m. King Šattiwaza of Mittani (Note: Freu & Mazoyer 2007b: 289.)
          - Kantuzzili, Priest of Kizzuwatna (Note: Freu & Mazoyer 2007b: 148-149.)
          - Pariyawatra (Note: Freu & Mazoyer 2007b: 148.)
          - Mannini (Note: Freu & Mazoyer 2007b: 148.)
          - Tulpi-Teššub (Note: Freu & Mazoyer 2007b: 148.)
          - Ašmi-Šarruma
      - Ziplantawiya, Queen, (Note: Freu & Mazoyer 2007b: 96-98.) m. Unknown
        - Attāi (Note: Freu & Mazoyer 2007b: 97.)

A detailed and annotated genealogy of Hittite New Kingdom monarchs and their families, as reconstructed by Jacques Freu in his multi-volume work Les Hittites et leur histoire, presented as an alternative to the less detailed and sometimes differing reconstruction based on Trevor Bryce, The Kingdom of the Hittites.

References:
- Freu, Jacques, and Michel Mazoyer (2007b), Les débuts du nouvel empire hittite, Paris.
- Freu, Jacques, and Michel Mazoyer (2008), L'apogée du nouvel empire hittite, Paris.
- Freu, Jacques, and Michel Mazoyer (2010), Le déclin et la chute du nouvel empire hittite, Paris.
- Freu, Jacques (2010–2011), "Le vase d'argent du musée des civilisations anatoliennes d'Ankara et la fin de l'empire hittite," Talanta 42–43 (2010–2011) 185-192.

== See also ==
- History of the Hittites

== Bibliography ==
- Astour, Michael C. (1989), Hittite History and the Absolute Chronology of the Bronze Age, Partille.
- Beckman, Gary (1996), Hittite Diplomatic Texts, Atlanta.
- Beckman, Gary (2000), "Hittite Chronology," Akkadica 119-120 (2000) 19-32.
- Bryce, Trevor (2005), The Kingdom of the Hittites, Oxford.
- Freu, Jacques, and Michel Mazoyer (2007a), Des origins à la fin de l’ancien royaume hittite, Paris.
- Freu, Jacques, and Michel Mazoyer (2007b), Les débuts du nouvel empire hittite, Paris.
- Klengel, Horst (1999), Geschichte des Hethitischen Reiches, Leiden.
- Kuhrt, Amélie (1995), The Ancient Near East c. 3000–330 BC, vol. 1., London.
- Weeden, Mark (2022), "The Hittite Empire," in Karen Radner et al. (eds.), The Oxford History of the Ancient Near East, vol. 3 (From the * Hyksos to the Late Second Millennium BC), Oxford: 529-622.
- Wilhelm, Gernot (2004), "Generation Count in Hittite Chronology," in Herman Hunger and Regine Pruzsinszky, eds., Mesopotamian Dark Age Revisited, Vienna, 71-79.

Regnal titles
Preceded by Ḫattušili II (?)	Hittite king c. 1380–1370 BC	Succeeded by Arnuwanda I
