= Muršili III =

- Other name: Urhi-Teshub
- Title: King of the Hittites
- Predecessor: Muwatalli II
- Successor: Hattusili III
- Parent: King Muwatalli II
- Relatives: Tudhaliya IV (cousin)

Muršili III, also known as Urhi-Teshub, was a king of the Hittites who assumed the throne of the Hittite empire (New Kingdom) at Tarhuntassa upon his father's death. He was a cousin of Tudhaliya IV and Queen Maathorneferure. He ruled ca. 1282–1275 BC (middle chronology) or 1272–1265 BC (short chronology).

== Family ==
He was the eldest surviving son of Muwatalli II. He was a grandson of Muršili II.

Muršili III seemingly had a son. A certain Hartapu calls himself a great king and son of the great king Muršili, who normally is identified with Muršili III. Hartapu likely has ruled Tarhuntassa in the 2nd half of the 13th century BC.

== Reign ==
During his reign, Muršili III reverted the capital from Tarhuntassa (as it had been under Muwatalli) back to Hattusa (KBo 21.15 i 11-12). However, the Assyrians captured Hanigalbat, which severely weakened his legitimacy to rule over the Hittite Empire. In his seventh year, Muršili III attacked and seized control of his uncle Hattusili's regional strongholds of Hakpissa and Nerik within the Hittite Empire in order to remove Hattusili as a threat to the throne. Hakpissa served as the centre of Hattusili's power while Nerik was under Hattusilis's sway from the latter's position as high priest there. Hattusili then states in a well-known text:

"For seven years I submitted [to the king]. But at a divine command and with human urging, Urhi-Tesub sought to destroy me. He took Hakpissa and Nerik from me. Now I submitted to him no longer. I made war against him. But I committed no crime in doing so, by rising up against him with chariots or in the palace. In civilised manner I communicated thus with him: 'You have begun hostilities with me. Now you are Great King, but I am king of only one fortress. That is all you have left me. Come! Istar of Samuha and the Storm God of Nerik shall decide the case for us!' Since I wrote to Urhi-Tesub in this manner, if anyone now says: 'Why after previously making him king do you now write to him about war?' (my reply would be); 'If he had not begun fighting with me, would Istar and the Storm God have now subjected him to a small king?' Because he began fighting with me, the gods have subjected him to me by their judgement." (Apol. §10C, III 63-79)

Consequently, Muršili III's reign was seven years. In the subsequent revolt, Hatusilli gathered a considerable force. This included natural allies from his local strongholds of Nerik and Hakpissa, as well as many non-aligned Hittites who were impressed with his record of service to the Hittite Empire. His strategic military victory over Ramesses II of Egypt in the 1274 BC Battle of Kadesh was favourably contrasted with the rather "undistinguished and largely unproven occupant of the throne of Hattusa" – Urhi-Teshub/Muršili III – who had lost Hanigalbat to Assyria in his reign. Hattusili's forces even included elements of the Kaska peoples who were sworn enemies of the Hittites. Hatusilli quickly defeated Muršili III and seized the throne from his nephew; he then succeeded to power as King Hattusili III. After his victory, Hattusili appointed Muršili's brother or brother-in-law, Kurunta, as the vassal king over Tarhuntassa in order to win the latter's loyalty.

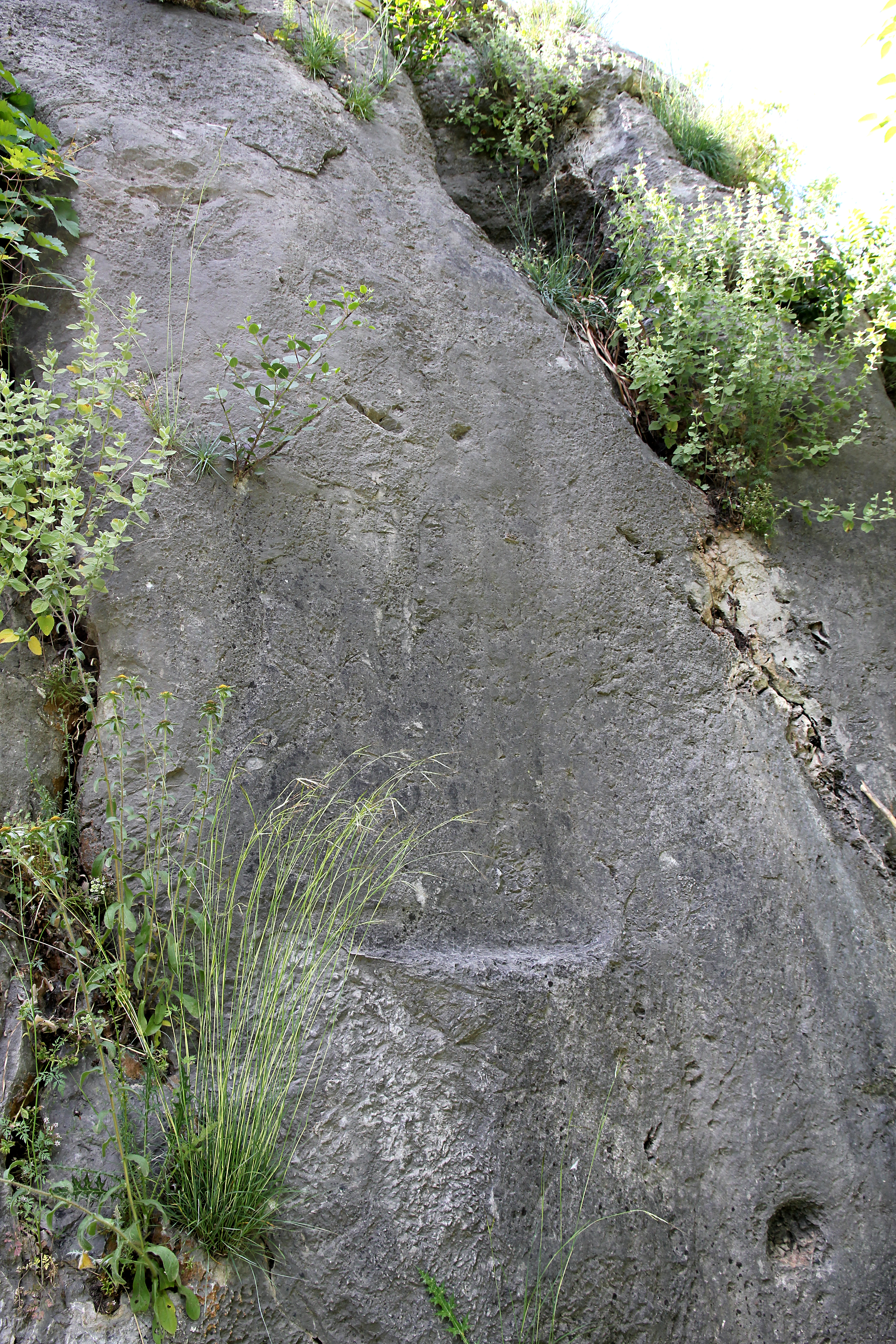
The erased rock relief at Sirkeli Höyük that is believed to be of Muršili III

Located near the village of Sirkeli Höyük, there's a well known relief of Muwatalli II. A second, very similar relief was just a few meters away, but it was largely destroyed in antiquity. The nature of the damage indicates a deliberate destruction, so that the name of this figure could not be read. Nevertheless, it is believed to have been the relief of Muršili III, destroyed by his uncle as an act of Damnatio memoriae (condemnation of memory).

== Exile ==
After being deposed as king, Hattusili III exiled Muršili to Syria. He was initially granted the fiefdom of Nuhašše in Syria, from which he attempted to maintain his claim to the Hittite throne. However, after the failure of his plots to oust his uncle from the throne, Muršili later escaped and fled to Egypt, the land of his country's enemy. Hattusili III responded to this event by demanding that Ramesses II extradite his nephew back to Hatti.

This letter precipitated a crisis in relations between Egypt and Hatti when Ramesses denied any knowledge of Muršili's whereabouts in his country and the two empires came dangerously close to war. However, both kings eventually decided to resolve the issue by making peace in Year 21 of Ramesses II. An extradition clause was also included in the treaty. Muršili III soon thereafter disappears from history after his sojourn in Egypt.

== Family Tree ==
Hittite New Kingdom royal family tree according to Trevor Bryce

Kantuzilli (Note: Scholars have suggested that Tudhaliya I/II was possibly a grandson of the Hittite king Huzziya II; the first Tudhaliya is now known to be the son of Kantuzzili (Bryce 1997, p. 131 suggested Himuili, but the new edition, Bryce 2005, p. 122, indicated Kantuzzili).)
Tudhaliya I/II (Note: Bryce (1997) does not consider it clear whether Tudhaliya I/II was one king or two (p. 133); the link points to Tudhaliya II. Among those who identify distinct kings Tudhaliya I and Tudhaliya II, Freu (2007) has Kantuzzili—his son Tudhaliya I—his son Hattusili II—his son Tudhaliya II (p. 311).)	Nikkalmati (Note: Bryce (1997), p. 139.)
Arnuwanda I	Asmunikal
Hattusili II? (Note: The existence of Hattusili II is doubted by many scholars (Bryce 1997, pp. 153–154; Bryce 2005, p. 141). Among those who accept the existence of Hattusili II, Freu (2007), p. 311, has Tudhaliya I—his son Hattusili II—his son Tudhaliya II.)	Tudhaliya III (Note: Bryce (1997), p. 158.)	Daduhepa (Note: Bryce (1997), p. 172.)	Zida (Note: Bryce (1997), p. 174.)
Tudhaliya the Younger (Note: Bryce (1997), p. 168.)	Henti (1)	Šuppiluliuma I	(2) Tawananna (Note: Also known as Malnigal; daughter of Burnaburias II of Babylonia (Bryce 1997, p. 173).)
Arnuwanda II	Telipinu (Note: ‘Great priest’ in Kizzuwadna and king (lugal) of Aleppo (Bryce 1997, p. 174).)	Sarri-Kusuh (Note: King (lugal) of Carchemish.) (Note: Bryce (1997), pp. 174, 203–204.)	Zannanza (Note: Zannanza died on his way to Egypt to marry a pharaoh's widow, probably Ankhesenpaaten, the widow of Tutankhamun (Bryce 1997, pp. 196–198).)	Gassulawiya (Note: Bryce (1997), p. 227.) (1)	Mursili II	(2) Tanuhepa (Note: Bryce (1997), p. 230.)
Talmi-Sarruma (Note: Bryce (1997), p. 220.)	Sahurunuwa (Note: Bryce (1997), p. 222.)	Muwatalli II	Halpasulupi (Note: Haas (2006), p. 91.)	Massanauzzi (Note: Massanauzzi married Masturi, king of the Seha River Land (Bryce 1997, p. 313).)	Hattusili III (Note: Bryce (1997), p. 296.)	Puduhepa (Note: Puduhepa was the daughter of the Kizzuwadnan priest Pentipsarri (Bryce 1997, p. 273).)
Ini-Tesub (Note: Bryce (1997), pp. 346, 363.)	Urhi-Tesub	Kurunta (Note: King (lugal) of Tarhuntassa (Bryce 1997, p. 296); apparently later Great King of Hatti (Bryce 1997, p. 354).)	Nerikkaili (Note: Nerikkaili married a daughter of Bentesina, king of Amurru (Bryce 1997, p. 294).)	numerous daughters (Note: Two daughters of Hattusili III were married to the pharaoh Ramesses II; one was given the Egyptian name Ma(hor)nefrure. Another, Gassuwaliya, married into the royal house of Amurru. Kilushepa was married to a king of Isuwa. A daughter married into the royal family of Babylon. A sister of Tudhaliya IV married Sausgamuwa, king of Amurru after his father Bentesina. From Bryce (1997), pp. 294 and 312.) and sons (Note: Bryce (1997), p. 332.)	Tudhaliya IV (Note: Bryce (1997), p. 363. Tudhaliya IV probably married a Babylonian princess, known by her title of Great Princess (dumu.sal gal) (Bryce 1997, pp. 294, 331).)
Talmi-Tesub (Note: Bryce (1997), p. 363.)	Arnuwanda III (Note: Bryce (1997), p. 361.)	Suppiluliuma II (Note: Last documented Great King of the Land of Hatti.)
Kuzi-Tesub (Note: King and then Great King of Carchemish (Bryce 1997, pp. 384–385).)

- (1) = 1st spouse
- (2) = 2nd spouse
- Small caps indicates a Great King (LUGAL.GAL) of the Land of Hatti; italic small caps indicates a Great Queen or Tawananna.
- Dashed lines indicate adoption.
- Solid lines indicate marriage (if horizontal) or parentage (if vertical).

References:
- Trevor Bryce (1997). The Kingdom of the Hittites. Oxford, England: Clarendon Press.
- Trevor Bryce (2005). The Kingdom of the Hittites (new edition). Oxford, England: Clarendon Press.
- Trevor Bryce (2012). The World of the Neo-Hittite Kingdoms. Oxford, England: Oxford University Press.
- Jacques Freu (2007). Les débuts du nouvel empire hittite. Paris, France: L'Harmattan.
- Volkert Haas (2006). Die hethitische Literatur. Berlin, Germany: de Gruyter.

== See also ==
- History of the Hittites

== In popular culture ==
The novel "The Lost Valor Of Love" by E.A. Carter includes Urhi-Teshub as a main character.

== Notes ==
Regnal titles
Preceded by Muwatalli II	Hittite king ca. 1282–1275 BC	Succeeded by Hattusili III
