= Muwatalli II =

Hittite king

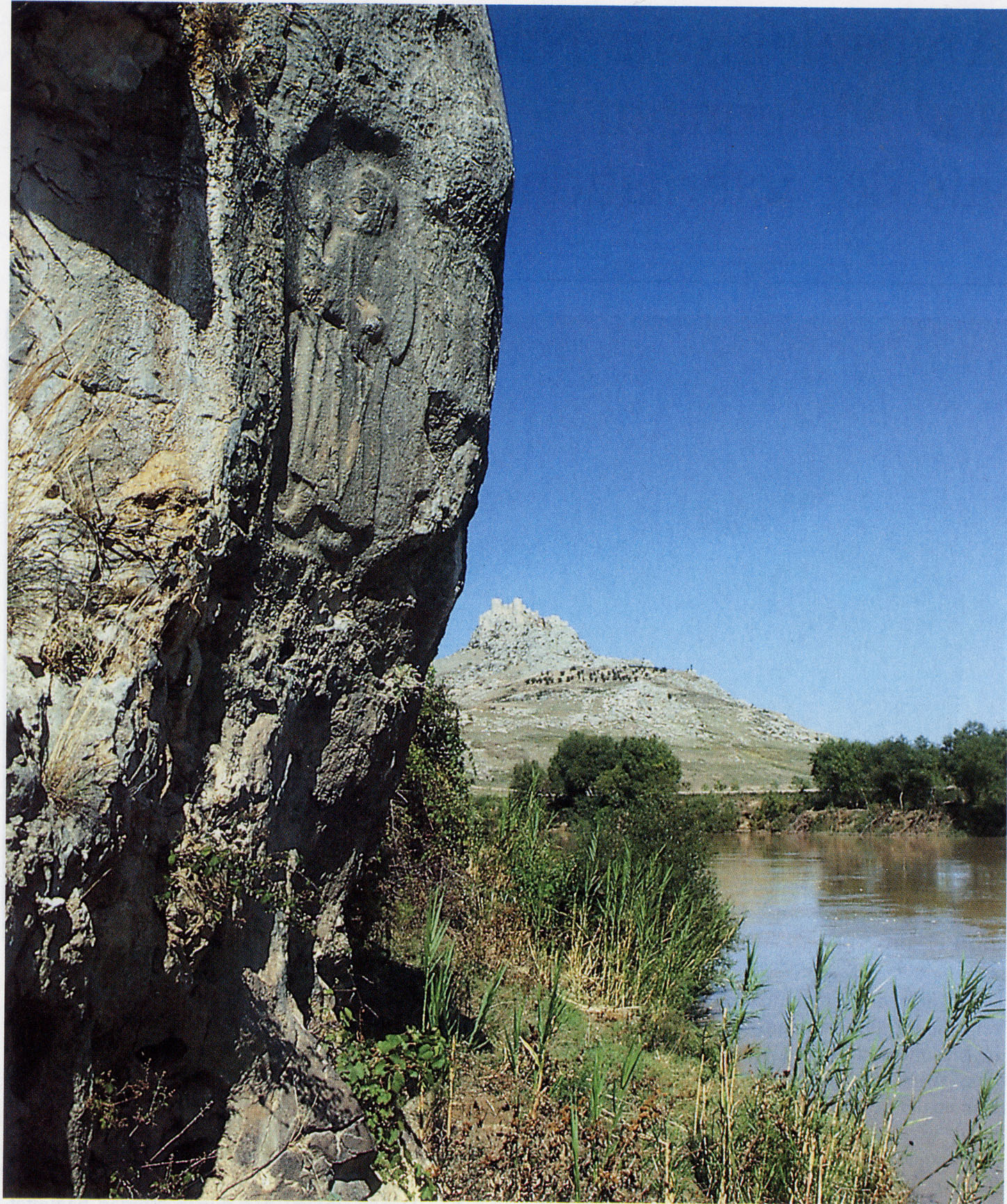
- Depiction of Muwatalli II on a relief at Sirkeli Höyük
- Other name: Muwatallis II
- Title: King of the Hittites
- Predecessor: Mursili II
- Successor: Mursili III
- Spouse: Tanu-Ḫepa
- Children: Mursili III; Ulmi-Teshup
- Parent(s): Mursili II; Queen Gassulawiya
- Relatives: Hattusili III (brother); Tudhaliya IV (nephew); Talmi-Sharruma, King of Aleppo (cousin)

Muwatalli II (also Muwatallis, or Muwatallish; meaning "mighty") was a king of the New Kingdom of the Hittite empire c. 1295–1272 (middle chronology).

== Early life and family ==
He was the eldest son of Mursili II and Queen Gassulawiya, and he had several siblings.

Muwatalli had a wife named Tanu-Ḫepa and at least two children. One was Urhi-Teshup, who became king as Mursili III until his uncle Hattusili III deposed him. Another was Kurunta who became the vassal ruler of Tarhuntassa during the reign of Hattusili III. Another person named Ulmi-Teshup is suggested to be a third son of Muwatalli II, but it is quite likely that Ulmi-Teshup and Kurunta are the same person.

Hattusili III was the younger brother of Muwatalli II. Tudhaliya IV and Egyptian Queen Maathorneferure were the nephew and niece of Muwatalli. Muwatalli's namesake, Muwatalli I, was a pre-Empire king of the early 14th century, the predecessor of Tudhaliya I.

== Reign ==
He is best known for relocating the Hittite capital to Tarhuntassa, appointing his brother Hattusili as governor in Hattusa, and fighting Ramesses II in the Battle of Kadesh.

Egyptologists suspect that some time prior to Ramesses II's accession to the Egyptian throne, Muwattalli had reached an informal peace treaty or understanding with Seti I over Kadesh to avoid a clash between the two powers over control of Syria. In it, Seti effectively ceded Kadesh to the Hittite king in order to focus on domestic issues in Egypt.

=== Asia Minor ===
In Western Anatolia (Asia Minor), Muwatalli entered the Treaty of Muwattalli II and Alakšandu of Wiluša (CTH 76).

=== Move to Tarhuntassa ===
At the start of Muwatalli II's reign the capital of Hatti was Hattusa, located in the northern region of Anatolia. Not long after he came into power, he made the decision to move the capital to a new location, which he named Tarhuntassa. There is no documentation stating the reason why the capital was moved, but scholars, based on later texts written by his brother Hattusili III and the campaigns Muwatalli II fought, have come up with two possible reasons.

The first theory is that Muwatlli II moved the capital because of the border skirmishes between the Hittites and the Kaska, and later the rebellion by Piyamaradu. These disputes were on the northern border, and the capital of Hattusa is located near the northern border. After stabilizing the northern border, he moved the capital further south, to the new location of Tarhuntassa. This new location was not only further away from the troublesome northern border, but it was also strategically better for the upcoming fight against Egypt over Syria.

The second theory of why Muwatalli II moved his capital south is for religious reasons. Itamar Singer, in his essay "The Failed Reforms of Akhenaten and Muwatalli", states that the reason for the move had deeper roots in a religious reform, although he does acknowledge the political advantages of the move. The main evidence for this is how the depiction of the Storm God on his royal seals changes significantly after the expulsion of Danuhepa. Muwatalli II introduces a new motif for seals that is followed by all the Hittite kings that rule after him: the Umarmungsszene (German) (the protective embrace of the deity). This style is identifiable because it shows the king being embraced by one (or more) gods. In Muwatalli II's seals, he is being embraced by the Storm God of Lightning (Pihassassa) instead of the traditional Storm God of Heaven (Teshub).

This move would eventually lead to a bitter civil war after Muwatalli's death.

=== Sirkeli relief ===
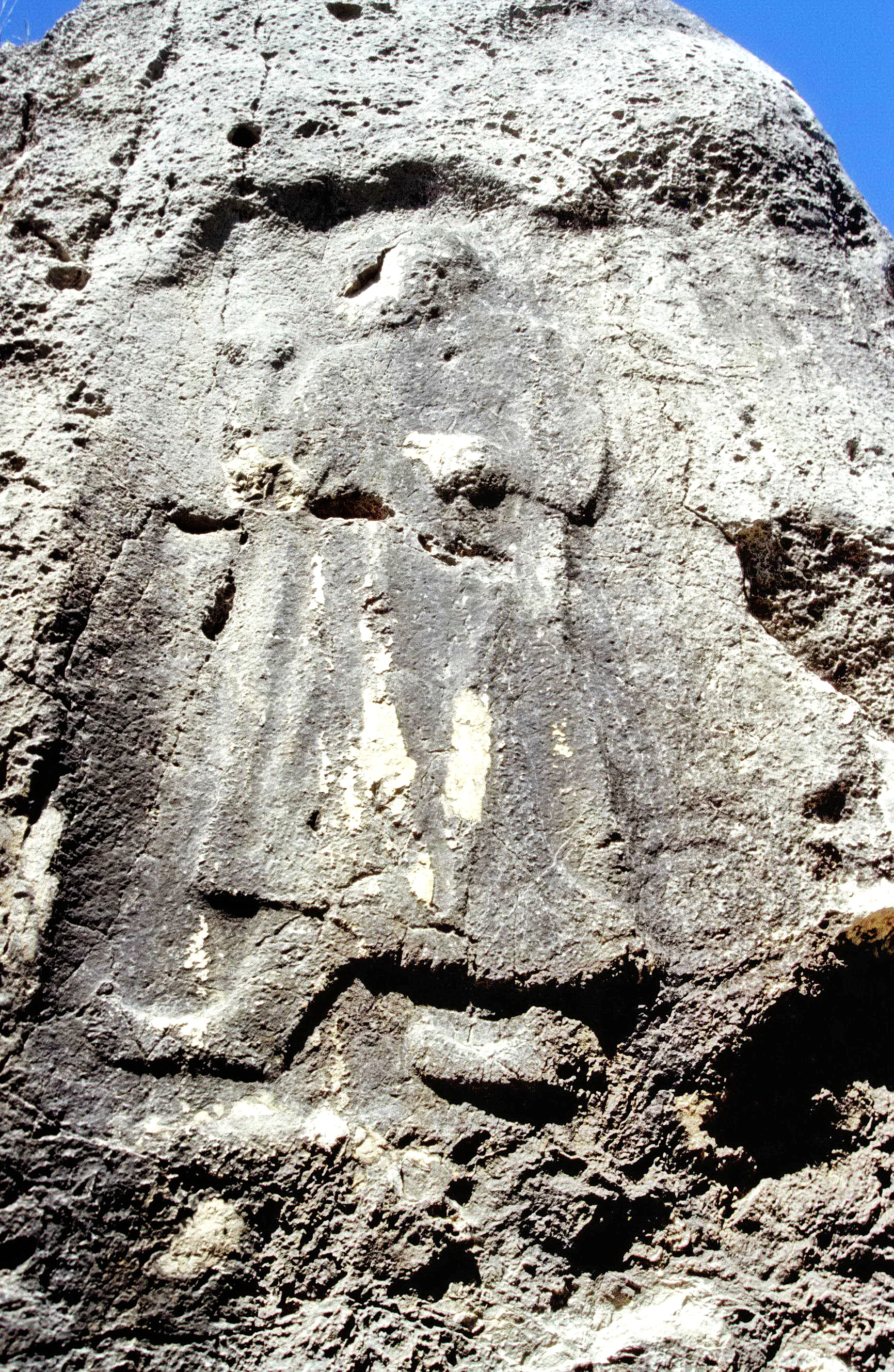
On the west bank of the Ceyhan river near the village of Sirkeli (Sirkeli Höyük), a late Hittite rock relief reminds of the presence of the Hittites in the Çukurova (Cilician Plain). It shows the Hittite Great King Muwatalli II (1290–1272 BC).

The relief of Muwatalli II is located near Sirkeli Höyük, which is one of the largest settlement mounds in Plain Cilicia. The settlement is situated on the left bank of the Ceyhan River, known in ancient times as Puruna or Pyramos.

The inscription of the king mentions also the name of his father Mursili II: "Muwattalli, Great King, the Hero, son of Mursili, Great King, the Hero". He wears a long robe and, in his left hand, he holds the kalmus (lituus). The appearance of King Muwattalli is consistent with the way the Sun God of Heaven (Nepisas Istanu, or Simige) was portrayed in Hittite iconography; so this indicates deification.

A second, very similar relief is a few meters away, but it was partially destroyed in antiquity. The nature of the damage indicates a deliberate destruction, so that the name of this figure could not be read.

This figure is probably Urḫi-Teššup, whose throne name was Muršili (III). He became the king of Hatti after the death of his father Muwatalli II, but was overthrown 7 years later by his uncle Hattušili III.

These reliefs were probably directly visible to the people entering the ancient town, and dominated the landscape. But because the course of the river kept changing over the centuries, currently the reliefs are not so easily visible to visitors.

During the Hittite period, Sirkeli Höyük may have been the cult town of Kummanni.

=== Battle of Kadesh ===
==== Overview ====
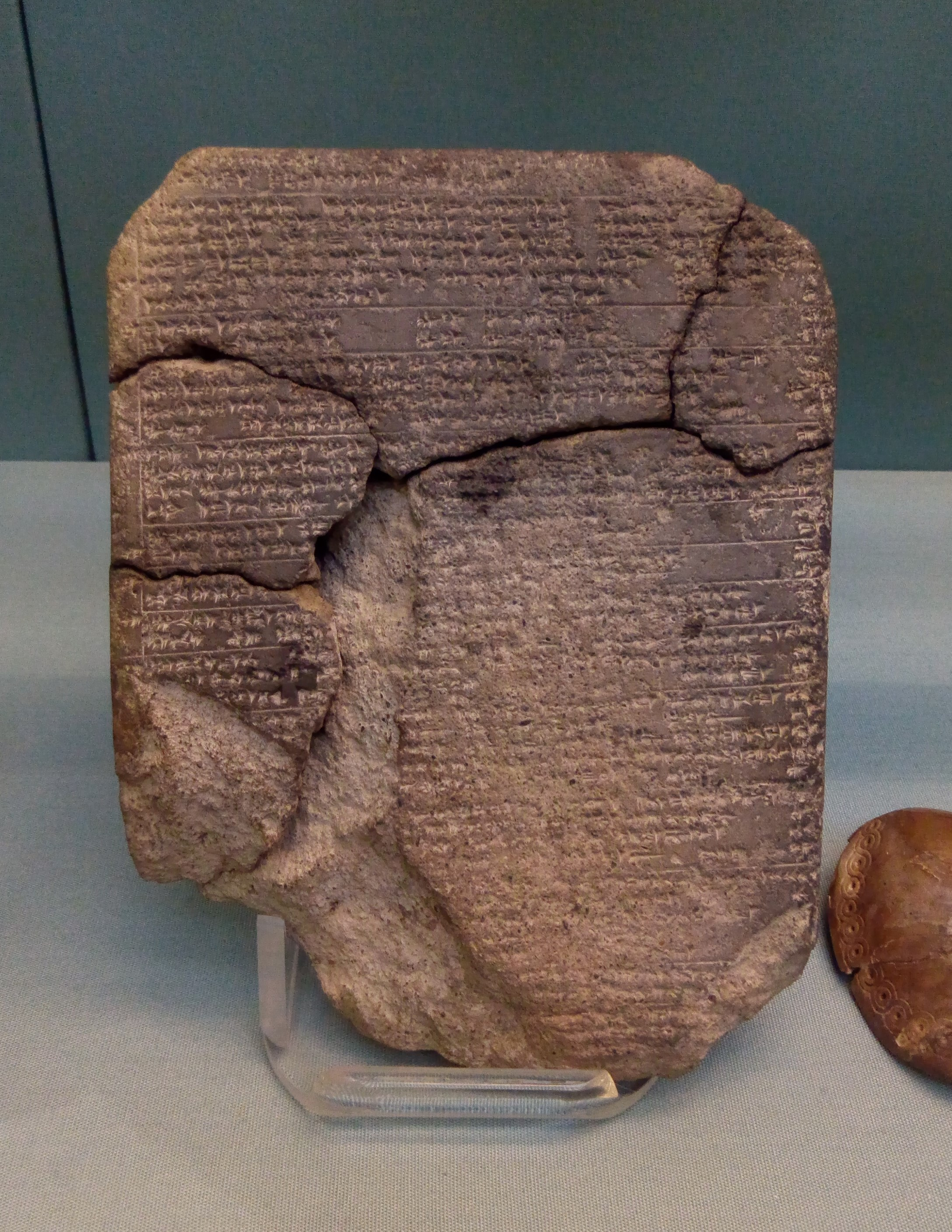
The Aleppo Treaty: treaty between Muwattalli II king of Hatti, and Talmi-Sharruma king of Aleppo, written in Akkadian. Found in Bogazkoy, ancient Hattusa, dated c. 1300 BC. British Museum.

Muwatalli II is best known as the Hittite ruler who fought Ramesses II to a standstill at the Battle of Kadesh. Among his allies was Talmi-Sharruma, grandson of Suppiluliumas I, who was the king of Aleppo.

Although both sides claimed victory in this war, scholars generally believe that the battle ended badly for both sides, especially Ramesses II. This is because both sides suffered heavy losses and their military strength was reduced. What makes this battle unique is not how it ended, but that out of all the battles that Ramses II fought during his reign, he gave special attention to this battle. This is evident by the fact that he produced two official versions of the battle: the Literary Record, sometimes referred to as the Poem, and the Pictorial Record, which includes the Bulletin, a short record of the battle and carved images. These two depictions of the battle are found inscribed in five different Egyptian temples, including the Ramesseum. The second thing that makes this battle noteworthy is the tactics that Muwatalli II used against the Egyptian Army.

The general outline of the battle is this: Muwatlli II gathered his troops in northern Syria and sent out scouts and spies to ascertain the location of Ramesses II army. The spies reached Ramesses II and the division of Amun, when he was first approaching Kadesh. The spies, pretending to be deserters, gained the ear of Ramses II. They used this to convince him that the Hittite army was over hundred miles away in Aleppo. Sometime later, other Hittite scouts were caught, and Ramesses II discovered the ruse: Muwatalli II was right outside of Kadesh with his forces.

The battle began when the Hittite forces attacked the Egyptian army that was marching towards Kadesh. Ramses II, at his camp in Kadesh, had gone ahead of his other divisions and only had one division of his army with him. While the division to the south of Ramses II was being attacked by one attachment of Hittite charioteers, Muwatalli II had sent a second division of charioteers to attack Ramses II camp. Ramses II forces managed to fend off the Hittite attack and "win" the battle on the following day.

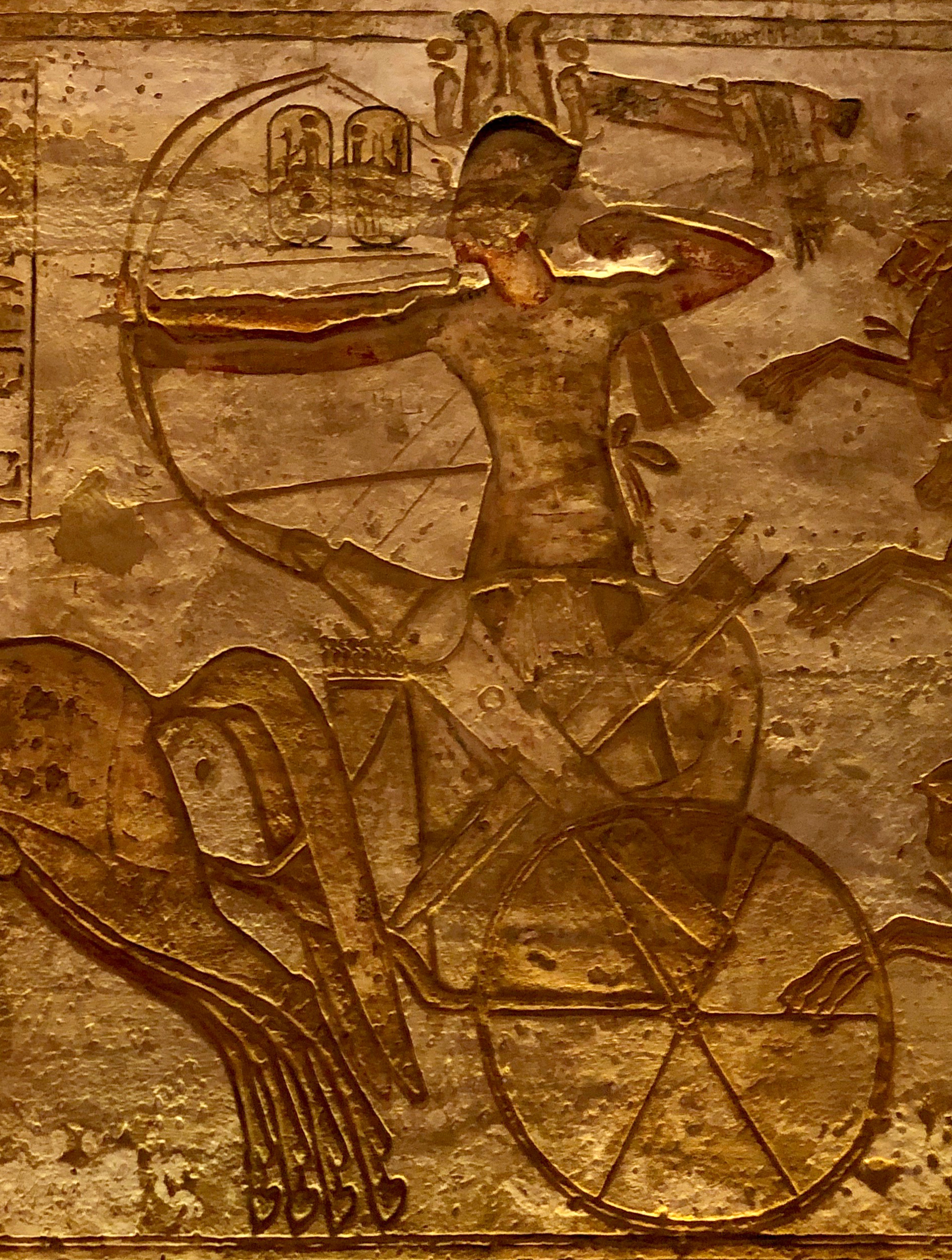
One of the carvings showing Ramesses II at the Battle of Kadesh

==== Egyptian account ====
The two accounts that Ramses II created of the battle depict it as an epic struggle against the Hittite army, where Ramses II shows off his prowess as a brilliant military leader. In the shorter Bulletin, Muwatalli II is frequently described as "the vile Chief of Khatti." Ramses II admits to having heard the false reports of Muwatalli II's whereabouts, but when he discovers where Muwatalli II's forces really are, he claims that "His majesty slaughtered them in their places; they sprawled before his horses; and his majesty was alone, no other was with him." In the longer Poem, Ramesses II again calls Muwatalli II the "vile foe of Khatti" but in this version he also depicts Muwatalli II as being afraid of him, saying "the vile Chief of Khattii stood in the midst of the army that was with him and did not come out to fight for fear of his majesty" and "the wretched Chief of Khatti stood among his troops and chariots... stood turning, shrinking, afraid." The Poem and Bulletin both end with Ramesses II winning a stunning victory over Muwatalli II and the Poem ends with Muwatalli signing a peace treaty with Ramesses II out of fear.

Despite the enthusiastic depiction of the battle by Ramesses II, scholars have concluded that the battle was a disaster for Ramesses II. This is because after the battle, Muwatalli II continued to expand into Syria and the Egyptian expansion was stopped in the area of Palestine.

== Attestations ==
Muwatalli II is known from several texts.

- CTH 75 Treaty of Muwattalli II with Talmi-Šarrumma of Aleppo
- CTH 76 Treaty of Muwattalli II with Alakšandu of Wiluša
- CTH 79 Memorandum to Muršili III.
- CTH 381 Prayer of Muwattalli II to the Assembly of Gods
- CTH 382 Prayer of Muwattalli II to the weather god of Kummanni

== Family tree ==
Hittite New Kingdom royal family tree according to Trevor Bryce

Kantuzilli (Note: Scholars have suggested that Tudhaliya I/II was possibly a grandson of the Hittite king Huzziya II; the first Tudhaliya is now known to be the son of Kantuzzili (Bryce 1997, p. 131 suggested Himuili, but the new edition, Bryce 2005, p. 122, indicated Kantuzzili).)
Tudhaliya I/II (Note: Bryce (1997) does not consider it clear whether Tudhaliya I/II was one king or two (p. 133); the link points to Tudhaliya II. Among those who identify distinct kings Tudhaliya I and Tudhaliya II, Freu (2007) has Kantuzzili—his son Tudhaliya I—his son Hattusili II—his son Tudhaliya II (p. 311).)	Nikkalmati (Note: Bryce (1997), p. 139.)
Arnuwanda I	Asmunikal
Hattusili II? (Note: The existence of Hattusili II is doubted by many scholars (Bryce 1997, pp. 153–154; Bryce 2005, p. 141). Among those who accept the existence of Hattusili II, Freu (2007), p. 311, has Tudhaliya I—his son Hattusili II—his son Tudhaliya II.)	Tudhaliya III (Note: Bryce (1997), p. 158.)	Daduhepa (Note: Bryce (1997), p. 172.)	Zida (Note: Bryce (1997), p. 174.)
Tudhaliya the Younger (Note: Bryce (1997), p. 168.)	Henti (1)	Šuppiluliuma I	(2) Tawananna (Note: Also known as Malnigal; daughter of Burnaburias II of Babylonia (Bryce 1997, p. 173).)
Arnuwanda II	Telipinu (Note: ‘Great priest’ in Kizzuwadna and king (lugal) of Aleppo (Bryce 1997, p. 174).)	Sarri-Kusuh (Note: King (lugal) of Carchemish.) (Note: Bryce (1997), pp. 174, 203–204.)	Zannanza (Note: Zannanza died on his way to Egypt to marry a pharaoh's widow, probably Ankhesenpaaten, the widow of Tutankhamun (Bryce 1997, pp. 196–198).)	Gassulawiya (Note: Bryce (1997), p. 227.) (1)	Mursili II	(2) Tanuhepa (Note: Bryce (1997), p. 230.)
Talmi-Sarruma (Note: Bryce (1997), p. 220.)	Sahurunuwa (Note: Bryce (1997), p. 222.)	Muwatalli II	Halpasulupi (Note: Haas (2006), p. 91.)	Massanauzzi (Note: Massanauzzi married Masturi, king of the Seha River Land (Bryce 1997, p. 313).)	Hattusili III (Note: Bryce (1997), p. 296.)	Puduhepa (Note: Puduhepa was the daughter of the Kizzuwadnan priest Pentipsarri (Bryce 1997, p. 273).)
Ini-Tesub (Note: Bryce (1997), pp. 346, 363.)	Urhi-Tesub	Kurunta (Note: King (lugal) of Tarhuntassa (Bryce 1997, p. 296); apparently later Great King of Hatti (Bryce 1997, p. 354).)	Nerikkaili (Note: Nerikkaili married a daughter of Bentesina, king of Amurru (Bryce 1997, p. 294).)	numerous daughters (Note: Two daughters of Hattusili III were married to the pharaoh Ramesses II; one was given the Egyptian name Ma(hor)nefrure. Another, Gassuwaliya, married into the royal house of Amurru. Kilushepa was married to a king of Isuwa. A daughter married into the royal family of Babylon. A sister of Tudhaliya IV married Sausgamuwa, king of Amurru after his father Bentesina. From Bryce (1997), pp. 294 and 312.) and sons (Note: Bryce (1997), p. 332.)	Tudhaliya IV (Note: Bryce (1997), p. 363. Tudhaliya IV probably married a Babylonian princess, known by her title of Great Princess (dumu.sal gal) (Bryce 1997, pp. 294, 331).)
Talmi-Tesub (Note: Bryce (1997), p. 363.)	Arnuwanda III (Note: Bryce (1997), p. 361.)	Suppiluliuma II (Note: Last documented Great King of the Land of Hatti.)
Kuzi-Tesub (Note: King and then Great King of Carchemish (Bryce 1997, pp. 384–385).)

- (1) = 1st spouse
- (2) = 2nd spouse
- Small caps indicates a Great King (LUGAL.GAL) of the Land of Hatti; italic small caps indicates a Great Queen or Tawananna.
- Dashed lines indicate adoption.
- Solid lines indicate marriage (if horizontal) or parentage (if vertical).

References:
- Trevor Bryce (1997). The Kingdom of the Hittites. Oxford, England: Clarendon Press.
- Trevor Bryce (2005). The Kingdom of the Hittites (new edition). Oxford, England: Clarendon Press.
- Trevor Bryce (2012). The World of the Neo-Hittite Kingdoms. Oxford, England: Oxford University Press.
- Jacques Freu (2007). Les débuts du nouvel empire hittite. Paris, France: L'Harmattan.
- Volkert Haas (2006). Die hethitische Literatur. Berlin, Germany: de Gruyter.

== See also ==
- History of the Hittites

== Notes ==
Regnal titles
Preceded by Mursili II	Hittite king c. 1295–1282 BC	Succeeded by Mursili III
