= Hattusa Bronze Tablet =

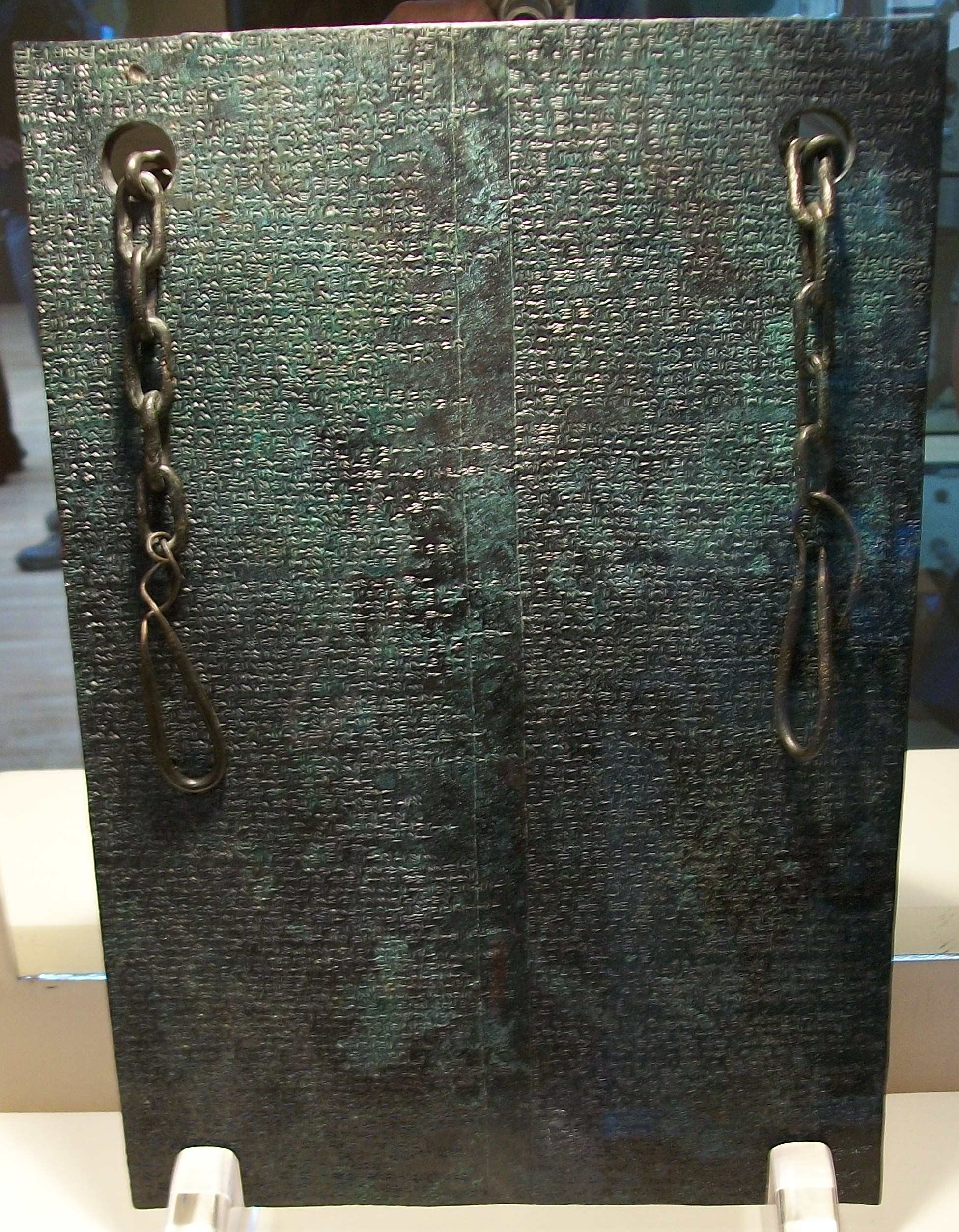
Photograph of the tablet

The Hattusa Bronze Tablet, also known as the Kurunta Treaty, (Bo 86/299) is a bronze tablet with a Hittite language cuneiform inscription dating to the Bronze Age and setting forth a vassal treaty between Hittite King Tudhaliya IV and his cousin, King Kurunta of Tarhuntassa. While thousands of Hittite clay tablets have been unearthed, the Hattusa Bronze Tablet is the only Hittite metal tablet discovered so far. It was discovered near the Sphinx Gate of the Hittite capital Hattusa (modern day Bogazköy, Turkey). The tablet is housed at the Museum of Anatolian Civilizations in Ankara.

The text includes a detailed description of the boundaries of the kingdom of Tarhuntassa. For that reason, the tablet is an important source for Anatolian geography in the Bronze Age.

The tablet is one of only three Hittite diplomatic documents so far discovered that are believed to be originals, rather than archival copies or drafts. According to the tablet, it was written by a scribe named Ḫalwaziti.

Analysis of the tablet showed that it consists of bronze with a very high tin content. The use of tin-heavy bronze may have been deliberate, in order to create a "light silverish color and sheen."
