= Puduḫepa =

- Queen of the Hittites
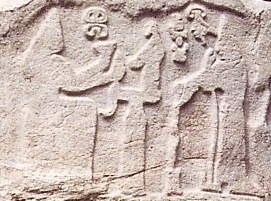
- The figure on the right is Queen Puduḫepa
- Spouse: King Hattusili III
- Issue: Tudhaliya IV; Maathorneferure; Kiluš-Ḫepa
- Father: Bentepsharri

Puduḫepa or Pudu-Kheba (fl. 13th century BC) was a Hittite queen, married to the King Hattusili III. She has been referred to as "one of the most influential women known from the Ancient Near East."

== Biography ==
=== Early life and marriage ===
Puduḫepa was born at the beginning of the 13th century BC in the city of Lawazantiya in Kizzuwatna (i.e. Cilicia, a region south of the Hittite kingdom). Her father Bentepsharri was the head priest of the tutelary divinity of the city, Shaushka (identified with the Mesopotamian Ishtar), and Puduḫepa grew up to exercise the function of priestess of this same goddess. Puduḫepa’s own tutelary goddess was Ḫepat, and her theophoric name served as an outward sign of her devotion to the goddess. Later, in Hittite religion, she identified the Sun goddess of Arinna with Ḫepat.

On his return from the Battle of Kadesh, the Hittite general Hattusili met Puduḫepa and, it was said, Ishtar instructed him to find in her love and companionship, decreeing that they would enjoy the 'love of being a spouse to each other.' She accompanied him then to the kingdom of Hapissa. For Puduḫepa it was an advantageous match. Although Hattusili was most likely much older than her and already had numerous lovers and concubines, Puduḫepa became first among them all. When her spouse successfully rose to the Hittite throne by defeating his nephew Mursili III in a civil war instigated by Hattusili around 1286 BC, Puduḫepa ascended the throne with him, becoming tawananna, or queen.

Her marital status can be gleaned from her own account in a letter she wrote to Ramses II, in which she proudly extolled her fertility and virtuous qualities:

(It was) my personal deity who did it. And when the Sun Goddess of Arinna (together with) the Storm God, Ḫebat, and Šauška made me Queen, she joined me with your brother, and I produced sons and daughters, so that the people of Ḫatti often speak of my experience and capacity for nurture. You, my brother, know this. Furthermore, when I entered the royal household, the princesses I found in the household also gave birth under my care. I raised them (i.e., their children), and I also raised those whom I found already born. I made them military officers—may my personal deity…! And may the gods likewise endow the daughter whom I will give to my brother with the Queen’s experience and capacity for nurture!

=== Reign ===
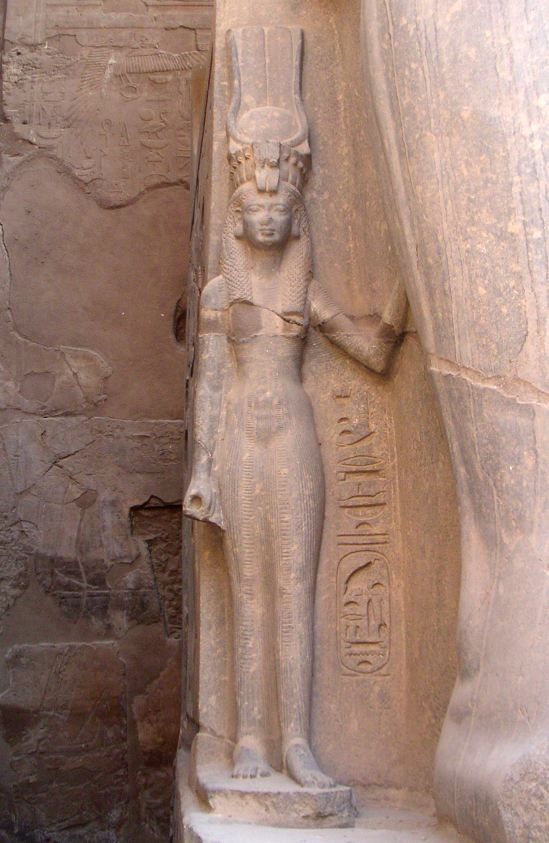
Nefertari (depicted here at Luxor) sent gifts to Puduḫepa.

Hattusili III was physically weak and frequently ill, and during the early years of his reign, he encountered numerous setbacks. In foreign affairs, many great powers did not recognize him as a sovereign ruler; domestically, the former Hittite king Urhi‑Teshub was still at large. Although Hattusili III denigrated Urhi‑Teshub as a bastard, and the distinction in succession rights between the chief wife’s sons and the concubines’ sons was as sharply defined as that between a son and a son‑in‑law, in the absence of a chief wife’s son, the succession rights of a concubine’s son were entirely legitimate. Hattusili III’s claims, therefore, represent a serious distortion of the facts.

Therefore, Puduḫepa’s assistance was crucial for Hattusili, and she played an important role in both the Hittite court and international diplomacy of the period. From the early years of their marriage, she seems to have been involved in judicial affairs. This is evidenced by a long-standing legal case in which she was jointly involved with her husband, concerning Hattusili III’s relative, Arma‑Tarhunda. After becoming queen, she would appear constantly by the side of her husband as he made his rulings and decisions. It appears, however, that she was portrayed reigning hand in hand with her spouse rather than subservient to the king. Puduḫepa had the use of her own seal, controlled the domestic arrangements of the royal palaces, and judged court cases. Blending religion and politics, she reorganized the vast pantheon of Hittite deities.

From the royal palace in the newly rebuilt capital city of Hattusa, Puduḫepa used her sons and daughters to ensure Hittite ascendancy and to cement alliances. This was a role that had never been performed by a Hittite queen before.

She played an important role in diplomacy with Ancient Egypt. Extensive correspondence bearing Puduḫepa's seal survives, communicating several times with the king of Egypt Ramesses II as he signed a peace treaty with Hattusili, in which Hattusili agrees that two of his daughters should go to Egypt to marry Ramesses.

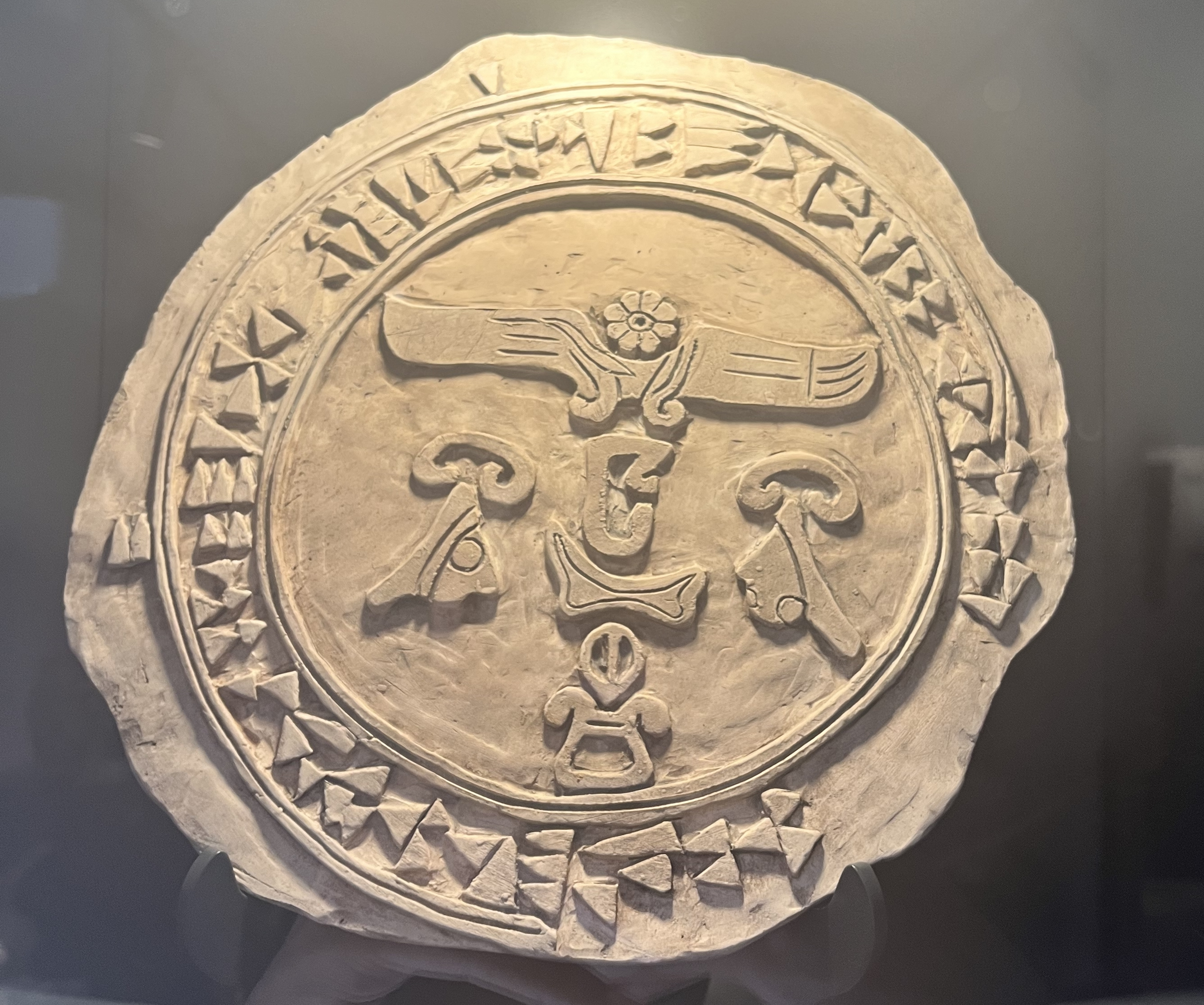
Seal of Puduhepa

A diplomatic marriage between King Kadashman-Enlil II of Babylonia may have been in the offing with Puduḫepa matchmaking Kadashman-Enlil's betrothal to one of her daughters.

A princess of Babylon was married into the Hittite royal family. This would have been a daughter or sister of King Kudur-Enlil and the news elicited contempt from Ramesses II, who apparently no longer regarded Babylon as politically significant. Puduḫepa replied in a letter, ‘If you say "The king of Babylon is not a Great King," then you do not know the status of Babylon.’

After the death of Hattusili, the role of Puduḫepa expanded at least during the early reign of her son Tudhaliya IV, under the title of goddess-queen. She was involved in judicial matters to the point of intervening in legal cases. She was also a priestess who worked on organising and rationalising Hittite religion.

Her daughters were Queen Maathorneferure of Egypt and Princess Kiluš-Ḫepa, who was also the queen of Isuwa, a Hittite vassal state.

=== Later Years ===
During her son’s reign, Puduḫepa still held an important position, at least in the early period. However, during this time she experienced a political coup that ultimately led to her being expelled from the palace by her daughter-in-law. Some scholars, however, suggest that she may have later been reinstated to her original position and possibly retained her influence, since the Babylonian wife of Tudhaliya IV ultimately seems not to have achieved the power she sought. To date, none of the seals of Tudhaliya IV make any mention of his wife. It is also possible, however, that she was discarded once she had served her purpose. Puduḫepa may have lived to the ripe old age of ninety, though it is also possible that she did not survive beyond seventy-five or eighty.

=== Nefertari and Puduḫepa ===
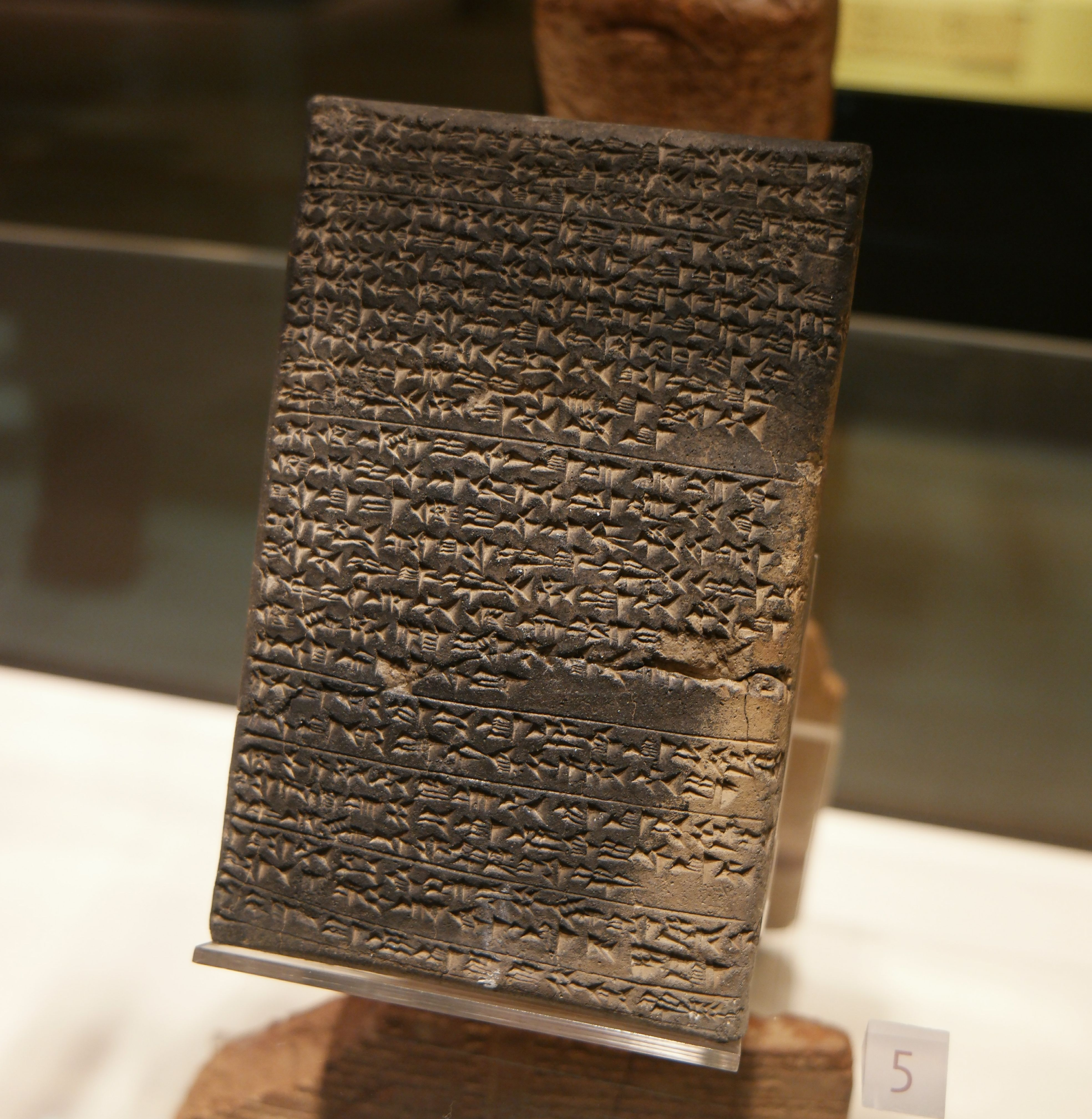
Letter of Friendship written in Akkadian by Naptera, the wife of Ramses II, the king of Egypt, to Puduhepa, the wife of Hattusili III, the King of Hittites, between the years of 1275-1250 BCE

Queen Nefertari of Egypt sent gifts to Puduḫepa:

So (says) Naptera, the Great Queen of the Land of Egypt, to Puduhepa, the Great Queen of the land of Hatti, say (as follows): For me, your sister all is well and my country is well. For you, my sister, may all be well and may your land be well. I have now heard that you, my sister, have written to me to enquire about my well-being, and that you have written me about the relationship of good peace and good brotherhood in which the Great King, the King of the Land of Egypt, (now stands) with the Great King, the King of the Land of Hatti, his brother. May the Sun God and the Storm God exalt you and may the Sun God cause peace to flourish and bestow good brotherhood on the Great King, the King of the Land of Egypt, and the Great King, the King of the Land of Hatti, his brother forever. And I also am at peace and am sisterly with you, my sister, as well. Now, I have sent to you a present as a greetings-gift for you, my sister, that I have sent in the hands of Parikhnawa, the royal messenger: 1 (necklace) for the neck, multicolored, made of fine gold consisting of 12 strands, which weighs 88 shekels. 1 colorful cloak made from royal fabric. 1 colorful tunic made from royal fabric. 5 colorful garments of excellent quality. 5 colorful tunics of excellent quality. Total: 12 garments.

In ancient Egyptian history, there were not many queens who personally took part in diplomatic and political affairs. However, according to the surviving Hittite archives from Boğazköy, it is evident that Egyptian queens could indeed exert influence beyond Egypt, demonstrating their status through correspondence with foreign royal families. These archives preserve a total of eight letters sent by three Egyptian queens, two of whom were well known to Puduḫepa: Nefertari and Tuya. In the Boğazköy archives, Nefertari’s name appears in Akkadian as Naptera, an Akkadian transcription of her name. She sent a total of five letters—the largest number among all Egyptian queens engaged in diplomatic activity. According to the existing evidence, she addressed two letters independently to the Hittite queen Puduḫepa, and three jointly with her husband to the Hittite royal couple.

Apart from matters related to the Egyptian–Hittite peace treaty, the primary role played by Nefertari and Tuya in diplomatic affairs is generally regarded as the exchange of gifts. It is widely acknowledged that one of the crucial elements in diplomatic relations was trade; however, royal gift exchange differed from ordinary “trade goods” in its nature. Although it may be understood as a form of trade between monarchs, its circulation was restricted exclusively to the royal sphere. The origin and destination of such items lay within royal estates. Nefertari and Tuya possessed numerous independent estates that provided them with a continuous flow of wealth, enabling them to participate directly in international exchange by offering products from their own domains.

From the essential role they played in diplomacy, it is evident that—even though the surviving evidence is limited (only five letters sent by Nefertari to the Hittites, two by Tuya, and one reply received)—they did in fact participate consistently in international affairs. In Nefertari’s case in particular, there is evidence indicating that as early as the beginning of Ramesses II’s reign she was already receiving gifts from the Aegean. This means that her involvement in international affairs spanned more than twenty years, and further suggests that the relationship between Puduḫepa and Nefertari may have been far deeper than modern scholarship can fully ascertain.

Hittite New Kingdom royal family tree according to Trevor Bryce

Kantuzilli (Note: Scholars have suggested that Tudhaliya I/II was possibly a grandson of the Hittite king Huzziya II; the first Tudhaliya is now known to be the son of Kantuzzili (Bryce 1997, p. 131 suggested Himuili, but the new edition, Bryce 2005, p. 122, indicated Kantuzzili).)
Tudhaliya I/II (Note: Bryce (1997) does not consider it clear whether Tudhaliya I/II was one king or two (p. 133); the link points to Tudhaliya II. Among those who identify distinct kings Tudhaliya I and Tudhaliya II, Freu (2007) has Kantuzzili—his son Tudhaliya I—his son Hattusili II—his son Tudhaliya II (p. 311).)	Nikkalmati (Note: Bryce (1997), p. 139.)
Arnuwanda I	Asmunikal
Hattusili II? (Note: The existence of Hattusili II is doubted by many scholars (Bryce 1997, pp. 153–154; Bryce 2005, p. 141). Among those who accept the existence of Hattusili II, Freu (2007), p. 311, has Tudhaliya I—his son Hattusili II—his son Tudhaliya II.)	Tudhaliya III (Note: Bryce (1997), p. 158.)	Daduhepa (Note: Bryce (1997), p. 172.)	Zida (Note: Bryce (1997), p. 174.)
Tudhaliya the Younger (Note: Bryce (1997), p. 168.)	Henti (1)	Šuppiluliuma I	(2) Tawananna (Note: Also known as Malnigal; daughter of Burnaburias II of Babylonia (Bryce 1997, p. 173).)
Arnuwanda II	Telipinu (Note: ‘Great priest’ in Kizzuwadna and king (lugal) of Aleppo (Bryce 1997, p. 174).)	Sarri-Kusuh (Note: King (lugal) of Carchemish.) (Note: Bryce (1997), pp. 174, 203–204.)	Zannanza (Note: Zannanza died on his way to Egypt to marry a pharaoh's widow, probably Ankhesenpaaten, the widow of Tutankhamun (Bryce 1997, pp. 196–198).)	Gassulawiya (Note: Bryce (1997), p. 227.) (1)	Mursili II	(2) Tanuhepa (Note: Bryce (1997), p. 230.)
Talmi-Sarruma (Note: Bryce (1997), p. 220.)	Sahurunuwa (Note: Bryce (1997), p. 222.)	Muwatalli II	Halpasulupi (Note: Haas (2006), p. 91.)	Massanauzzi (Note: Massanauzzi married Masturi, king of the Seha River Land (Bryce 1997, p. 313).)	Hattusili III (Note: Bryce (1997), p. 296.)	Puduhepa (Note: Puduhepa was the daughter of the Kizzuwadnan priest Pentipsarri (Bryce 1997, p. 273).)
Ini-Tesub (Note: Bryce (1997), pp. 346, 363.)	Urhi-Tesub	Kurunta (Note: King (lugal) of Tarhuntassa (Bryce 1997, p. 296); apparently later Great King of Hatti (Bryce 1997, p. 354).)	Nerikkaili (Note: Nerikkaili married a daughter of Bentesina, king of Amurru (Bryce 1997, p. 294).)	numerous daughters (Note: Two daughters of Hattusili III were married to the pharaoh Ramesses II; one was given the Egyptian name Ma(hor)nefrure. Another, Gassuwaliya, married into the royal house of Amurru. Kilushepa was married to a king of Isuwa. A daughter married into the royal family of Babylon. A sister of Tudhaliya IV married Sausgamuwa, king of Amurru after his father Bentesina. From Bryce (1997), pp. 294 and 312.) and sons (Note: Bryce (1997), p. 332.)	Tudhaliya IV (Note: Bryce (1997), p. 363. Tudhaliya IV probably married a Babylonian princess, known by her title of Great Princess (dumu.sal gal) (Bryce 1997, pp. 294, 331).)
Talmi-Tesub (Note: Bryce (1997), p. 363.)	Arnuwanda III (Note: Bryce (1997), p. 361.)	Suppiluliuma II (Note: Last documented Great King of the Land of Hatti.)
Kuzi-Tesub (Note: King and then Great King of Carchemish (Bryce 1997, pp. 384–385).)

- (1) = 1st spouse
- (2) = 2nd spouse
- Small caps indicates a Great King (LUGAL.GAL) of the Land of Hatti; italic small caps indicates a Great Queen or Tawananna.
- Dashed lines indicate adoption.
- Solid lines indicate marriage (if horizontal) or parentage (if vertical).

References:
- Trevor Bryce (1997). The Kingdom of the Hittites. Oxford, England: Clarendon Press.
- Trevor Bryce (2005). The Kingdom of the Hittites (new edition). Oxford, England: Clarendon Press.
- Trevor Bryce (2012). The World of the Neo-Hittite Kingdoms. Oxford, England: Oxford University Press.
- Jacques Freu (2007). Les débuts du nouvel empire hittite. Paris, France: L'Harmattan.
- Volkert Haas (2006). Die hethitische Literatur. Berlin, Germany: de Gruyter.

== See also ==
- Nineteenth Dynasty of Egypt family tree
- Arnuwanda III, grandson of Puduḫepa
