= Tudḫaliya IV =

- Labarna
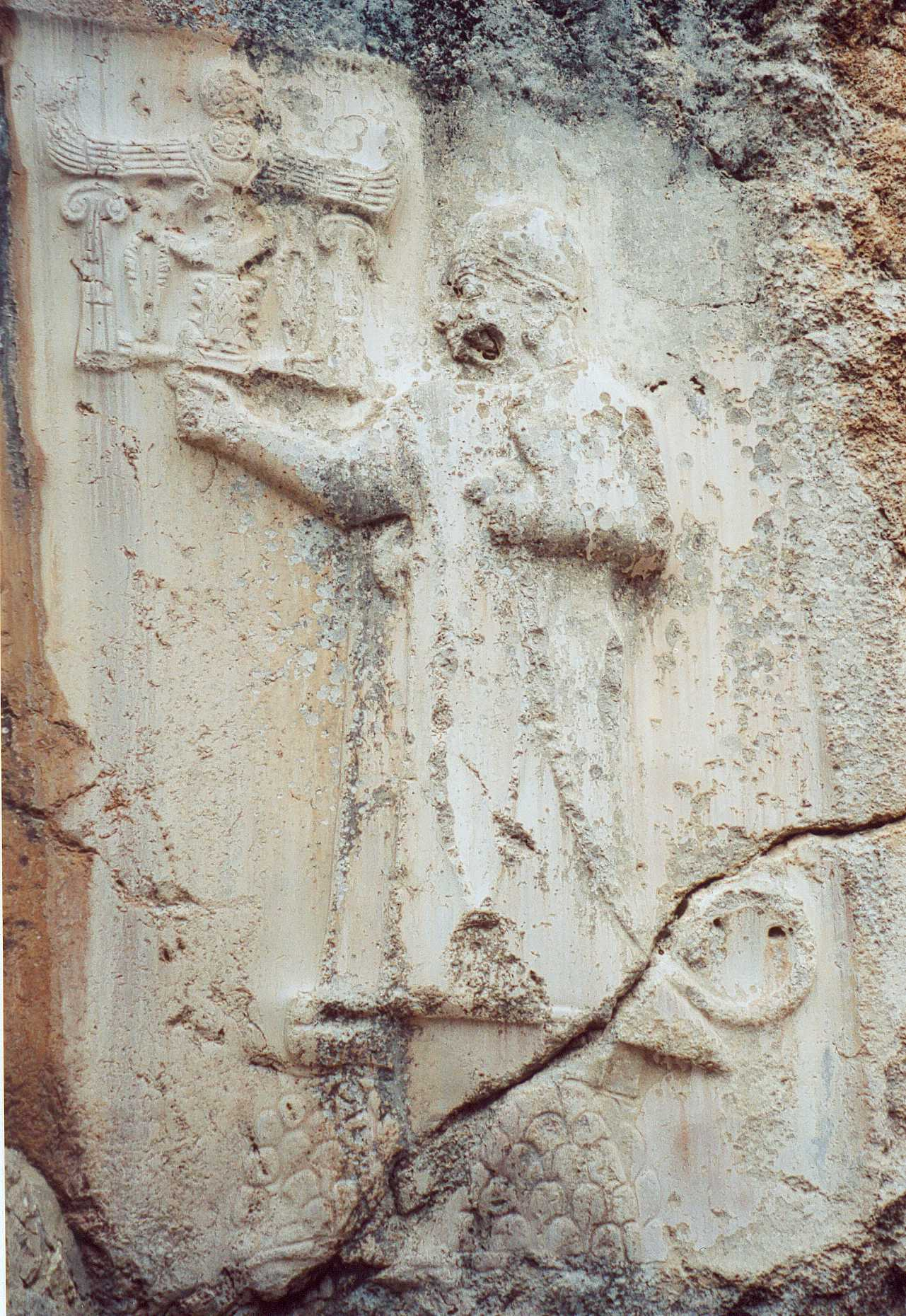
- Tudhaliya standing on two mountains, Yazilikaya relief 64

King of the Hittites
- Reign: c. 1245–1215 BC
- Predecessor: Ḫattušili III
- Successor: Arnuwanda III
- Issue: Arnuwanda III; Šuppiluliuma II
- Father: Ḫattušili III
- Mother: Puduhepa
- Religion: Hittite religion
- Seal

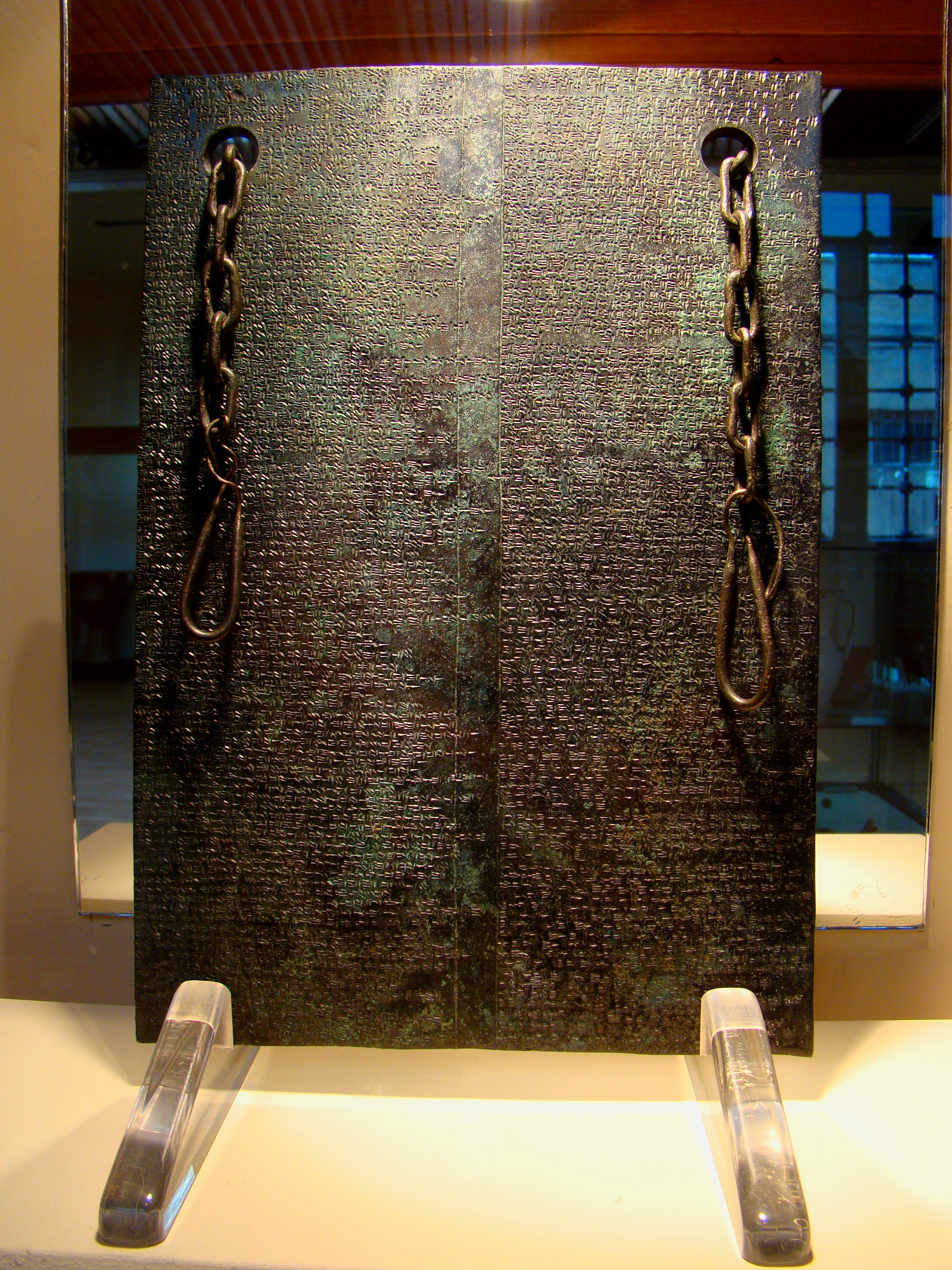
Bronze tablet from Boğazköy containing the treaty between Tudḫaliya IV and Kurunta of Tarḫuntašša (1235 BC). Museum of Anatolian Civilizations

Tudḫaliya IV was a king of the Hittite Empire (New kingdom), and the younger son of Ḫattušili III. He reigned c. 1245–1215 BC. His mother was the great queen, Puduḫepa.

== Early life ==
Tudḫaliya was likely born in his father's court in Ḫattuša, after his brother and crown prince Nerikkaili, but still while their father was governing on his brother Muwatalli II's behalf. He was a good friend of Muwatalli's son, Kurunta, and Ḫattušili ordered that they stay on good terms.

A document known as the "Apology" or "Autobiography" of Hattusili III indicates that he named Tudḫaliya as priest of the goddess Šauška of Samuha.

After Ḫattušili III as King wrote up a treaty with "Ulmi-Tessup" which confirmed Kurunta's rule over Tarḫuntašša, Ḫattušili elevated Tudḫaliya over his older brother to be his crown prince. Tudḫaliya as king drew up a treaty recorded on a bronze tablet confirming the links between him and Kurunta.

Tudḫaliya had a sister, Maathorneferure, who served as Great Royal Wife to Pharaoh Ramesses II of Egypt.

== Reign ==
The Hittite Empire covered large parts of Anatolia and Syria. Climate change set with drier conditions that caused a severe drought. Tudḫaliya IV responded by building at least 13 dams to secure water supplies, one of which still survives to this day at Alacahöyük.

In the East, Tudḫaliya IV faced the rival Assyrians. He suffered a severe defeat at the hands of Tukulti-Ninurta I of Assyria in the Battle of Nihriya, c. 1237 BC.

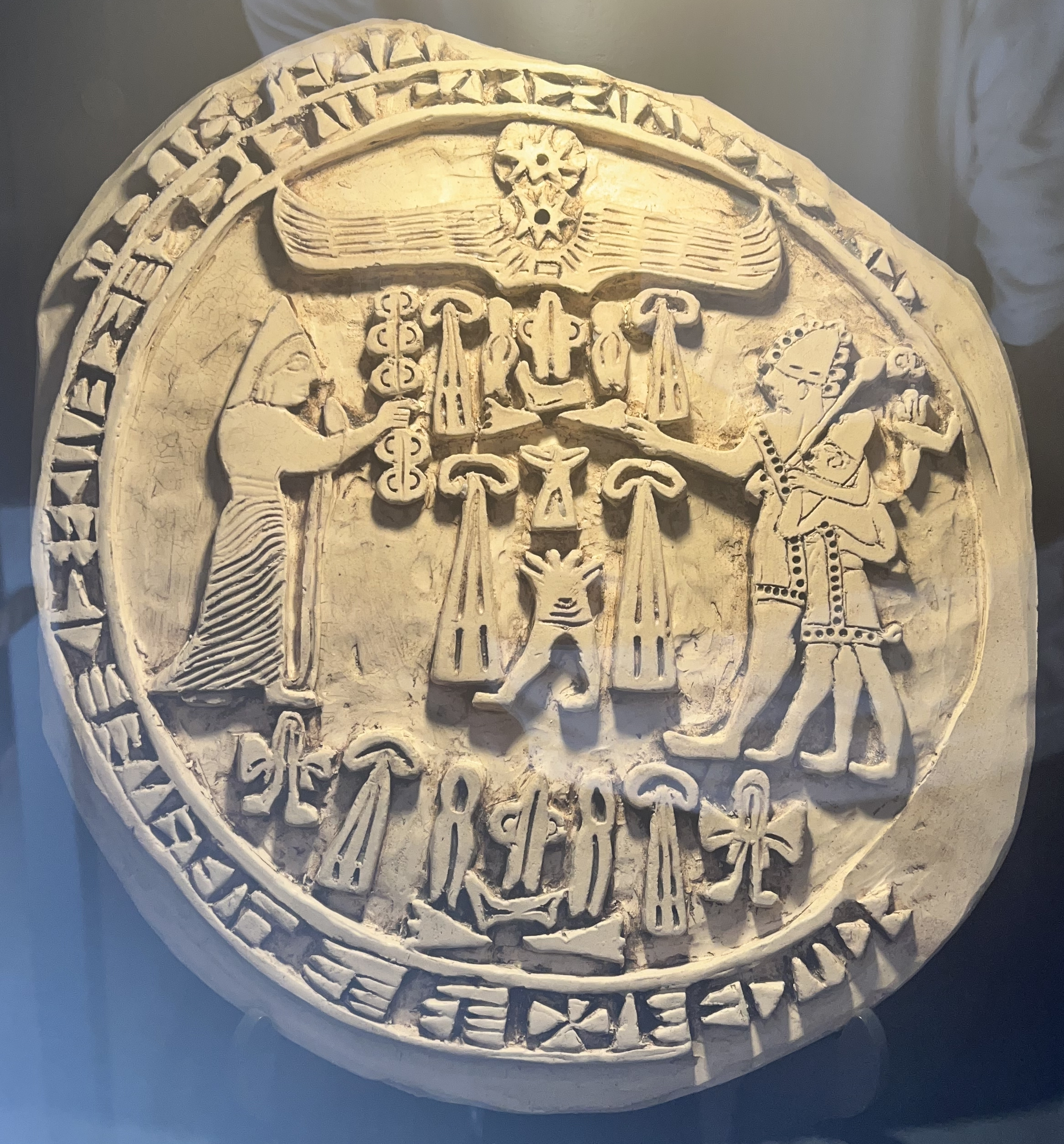
Seal of Tudḫaliya IV

Tudḫaliya, king of the Hittites, was reeling from defeat by the Assyrians at the Battle of Nihriya, refers to the Babylonian king as his equal, in his treaty with his vassal, Šaušgamuwa of Amurru, hinting at the possible existence of an alliance or at least a tacit understanding between them. It reads:

The kings who are equal to me (are) the king of Egypt, the king of Karanduniyaš (Babylon), the king of Assyria <and the king of Aḫḫiyawa>.
And if the king of Karanduniyaš is My Majesty's friend, he shall also be your friend; but if he is My Majesty's enemy, he shall also be your enemy.
Since the king of Assyria is My Majesty's enemy he shall also be your enemy.
Your merchant shall not enter into Assyria and you shall not allow his merchant into your land. He shall not pass through your land.
But if he enters into your land, you should seize him and send him off to My Majesty.

— Treaty between Tudḫaliya and Šaušgamuwa, Tablet A, column IV, lines 1-18 edited

In the Southwest, the empire had been divided with parts of the territory controlled by Kurunta of Tarḫuntašša.

A clay tablet (CTH 121), dating to the reign of Šuppiluliuma II, tells that a statue was set up by Tudḫaliya IV to commemorate his conquest of the Land of Alasiya (Cyprus?).

Tudḫaliya IV had two sons, Arnuwanda III and Šuppiluliuma II, who are considered the final two kings of the Hittite Empire.

== See also ==
- History of the Hittites

Regnal titles
Preceded by Ḫattušili III	Hittite king	Succeeded by Arnuwanda III
