= Amarna letter EA 170 =

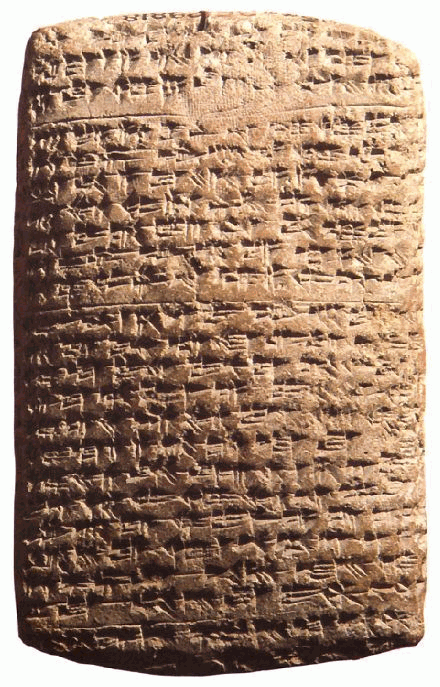
Aziru's EA 161 letter, Obverse (slightly out-of-focus)

Amarna letter EA 170, titled: "To Aziru in Egypt", is a moderate length letter (44 lines of text), from Aziru, the leader of the region of Amurru. EA 170 is the fifteenth letter in a series of 16 letters regarding Aziru.

As the title states, Aziru has finally visited Egypt to see the Pharaoh; the letter is mostly local home news, but does report the takeover over the Amqu region, in continued regional warfare.

EA 170 is a highly inscribed, undamaged Amarna letter, (see here: ), and can be seen to be inscribed on the Obverse, Bottom, Reverse, and Right & Left sides.

The Amarna letters, about 300, numbered up to EA 382, are a mid 14th century BC, about 1360 BC and 20–25 years later, correspondence. The initial corpus of letters were found at Akhenaten's city Akhetaten, in the floor of the Bureau of Correspondence of Pharaoh; others were later found, adding to the body of letters.

Letter EA 170 (also see here-(Obverse): ), is numbered VAT 327, from the Vorderasiatisches Museum Berlin.

== Summary of the Aziru letters sub-corpus ==
1) EA 156, Aziru to Pharaoh #1
2) EA 157, Aziru to Pharaoh #2
3) EA 158, Aziru to Dudu #1
4) EA 159, Aziru to Pharaoh #2
5) EA 160, Aziru to Pharaoh #3
6) EA 161, Aziru to Pharaoh #5
7) EA 162, Pharaoh to Amurru Prince
8) EA 163, Pharaoh to Amurru

9) EA 164, Aziru to Dudu #2
10) EA 165, Aziru to Pharaoh #6
11) EA 166, Amurru king Aziru to Haay
12) EA 167, Amurru king Aziru to (to Haay #2?)
13) EA 168, Aziru to Pharaoh #7
14) EA 169, Amurru son of Aziru to an Egyptian official
15) EA 170, Ba-Aluia & Battilu
16) EA 171, Amurru son of Aziru to an Egyptian official

== The letter ==
=== EA 170: "To Aziru in Egypt" ===
EA 170, letter fifteen of a series of 16 (2 from the Pharaoh), from Aziru of the Amurru kingdom, or his son, or stand-in. This letter is by Baaluya & Bet-ili. (Not a linear, line-by-line translation.)

Obverse (See here: )

(Lines 1-6)—To the king, our lord.^{1} Message of Baaluya and message of Bet-ili. We fall at the feet of our lord. For our lord may all go well. Here with^{2} the lands of our lord all goes well.

(7-13)—Our lord, do not worry at all. Do not trouble yourself. Our lord, as soon as you can, meet with^{3} them: zu-zi-la-ma-an(?) so they will not delay you there (any longer).

(14-18)—Moreover, troops of Hatti under Lupakku have captured cities of Amqu, and with^{4} the cities they captured Aaddumi. May our lord know (this).

Reverse (See here: )

(19-35)—Moreover, we have heard the following: Zitana has come and there are 90,000 infantryman that have come with him. We have, however, not confirmed^{5} the report, whether they are really there and have arrived in Nuhašše, and so I am sending Bet-ili to him. As soon as we meet with them, I will immediately send my messenger so he can report to you whether or not it is so.

(36-44)—To Rab(I)-Ilu and 'Abdi-d-URAŠ, to Bin-Ana and Rabi-ṣidqi: Message of Amur-Ba'la. For you may all go well. Do not trouble yourselves, and do not worry at all. Here with your families all goes very well. Wish Anatu well.–(complete EA 170, with no(?) lacunae, lines 1-44)

== See also ==
- Amarna letters–phrases and quotations
- List of Amarna letters by size
