= Ruhizzi =

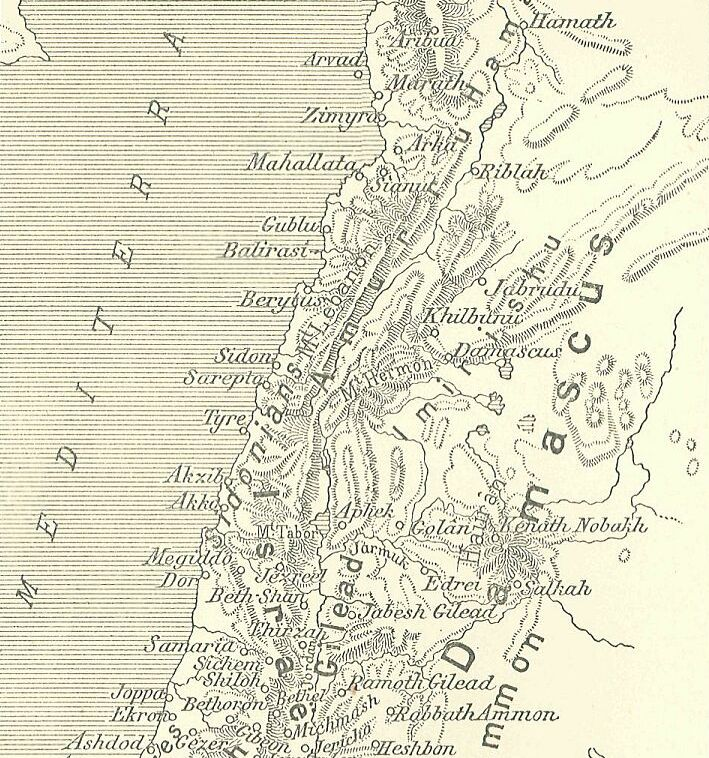

Ruhizzi, was a city, or city-state located in northern Canaan or southern Amurru territories, in the foothills of Mount Hermon during the time of the Amarna letters correspondence. During the 15-20 year Amarna letters of 1350-1335 BC, Arsawuya was the 'mayor' of Ruhizzi and corresponded with the Egyptian pharaoh.

According to EA 53, (EA for 'el Amarna'), a letter concerning a warring Etakkama, Ruhizzi was associated with the problems of Upu in the region to the south at Damascus, (named Dimašqu), and in the region of Amqu, (the Beqaa), in the northwest.

Ruhizzi is located near Kadesh-(Qidšu), and east of the Anti-Lebanon.

== See also ==
- Arsawuya, mayor of Ruhizzi
- Amarna letters
