= Niya Kingdom =

Niya (also Niye, Niy, Nii, and Nihe) was a kingdom in Syria near the Orontes River in northern Syria next to Nuhasse.

== History ==
=== Late Bronze ===
In the Amarna letters correspondence of 1350-1335 BC, Nii is referenced in two letters. The city of Tunip in the northern Levant had been trying to communicate to the Egyptian pharaoh for two decades, and resorted to another letter, EA 59: entitled: "From the citizens of Tunip", (EA for 'el Amarna'). The city-state of Arqa also sent a letter to pharaoh, requesting aid (EA 100).

The other letter referencing Nii concerns the individual Etakkama, his collusion with the Hittites, and the takeover of territory, 'city-states', and peoples in the northern and western Levant.

==== Mitanni Period ====
In the 15th century BC, the entire region came under the control of the Mitanni Empire.

==== Amarna Archive, "Nii", 2--letters ====
- EA 59, title: "From the citizens of Tunip"

"To the king of Egypt, our lord: Message of "the citizens of Tunip", your servant. For you may all go well. And we fall at the feet of my lord.
My lord, thus says "Tunip", your servant: Tunip—who ruled it in the past? Did not Manakhpirya-(i.e. "Men-Kheper-Rê-iya"): am-ma-ti-wu-uš (your ancestor) rule it?
The gods and the ...: na-ab-ri-il-la-an (=?) of the king of Egypt, our lord, dwell in Tunip, and he should inquire of his ancients: am-ma-ti (ancient) when we did not belong to our lord, the king of Egypt-(named: Mizri).
And now, for 20–years, we have gone on writing to the king, our lord, but our messengers have stayed on with the king, our lord. And now, our lord, we ask for the son of 'Aki- Teššup' from the king, our lord. May our lord give him.
My lord, if the king of Egypt has given the son of Aki-Teššup, why does the king, our lord, call him back from the journey?
And now Aziru is going to hear that in Hittite territory a hostile fate has overtaken your servant, a ruler (and) your gardener.
Should his (the king's) troops and his chariots be delayed, Aziru will do to us just as he did to Nii.
If we ourselves are negligent and the king of Egypt does nothing about these things that Aziru is doing, then he will surely direct his hand against our lord.
When Aziru entered Sumur, he did to them as he pleased, in the house of the king, our lord. But our lord did nothing about the(s)e things.
And now Tunip, your city, weeps, and its tears flow, and there is no grasping of our hand.
We have gone on writing to the king, our lord, the king of Egypt, for 20–years, and not a single word of our lord has reached us." -EA 59, lines 1-46 (complete)

- EA 53, title: "Of the villain Aitukama"

EA 53 is a 70–line letter of area intrigues, -(written by "Prince Akizzi" of Qatna). The letter starting at line 35:

"....
"My [l]ord, Teu[w]atti of L[apa]na and [A]rsawuya of Ruhizzi place themselves at the disposition of Aitukama, and he sends [U]pu, the land of my lord, up in flames.
My lord, just as I love the king, m[y] lord, so too the king of Nuhašše, the king of Nii, the king of Zinzar-(Shaizar), and the king of Tunanab; all of these kings are my lord's servants.
As far as the king, my lord, can, he co[mes forth. But] it is being said, "The king, my lord, will not come forth." [And so] may the king, my lord, send archers [that] they may co[me] to this country. [Si]nce, my lord, these kings are ones who l[ov]e him, let a magnate of the king, my lord, (come(?), just name their gifts so they can give them, (to them(?)).
My lord, if he makes this land a matter of concern to my lord, then may my lord send archers that they may come here. (Only) messengers of my lord have arrived here.
My lord, if Arsawuya of Ruhizzi, and Teuwatti of Lapana remain in Upu, and Tašša-(the city), remains in the Am[qu], my lord should also know about them that Upu wil not belong to my lord. Daily they write to Aitukama and say as follows: "Come, tak[e] Upu in its entirety."
My lord, just Dimaški in Upu: ka4-di-hi (falls) at your feet, so may Qatna: ka4-di-hu-li-eš (fall) at your feet. My lord, one asks for life before my messenger. I do not fear [at al]l in the presence of the archers of my lord, since the archers belong to my lord. If he sends (them) to me, they will en[ter] Qatna." -EA 53 (complete: only lines 35-70 (End)).

The region of Upu is centered at Damascus, and the Amqu is the Beqaa Valley region to the west and northwest. Nii, and Nuhašše are north and northeast(?).

==== Hittite Period ====
It is also mentioned in the Hittite Sources under Suppiluliuma I who conquered the region.

== See also ==
- Arqa-(Irqata)
- Nuhašše
- Amqu-the Beqaa
- Upu
