= Menkheperre (name) =

Menkheperre in hieroglyphs
ra mn xpr
Mn-ḫpr-Rˁ
Enduring is the apparition of Ra

Menkheperre was an ancient Egyptian theophoric name. Its most famous use is as the throne name of three Egyptian monarchs:

- Thutmose III, pharaoh of the 18th Dynasty of Egypt
- Ini (pharaoh), pharaoh of the Third Intermediate Period
- Necho I, pharaoh of the 26th Dynasty of Egypt

Other notable bearers were:

- Menkheperre (prince), prince, son of King Thutmose III
- Menkheperre, Theban High Priest of Amun during the 21st Dynasty

People with a very similar name were:

- Menkheperraseneb I, High Priest of Amun during the 18th Dynasty
- Menkheperreseneb II, High Priest of Amun during the 18th Dynasty
- Menkheperure, throne name of Thutmose IV, pharaoh of the 18th Dynasty
