= Amarna letter EA 156 =

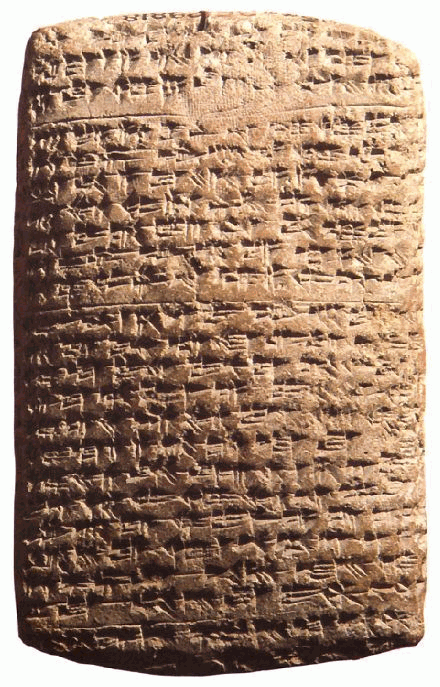
EA 161, Obverse (slightly out-of-focus)

Amarna letter EA 156, titled: "Aziru of Amurru", is a very short letter from Aziru, the leader of the region of Amurru. EA 156 is the first letter in a series of 16 letters regarding Aziru.

In synopsis, the 16 letters talk of servitude to the Pharaoh:

- The development of a city;
- The desire to visit Egypt, by Aziru (or his son);
- The warfare 2 days distant in Nuhasse by the kings of the region;
- The continued sending and receiving of messengers.
- A letter to Aziru, when visiting Egypt.
- A final conditions letter (players and regions).

The Amarna letters, about 300, numbered up to EA 382, are a mid 14th century BC, about 1360 BC and 20–25 years later, correspondence. The initial corpus of letters were found at Akhenaten's city Akhetaten, in the floor of the Bureau of Correspondence of Pharaoh; others were later found, adding to the body of letters.

Letter EA 156 (also see here-(Obverse): ), is numbered VAT 337, from the Vorderasiatisches Museum Berlin.

== Summary of the Aziru letters sub-corpus ==
1) EA 156, Aziru to Pharaoh #1
2) EA 157, Aziru to Pharaoh #2
3) EA 158, Aziru to Dudu #1
4) EA 159, Aziru to Pharaoh #2
5) EA 160, Aziru to Pharaoh #3
6) EA 161, Aziru to Pharaoh #5
7) EA 162, Pharaoh to Amurru Prince
8) EA 163, Pharaoh to..

9) EA 164, Aziru to Dudu #2
10) EA 165, Aziru to Pharaoh #6
11) EA 166, Amurru king Aziru to Haay
12) EA 167, Amurru king Aziru to (to Haay #2?)
13) EA 168, Aziru to Pharaoh #7
14) EA 169, Amurru son of Aziru to an Egyptian official
15) EA 170, Ba-Aluia & Battilu
16) EA 171, Amurru son of Aziru to an Egyptian official

== The letter ==
=== EA 156: "Aziru in Amurru" ===
EA 156, letter number one of a series of 15 (2 from the Pharaoh), from Aziru of the Amurru kingdom. (Not a linear, line-by-line translation.)

Obverse (See here: )

(Lines 1-3)—To the king, my lord, my god, my [S]un: Message of Aziru, your servant. I fall at the feet of my lord 7 times and 7 times.

(4-8)—Now as to a(ny) request that the Sun, my lord, makes, I am [yo]ur servant forever, and my sons are your servants.

(9-14)—I herewith give [ my ] sons as 2 att[endants],^{1} and they are to do what the k[ing, my lord], orders. But let him leave [me] in Amurru.^{2}–(complete EA 156, with minor lacunae restored, lines 1-14)

Reverse (the Reverse is not inscribed; see here: )

== See also ==
- Amarna letters–phrases and quotations
- List of Amarna letters by size
