= Arsawuya =

Mayor of Ruhizzi

Arsawuya (fl. c. 1340 BC) may have been a mayor of Ruhizzi, located east of Qidšu-(Kadesh), and farther east beyond the Anti-Lebanon mountain range, during the 1350–1335 BC Amarna letters correspondence. He is referenced in five letters, two letters of which he wrote to the Egyptian pharaoh, letters EA 191, and 192, (EA for 'el Amarna').

== Arsawuya's second letter ==
The complete topic of Arsawuya's second letter is missing because of a multi-sentence lacuna.

=== EA 191, "Preparations for war" ===
To the king, my lord: Message of Arsawuya, the ruler of Ruhizza. I fall at the feet of the king, my lord. The king, my lord, wrote to me to make preparations before the arrival of the archers of the king, my lord, and before the arrival of his many commissioners.
And could I think of not serving the king, my lord?
May I join up with the archers of the king and his commissioners so that, having everything prepared, I might follow them wherever they are at war against the king, my lord, and we capture them (and) give his enemies into the hand of the king, our lord. —EA 191, lines 1-21 (complete)

=== EA 192, "Message received" ===
[Sa]y [t]o the king, my lord, both Sun and my god: Message of [A]rsawuya, the loyal servant [o]f the king, my lord, [and the di]rt at the feet of the king, my lord. I fall at the feet of the king, my lord, both Sun and my god, 7 times and 7 times.
[I have] heard the words [of the king], my lord and my god, [and here]with [...] ...[the king], (my) lord. And the king, [m]y lord, must [not] neglect his country. —EA 192, lines 1-17 (complete, with lines 12-15 a lacuna)

== See also ==
- Etakkama of Kadesh-(Qidšu)
