= Tunip =

City-state in western Syria in 1350–1335 BC

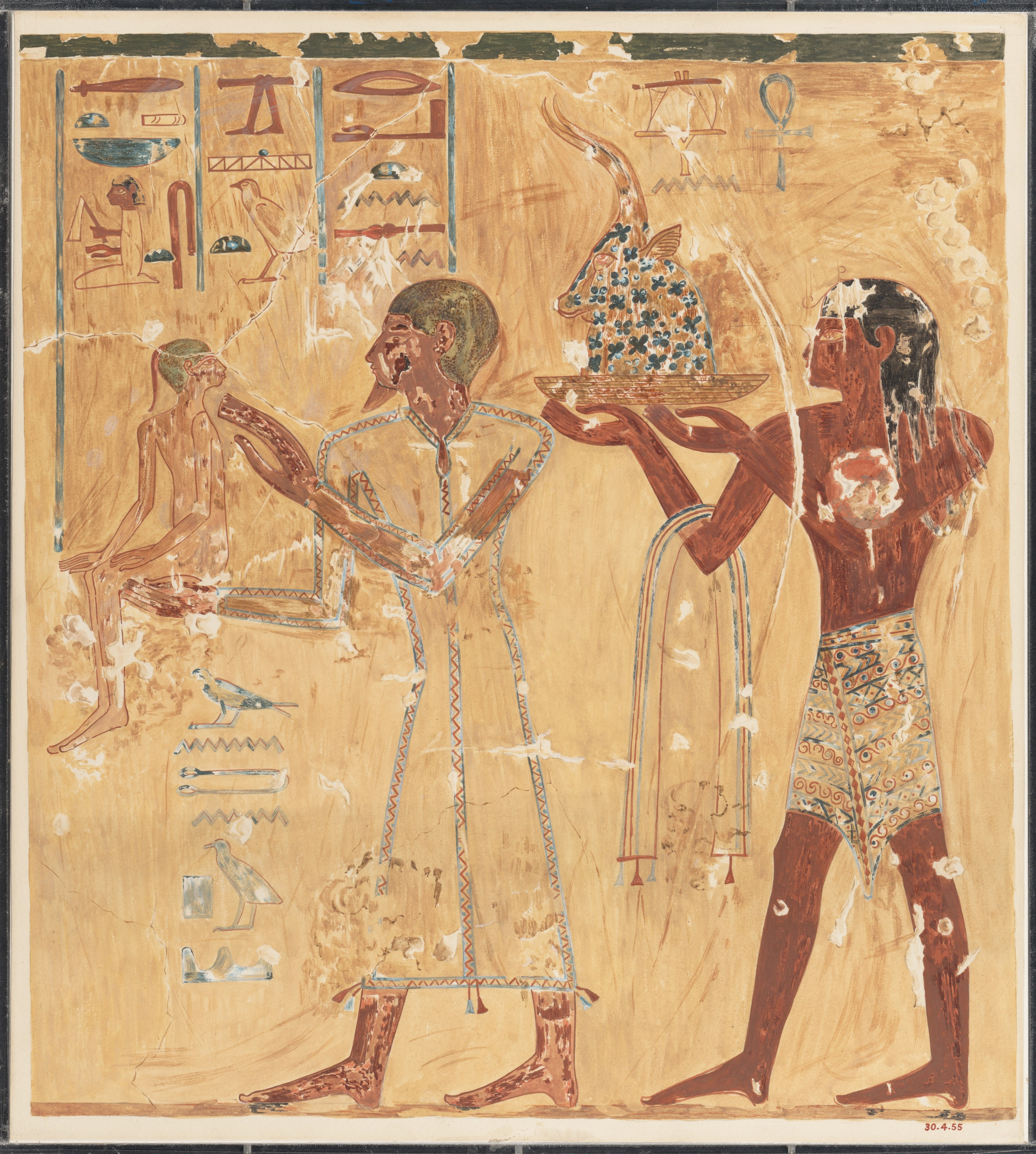
- An Egyptian painting from tomb of Menkheperraseneb I, depicting the prince of Tunip (left) bearing tribute

- Location of Tell Asharneh, often identified with Tunip
- 35.2869°N 36.3978°E
- Periods: Bronze Age
- Location: Syria
- Region: Hama Governorate

Site notes
- Area: c. 77 ha

Tunip (Eblaite: Du-ne-íb{ki} or Du-ni-íb{ki} or Du-ne-bù{ki}) (probably modern Tell 'Acharneh) was a city-state along the Orontes River in western Syria in the Bronze Age. It was large enough to be an urban center, but too small to be a dominant regional power. It was under the influence of various factions like the Mitanni, Egyptians, and Hittites.

== Location ==
The exact location of Tunip remains uncertain. There is increasing evidence for identifying the ancient city with the archaeological site of Tell 'Acharneh.

This important city was sought either in northern Phoenicia (Helck 1973) or in the Middle Orontes. Two prominent sites have been suggested in the latter region: Tell Hama in the modern city of Hama (Astour 1977) and Tell Asharneh in the southern Ghab Valley northwest of Hama (Klengel 1995).

Tell Asharneh (or Tell 'Acharneh) on the banks of the Orontes River in Syria has been widely seen as the likely location of Tunip. The site covers an area of 77-hectare (190-acre) and is near Tell Salhab. The authors of the above study support the identification of Tunip as Tell Asharneh based on petrographic analysis.

A team of Canadian archaeologists have been conducting excavations at the site of Tell 'Acharneh, under the direction of Michel Fortin of Laval University in Quebec City.

== Early Bronze ==
The only mentions of Tunip in the Early Bronze Age come from the Ebla Palace G archives (c.2400 BC - c.2300 BC) when the city fell under the hegemony of Ebla. During this period, a colony of at least 530 men from Mari resided here. Their group was led by Puzur-Aštar and consisted of 30 merchants and their workers. They were likely involved in the timber trade, harvesting timber from the nearby mountainous regions to export back to Mari. It has also been suggested by Bonechi that attestations in the Ebla texts of men from Byblos at Tunip may connect it to trade routes going to Egypt.

== Late Bronze ==
The appellation 'Tunip' is mainly from Egyptian records, from the time of Thutmose III to Ramesses II. The name Tunip also appears in names like that of a king named Tunip-Tessup.

It is especially mentioned in the Amarna letters (c. 1350 BC), the time of Akhenaten and Tutankhamun. Matters concern turmoil and local rulers like Aziru, residing in Amurru (Simur/Tell Kezel, Akkar Plain) and in conflict with the king of Hatti. He is often claiming to reside in Tunip, until it is safe to leave, or to try to defend other cities/city-states of his region. The local region in Syria, Nuhašše is also in conflict, and is mentioned in 7 of Aziru's 13 EA letters, (EA for 'el Amarna').

=== Amarna Archive ===
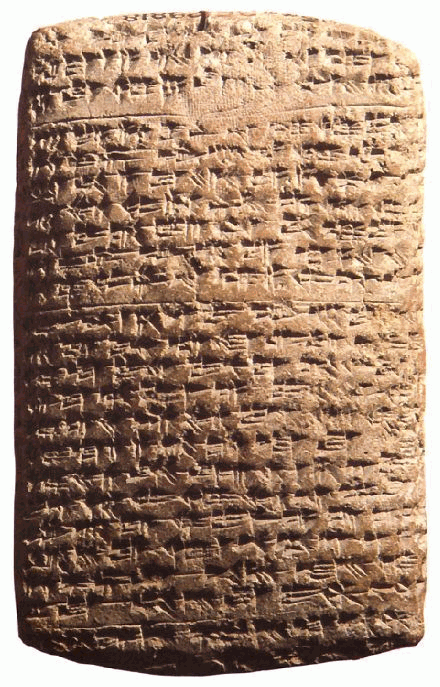
Amarna letter EA 161, Aziru to Pharaoh, title: An Absence Explained.

The Amarna Archive refers to cuneiform tablets found at Amarna, Egypt, dating to the late reign of Akhenaten and early reign of Tutankhamun. There is a high and low chronology for these kings, which may affect the synchronization of events in the northern Levant. In general, the region was under the control of Tushratta of Mitanni, who, around 1350 BC, was attacked by Suppiluliuma I of Hatti, causing major turmoil in the entire Levant. Egypt was formally an ally of Mitanni at the time. A faction of the citizens of Tunip belonged to the Pro-Egyptian faction, writing to the Pharaoh for support.

Five letters reference 'Tunip' in the Amarna letters corpus, 3 from Aziru's sub-corpus.

1. EA 57–Title: "Of kings and Tunip"-damaged letter
2. EA 59–Title: "From the citizens of Tunip"-
3. EA 161—"An absence explained"-Aziru letter no. 6 of 13
4. EA 165–"Tunip threatened"-Aziru letter no. 9 of 13
5. EA 167–"The constant Hittite menace"-Aziru letter no. 11 of 13

==== Amarna Letter EA 59 - From the citizens of Tunip ====
Amarna Letter EA 59 (lines 1-46, complete) show the citizens of Tunip appealing for help from the Pharaoh.

To the king of Egypt, our lord: Message of the citizens of Tunip, your servant. For you, may all go well. And we fall at the feet of my lord.

My lord, thus says Tunip, your servant: Tunip—who ruled it in the past? Did not Manakhpirya-(i.e. "Men-Kheper-Rê-iya"): am-ma-ti-wu-uš (your ancestor) rule it?
The gods and the ...: na-ab-ri-il-la-an (=?) of the king of Egypt, our lord, dwell in Tunip, and he should inquire of his ancients: am-ma-ti (ancient) when we did not belong to our lord, the king of Egypt-(named "Mizri"-see: Mizraim).
And now, for 20–years, we have gone on writing to the king, our lord, but our messengers have stayed on with the king, our lord. And now, our lord, we ask for the son of 'Aki- Teššup' from the king, our lord. May our lord give him.
My lord, if the king of Egypt has given the son of Aki-Teššup, why does the king, our lord, call him back from the journey?
And now Aziru is going to hear that in Hittite territory a hostile fate has overtaken your servant, a ruler (and) your gardener.
Should his (the king's) troops and his chariots be delayed, Aziru will do to us just as he did to Nii.
If we are negligent and the king of Egypt does nothing about these things that Aziru is doing, then he will surely direct his hand against our lord.
When Aziru entered Sumur-(Zemar), he did to them as he pleased, in the house of the king, our lord. But our lord did nothing about the(s)e things.
And now, Tunip, your city, weeps, and its tears flow,–and there is no grasping of our hand.
We have gone on writing to the king, our lord, the king of Egypt, for 20–years, and not a single word of our lord has reached us."

==== Amarna Letter EA 161 - An absence explained, Aziru no. 6 of 13 ====
Amarna Letter EA 161 (lines 1-56, complete) shows how Aziru claims he was made a 'mayor' of his region (or city), in Amurru.

To the Great King, my lord, my god, [my Sun]: Message of Aziru, your servant. I fall at the feet of my lord, [m]y god, my Sun, 7 times and 7 times.

My lord, I am your servant, and on my arrival in the presence of the king, my lord, I spoke of all my affairs in the presence of the king, my lord. My lord, do not listen to the treacherous men who denounce me in the presence of the king, my lord. I am your servant forever.
The king, my lord, has spoken about Han'i. My lord, I was residing in Tunip, and so I did not know that he had arrived. As soon as I heard, I went up after him, but I did not overtake him. May Han'i arrive safe and sound so that the king, my lord, can ask him how I provided for him. My brothers and Bet-ili were at his service; they gave oxen, sheep, and goats, and birds, his food and strong drink.
I gave horses and asses, [f]or his journey. May the king, my lord, hear my words. [W]hen I come to the king, my lord, Han'i will go before me; like a mother and like a father, he will provide for me. And no(w) my lord says, "You hid yourself from Han'i." –May your gods and the Sun be witness: (I swear):–"I was residing in Tunip."
The king, my lord, has spoken about the building of Sumur-(Zemar). The kings of Nuhašše have been at war with me and have taken my cities at the instruction of Hatip. So I have not built it. Now, in all haste, I am going to build it.
And may my lord know that Hatip has taken half of the things that the king, my lord, gave (gave me). All the gold and silver that the king, my lord, gave me, Hatip has taken. May my lord know (this).
Moreover, the king, my lord, also said, "Why did you provide for the messenger of the king of Hatti, but did not provide for my messenger?" But this is the land of my lord, and the king, my lord, made me –one of the mayors!
Let my lord's messenger come to me so I can give all that I promised in the presence of the king, my lord. I will give food supplies, ships, oil, logs, of boxwood, and other woods.

== See also ==
- Tikunani
- Aziru
- Nuhašše
- Niya (kingdom)
- Amqu
- Amurru

== Links ==
https://www.crane.utoronto.ca/tell-acharneh.html
