= Amarna letter EA 161 =

Antiques

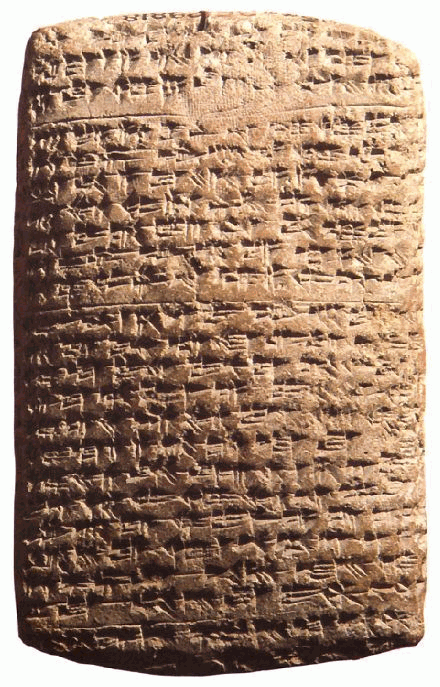
- Material: Clay
- Length: c. 8.2 centimeters
- Height: c. 12 centimeters
- Width: c. 2.5 centimeters
- Created: c. 1340 BC
- Present location: British Museum, England, United Kingdom
- Identification: BM 29818
- Language: Akkadian

Amarna letter EA 161, titled An Absence Explained, is a tall clay tablet letter of 8 paragraphs, with single paragraphing lines. The surface is somewhat degraded, but most cuneiform signs that remain (undamaged corners, or scrapes contain lost signs, added by context per translation), allow for a relative complete translation context for the letter, and the eight paragraphs. The clay tablet is no. BM 29818 at the British Museum; the number is visible at the top of the tablet, above Para I-(in black ink, the top half of the number visible).

The letter is around 3.2 in long x 4.7 in tall, and around 1 inch wide. The text of the letter does not end at the right margin of the letter; instead the text appears to use the side of the clay tablet.

The Amarna letters, about 300, numbered up to EA 382, were made from around 1360-1335 BC. The initial corpus of letters were found at Amenhotep IV's city Akhetaten, in the floor of the Bureau of Correspondence of Pharaoh; others were later found, adding to the body of letters.

== Text ==
Paragraph I is a very short introductory, salutory paragraph, with sections of the prostration formula, notably: 7 times and 7 times, God-mine, Sun-mine, I bow. The appellation "My Lord" is used here in Para I, and throughout the letter's paragraphs; my Lord is Lord-mine, and in EA 161 uses the sumerogram EN, for "Lord", with the possessive first person mine, ia (cuneiform). Many other Amarna letters use "be-li", or equivalent for 'lord', Akkadian language, bēlu. Cuneiform "ia"-(-iya) is still used today in world languages in Asia/Southeast Asia as -iya, as for example "TownXYZ-iya", "TownXYZ-mine". -Ia, or ia, is extremely common throughout the Amarna letters with one of the most common phrases being: King, Lord, mine, often at the very beginning of a letter (especially vassal city-states, Canaan), but will then be repeated throughout the letter.

Para II begins the story of the letter, and the context of persons and places involved. Para III introduces Tunip, one of two "locations", city townfolk who authored an Amarna letter to the pharaoh; EA 59, From the Citizens of Tunip, and EA 100, The City of Irqata to the King. Notably, Para III ends with a list of 6 supply items needed for the arrival of messenger Han'i, a list similar to items needed for the arrival of archers (Egyptian pitati), part of Pharaoh's foreign army. The list ends with a cuneiform sign for "plural" for each listed item; though many signs are degraded in lines 21, 22, every alternate sign (mostly) in lines 21, 22, is for the plural: "MEŠ (cuneiform)" (or is a sumerogram equivalent).

== The letter ==
=== EA 161: An Absence Explained ===
Letter 3 of 13 between Aziru and the Pharaoh of Egypt (Egypt named Misri in the letters). (A free-form, non sequential, 20th century, French-English translation)

(Para I, Lines 1-3)–To the Great King, my lord, my god, [my Sun]: Message-( um-ma) of Aziru, your servant. I fall at the feet of my lord, [m]y god, my Sun, 7 times and 7 times.
(Para II, 4-10)–My lord, I am your servant, and on my arrival in the presence of the king, my lord, I spoke of all my affairs in the presence of the king, my lord. My lord, do not listen to the treacherous men that denounce me in the presence of the king, my lord. I am your servant forever.
(Para III, 11-22)–The king, my lord, has spoken about Han'i-(Ha-Ni-I). My lord, I was residing in ^{(townsite)}Tunip,-(^{URU}-Tu-Ni-iP) and so I did not know that he had arrived. As soon as I heard, I went up after him, but I did not overtake him. May Han'i arrive safe and sound so that the king, my lord, can ask him how I provided for him. My brothers and Bet-ili were at his service; they gave oxen, sheep, and goats, and birds, his food and strong drink.
(Para IV, 23-34)–I gave horses and asses, [f]or his journey. May the king, my lord, hear my words. [W]hen I come to the king, my lord, Han'i will go before me; like a mother and like a father he will provide for me. And no(w) my lord says, "You hid yourself from Han'i." –May your gods and the Sun be witness: (I swear):–"I was residing in Tunip."
(Para V, 35-40)–The king, my lord, has spoken about the building of Sumur-(Zemar). The kings of Nuhašše have been at war with me and have taken my cities at the instruction of Hatip. So I have not built it. Now, in all haste, I am going to build it.
(Para VI, 41-46)–And may my lord know that Hatip has taken half of the things that the king, my lord, gave (gave me). All the gold and silver that the king, my lord, gave me, Hatip has taken. May my lord know (this).
(Para VII, 47-53)–Moreover, the king, my lord, also said, "Why did you provide for the messenger of the king of Hatti, but did not provide for my messenger?" But this is the land of my lord, and the king, my lord, made me –one of the mayors!
(Para VIII, 54-56)–Let my lord's messenger come to me so I can give all that I promised in the presence of the king, my lord. I will give food supplies, ships, oil, logs, of boxwood, and (other) woods. -EA 161, lines 1-56 (complete)

== Summary of the Aziru letters sub-corpus ==
1) EA 156, Aziru to Pharaoh #1
2) EA 157, Aziru to Pharaoh #2
3) EA 158, Aziru to Dudu #1
4) EA 159, Aziru to Pharaoh #2
5) EA 160, Aziru to Pharaoh #3
6) EA 161, Aziru to Pharaoh #5
7) EA 162, Pharaoh to Amurru Prince
8) EA 163, Pharaoh to..

9) EA 164, Aziru to Dudu #2
10) EA 165, Aziru to Pharaoh #6
11) EA 166, Amurru king Aziru to Haay
12) EA 167, Amurru king Aziru to (to Haay #2?)
13) EA 168, Aziru to Pharaoh #7
14) EA 169, Amurru son of Aziru to an Egyptian official
15) EA 170, Ba-Aluia & Battilu
16) EA 171, Amurru son of Aziru to an Egyptian official

== See also ==
- Tunip
- Aziru
- Amarna letters–phrases and quotations
- List of Amarna letters by size
  - Amarna letter EA 5, EA 9, EA 15, EA 19, EA 26, EA 27, EA 35, EA 38
  - EA 153, EA 161, EA 288, EA 364, EA 365, EA 367
