= Rekem =

Rekem may be:

- Rekem, Belgium, part of the municipality of Lanaken, province of Limburg
- an ancient name for the city of Petra, Kadesh or some other Middle Eastern city
- Rekem (Midianite king), killed by Phinehas in the time of Moses
