= Amarna letter EA 158 =

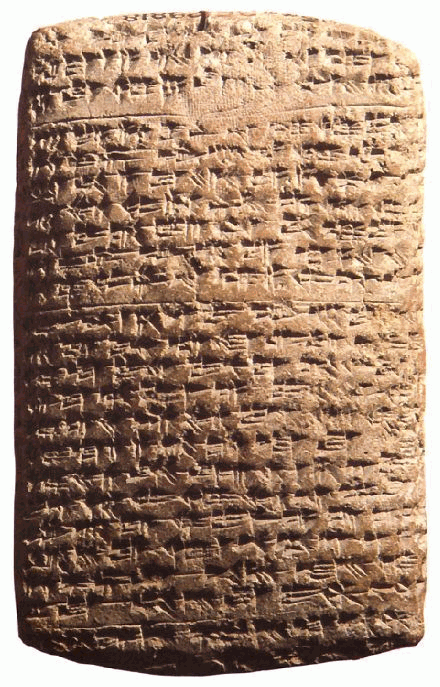
EA 161, Obverse (slightly out-of-focus)

Amarna letter EA 158, titled: "Father and Son", is a moderate length letter from Aziru, the leader of the region of Amurru. The letter is written to the Egyptian official, Tutu/ (Dudu). EA 158 is the third letter in a series of 16 letters regarding Aziru.

In synopsis, the 16 letters talk of servitude to the Pharaoh:

- The development of a city;
- The desire to visit Egypt, by Aziru (or his son);
- The warfare 2 days distant in Nuhasse by the kings of the region;
- The continued sending and receiving of messengers.
- A letter to Aziru, when visiting Egypt.
- A final conditions letter (players and regions).

The Amarna letters, about 300, numbered up to EA 382, are a mid 14th century BC, about 1360 BC and 20–25 years later, correspondence. The initial corpus of letters were found at Akhenaten's city Akhetaten, in the floor of the Bureau of Correspondence of Pharaoh; others were later found, adding to the body of letters.

Letter EA 158 (also see here-(Obverse): ), is numbered C 4758 (12205), from the Cairo Museum.

== Summary of the Aziru letters sub-corpus ==
1) EA 156, Aziru to Pharaoh #1
2) EA 157, Aziru to Pharaoh #2
3) EA 158, Aziru to Dudu #1
4) EA 159, Aziru to Pharaoh #2
5) EA 160, Aziru to Pharaoh #3
6) EA 161, Aziru to Pharaoh #5
7) EA 162, Pharaoh to Amurru Prince
8) EA 163, Pharaoh to..

9) EA 164, Aziru to Dudu #2
10) EA 165, Aziru to Pharaoh #6
11) EA 166, Amurru king Aziru to Haay
12) EA 167, Amurru king Aziru to (to Haay #2?)
13) EA 168, Aziru to Pharaoh #7
14) EA 169, Amurru son of Aziru to an Egyptian official
15) EA 170, Ba-Aluia & Battilu
16) EA 171, Amurru son of Aziru to an Egyptian official

== The letter ==
=== EA 158: "Father and Son" ===
EA 158, letter number three of a series of 16 (2 from the Pharaoh), from Aziru of the Amurru kingdom. (Not a linear, line-by-line translation.)

Obverse (See here: )

(Lines 1-4)—T[o] Tutu, my lord, [my] father: Message of Aziru, your son, our servant.^{1} I fall at the feet of my father. For my father may all go well.

(5-9)—Tutu, I herewi[th gr]ant^{2} the re[ques]t of the ki[ng. m]y l[or]d, [and] whatever may be the request [o]f the king, my lord, he should write and I w[ill g]rant it.

(10-13)—Moreover, a[s] you in that place are my father, whatever may be the request of Tutu, my f[at]her, just write and I will grant it.^{3}

(14-19)—[A]s you are my father and my lord, [and] I am your son, the land of Amurru is your [lan]d, and my house is your house. [Wr]ite me any request at all of yours, and I will grant your [eve]ry^{4} request.

(20-26)—[And] you are in the personal service [of the king, m]y [lord. Hea]ven forbid^{5} that treacherous men have spoken maliciously [again]st me^{6} in the presence of the king, my lord. And you should not permit them.

Reverse (See here: )

(27-31)—[And a]s you are^{7} in the personal service [of the king, m]y lord, representing me,^{8} you should not permit malicious talk [ag]ainst me.

(32-35)—I am the servant of the king, my lord, and I will [n]ot deviate from the orders of the king, my lord, or from the orders of Tutu, my father, forever.

(36-38)—[But i]f the king, my lord, does not love me and rejects me, then what a[m] I to s[a]y?–(complete EA 158, with major & minor lacunae restored, lines 1-38)

== See also ==
- Amarna letters–phrases and quotations
- List of Amarna letters by size
