= Upu =

Region surrounding Damascus of the 1350 BC Amarna letters

Upu (Apu/Aba/Apa/Apina/Ubi/Upi), was the region centered on the city of Damascus in the Late Bronze Age.

== History ==
Damascus was named Dimašqu / Dimasqu / etc. (for example, "Dimaški"-(see: Niya Kingdom), in the letter correspondence.

=== Late Bronze Age ===
==== Battle of Megiddo ====
Trevor Bryce (2012) states that Upu was among the cities/kingdoms fighting at the Battle of Megiddo against Thutmose III of Egypt (c. 1479 BC).

==== Amarna period ====
In the Amarna Letters (c. 1350 BC), the region is mentioned in three letters, EA 53, 189, and 197 (EA is for 'el Amarna'). Etakkama of Qidšu (Kadesh) in the Beqaa (named the Amqu) is in partial control, between allegiance to Pharaoh, and conjoining forces with the king of Hatti.

The intrigue of the three Amarna letters appears to involve areas to the north and northwest of Damascus, into Lebanon and the Beqaa (named Amqu).

===== EA 053. Qaṭna [client letter] =====
(o 001) (Speak) to ^{m}nam-ḫur-ia (Akhenaten/Tutankhamen), the son of the Sun god, my lord, a message from [A]kizzi, your servant. I fall seven times (and) [seven times a]t the feet of my lord.

(o 004) My lord, I am your servant, alive and not dead [(Akk. gloss: dead). I] belong to my lord, and am now, my lord, the servant of my very lord in this place. In this place, I, myself, a[m] now your very servant, the one who belongs to my lord, but the king of the land of Hatti is [n]ow <cau>sing Etakkama to campaign [again]st me, and he (i.e., Etakkama) has been desiring my head. (o 011) But now [Etakka]ma has sent a message to me and said: "[Come] with me to the king of the land of Hat[ti]! " I [sai]d: "How can I [go t]o the king of the land of Hatti? I belong to [my] lo[rd, king of the land of Eg]ypt." I sent a message and [...] to the king of the land of Hatti. (o 017) My lord [...] and this land [...]. But if [....], so my lord should dispatch him as [quickly] as [possible] so that he can come here a[gainst E]ṭakkama. As my lord [...] your face [...], he will become afraid, and the land of A[pu will change allegia]nce to my lord. (o 024) My lord, Haddu/Teššub-nerari, [king of the land of Nuhašše], is an enemy of the land of H[atti, together with Etakkama]. [Haddu/Teššub-nerari is a servant] of my lord, and the land of Nu[hašše is a land of] his forefathers.. My lord, E[takkam]a came, and [he seized the land of Ap]u, lands [o]f my lord. And he captured the house [of Biryawaza]. He captured 200 i[ngots of ...], he captured 300 ingots [of ...], and he captured 100 ingots [of ..., everything] from the house of Biryawaza. (o 035) My lord, Tiwate of L[aban]a and Arzawya of Ruhizu are at the disposal of Etakkama, and he is burning the land of Apu, lands of my lord, with flames. (r 040) My lord, just as I am loyal to the king, my lord, like so (are) the king of the land of Nuhašše, the king of the land of Niya, the king of the land of Zinzar, and the king of the land of Tunanab; these ones are the entirety of the kings belonging to my lord, (that is) his servants. (r 045) As the king, my lord, is able to, he should ca[mpaign]. But if the king, my lord, does not campaign, my lord should dispatch the regular army so that it comes to this land. [A]s, my lord, these kings are his servants, my lord’s official should command whatever (as) their gifts so that they can give them. (r 052) My lord, if this land is a concern for my lord, my lord should dispatch the regular army so that it comes here. (Only) my lord’s messengers have arrived here. (r 056) My lord, if Arzawya of Ruhizu and Tiwate of Labana are present in the land of Apu, and Taššu is present in the land of ʿAmqu, my lord should know about them. As the land of Apu does not belong to my lord, daily they were sending messages to Etakkama and they said as follows: "Come here and capture all of the land of Apu!”

(r 063) My lord, just as Damascus in the land of Apu {Hurr. falls} at your feet, like so{Hurr. may} Qaṭna {Hurr. fall} at your feet. My lord, one requests life for my messenger. [A]s I am not fearful of my lor[d’s] regular arm[y] because the regular troops belong to [my] lord, when he dispatches (them) to me, [they] will ent[er] into Qaṭna.

===== EA 189. Qadesh [client letter] =====
(o 001) To the king, my lord, a message from Etakkama, your servant. I fall at the feet of my lord, my Sun god, seven times plus seven times.

(o 005) My lord, I am your servant, but the evil Biryawaza was defaming me before you, my lord – and while he was defaming me before you, he captured from me the entirety of my paternal estate outside of the land of Qidšu, and he sent my cities up in flames (Akk. gloss: fire) – but, look, the commissioners of the king, my lord, and his senior officials know my loyalty. Since I spoke to the senior official Puhuru, the senior official Puhuru should know that [...] the house of [....] (r 01') [... ...] Biryawaza. In this manner, I serve you together with all of my brothers. Wherever (there is) hostility towards the king, my lord, I myself go together with my troops, together with my chariots, and together with all of my brothers. But, look, Biryawaza permitted all the cities of the king, my lord, (to go) to the habiru in the land of Tahšu and in the land of Apu. But I arrived – your gods and your Sun god were going before me – and I restored the cities to the king, my lord, from the habiru out of service to him, and I made the habiru go away. So the king, my lord, should rejoice concerning Etakkama, his servant. I serve the king, my lord, together with all of my brothers.

(l.e. 24') I serve the king, my lord, but Biryawaza caused all [your] land[s] to go out of (your) control. His intention] is to do violence, but I am [your servant] in perpetuity.

===== EA 197. Mušihuna [client letter] =====
(o 001') [ ... sa]id t[o ...] your servant in A-[...] “[You gave] his horses and his chariots to the habiru, and you did not [give them] to the king, my lord.” {Can. Who} am I but a servant? Everything that is mine is for the king. Biridašwa saw this deed and incited the town of Yanʾuam against me. He shut the city gate behind me and captured the chariots from the town of ʿAštartu. He gave them to the habiru and did not give them to the king, my lord. The king of Buṣruna and the kign of Halunnu saw (this), and they waged war with Biridašwa against me. They said: "Come! Let us kill Biryawaza. We will not dispatch him to[the land of Ta]hšu."But I got away from their [control] and stayed in [the land of Apu and] Damascus. When [they saw] that I was serving [the king, my lord, they] were saying, "We are [servants of the king of the land of Ha]tti," but I was saying, "I am a servant of the king of the land of Egypt." And Arzawya went to Qid[šu]. He brought (along) ʿAḏi[ri]’s troops, and he seized Šaddu. He gave it over to the habiru; he did not give it to the king, my lord.

(r 031') Look, Etakkama caused the land of Qidšu to go out of (the king's) control, and this one, Arzawya, together with Biridašwa, is (now) causing the land of Apu to go out of (the king's) control. So the king should take care of his land lest hostile men capture it. Since my brothers are hostile to me, I am guarding Kumidu, the city of the king, my lord. The king should make peace for his servant; the king should not abandon his servant, [so that] the kings of [the land of Qidšu] and the land of Apu see i[f ... ... ... ...]

(l.e. 001') [...] I have seen the regular troops.

The translation "[the land of Apu and] Damascus." is inaccurate and can cause confusion. It can be misunderstood as Apu and Damascus being two entities in a combined land. The transliteration ^{kur}a-pi₂ and ^{uru}di-maš-qa, translates as Land of Api and city of Dimašqa, a more precise reading showing that the man went to the Land of Api and stayed in the city of Damascus.

== See also ==
- Biridašwa, letter 197, Title: "Biryawaza's plight"
- Etakkama
