= Menkheperraseneb I =

- High Priest of Amun
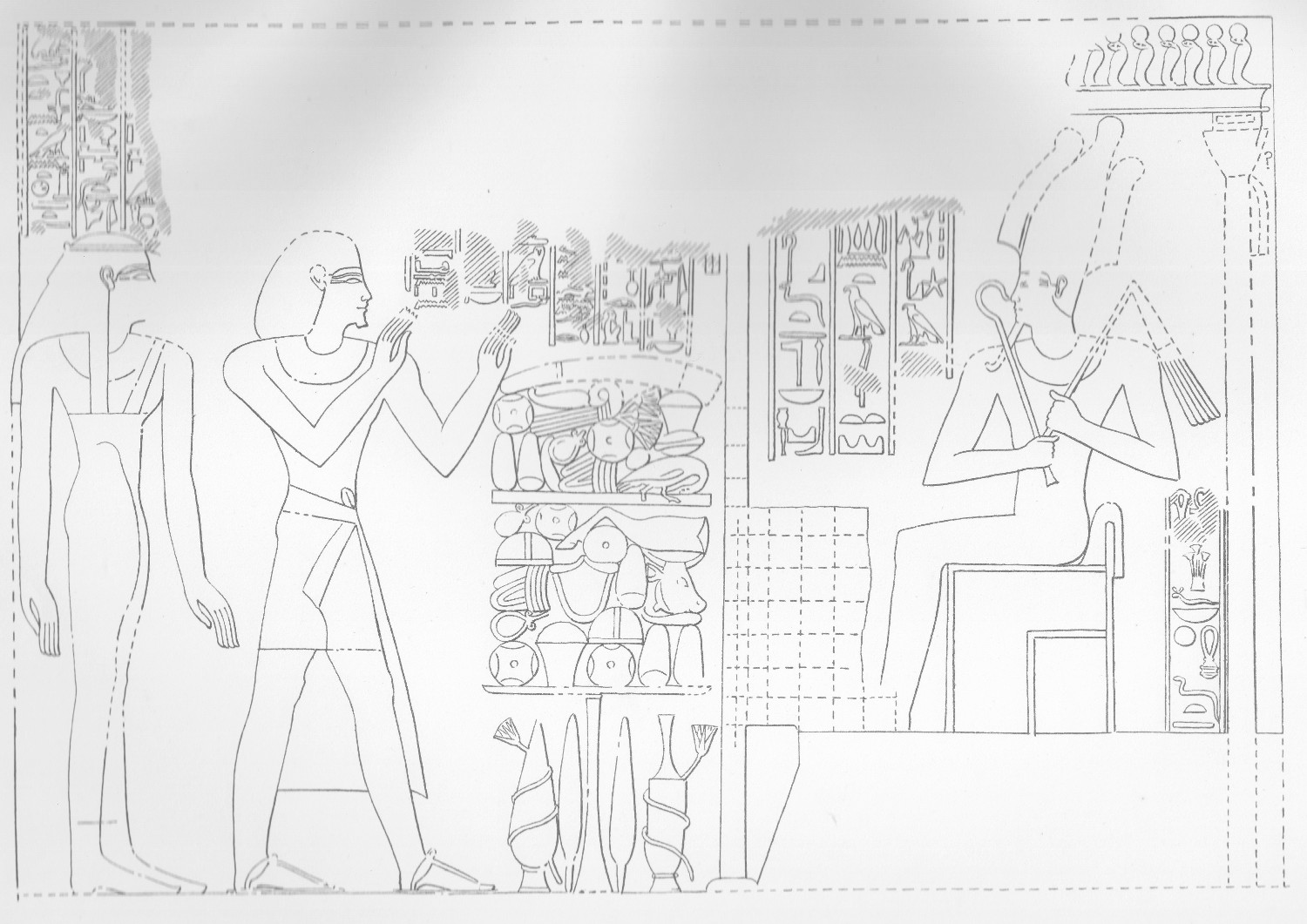
- Drawing of a relief from Menkheperreseneb's tomb TT86, depicting Menkheperreseneb (center) and his wife (left) before Osiris (right).
Egyptian name
N5 mn L1 S29 n bmn-ḫpr-rˁ-snb
Menkheperrê is healthy
- Dynasty: 18th dynasty
- Pharaoh: Thutmose III and Amenhotep II
- Burial: TT86

Menkheperraseneb I was a high official under the reign of king (pharaoh) Thutmose III and Amenhotep II. He was a High Priest of Amun and therefore the most important religious official in his days.

== Identity ==
Menkheperraseneb was a son of a High Priest of Amun named Min-nakht (or Nakht-Min); passing of offices and ranks to sons from fathers was common practice. Menkheperraseneb was married to a woman named Ta-nj-Iwnw (also read Ta-Iwnw). Further details about his family are not known.

== Office and career ==
Menkheperraseneb held high official positions. He held such titles as "Member of the Elite", "Hereditary Noble", "Mayor", "Royal Seal-Bearer", "Overseer of the King's Granaries", "Overseer of the Foreign Lands", "Eye of the Treasure House", and "High Priest of Amun".

His tomb inscription shows Menkheperraseneb in several scenes as he supervises the arrival of delegations from Crete, Hatti, and Syria. The visitors bring precious trade ware such as carpets, donkeys, etc.

== Tomb ==
Menkheperraseneb I was buried in Thebes, in the tomb TT86. Until recently, it was believed that Menkheperraseneb was the owner of two tombs, TT86 and TT112, but Egyptologist Peter Dorman was able to show genealogical discrepancies within the family trees around Menkheperraseneb. The tomb inscriptions of TT86 reveal that Menkheperraseneb had a nephew, who was also called Menkheperraseneb, but married to a different woman, Nebet-ta. Thus, Menkheperraseneb I was obviously interred in TT86 and Menkheperreseneb II in TT112.

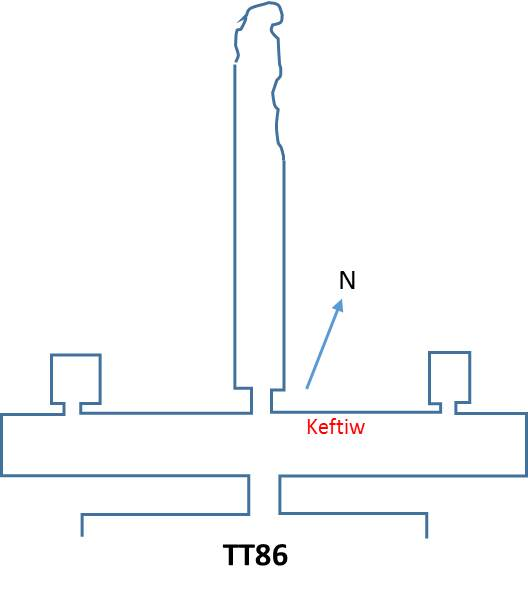
Plan of TT86

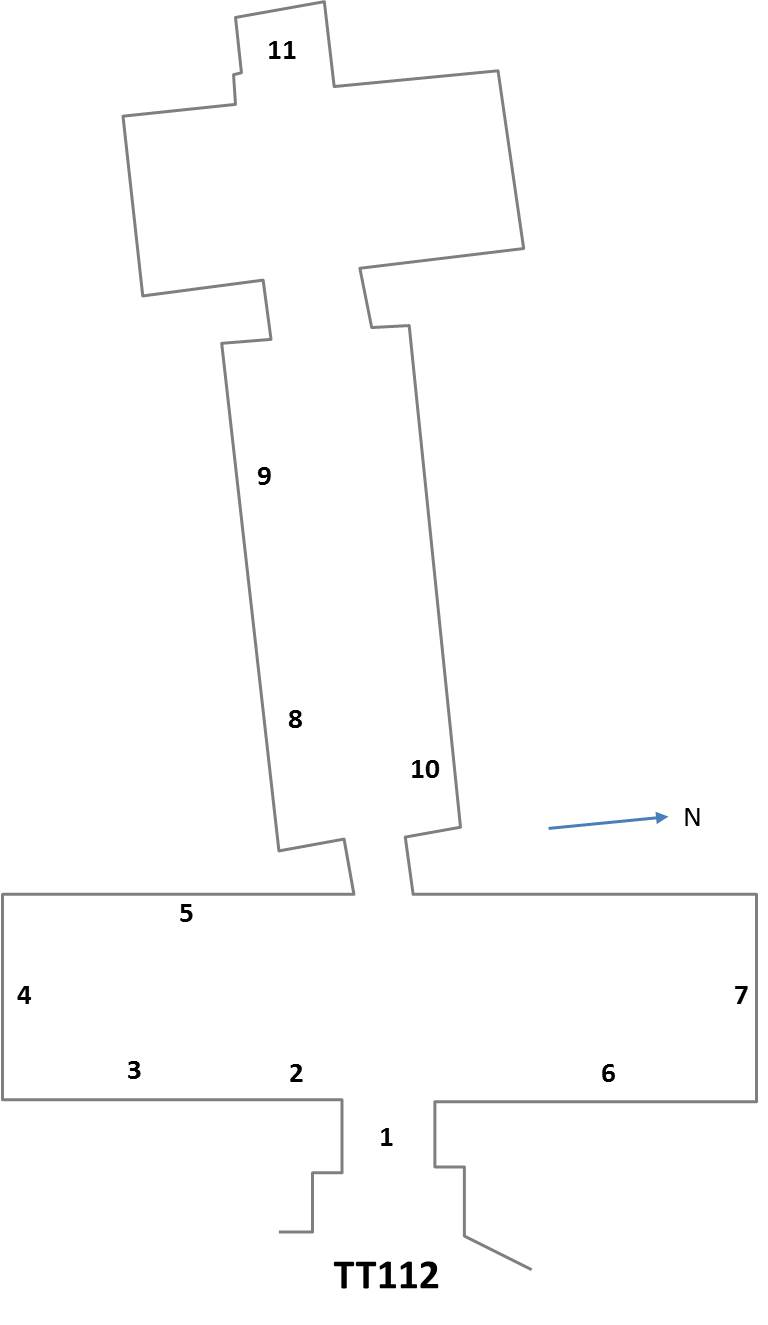
Plan of TT112

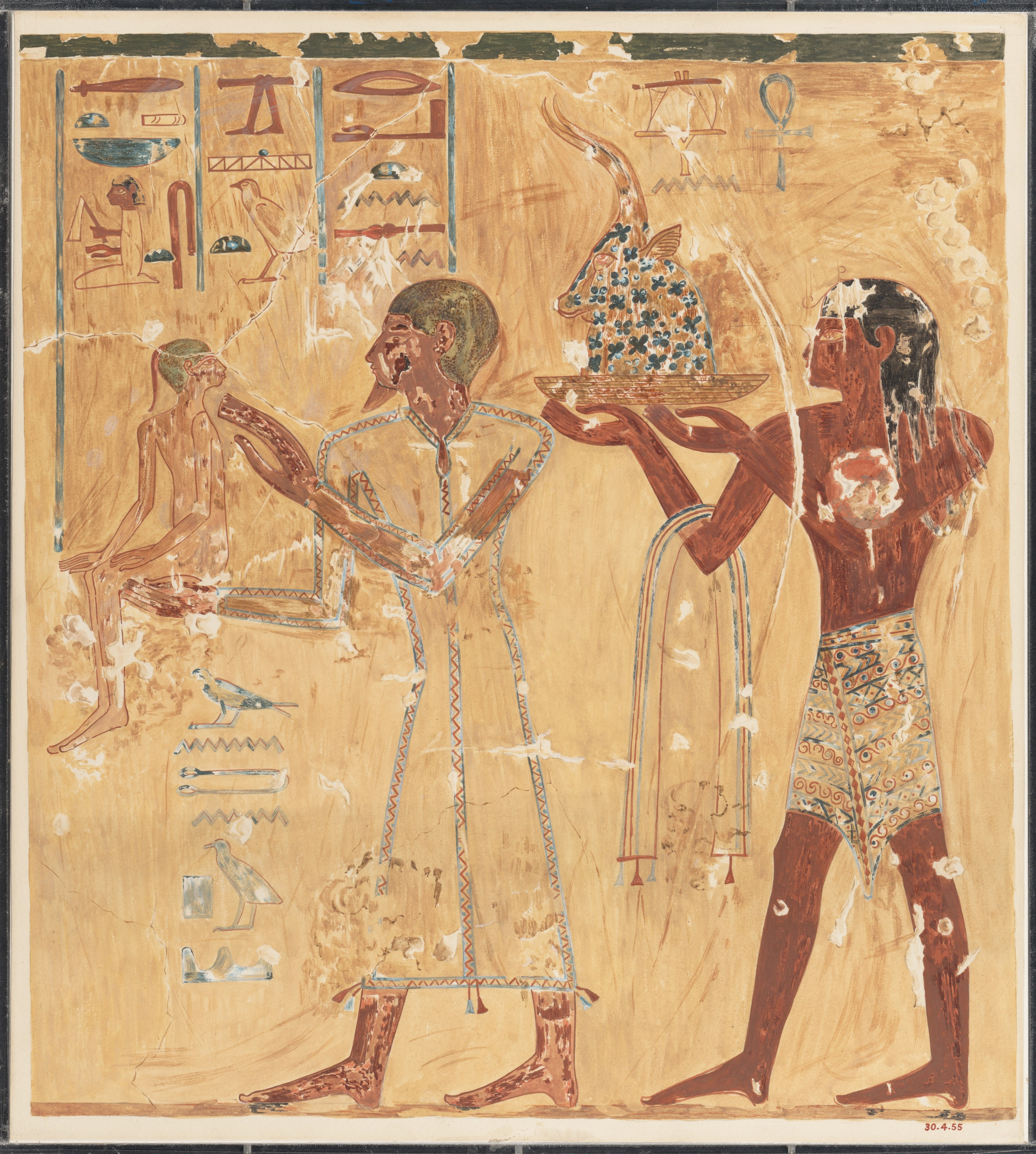
A painting from TT86 depicting the prince of Tunip and a Minoan bearing tribute

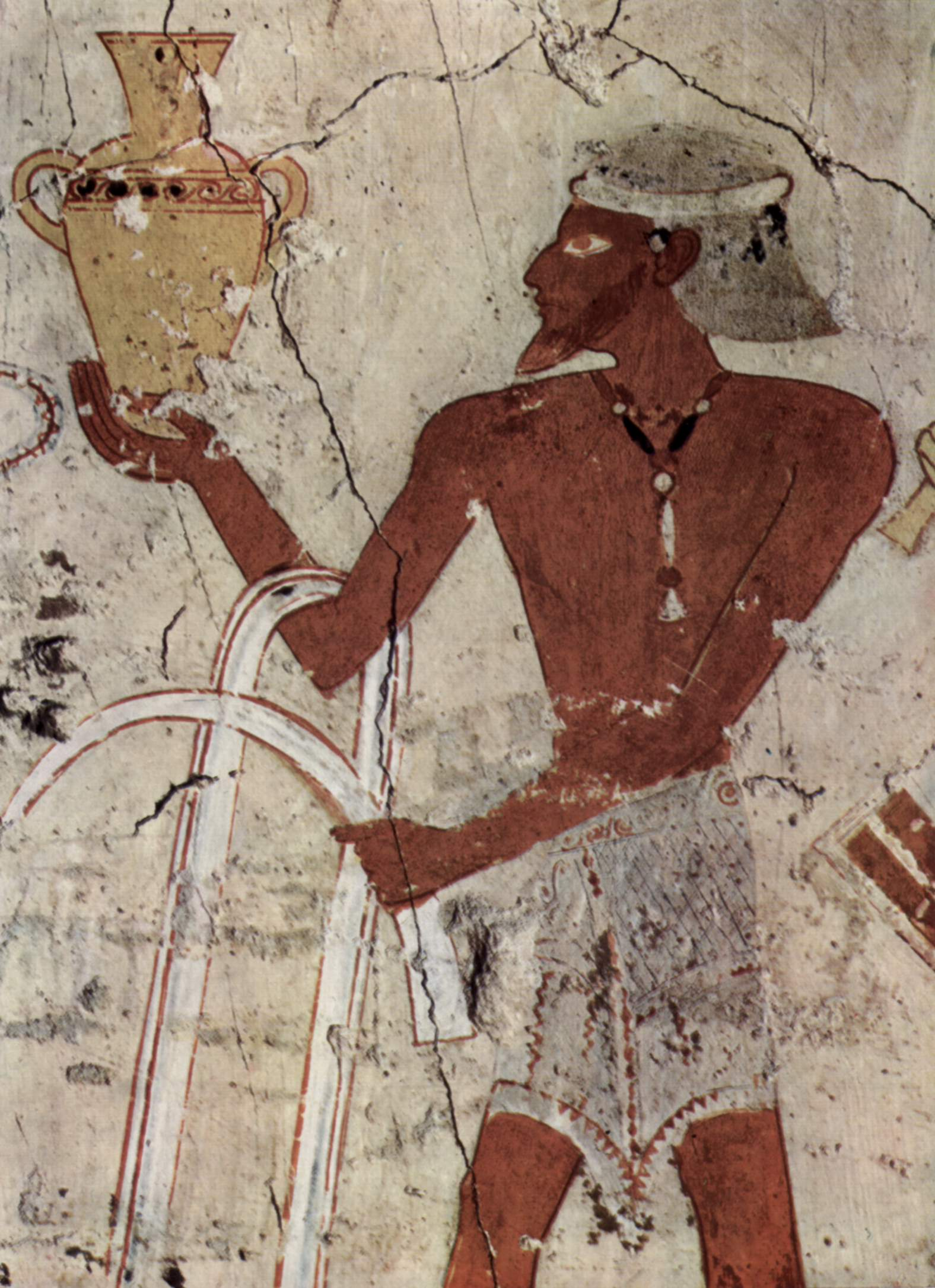
A painting from TT86 depicting a foreign man carrying a vase

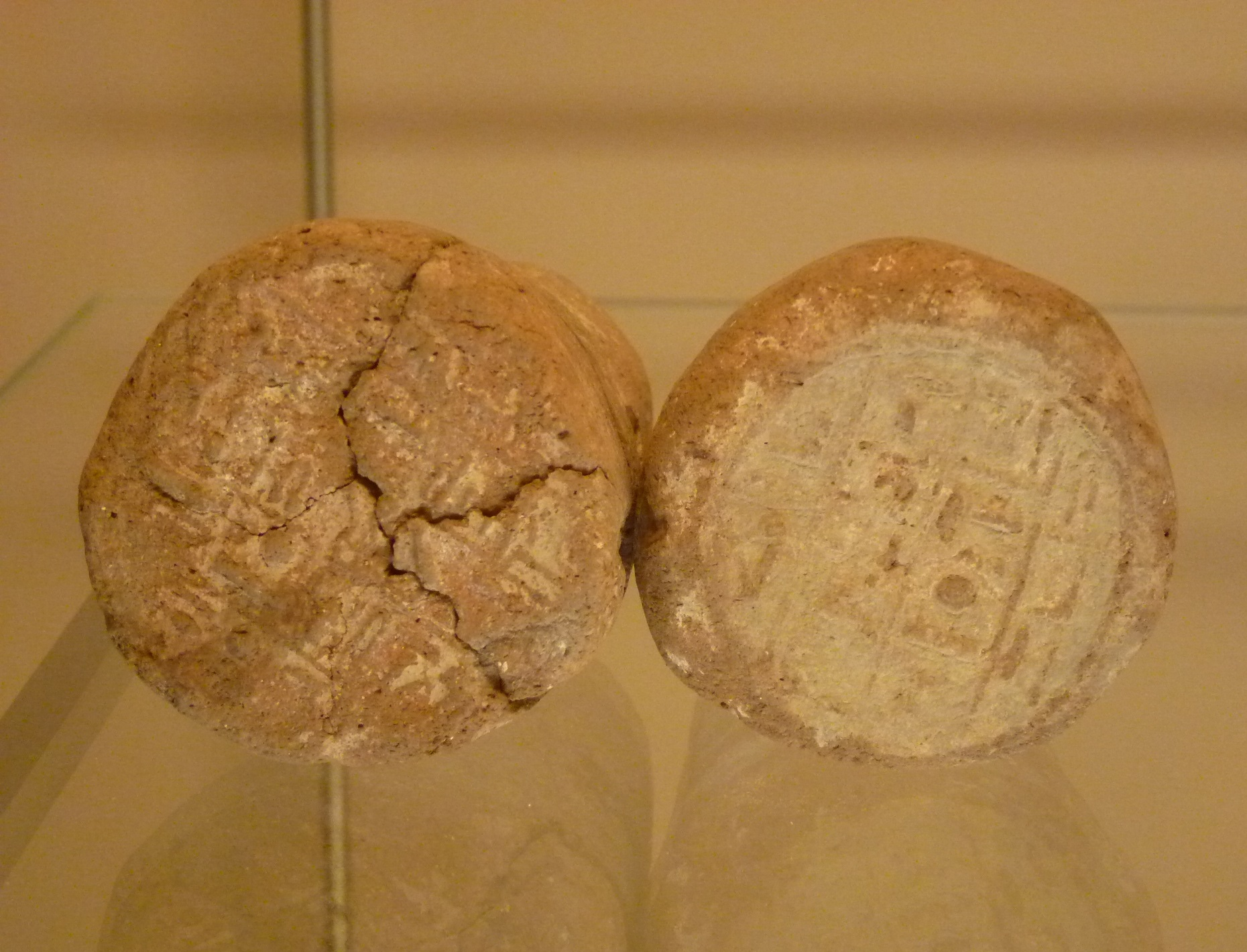
Bases of funerary cones of Menkheperraseneb
