= Menkheperreseneb II =

Ancient Egyptian high priest of Amun

- High Priest of Amun
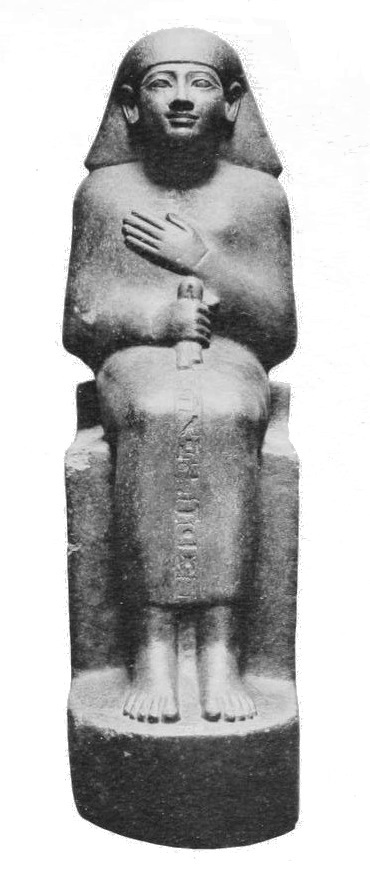
- The Second Priest of Amun Menkheperraseneb (BM 708): he may be Menkheperreseneb II in his early career (see text)
Egyptian name
ra mn L1 s n b
- Predecessor: Menkheperraseneb I
- Dynasty: 18th Dynasty
- Pharaoh: Thutmose III and Amenhotep II
- Burial: TT112, Thebes
- Father: Hepu
- Mother: Taiunet

Menkheperreseneb II was a High Priest of Amun, Superintendent of the Gold and silver treasuries, and Chief of the Overseers of Craftsmen. He served at the time of Thutmose III and Amenhotep II, and may have been buried in his Theban tomb, TT112.

== Biography ==
Menkheperreseneb II was a son of the charioteer of His Majesty Hepu and the King's Nurse Taiunet. Until recently, it was believed that there was only one High Priest of Amun called Menkheperraseneb; in 1994, Egyptologist Peter Dorman showed that the HPA were actually two: Menkheperreseneb II was indeed the nephew and successor of Menkheperraseneb I, brother of Hepu and owner of tomb TT86.

== Attestations ==
Apart from his tomb TT112, there are many monuments bearing the name of a "High Priest of Amun Menkheperraseneb"; unfortunately, for almost all of these, it is not possible to determine whether they belonged to "the elder" or to "the younger". This is the case for numerous funerary cones scattered in many museums throughout the world (e.g. University College London, Metropolitan Museum of Art of New York, the Archeological Civic Museum of Bologna), a vase from Saqqara, and a scarab upon which he as the Overseer of the Crafts of Amun.

A sitting statue of a Second Priest of Amun Menkheperraseneb (the "Second Priest" is the rank immediately below the "High Priest") in the British Museum (BM 708) may refer to either priest in the early stage of his career, although it may suggest an unrelated individual. In the Cairo Museum is an inscribed statue of a Priest of Amun Menkheperraseneb, son of Amenemhat (CG 42125), which was long attributed to either priest, now is likely to belong to a different individual. Moreover, another statue (Brooklyn Museum 36613), inscribed with the cartouches of Thutmose III, surely belongs to a High Priest of Amun Menkheperraseneb, although it is not possible to determine which of the two.

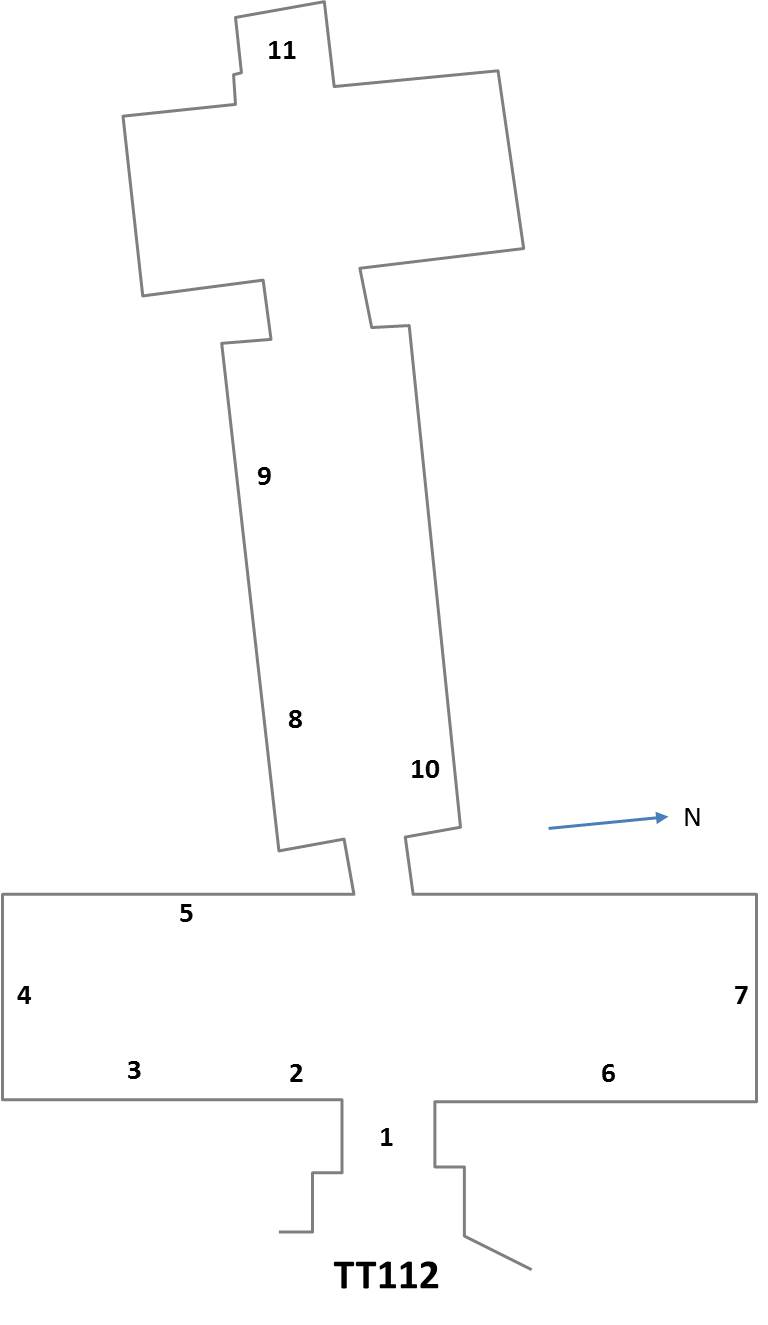
Plan of Menkheperraseneb II's tomb, TT112
