= Šuppiluliuma I =

King of the Hittites

- King of the Hittites
- Reign: c. 1350–1322 BC
- Predecessor: Tudhaliya III
- Successor: Arnuwanda II
- Died: c. 1322 BC
- Spouse: Ḫenti; Malnigal
- Issue: Arnuwanda II; Telipinu; Piyaššili; Zannanza; Muršili II; Muwatti
- Father: Tudhaliya III (adoptive)

The Hittite Empire at its greatest extent under Suppiluliuma I (c. 1350–1322 BC)

Šuppiluliuma I (died c. 1322 BC), also Suppiluliuma (/ˌsʌpɪlʌliˈuːmə/) or Suppiluliumas (/-məs/), was an ancient Hittite king (r. c. 1350–1322 BC).

Even before assuming the throne, Šuppiluliuma distinguished himself as a military commander by protecting and reclaiming Hittite territories after a period of foreign attacks. Once becoming king he continued his program of consolidation and expansion, both in Anatolia and Syria, with a great deal of success. Victories over a major rival, the Upper-Mesopotamian kingdom of Mittani, led to the extension of Hittite authority over a bevy of petty kingdoms in northern Syria, the installation of the Hittite king's younger sons as local viceroys at Aleppo and Carchemish, and the rump of the Mittanian state becoming, effectively, a dependency of the Hittite Kingdom.

Relations with Egypt vacillated between friendship and hostility, eventually culminating in the Zannanza Affair in which Šuppiluliuma was persuaded to send one of his sons to marry the widowed queen of Egypt and assume its throne. However, the murder of this Hittite prince resulted in a long period of Hittite-Egyptian hostility, and captives that Šuppiluliuma had taken caused an outbreak of plague which ravaged Hittite society for at least two decades. Despite all his successes, Šuppiluliuma's son, Muršili II, blamed the Hittite's misfortune as being the result of his father's cruelty.

== Origins ==
Šuppiluliuma's origins are unclear. A statement in the genealogy of his grandson Ḫattušili III was long taken to indicate that Šuppiluliuma’s father, and Ḫattušili III's great-grandfather, was Ḫattušili II. However, the terminology involved (which when taken literally would indicate that Ḫattušili III was the great-grandson of Ḫattušili II) might have indicated more distant descent, and the Ḫattušili in question might have been the famous Ḫattušili I at the dawn of Hittite power in the late 17th century BC. The discovery of seal impressions naming Šuppiluliuma as the son of Tudḫaliya III (sometimes called II) led to the discarding of the previous hypothesis by most scholars. Most scholars now concluded that Šuppiluliuma was the son of his predecessor, Tudḫaliya III, whom he had long served as a military commander. However, the description of Šuppiluliuma's first wife Ḫenti as the "great queen, daughter of the great king, the hero," has resulted in her identification as the daughter of Tudḫaliya III, making Šuppiluliuma the son-in-law and possibly adopted son of that king.

== Generalship ==
According to the Deeds of Šuppiluliuma composed by his son and second successor Muršili II, Šuppiluliuma served as the adviser and chief military commander to his predecessor Tudḫaliya III, helping effect the king's recovery of his lands from Šamuḫa, where the court had established itself for greater security from enemy attack.

Tudḫaliya and Šuppiluliuma waged a successful campaign against the Kaška in the north, then intervened to recover control over and protect the regions of Kaššiya and the Ḫulana River Land to the west and southwest, striking back at their invaders. After dealing with a new threat from the Kaška under Piyapili, Tudḫaliya and Šuppiluliuma, had to fight King Karanni (or Lanni) of Azzi-Ḫayaša in the northeast. Karanni had invaded Hittite territory and even threatened Šamuḫa, but was defeated, Tudḫaliya and Šuppiluliuma invading Azzi-Ḫayaša in turn. A battle at Kummaḫa (probably Kemah) seems to have resulted in a Hittite victory, as Azzi-Ḫayaša is later found as a Hittite vassal.

After these successes in the north, Tudḫaliya seems to have been able to return to the Hittite capital, Ḫattuša. He sent Šuppiluliuma southwest against the Arzawa confederacy, and Šuppiluliuma was victorious in several battles, recovering the city of Tuwanuwa (probably Tyana), which had been occupied by the enemy.

The Hittite Kingdom had recovered much lost ground, but Arzawa remained a dangerous enemy, and Muršili II would relate that it took Šuppiluliuma some 20 years (presumably extending into his own reign) to settle affairs in the west. The recovery had clearly begun before the end of Tudḫaliya III’s reign, but credit for much of it was given to Šuppiluliuma.

== Accession to the throne ==
When Tudḫaliya III died, the throne should have been inherited by his son Tudḫaliya the Younger, to whom Šuppiluliuma and other members of the Hittite elite had sworn oaths of loyalty. It is not clear whether or not Tudḫaliya the Younger actually ascended the throne, before he was murdered, together with some of his brothers, by the supporters of Šuppiluliuma. Long associated with Tudḫaliya as his chief military commander, Šuppiluliuma I now became king. The murder of Tudḫaliya the Younger was later identified by an oracle as a cause for the outbreak of plague that ravaged the Hittite kingdom for two decades, into the reign of Šuppiluliuma's son and second successor Muršili II. In accordance with tradition, the widow of the preceding king, Dadu-Ḫeba, continued to enjoy the title of chief queen, Tawananna, until her death.

== Family ==
=== Queen Ḫenti ===
Šuppiluliuma's first wife was Ḫenti, apparently the daughter of Tudḫaliya III. After the death of her mother or stepmother Dadu-Ḫeba, Ḫenti became the Tawananna. She is believed to have been the mother of all of Šuppiluliuma's "legitimate" sons:

- Arnuwanda II, who was Šuppiluliuma's designated heir (tuḫkanti) and eventual successor.
- Telipinu, who was appointed priest (and governor) of Kizzuwatna and later became vassal king of Aleppo in Syria.
- Piyaššili, also called Šarri-Kušuḫ, who became vassal king of Carchemish as master of the formerly Mittanian lands west of the Euphrates.
- Zannanza, who disappeared en route to Egypt to marry a widowed Egyptian queen, possibly Ankhesenamun.
- Muršili II, who became king of the Hittites after his older brother, Arnuwanda II.

Šuppiluliuma also had daughters, of whom Muwatti was married to Mašḫuiluwa, the king of Mira-Kuwaliya in Arzawa, while another daughter, name unknown, was married to Šattiwaza, the king of Mittani.

Additionally, Šuppiluliuma's sister, name unknown, was married to Huqqana, the king of Azzi-Ḫayaša. Šuppiluliuma's brother Zida (or Zidana) was appointed Commander of the Guard.

A badly damaged text from the reign of her son Muršili II implies that Ḫenti may have been banished by her husband to the land of Aḫḫiyawa. The motivation for this decision remains unclear. Suggested possibilities include the desirability of a marriage alliance with the Kassite king of Babylon, or conflict between Ḫenti and Šuppiluliuma's new Babylonian wife after that marriage alliance was concluded.

=== Malnigal ===
Šuppiluliuma's last queen was a Babylonian princess possibly named Malnigal, who apparently assumed the title of Tawananna in place of her original name. She was the daughter of a Babylonian king, probably Burna-Buriaš II. The Babylonian Tawananna would survive a decade into the reign of Šuppiluliuma's son and second successor Muršili II, who would demote and banish her after an oracle confirmed that she was guilty of causing the death of the king's wife Gaššulawiya.

== Reign ==
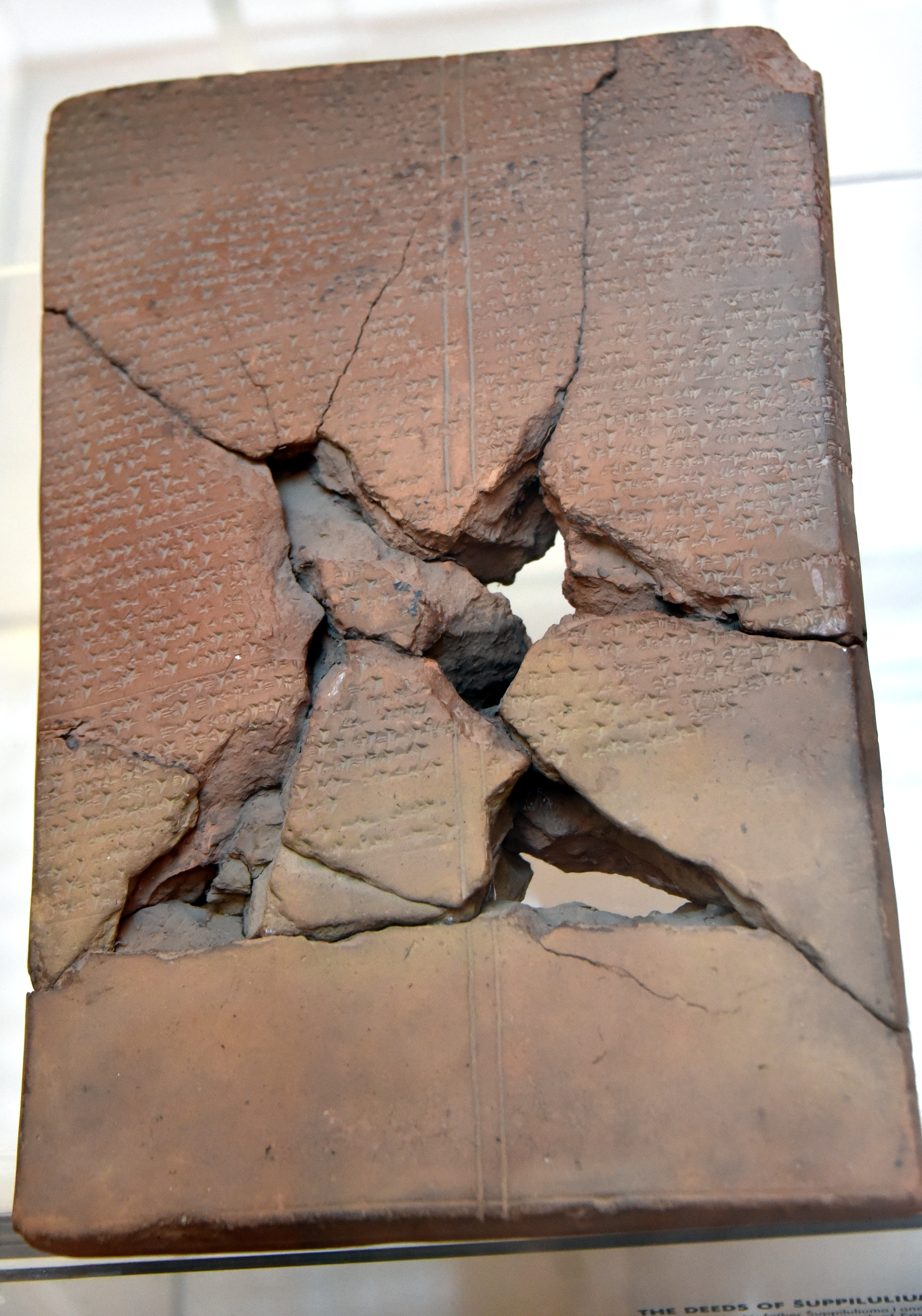
Deeds of Suppiluliuma I, 14th century BC, from Hattusa

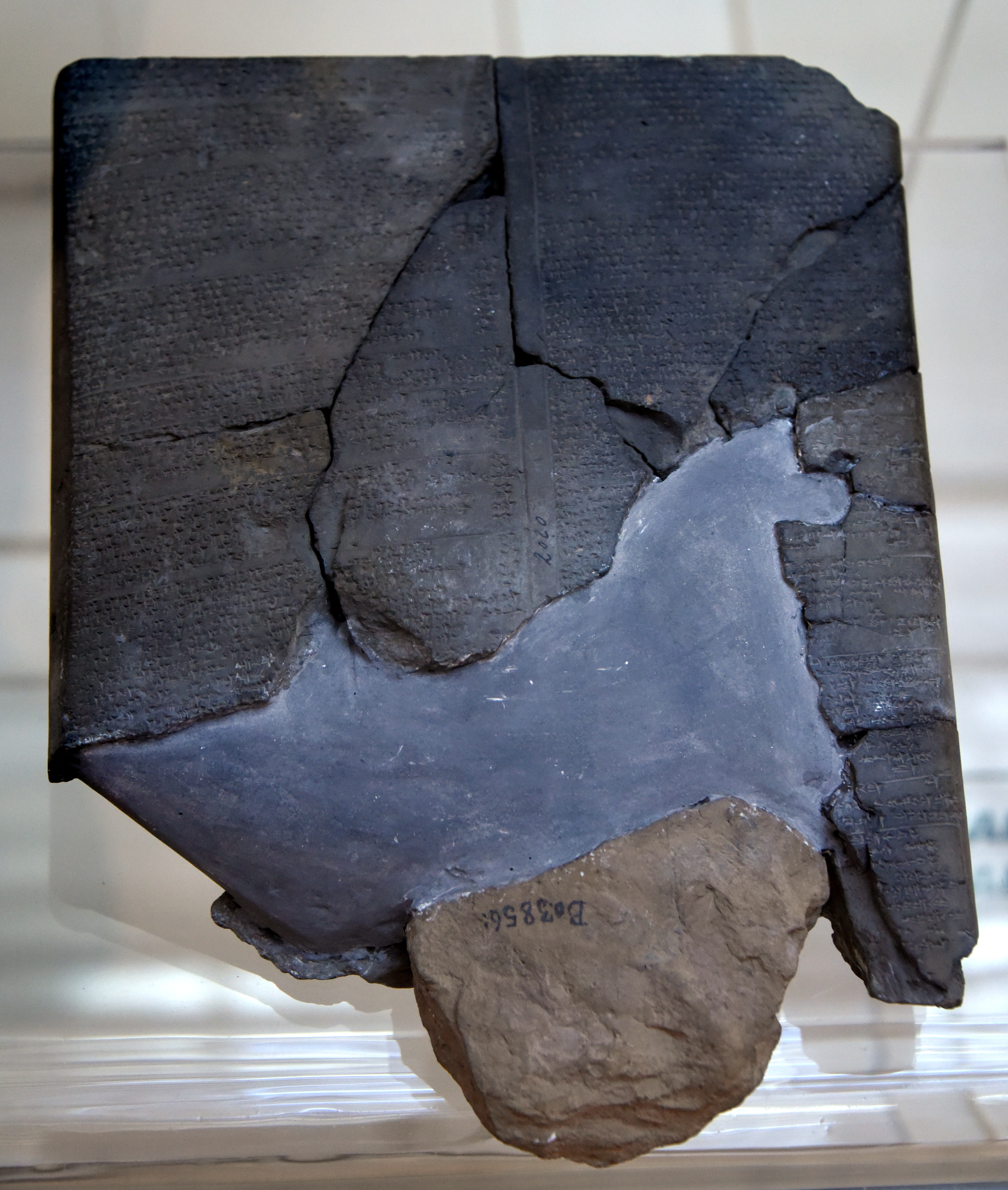
Šuppiluliuma I and Hukkana treaty, 13th century BC, from Hattusa

=== Anatolia ===
Šuppiluliuma continued his efforts to establish a Hittite supremacy in western Anatolia, providing asylum to the expelled heir to the throne of Mira-Kuwaliya, Mašḫuiluwa. Having married his daughter Muwatti to Mašḫuiluwa, Šuppiluliuma proceeded to make his new son-in-law the vassal king of Mira-Kuwaliya. When the young Manapa-Tarḫunta of the Šeḫa River Land was expelled by his brothers and fled to Karkiša, Šuppiluliuma ensured his safety by sending presents to the ruler of Karkiša and the exile was eventually restored to his throne by Šuppiluliuma’s son Muršili II. The defeat of the Hittite commander Ḫimuili by the Arzawan leader Anzapaḫḫaddu, who had refused the demands to release Hittite captives, forced Šuppiluliuma to intervene personally and enforce the demands. Šuppiluliuma established his lieutenant Ḫanutti as governor of the region, and the latter secured the submission of Lalanda and the pillage of Ḫapalla.

At some point late in his reign, perhaps not long before the Zannanza Affair, Šuppiluliuma waged a war against the Kaška in the north, temporarily subjugating and pacifying a portion of their land and establishing Hittite outposts there. This was followed by a Kaška revolt, in which many Hittites were slain and the Hittite fortresses came under attack. Šuppiluliuma and two of his generals struck back, invading and pillaging enemy territory, and restoring Hittite control over the northwestern land of Tummana (classical Domanitis?). The northern front remained unstable, and at the very end of his reign Šuppiluliuma is found campaigning against the Kaška again. He met with ostensible success, but it was impossible to consolidate these gains.

Apparently seeking to secure his northeastern frontier before pursuing his ambitions to the southeast, Šuppiluliuma arranged a marriage between his sister and Huqqana, supposedly making the latter king of his homeland, Azzi-Ḫayaša. In addition to the usual content of such treaties with vassal kings, this one featured extensive morality clauses. This treaty was probably concluded early in Šuppiluliuma’s reign.

=== Syria and Mesopotamia ===
Apart from consolidating his position in the northeast and west, Šuppiluliuma sought to recover control over Kizzuwatna and Tegarama, areas to the south and east, which had come under the indirect control of the Kingdom of Mittani centered on Upper Mesopotamia. An initial Hittite strike against Mittani failed, its king Tušratta claiming victory in a letter sent to Amenhotep III of Egypt, along with a representative share of the booty. Learning from his failure, Šuppiluliuma apparently made an alliance with a rival Mittanian royal, Artatama II and may have sought to keep Egypt, at this point a Mittanian ally, out of any following conflict by maintaining friendly diplomatic relations with it. Šuppiluliuma also established an alliance with Kassite Babylonia, and at some point married a Babylonian princess, his last queen.

==== One-Year War ====
Apparently after lengthy preparations, Šuppiluliuma attacked Mittani again in the so-called One-Year War. Responding to an appeal for help against Mittani from a petty king of Nuḫašši, Šarrupši, Šuppiluliuma launched a direct assault on Mittani, overrunning its vassal Išuwa, before capturing and plundering the Mittanian capital Waššukanni. Tušratta, unable to resist, fled to rally elsewhere. At this point, Šuppiluliuma created a certain Antaratli the vassal king of Alši in the northernmost part of Mesopotamia.

Šuppiluliuma then crossed the Euphrates into Syria, conquering the smaller kingdoms that had recognized Mittanian suzerainty there, including Aleppo, Mukiš (centered on Alalaḫ), Niya, Araḫtu, Qatna, and Nuḫašši. Carchemish, however, remained firmly under Mittanian control. Šuppiluliuma enticed the small but wealthy kingdom of Ugarit, which had loose ties to Egypt, into becoming an ally through common hostility to Mukiš and Nuḫašši, King Niqmaddu II of Ugarit eventually recognizing Šuppiluliuma's suzerainty; having conquered these, Šuppiluliuma rewarded Ugarit with some of their lands. Šarrupši of Nuḫašši, who had betrayed his Hittite alliance, was driven from his throne, but later his grandson Tette was installed as a vassal king by Šuppiluliuma.

Although he had intended to bypass Kadesh, an Egyptian dependency, Šuppiluliuma was provoked into battle by its king Šutatarra. The Hittites were victorious, and the king and his family were carried off into captivity. Later, Šuppiluliuma allowed the return of Šutatarra’s son Aitakkama to rule Kadesh as a Hittite vassal. For the time being, Egypt apparently did not respond to the provocation (Šuppiluliuma would later claim that he took Kadesh from Mittani), and Šuppiluliuma could take great satisfaction in all he had achieved in single year of war.

==== Six-Year War ====
Late in his reign, Šuppiluliuma sought to consolidate his gains and expand farther at the expense of Mittani or eliminate it altogether, as Tušratta was defeated but unconquered. This led to the so-called Six-Year War. It was conducted mostly by Šuppiluluma's deputies, especially his son Telipinu, the priest of Kizzuwatna, who had been made vassal king of Aleppo by his father. Telipinu succeeded in defeating an attack launched across the Euphrates by the Mittanians. However, while Telipinu was recalled for a meeting with his father at Uda (probably Hydē), the Mittanians renewed their attack, while an Egyptian force attacked the Hittite dependency of Kadesh. Sending his eldest son Arnuwanda and his Commander of the Guard Zida ahead, Šuppiluliuma gathered additional forces and headed to Syria. Meeting with success, he besieged of Carchemish and finally captured it, installing his son Piyaššili, also known as Šarri-Kušuḫ as its vassal king. The murder of Tušratta by one of his younger sons led to further conflict within Mittani, allowing the Hittites to consolidate their gains in Syria and on the Euphrates.

The weakening of Mittani was quickly exploited by its former vassals, Assyria and Alši, while Tušratta’s son Šattiwaza aimed to recover his father's throne from Artatama II and the latter's son Šuttarna III. Šattiwaza was forced to seek refuge first in Kassite Babylonia, then with his father's former enemy Šuppiluliuma in Ḫatti. Šuppiluliuma married one of his daughters to Šattiwaza, bound him with an oath, and dispatched him to recover his father's kingdom with the help of a Hittite army led by Piyaššili (Šarri-Kušuḫ). The treaty concluded between Šuppiluliuma and Šattiwaza reads, in part:

Šuttarna, together with the chariot warriors, sought to kill Prince Šattiwaza. However, he escaped and came into the presence of My Majesty, Šuppiluliuma, King of Ḫatti, Hero, Beloved of the Storm-god. I, Geat King, spoke thus: "The Storm-god has decided his legal case. As I have taken up Šattiwaza, son of King Tušratta, in my hand, I will seat him upon the throne of his father, so that the land of Mittani, the great land, does not go to ruin. I, Great King, King of Ḫatti, have given life to the land of Mittani for the sake of my daughter. I took up Šattiwaza, son of Tušratta, in my hand, and I gave him a daughter in marriage."

Šattiwaza and Piyaššili were successful, and Šattiwaza was established as king of what was left of Mittani (which was called Ḫanigalbat by the Assyrians). Although it was meant to be a great kingdom, the country was effectively reduced to becoming alternately the dependency of the Hittites and the Assyrians, until its final annexation by the Assyrian king Shalmaneser I (1265–1235 BC). Much of Mittani's earlier territory, and that of its dependencies, was now reorganized under Hittite control, such as the vassal kingdom of Aštata, centered on Emar. The Hittite vassals in Syria were left under the management of the Hittite princes ruling at Carchemish and Aleppo, who served effectively as the viceroys of the Hittite great king in the area.

=== Relations with Egypt ===
After the earlier amicable relations with Egypt, conflict eventually ensued over the petty kingdom of Amurru. Supported by troops from nomadic bands (Ḫabiru), its king ʿAbdi-Aširta had preyed upon his neighbors until finally being captured by a belated Egyptian military action. His son Aziru renewed the depredations on his neighbors, while protesting his innocence to their common overlord, the king of Egypt, whom he solicited for chariots and troops against possible Hittite aggression. Aziru was summoned to and detained in Egypt, until released to deal with Hittite incursions in the area. After briefly staying loyal to Egypt, Aziru built up alliances with the Hittite vassals Niqmaddu II of Ugarit and Aitakkama of Kadesh, and finally openly defied Egypt and became a vassal of Šuppiluliuma. The new Hittite vassals preyed upon the neighboring dependencies of Egypt even more eagerly than before.

The Egyptian attack on Kadesh during the absence of Šuppiluliuma and Telipinu from Syria appears to have been an attempt to redress or avenge the Hittite advance into the Egyptian sphere of influence. When Šuppiliuliuma returned to Syria to besiege Carchemish, he dispatched two of his generals to raid and pillage the Egyptian dependency Amka in the region of Damascus in retribution.

==== Zannanza affair ====
Still at the siege of Carchemish and expecting another Egyptian attack in response, Šuppiluliuma was surprised to receive an unusual marriage proposal instead. It came from an envoy of a sonless Egyptian queen designated in the Hittite sources Daḫamunzu, which is not a name, but actually a rendition of Egyptian tȝ-ḥmt-nsw, "the king’s wife". This woman who was the widow of a king called Nipḫururia, a rendition of the throne name of either Akhenaten (Neferkheprure), or Tutankhamun (Nebkheprure). Although there is plenty of debate over which pharaoh's widow was involved, most scholars tend to identify her as Ankhesenamun, the widow and possibly sister of Tutankhamun. This identification is assumed to be correct in the treatment below; the leading alternative for the widowed queen is Akhenaten's widow Nefernefruaten-Nefertiti, who reigned as queen regnant after her husband's death. Egyptologists Colleen Manassa and John Darnell stated:

The identification of the king in the letter as Tutankhamun, the only logical alternative, implies that the widow is Ankheseneamun, and all other available evidence supports such a conclusion.

Having no sons and unwilling to take one of her subjects as husband (the most prominent options might have been Viceroy of Kush Huy, vizier Ay and generalissimo Horemheb, the two latter became kings subsequently), the widowed queen, here assumed to be Ankhesenamun, asked the Hittite great king Šuppiluliuma to send one of his sons to Egypt to become her husband and king. The relevant exchanges are recorded in the Deeds of Šuppiluliuma, composed by Šuppiluliuma's son and second successor, Muršili II. Ankhesenamun initiated the exchange by sending a letter expressing her distress and making her request:

My husband has died and I have no son. They say about you that you have many sons. You might give me one of your sons to become my husband. I would not wish to take one of my subjects as a husband... I am afraid.

Upon hearing Ankhesenamun's request, Šuppiluliuma exclaimed:

Nothing like this has happened to me in my entire life!... Go and bring thou the true word back to me! Maybe they deceive me! Maybe in fact they do have a son of their lord!

Šuppiluliuma consulted with his council and dispatched his chamberlain Ḫattuša-ziti to Egypt to ascertain the facts. Upon realizing Šuppiluliuma's wariness of her intentions, Ankhesenamun replied, by way of Ḫattuša-ziti and an Egyptian envoy named Ḫani:

Why didst thou say "they deceive me" in that way? Had I a son, would I have written about my own and my country's shame to a foreign land? Thou didst not believe me and hast even spoke thus to me! He who was my husband has died. A son I have not! Never shall I take a servant of mine and make him my husband! I have written to no other country, only to thee have I written! They say thy sons are many: so give me one son of thine! To me he will be husband, but to Egypt he will be king.

After Šuppiluliuma heard Ankhesenamun's angry response, he remained skeptical and wary. He expressed this to the Egyptian envoy Ḫani, accusing Ankhesenamun of having ulterior motives:

...You keep asking me for a son of mine as if it were my duty. He will in some way become a hostage, but king you will not make him!

After further assurances from the Egyptian envoy Ḫani, Šuppiluliuma eventually agreed to Ankhesenamun's proposal. He selected his son Zannanza as Ankhesenamun's husband and Egypt's would-be king, and Zannanza was duly sent off to Egypt. According to Muršili II, Šuppiluliuma eventually learned that his son had been killed en route to Egypt:

They brought this tablet, they spoke thus: "... killed Zannanza," and brought word: "Zannanza died." And when my father heard of the slaying of Zannanza, he began to lament for Zannanza.

While the text is broken where it would have indicated the murderers of Zannanza, Šuppiluliuma clearly considered the Egyptians responsible, addressing the gods:

Oh gods! I did no evil, yet the people of Egypt did this to me, and they also attacked the frontier of my country.

Assuming that Šuppiluliuma's prospective daughter-in-law was indeed Tutankhamun's widow Ankhesenamun, suspicion might naturally attach to Tutankhamun's successor, Ay, who seems to have ascended the Egyptian throne before the completion of negotiations between Šuppiluliuma and Ḫani, unbeknownst to them, and likely would have been threatened by the appearance of the would-be king Zannanza on the scene. Anticipating retaliation from the Hittites, the new pharaoh apparently denied all responsibility for the murder in a conciliatory missive to Šuppiluliuma, but the Hittite king rejected his excuses and threatened war in a draft reply found at Ḫattuša. The very fragmentary and heavily restored text reads, in part:

But now you always write as king of Egypt... When I was asked to provide a son for a husband... I did not know. I was prepared to send my son for the kingship, but I did not know that you were already on the throne... Regarding your writing to me, saying: "Your son died, but I did him no harm," that... you say every time... When the Queen of Egypt kept writing to me, you were not... But if you had taken the throne in the meantime, you could have sent my son home! ... your servant Ḫani held us responsible... What have you done with my son? ... Then perhaps you have killed my son! You continually praise your troops and charioteers, but I will mobilize my troops and charioteers, whatever army I have. For me the Stormgod, my Lord, is the king of all lands, and the Sungoddess of Arinna, my Mistress, the queen of all lands. They will come and the Storm God, my Lord, and the Sungoddess of Arinna, my Mistress, will pass judgement!

Adding to Šuppiluliuma's fury, the Egyptian messenger, Ḫani, had apparently attempted to deflect some of the responsibility for Zannanza's death, perhaps pointing to the previous Hittite attacks on Egyptian territory. Šuppiluliuma's draft letter addresses the new pharaoh's attempts to intimidate the Hittites away from a military response:

Regarding your writing to me: "If you lust for vengeance, I shall take away that lust for vengeance from you!" But it is not me from whom you must take away that lust for revenge, you must take it from the Stormgod, my Lord! ... Those who denied him (Zannanza) the rule, they should ... Regarding your writing to me: "If you write to me in brotherhood, then I will make friendship with you," ... why should I write about brotherhood?

The Plague Prayers of Muršili II complete the story:

And although the Hittites and the Egyptians had been put under the oath by the Storm-god of Ḫatti, the Hittites came to repudiate (the agreement), and suddenly the Hittites transgressed the oath. My father sent infantry an chariotry, and they attacked the border region of Egyptian territory in the land of Amka. He sent (them) again, and they attacked again. When the Egyptians became frightened, they came and actually asked my father for his son for kingship. When my father gave them his son, and when they took him off, they killed him. My father became hostile, went to Egyptian territory, and attacked Egyptian territory. He killed the infantry and chariotry of Egypt.
And at that time the Storm-god of Ḫatti, my Lord, gave my father the upper hand in the lawsuit (manifest in the armed conflict), so that he defeated the infantry and chariotry of Egypt. He killed them. When prisoners of war who had been captured were brought back to Ḫatti, the plague broke out among the prisoners of war and they [began] to die in great numbers. When the prisoners of war were carried off to Ḫatti, the prisoners of war introduced the plague into Ḫatti, and from that time people have been dying in Ḫatti. When I found the tablet mentioned earlier dealing with Egypt, I made an oracular inquiry of a god about it: "Has this matter discussed earlier been brought about the Storm-god of Ḫatti because the Egyptians and the Hittites had been put under oath by the Storm-god of Ḫatti?"

Thus, along with Šuppiluliuma's murder of Tudḫaliya the Younger and other sins, Muršili II determined that Šuppiluliuma's attacks on Egypt, despite the belief that the Egyptians had murdered Zannanza, were a cause for the outbreak of the plague (rabbit fever?) in the Hittite Kingdom. The plague is often considered the cause of death of Šuppiluliuma and of his eldest son and initial successor, Arnuwanda I.

Hittite New Kingdom royal family tree according to Trevor Bryce

Kantuzilli (Note: Scholars have suggested that Tudhaliya I/II was possibly a grandson of the Hittite king Huzziya II; the first Tudhaliya is now known to be the son of Kantuzzili (Bryce 1997, p. 131 suggested Himuili, but the new edition, Bryce 2005, p. 122, indicated Kantuzzili).)
Tudhaliya I/II (Note: Bryce (1997) does not consider it clear whether Tudhaliya I/II was one king or two (p. 133); the link points to Tudhaliya II. Among those who identify distinct kings Tudhaliya I and Tudhaliya II, Freu (2007) has Kantuzzili—his son Tudhaliya I—his son Hattusili II—his son Tudhaliya II (p. 311).)	Nikkalmati (Note: Bryce (1997), p. 139.)
Arnuwanda I	Asmunikal
Hattusili II? (Note: The existence of Hattusili II is doubted by many scholars (Bryce 1997, pp. 153–154; Bryce 2005, p. 141). Among those who accept the existence of Hattusili II, Freu (2007), p. 311, has Tudhaliya I—his son Hattusili II—his son Tudhaliya II.)	Tudhaliya III (Note: Bryce (1997), p. 158.)	Daduhepa (Note: Bryce (1997), p. 172.)	Zida (Note: Bryce (1997), p. 174.)
Tudhaliya the Younger (Note: Bryce (1997), p. 168.)	Henti (1)	Šuppiluliuma I	(2) Tawananna (Note: Also known as Malnigal; daughter of Burnaburias II of Babylonia (Bryce 1997, p. 173).)
Arnuwanda II	Telipinu (Note: ‘Great priest’ in Kizzuwadna and king (lugal) of Aleppo (Bryce 1997, p. 174).)	Sarri-Kusuh (Note: King (lugal) of Carchemish.) (Note: Bryce (1997), pp. 174, 203–204.)	Zannanza (Note: Zannanza died on his way to Egypt to marry a pharaoh's widow, probably Ankhesenpaaten, the widow of Tutankhamun (Bryce 1997, pp. 196–198).)	Gassulawiya (Note: Bryce (1997), p. 227.) (1)	Mursili II	(2) Tanuhepa (Note: Bryce (1997), p. 230.)
Talmi-Sarruma (Note: Bryce (1997), p. 220.)	Sahurunuwa (Note: Bryce (1997), p. 222.)	Muwatalli II	Halpasulupi (Note: Haas (2006), p. 91.)	Massanauzzi (Note: Massanauzzi married Masturi, king of the Seha River Land (Bryce 1997, p. 313).)	Hattusili III (Note: Bryce (1997), p. 296.)	Puduhepa (Note: Puduhepa was the daughter of the Kizzuwadnan priest Pentipsarri (Bryce 1997, p. 273).)
Ini-Tesub (Note: Bryce (1997), pp. 346, 363.)	Urhi-Tesub	Kurunta (Note: King (lugal) of Tarhuntassa (Bryce 1997, p. 296); apparently later Great King of Hatti (Bryce 1997, p. 354).)	Nerikkaili (Note: Nerikkaili married a daughter of Bentesina, king of Amurru (Bryce 1997, p. 294).)	numerous daughters (Note: Two daughters of Hattusili III were married to the pharaoh Ramesses II; one was given the Egyptian name Ma(hor)nefrure. Another, Gassuwaliya, married into the royal house of Amurru. Kilushepa was married to a king of Isuwa. A daughter married into the royal family of Babylon. A sister of Tudhaliya IV married Sausgamuwa, king of Amurru after his father Bentesina. From Bryce (1997), pp. 294 and 312.) and sons (Note: Bryce (1997), p. 332.)	Tudhaliya IV (Note: Bryce (1997), p. 363. Tudhaliya IV probably married a Babylonian princess, known by her title of Great Princess (dumu.sal gal) (Bryce 1997, pp. 294, 331).)
Talmi-Tesub (Note: Bryce (1997), p. 363.)	Arnuwanda III (Note: Bryce (1997), p. 361.)	Suppiluliuma II (Note: Last documented Great King of the Land of Hatti.)
Kuzi-Tesub (Note: King and then Great King of Carchemish (Bryce 1997, pp. 384–385).)

- (1) = 1st spouse
- (2) = 2nd spouse
- Small caps indicates a Great King (LUGAL.GAL) of the Land of Hatti; italic small caps indicates a Great Queen or Tawananna.
- Dashed lines indicate adoption.
- Solid lines indicate marriage (if horizontal) or parentage (if vertical).

References:
- Trevor Bryce (1997). The Kingdom of the Hittites. Oxford, England: Clarendon Press.
- Trevor Bryce (2005). The Kingdom of the Hittites (new edition). Oxford, England: Clarendon Press.
- Trevor Bryce (2012). The World of the Neo-Hittite Kingdoms. Oxford, England: Oxford University Press.
- Jacques Freu (2007). Les débuts du nouvel empire hittite. Paris, France: L'Harmattan.
- Volkert Haas (2006). Die hethitische Literatur. Berlin, Germany: de Gruyter.
Notes:

Hittite New Kingdom royal family tree according to Jacques Freu
- Kantuzzili, (Note: Freu & Mazoyer 2007b: 24, 34, 45.) m. Walanni, perhaps daughter of Zidanta II (Note: Freu & Mazoyer 2007b: 24.)
  - TUDḪALIYA I (c.1465–1440 BC), (Note: Freu & Mazoyer 2007b: 24, 34, 45.) m. Kattešḫapi (?) (Note: Freu & Mazoyer 2007b: 63-68.)
    - ḪATTUŠILI II (c.1440–1425 BC), (Note: Freu & Mazoyer 2007b: 68.) m. Ašmu-Ḫeba (?) (Note: Freu & Mazoyer 2007b: 97.)
      - TUDḪALIYA II (c.1425–1390 BC), (Note: Freu & Mazoyer 2007b: 76.) m. Nikkal-mati (Note: Freu & Mazoyer 2007b: 96.)
        - Ašmu-Nikkal, (Note: Freu & Mazoyer 2007b: 96-99.) m. ARNUWANDA I (c.1390–1370 BC) (Note: Freu & Mazoyer 2007b: 96-99.)
          - TUDḪALIYA III/Tašmi-Šarri (c.1370–1350 BC), (Note: Freu & Mazoyer 2007b: 155.) m. (1) Šatandu-Ḫeba; (=?) (2) Tadu-Ḫeba (Note: Freu & Mazoyer 2007b: 161-162, considering the two names variants, referring to the same queen.)
            - Tulpi-Teššub the Younger (Note: Freu & Mazoyer 2007b: 155-156, additionally suggesting to identify him with Tudḫaliya the Younger.)
            - Tudḫaliya the Younger d.c.1350 BC (Note: Freu & Mazoyer 2007b: 199-200.)
            - Ḫenti, (Note: Freu & Mazoyer 2007b: 199-201.) m. ŠUPPILULIUMA I (c.1350–1319 BC), (Note: Freu & Mazoyer 2007b: 198-201.) who m. (2) Tawananna (Malnigal) of Babylon (Note: Freu & Mazoyer 2007b: 257.)
              - ARNUWANDA II (c.1319–1318 BC) (Note: Freu & Mazoyer 2007b: 211.)
              - Telipinu, Priest of Kizzuwatna, then vassal king of Aleppo, left descendants (Note: Freu & Mazoyer 2007b: 211, 273, 276.)
              - Piyaššili/Šarri-Kušuḫ, vassal king of Carchemish, left descendants (Note: Freu & Mazoyer 2007b: 275.)
              - Zannanza, (Note: Freu & Mazoyer 2007b: 278, 284.) betrothed to Ankhesenamun (?) (Note: Freu & Mazoyer 2007b: 284.)
              - MURŠILI II (c.1318–1295 BC), (Note: Freu & Mazoyer 2008: 19.) m. (1) Gaššulawiya; (Note: Freu & Mazoyer 2008: 62-65.) (2) Danu-Ḫeba (Note: Freu & Mazoyer 2008: 65-67.)
                - Ḫalpašulupi (Note: Freu & Mazoyer 2008: 87.)
                - MUWATALLI II (c.1295–1272 BC) (Note: Freu & Mazoyer 2008: 87.)
                  - MURŠILI III/Urḫi-Teššub (c.1272–1265 BC) (Note: Freu & Mazoyer 2008: 128-129, 153.)
                  - Kurunta/Ulmi-Teššub, vassal king of Tarḫuntašša, left descendants (Note: Freu & Mazoyer 2008: 165-169.)
                - Maššanauzzi, (Note: Freu & Mazoyer 2008: 87.) m. King Mašturi of the Šeḫa River Land (Note: Freu & Mazoyer 2008: 130, 222.)
                - ḪATTUŠILI III (c.1265–1240 BC), (Note: Freu & Mazoyer 2008: 87, 163.) m. Pudu-Ḫeba (Note: Freu & Mazoyer 2008: 149-150.)
                  - Nerikkaili, (Note: Freu & Mazoyer 2008: 164, 201.) m. daughter of King Bentešina of Amurru (Note: Freu & Mazoyer 2010: 65.)
                  - Ḫuzziya (Note: Freu & Mazoyer 2008: 165, 201-203.)
                  - TUDḪALIYA IV/Tašmi-Šarruma (c.1240–1215 BC) (Note: Freu & Mazoyer 2008: 166, 201; Freu & Mazoyer 2010: 20-21, rejecting the alternative reading "Ḫišmi-Šarruma.")
                    - ARNUWANDA III (c.1215–1210 BC) (Note: Freu & Mazoyer 2010: 177-178.)
                    - ŠUPPILULIUMA II (c.1210–1185 BC) (Note: Freu & Mazoyer 2010: 178-180.)
                      - TUDḪALIYA V (?) (Note: Freu 2010–2011: 190-191.)
                      - Eḫli-Nikkal, m. King Ammurapi of Ugarit (Note: Freu 2010: 189.)
                  - Ḫannuti (Note: Freu & Mazoyer 2008: 166, 201-202.)
                  - Ḫešni (Note: Freu & Mazoyer 2008: 166, 201, 203-204.)
                  - Kurakura (Note: Freu & Mazoyer 2010: 66.)
                  - Ḫišmi-Šarruma (Note: Freu & Mazoyer 2010: 67-68.)
                  - Maathorneferure, (Note: Freu & Mazoyer 2008: 166, 239.) m. King Ramesses II of Egypt (Note: Freu & Mazoyer 2008: 166, 239.)
                  - Unknown, m. King Ramesses II of Egypt (Note: Freu & Mazoyer 2008: 166, 240-241.)
                  - Gaššulawiya, (Note: Freu & Mazoyer 2008: 166, 210.) m. King Bentešina of Amurru (Note: Freu & Mazoyer 2008: 166, 210.)
                  - Kiluš-Ḫeba, (Note: Freu & Mazoyer 2008: 166.) m. King Ari-Šarruma of Išuwa (Note: Freu & Mazoyer 2008: 166; Freu & Mazoyer 2010: 67.)
              - Muwatti, m. King Mašḫuiluwa of Mira-Kuwaliya (Note: Freu & Mazoyer 2008: 69.)
              - Unknown, m. King Šattiwaza of Mittani (Note: Freu & Mazoyer 2007b: 289.)
          - Kantuzzili, Priest of Kizzuwatna (Note: Freu & Mazoyer 2007b: 148-149.)
          - Pariyawatra (Note: Freu & Mazoyer 2007b: 148.)
          - Mannini (Note: Freu & Mazoyer 2007b: 148.)
          - Tulpi-Teššub (Note: Freu & Mazoyer 2007b: 148.)
          - Ašmi-Šarruma
      - Ziplantawiya, Queen, (Note: Freu & Mazoyer 2007b: 96-98.) m. Unknown
        - Attāi (Note: Freu & Mazoyer 2007b: 97.)

A detailed and annotated genealogy of Hittite New Kingdom monarchs and their families, as reconstructed by Jacques Freu in his multi-volume work Les Hittites et leur histoire, presented as an alternative to the less detailed and sometimes differing reconstruction based on Trevor Bryce, The Kingdom of the Hittites.

References:
- Freu, Jacques, and Michel Mazoyer (2007b), Les débuts du nouvel empire hittite, Paris.
- Freu, Jacques, and Michel Mazoyer (2008), L'apogée du nouvel empire hittite, Paris.
- Freu, Jacques, and Michel Mazoyer (2010), Le déclin et la chute du nouvel empire hittite, Paris.
- Freu, Jacques (2010–2011), "Le vase d'argent du musée des civilisations anatoliennes d'Ankara et la fin de l'empire hittite," Talanta 42–43 (2010–2011) 185-192.

== In fiction ==
Šuppiluliuma I appears in Mika Waltari's historical novel The Egyptian, in which he is presented as the ultimate villain, a ruthless conqueror and utterly tyrannical ruler. Popular culture researcher Abe Brown notes that "As Waltari's book was written during the Second World War, Šuppiluliuma's depiction is likely to be at least in part inspired by Hitler, rather than by historical facts. Unlike quite a few other historical figures of many times and places who got cast in the role of Hitler, Šuppiluliuma has not yet attracted the attention of any historical novelist to write a bit more nuanced popular account—though his life certainly offers rich untapped material".

Janet Morris wrote a detailed biographical novel, I, the Sun, whose subject was Šuppiluliuma I, in which all characters are from the historical record, about which O.M. Gurney, Hittite scholar and author of The Hittites, commented that "the author is familiar with every aspect of Hittite culture".

Šuppiluliuma appears in a minor role in the novel The Shadow Prince by Philip Armstrong, as the grandfather of the hero, Tupiluliuma, in which he is Tudḫaliya's nephew and adopted son. It is explained that he was reluctantly forced to take the throne and exclude his adoptive brother, Tudḫaliya the Younger, as a result of his predecessor's descent into madness. He is regarded as one of the greatest of the Great Kings of Hatti, but is not a man to be crossed lightly.

Šuppiluliuma is a character in the historical fiction manga Red River, introduced as an old man who has retired from warfare. He dies shortly after the start of the story.

Šuppiluliuma may be depicted in the 'Nantucket' novels of S.M. Stirling, but under an alternative name, with a son called Kalkash.

Šuppiluliuma is a character in Turkish author Hüseyin Nihal Atsız's satirical novel Dalkavuklar Gecesi (The Night of the Sycophants), set in the Hittite kingdom.

== See also ==
- Piyaššili, son of Šuppiluliuma I
- Šuppiluliuma II, the last certain Hittite great king, descendant of Šuppiluliuma I
- Zita (Hittite prince), brother of Šuppiluliuma I

== Bibliography ==
- Astour, Michael C. (1989), Hittite History and the Absolute Chronology of the Bronze Age, Partille.
- Beckman, Gary (1996), Hittite Diplomatic Texts, Atlanta.
- Beckman, Gary (1997), "Plague Prayers of Muršili II (I.60)," in William H. Hallo and K. Lawson Younger Jr., eds., The Context of Scripture, vol. 1, Leiden.
- Beckman, Gary (2000), "Hittite Chronology," Akkadica 119-120 (2000) 19–32.
- Bilgin, Tayfun (2018), Official and Administration in the Hittite World, Berlin.
- Bryce, Trevor (2005), The Kingdom of the Hittites, Oxford.
- Freu, Jacques, and Michel Mazoyer (2007b), Les débuts du nouvel empire hittite, Paris.
- Freu, Jacques, and Michel Mazoyer (2008), L'apogée du nouvel empire hittite, Paris.
- Gautschy, Rita, Reassessment of Absolute Chronology of the Egyptian New Kingdom and its ´Brotherly´ Countries, Ägypten und Levante 24, 2014, pp. 141-158 PDF
- Hout, Theo P. J. van den (1993), "De zaak Zannanza: een Egyptisch-Hettitisch Brievendossier," Phoenix 39 (1993): 159-167.
- Hout, Theo P. J. van den (1994), "Der Falke und das Kücken: der neue Pharao und der hethitische Prinz," Zeitschrift für Assyriologie 84 (1994) 60-88.
- Güterbock, Hans G. (1956), "The Deeds of Suppiluliuma as Told by His Son, Mursili II," Journal of Cuneiform Studies 10 (1956) 107-130.
- Güterbock, Hans G. (1973), "Ḫattušili II Once More," Journal of Cuneiform Studies 25 (1973) 100-104.
- Klengel, Horst (1999), Geschichte des Hethitischen Reiches, Leiden.
- Kuhrt, Amélie (1995), The Ancient Near East c. 3000–330 BC, vol. 1., London.
- Stavi, Boaz (2011), "The Genealogy of Suppiluliuma I," Altorientalische Forschungen 38 (2011) 226–239. online
- Taracha, Piotr (2016), "Tudhaliya III's Queens, Šuppiluliuma's Accession and Related Issues," in Sedat Erkut and Özlem Sir Gavaz (eds.), Studies in Honour of Ahmet Ünal Armağanı, Istanbul: 489–498. online
- Weeden, Mark (2022), "The Hittite Empire," in Karen Radner et al. (eds.), The Oxford History of the Ancient Near East, vol. 3 (From the Hyksos to the Late Second Millennium BC), Oxford: 529-622.
- Wilhelm, Gernot (2004), "Generation Count in Hittite Chronology," in Herman Hunger and Regine Pruzsinszky, eds., Mesopotamian Dark Age Revisited, Vienna, 71-79.

Regnal titles
Preceded by Tudḫaliya III	Hittite king c. 1350–c. 1322 BC	Succeeded by Arnuwanda II
