= Amqu =

Region

The Amqu (also Amka, Amki, Amq) is a region during the Late Bronze Age, equivalent to the Beqaa Valley region in eastern Lebanon, named in the 1350–1335 BC Amarna letters corpus.

== Late Bronze ==
=== Amarna Archive ===
In the Amarna letters (c. 1350 BC), two other associated regions appear to be east(?) and north(?), and are often mentioned in association with Amqu, namely Nuhašše, and Niya-Niye (or Nii). A third hypothetical region, either adjacent or within the region of Amqu, is Subaru, as according to the letter corpus possessions or people were sold: "at the land of Subaru".

Initially, the northern Levant (Syria) was under the control of the Mitanni Empire. In 1350 BC, Suppiluliuma I of Hatti attacked Tushratta of Mitanni, starting a massive war in Syria, beginning with the Sack of Washukanni and ending with the Fall of Carchemish some years later. Thus, Suppiluliuma I and his generals moved on former Mitanni vassals west of the Euphrates river, causing turmoil in the region and coming in conflict with the Egyptian Empire in the southern Levant. Some lords changed their allegiance to the Hittites like Etakkama of Qidšu/Qinsa-(also Kissa)-(i.e. Kadesh).

==== Abdi-Riša letter-(his only letter) ====
(The scribe wrote four identical letters-(for four city-state leaders), so who the 'author' is has to be speculative.)

===== Amarna Letter EA 363 - "A joint report on Amqu (4)" =====
Say to the king-(i.e. Pharaoh), my lord, my god, my Sun: Message of 'Abdi-Riša, your servant, the ruler of E(ni)šasi. I fall in the dirt under the feet of the king, my lord, 7 times and 7 times.

Look, we ar(e) in Amqu, in cities of the king, my lord, and Etakkama, the ruler of Qinsa-(Kadesh), assisted the troops of Hatti and set the cities of the king, my lord, on fire. May the king, my lord, take cognizance, and may the king, my lord, give archers that we may (re)gain the cities of the king, my lord, and dwell in the cities of the king, my lord, my god, my Sun.

-EA 363, lines 1-23 (complete)

== See also ==
- Abdi-Riša
- Amarna letters
- Aammiq Wetland
