= Tutu (Egyptian official) =

Tutu was one of pharaoh's officials during the Amarna letters period 1350–1335 BC. He is only found in the body of letters from Aziru, and his son, DU-Teššup. Four of the Amarna letters—EA 158, 164, 167 and 169—are addressed to the Pharaoh, by way of Tutu. DU-Teššup's single letter is written to pharaoh because his father Aziru is being detained in Egypt, and Aziru is needed to attend to affairs at home. Unless he were to remarry he may never return home again.

== Letter EA 164 ==
The undamaged letter EA 164 "Coming, on condition" by Aziru to Tutu is a good example of the intrigues of Aziru in north Canaan, and the involvement of all the local regions, and leaders.

To Tutu, my lord, my father: Message of Aziru, your servant. I fall at the feet of my lord.

Hatip has come and brought the gracious and sweet words of the king, my lord, and I am quite overjoyed. My land (i.e. Amurru), and my brothers, the servants of the king, my lord, and the servants of Tutu, my lord, are overjoyed when the breath of the king, my lord, comes. I do not deviate from the orders of my lord, my god, my Sun, and from the orders of Tutu, my lord. My lord, since Hatip is staying with me, he and I will make the journey. My lord, the king of Hatti has come to Nuhašše and I cannot g[o]. Just let the king of Hatti depart and straightaway I will make the journey with Hatip. May the king, my lord, heed my words. My lord, I am afraid of the king, my lord, and of Tutu. Here are my gods and my messenger. Tutu and the magnates of the king, my lord, I would put under oath and then I will make the journey. And thus Tutu, the king, my lord, and the magnates: "(We swear) we will not devise anything regarding Aziru that is not good." Thus are you to be put under oath to my gods and to Aman.

Tutu, know [t]hat I will come to you.

— EA 164, lines 1-44 (complete)

== Other letters ==
- EA 158, "Father and son"
- EA 164, "Coming, on condition"
- EA 167, "The constant Hittite menace"
- EA 169, "Aziru in Egypt-(Mizri)" (see DU-Teššup)

== See also ==
- DU-Teššup
