= 1360s BC =

Decade

The 1360s BC is a decade that lasted from 1369 BC to 1360 BC.

== Events and trends ==
- First credible mention of "Urusalim" (Jerusalem) in the Amarna letters.
- Rule of Canaanite warlord Labaya.

== Significant people ==
- 1368 BC—Death of Erichthonius, mythical King of Dardania.
- 1366 BC—Birth of Princess Tadukhipa to Tusratta, King of Mitanni and his Queen Juni. She will be later married to Amenhotep III and after his death to his son and heir Amenhotep IV Akhenaton. She is variously identified with Akhenaton's Queens Nefertiti and Kiya.
- 1365 BC—Ashur-uballit I rises to the throne on Assyria.
- 1365 BC—Birth of Tushratta to Shuttarna, king of Mitanni.
- c. 1365 BC—The Citadel of Tiryns, Greece, is built.
- 1362 BC—Birth of the later Pharaoh Amenhotep IV Akhenaton to Amenhotep III and his Queen Tiy.
- 1360 BC—End of the reign of Kadashman-Enlil I of the Kassite Dynasty of Babylonia.
