= Etakkama =

Ruler of Kadesh, c. 1355 to 1312 BC

Etakkama/Aitukama
- "Man of Qinza/Qidsu"
- Reign: c. 1349–1312 BC
- Predecessor: Shutatarra
- Successor: Niqmaddu
- Issue: Niqmaddu
- Father: Shutatarra

Etakkama, as a common name, but also, Aitukama, Atak(k)ama, Etak(k)ama, and Itak(k)ama is the name for the 'mayor' (king) of Qidšu, (Kadesh) of the 1350–1335 BC Amarna letters correspondence. (Qidšu is also referenced as: Qinšu, also Kissa). Etakkama is referenced in 11 of the 382 EA letters, (EA for 'el Amarna'), and especially, a series of 4 identical letters concerning: Amqu, the region of the Beqaa in Lebanon. Those 4 letters concern the intrigues of city/city-state takeovers, along with troops from Hatti, and the claim of: Etakkama's troops from 'Kinsa' -(Qidšu-Kissa)-Kadesh) and are titled: "A joint report on Amqu (1-4)".

== Family ==
Etakkama was the son of Shutatarra (died c. 1350 BC).

== Reign ==
His title was not necessary "king" (LUGAL "great man"), but "Man of Kadesh" (LU "man"). In earlier times, Kadesh had been part of the Kingdom of Qatna. Prior to 1350 BC, this region had been under the influence of Tushratta of Mitanni. However, in 1350 BC, Suppiluliuma I of Hatti attacked Mitanni and waged war on the vassals on the western side of the Euphrates. Initially, Etakkama and his father had gone out to fight Suppiluliuma I, but were defeated and taken to Hatti. Etakkama then returned as a vassal of Suppiluliuma I ruling Kadesh and launching attacks on other former Mitanni vassals who did not subjugate themselves to the Hittites. In addition, a diplomatic game was played with Tutankhamen of Egypt to keep the Egyptians confused and out of the war.

Besides claiming his loyalty to Pharaoh, Etakkama is revealing how Biryawaza, the King of Dimašqu, (Damascus) is really the problem in Upu, the region surrounding Damascus. The 'Amqu region' is the Beqaa Valley area to the northeast (of Damascus), in Lebanon.

He was initially considered a loyal ally of Egypt, before he joined the Hittites in an alliance under Aziru . Later, Aitakama openly opposed Šuppiluliuma I, who then took him prisoner to Hatti . After Aitakama had to confess to supporting Hatti, he was reinstated as king in Kadesh by Šuppiluliuma I. In the Amarna letters, Akhenaten describes him as a traitor, partisan and enemy of Egypt, with whom one would not sit at the same table .

=== Vassal of Suppiluliuma I ===
Around 1350 BC, Etakkama switched his allegiance to Suppiluliuma I of Hatti as the Mitanni Empire fell and the Egyptian Empire was unable to provide assistance.

=== Revolt against Mursili II ===
In 1312 BC, the aged Etakkama led a revolt against Hatti in the 10th year of the reign of Mursili II, but was murdered during a Hittite siege of Kadesh by his son Niqmaddu, who then assumed the kingship. The revolt had been aided by Horemheb of Egypt, called Arma'a, Man of Egypt (not recognized as king by the Hittites), by Mursili II.

== Amarna Archive ==
The Amarna Archive has 20 references in 11 letters with variations of the name of Etakkama. Letters are from Byblos (EA 140), Enu-Sasi (EA 363), Hasabu (EA 174), Hazi (EA 175), Musihuna (EA 197), Qadesh (EA 189), Qatna (EA 053, 054, 056), Tyre (EA 151) and Unknown Location (EA 176).

Aitakama or in other spellings: Aitaqama, Itakama, Itaqama, Etakkama, Etakama, Aitagama ( Hittite A-i-tag-ga-ma ).

=== Letters by Etakkama to the Pharaoh ===
==== Amarna Letter EA 189 ====
Etakkama was the author of one letter, EA 189, title: "Etakkama of Qadesh"

To the king, my lord: Message of Etakkama, your servant. I fall at the feet of my lord, my Sun, 7 times plus 7. My lord, I am your servant, but the wicked Biryawaza has gone on defaming me in your sight, my lord, and when he was defaming me in your sight, then he took my entire paternal estate along with the land of Qidšu, and sent my cities up in flames. But, I assure you, the commissioners of the king, my lord, and his magnates know my loyalty, since I said to the magnate Puhuru, "May the magnate Puhuru know that [...]" ...

==== Reverse ====
...Biryawaza. Thus do I serve you along w[it]h all my brothers, and wherever there is war against the king, I go, together with my troops, together with my chariots, and together with all my brothers. Since Biryawaza had allowed all of the cities of the king, my lord, to go over to the 'Apiru in Tahši and Upu, I went, and with your gods and your Sun leading me, I restored from the 'Apiru the cities to the king, my lord, for his service, and I disbanded the 'Apiru. May the king, my lord, rejoice at Etakkama, his servant, for I serve the king, my lord, together with all my brothers. I serve the king, my lord, but Biryawaza caused the loss of all [your] lan[ds. His intention] is solely injustice, but I am [your servant] forever.

— EA 189, lines 1–20, Rev: lines 1–27 (bottom of tablet-letter damaged, lacuna of 2–5 sentences(?))

== See also ==
- Biryawaza, mayor of Dimašqu/Damascus
- Aram Damascus
- Amqu; letter about Etakkama: "A joint report on Amqu (4)"
- Upu
