= Kadesh (Syria) =

Archaeological site

Tell Nebi Mend
- Qadesh
- Location within Syria
- 34°33′27″N 36°31′12″E
- Location: Syria
- Region: Homs Governorate

Site notes
- Excavation dates: 1922-1923, 1975-1995
- Archaeologists: Maurice Pezard, Peter Parr

Kadesh, or Qadesh, was an ancient city of the Levant on or near the headwaters or a ford of the Orontes River. It was of some importance during the Late Bronze Age and is mentioned in the Amarna letters. It was the site of the Battle of Kadesh between the Hittite and Egyptian empires in the 13th century BC.

== Name and location ==
The name is from the West Semitic (Canaanite) root Q-D-Š "holy". It is rendered Qdšw or Qdš in Egyptian hieroglyphic and Kinza in Hittite. The place name appears in several slightly different Akkadian spellings in the Amarna letters, including Qidšu (EA 162, 188, 189, 190), Qidši (EA 53, 151), Qinsa (EA 54, 174, 175, 176, 363), and Qissa (EA 197); these are sometimes spelled less accurately as Kidša, Kinza, and Gizza. On this basis, Trevor Bryce observes that the Late Bronze Age name "was probably pronounced Qidš(a), with 'Qadesh' being a mispronunciation by mod[ern] scholars." The Iron Age form of the name in Neo-Assyrian Akkadian is Qadīsu.

Kadesh is identified with the ruins at Tell Nebi Mend (Tall an-Nabī Mandū), about 24 kilometers (15 mi) southwest of Homs near al-Qusayr and adjacent to the modern-day Syrian village of Tell al-Nabi Mando. The text of the Kadesh inscriptions locates Kadesh as being near Tunip in the land of the Amurru, itself assumed to have been near the Orontes River (perhaps at Tell Salhab).

Some scholars also identify Kadesh with the city of Kadytis (Καδύτις in Greek) mentioned by Herodotus (2.159, an alternative identification for Kadytis being Gaza.

== History ==
=== Early Bronze Age ===
Following an occupation of the site during the Pottery Neolithic (seventh millennium BC), there was a period of abandonment, before the site was reoccupied in the third millennium BC. In the late Early Bronze Age, the site is known for White-on-Blackweel Ware pottery. This ware appeared in the transitional EB III/IV (Phase O), flourished and was traded in the Orontes Valley up to the Plains of Antioch and to eastern North Syria in EB IVA (Phase N). In EB IVB (Phase M), the ware continued features from the previous phase, but is easily distinguishable. It disappeared in the transitional EB IV/MB I (Phase L). Comparison should be made with Hama J7-5 (EB IVA) and J4-2 (EB IVB).

=== Middle Bronze Age ===
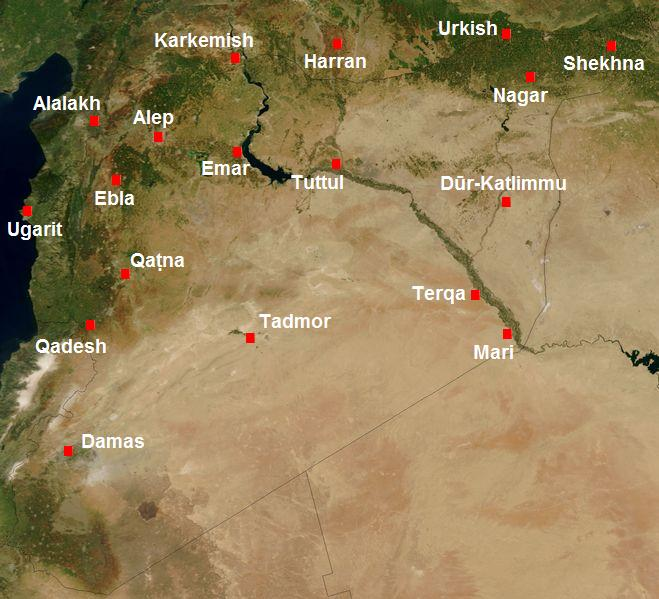
Map of Syria in the second millennium BC, showing the location of Kadesh (Qadesh)

The city first entered historical records when it was mentioned in the archive of Mari in the 18th century BC as the headquarters of king Ishi-Addu of Qatna during the suppression of a rebellion in the south of the city.

In Inner Syria, the Middle Bronze ends with the military campaigns of Muršili I of Hatti (c. 1595 BC, according to the commonly cited Mesopotamian Middle Chronology). Here the MB IIB is followed by LB IA, while MB IIC starts in the southern Levant. About this time, there is a further possible destruction and abandonment of Kadesh, quickly followed by rebuilding.

=== Late Bronze Age ===
==== Period of Mittanian overlordship ====
Kadesh came under the influence of Mittani influence after the murder of Muršili I of Hatti (c. 1587 BC) and the subsequent decline of the Old Hittite Kingdom. The Mitanni confederation emerged from the Habur region, and the small kingdoms of northern Syria became its allies or vassals.

Around 1490 BC (according to the commonly cited Egyptian Low Chronology), the Egyptian king Thutmose I campaigned north into Syria against Mittani, along with Aram, an ally of Kadesh. In the time of Hatshepsut there were no campaigns against Kadesh as she was focused on developing trade across the Red Sea and southward.

==== Period of Egyptian overlordship ====
Battle of Megiddo. Kadesh is noted as one of two Canaanite cities (with Megiddo) that led a coalition of city-states opposing the conquest of the Levant by the Egyptian king Thutmose III. The king of Kadesh was probably encouraged in this resistance by the ruler of Mittani, Egypt's primary foreign rival the Levant. Egyptian victory in the subsequent Battle of Megiddo (1457 BC) led to the establishment of Egyptian hegemony over Kadesh, along with other parts of southern and western Syria.

Amarna Letters. Following further Egyptian military activity under Amenhotep II, Thutmose IV established peace between Egypt and Mittani, and Kadesh continued as Egyptian vassal. The troubled relations among Egyptian vassals in Syria are reflected in the diplomatic correspondence between them and the Egyptian king Akhenaten preserved at his capital Amarna. Kadesh is mentioned several times, under the name Qidšu (and variants) in these Akkadian language letters. At least one of the letters (EA 189) was sent to Akhenaten by Aitakkama, the king of Kadesh himself.

==== Period of Hittite overlordship ====
Around 1350 BC, Šuppiluliuma I of Hatti attacked Tušratta of Mittani, conducting military campaigns against Mittanian strongholds, and then taking control over vassal rulers west of the Euphrates River in Syria. This expansion eventually impacted Egyptian interests and eventually both Aziru of Amurru and Aitakkama of Kadesh became Hittite vassals. Kadesh's northern neighbor, Qatna, which had been the regional capital in the Middle Bronze, now came to an end facing the Hittites. When Aitakkama of Kadesh sought Egyptian support to assert his independence from the Hittites, he was murdered by his son Niqmaddu, who took over Kadesh and duly reaffirmed its loyalty to the Hittite king Muršili II.

The names of three kings of Kadesh survive from contemporary sources: Šuttarna (or Šutatarra; fl. c. 1350 BC); Aitakkama (c. 1340s–1312 BC) and his son Niqmaddu (fl. c. 1312 BC).

==== Campaign of Seti I ====
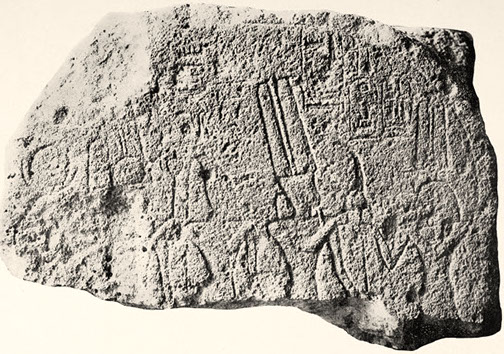
Seti I stele fragment from Tell Nebi Mend (Kadesh)

The city was captured by the great pharaoh Seti I (1290–1279 BC), during his campaign to Syria. Kadesh had been lost to Egypt since the time of Akhenaten, and Seti's predecessors Tutankhamun and Horemheb had both failed to recapture the city from the Hittites. Seti I was successful here and defeated a Hittite army that tried to defend it. He triumphantly entered the city together with his son Ramesses II and erected a victory stela at the site.

Seti's success, however, was only temporary. As soon as Seti returned to Egypt, the Hittite king, probably Muwattalli II, marched south to take Kadesh and made it a stronghold of the Hittite defenses in Syria. The Hittites dominated northern Syria through their viceroy at Carchemish.

==== Battle of Kadesh ====
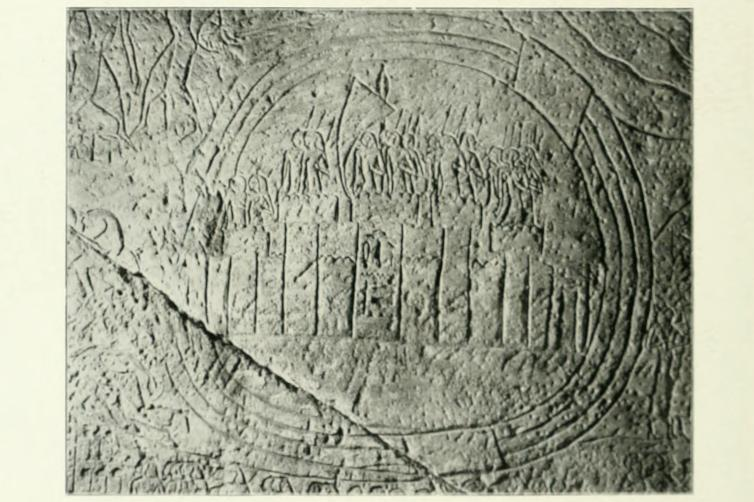
Egyptian relief dating to Ramesses II's reign, depicting Kadesh garrisoned by Hittites and surrounded by the Orontes River.

The city is best known for one of the earliest extensively documented battles of the ancient world, the Battle of Kadesh between the superpowers of the 13th century BC, the Egyptian and Hittite Empires. An Egyptian vassal for some 150 years, Kadesh had eventually defected to Hittite suzerainty, thereby placing the city on the contested frontier between the two rival empires.

In response to this Hittite expansion southwards, the Egyptian pharaoh Ramesses II (1279–1213 BC) prepared an aggressive military response and captured the coastal state of Amurru in his Year 4. The next year, the Hittites moved south to recover Amurru, while the Egyptians moved north to continue their expansion into Syria. The inhabitants of Kadesh had cut a channel from the river to a stream south of the town, which had turned the town into a virtual island.

In May 1274 BC, Year 5 of Ramesses' reign, he led a large force of chariots and infantry 1,000 miles (1,600 km) to retake the walled city. In the Battle of Kadesh, the two forces clashed on the plain west of the city and the Orontes River, in what is widely regarded as the largest chariot versus chariot battle in history (5,000–6,000 between the two sides). The battle saw the Egyptians turning a near catastrophe into a near victory. After Hittite spies convinced the Egyptians that the Hittites were far away, the Hittites ambushed Ramesses in his camp. Ramesses rallied his bodyguard and broke out of the trap in time for the last-minute arrival of a supporting Egyptian force from coastal Amurru. The pharaoh was able to recover the initiative, to repulse the attack, and to remain in control of the battlefield. Although the Hittite trap and attack had failed, Ramesses was unable to continue the campaign and had to return home to Egypt.

==== Aftermath ====
Following the battle, Kadesh remained under Hittite overlordship, Amurru returned to the Hittite fold, while the Hittite army was able to raid southward as far as Upi, in the neighborhood of Damascus. By Year 8 of Ramesses II's reign (1272 BC), the Egyptians were back on the offensive, reaching northwards beyond Kadesh to Dapur and Tunip, but do not appear to have made any lasting gains.

The subsequent impasse between Egypt and Hatti was resolved in one of the earliest known international peace treaties, concluded 15 years later between Ramesses II and the Hittite king Ḫattušili III. The treaty essentially accepted the status quo, with Amurru and Kadesh continuing as Hittite vassals.

=== End of Kadesh ===
Kadesh was probably destroyed by the invading Sea Peoples around 1178 BC. It was, however, reoccupied, and is attested in Neo-Assyrian administrative texts under the name Qadīsu. Hellenistic remains have been found in the upper levels of the tell mound, the summit of which is still occupied today. In Byzantine times, widespread occupation is evidenced by extensive remains at the foot of the tell. The Hellenistic city of Laodicea ad Libanum is believed to have occupied the same site as ancient Kadesh. Continuous occupation throughout the Islamic period is likely, the mound having been named after a local Muslim holy man, Nebi Mend.

== Tell Nebi Mend ==
Tell Nebi Mend, consisting of an upper (450 x 200 meter) and lower tell, lies 10 kilometers southwest of the modern city of Homs and covers an area of about 10 hectares and rises to a height of about 30 meters over the plain. An enclosure wall around the site, thought to be Middle Bronze Age, encompasses about 40 hectares. Located at the confluence of the Orontes River and Mukadiya river, it was occupied through the Neolithic (followed by a break in occupation), Bronze Age, Iron Age, and Hellenistic/Roman periods.

The site was first excavated by a French team led by Maurice Pezard in 1922 and 1923, in the northeast quadrant of the upper mound. The excavator opened two trenches, one 60 meters by 25 meters, and 20 meters deep and the other 30 by 40 meters by 70 meters and shallow. Finds included an incomplete stele of Pharaoh Seti I (c. 1294/1290–1279 BC) in a out-of-context Iron Age level, some stone statuettes and Syro-Hittite cylinder seals, and a terracotta figurine.

The site was then excavated between 1975 and 1995 by a team from the University College London Institute of Archaeology led by Peter Parr. Nine trenches were opened, all on the upper mound, with excavated levels ranging from Middle Bronze I to Late Bronze II. A number of charcoal samples were radiocarbon dated though there were apparently technical problems that limited their usefulness. Six cuneiform tablets were found at the site, one blank with sealing and the others in a Babylonian dialect of Akkadian. The tablets, from the late 14th century BC, mentioned the name of a ruler, Niqmadda, and provided confirmation of the site as Qadesh.

The site has received damage in the Syrian Civil War.

== See also ==
- Cities of the ancient Near East
