= Hattusili's Civil War =

Hittite civil war (1267 BC)

Hittite Civil War
- Hatti before the Civil War
Date	c. 1267 BC (short chronology)
Location	New Kingdom Hatti
Result	Ḫattušili victory
Territorial changes	Muršili granted a fiefdom in Nuhašše before eventually fleeing to exile in Egypt

Belligerents
Hattušaš utne under Muršili III: Ḫattuša and the South; Sippaziti's Upper Land recruits	Hattušaš utne under Ḫattušili III: Upper Land lead from Ḫakpiš; Kaška troops loyal to Hattušili

Hattusili's Civil War was a struggle between the Hittite king Muršili III and his uncle Ḫattušili III that occurred around 1267 BC. This struggle erupted into a civil war, which Ḫattušili went on to win. Muršili was exiled, but continued to claim the throne from abroad.

== Background ==
In the years before the civil war, the Hittite Empire had gained enormous power and prosperity under the kingship of Muwatalli II (1295–1272 BC). In particular, Muwatalli is notable for inconclusively opposing the Egyptian pharaoh Ramesses II at the Battle of Kadesh in 1274 BC. Possibly for strategic reasons, Muwatalli relocated the Hittite capital from its traditional seat in the northern city of Ḫattuša to the southern city of Tarḫuntašša. In doing so, he left the northern region in the hands of his younger brother Ḫattušili, later known as Ḫattušili III.

Ḫattušili thrived in his role as ruler of the north. A skilled administrator and politician, he successfully displaced rivals including another member of the royal family named Arma-Tarhunda. He was also a successful military commander, both in his personal campaigns in the north as well as when supporting his brother's campaigns in Syria. As a result, he was granted significant autonomy to rule the north as a LUGAL ("king"), while Muwatalli served as LUGAL.GAL ("great king") in the south. This situation remained stable as throughout Muwatalli's reign.

After Muwatalli II died in 1272 BC, the throne passed to his son Muršili III, who is also often known by his Hurrian name Urḫi-Teššub. Muršili's ascent to the throne appears to have been smooth, and was initially supported by his uncle Ḫattušili, who continued to rule in the north. However, Muršili soon decided to move the capital city back north to Ḫattuša. In doing so, he stripped Ḫattušili of his status and requisitioned his fiefdoms at Ḫakpiš and Nerik. Scholars believe that these actions were the catalyst for Ḫattušili's subsequent rebellion.

Arma-Tarhunda was Mursili II's cousin and appointed as governor of the Upper Land. Muwatalli replaced him in this position with Hattusili, which disgruntled Arma-Tarhunda. In addition, Muwatalli appointed Hattusili Gal Mesedi the highest military rank after the King himself. Bryce believes Hattusili must have merited these posts by experiences not recorded or now lost to us, not just anyone were appointed Gal Mesedi and given command of the Hittite Army. While Arma-Tarhunda retaliating with an 'hate campaign' conducted at court, targeting Hattusili after Arma-Tarhundas deposition as Governor.

Eventually half of Arma-Tarhunda's estate were restored, but his family being sent into exile to Alashiya. With exception being made for Sippaziti, Arma-Tarhunda's son. Mursili III would go on to reign for five years as Great King.

Another reason for the Civil War was the Hittite vassal Benteshina, King of Amurru. He had defected to Seti I before the war with Egypt, been deposed post-war by Muwatalli. Spent his exile in Hakpis with Hattusili and was restored to the throne of Amurru by Mursili III. With Bryce thinking Mursili's and Hattusili's relationship gradually deteriorated.

== War ==
The Civil War erupted sometime around 1267 BC (short chronology). It was brief and bitter. During this war, Muršili's own brother, Kurunta supported Ḫattušili's war effort. It ended with Muršili captured.

Sippaziti had been recalled by Muršili, to gather troops in the Upper Land for Muršili, probably in exchange for restoration of the governorship of the Upper Land to his family. Sippaziti however weren't very successful. Bryce reconstructs the war; On the eve of the war, Mursili had entrenched himself in Hattusa and Hattusili in Hakpis. Hattusili rallying many of his former officers to his banner, who had been dismissed by Mursili from service before the war. Mursili, an inexperienced military commander took to the march towards Hakpis. Possibly trying to take the initiative before Hattusili, a more experienced commander could organize an army. With Hattusili's core troops being Kaskans loyal to him. Quickly Mursili's force were driven into retreat. With few Hittite vassal states joining the war, partly due to the war being short. In his reconstruction of events, Bryce thinks Mursili retreated to Samuha next, Samuha a formiddable fortress would've required a protracted siege. Here Hattusili negotiated Mursili's surrender, sparing his life, granting Mursili his freedom and a fiefdom in exchange of Mursili's quick surrender. Sippaziti had supported Mursili in the war and were now exiled too.

== Aftermath ==
After the war, Ḫattušili took the throne and Muršili was sent into exile. Ḫattušili initially feared that he would be viewed as an illegitimate usurper and took careful measures to consolidate his position. Domestically, he offered justifications to his subjects and promised lenience towards Muršili's former supporters. In later royal propaganda, Ḫattušili tried to downplay his actions as not having been a revolt but rather divine judgement by Ishtar. Internationally he sought recognition, especially from the club of great powers and eventually managed to gain this via signing the Egyptian–Hittite peace treaty. Remarkably, the Hittite copy of this treaty included provisions that would require the Egyptians to intervene on behalf of Ḫattušili if he were ever dethroned.

Muršili's ultimate fate is unknown. He was initially granted the fiefdom of Nuhašše in Syria, from which he attempted to maintain his claim to the Hittite throne. After Ḫattušili discovered these attempts, Muršili fled to Egypt. Ḫattušili requested his extradition, prompting an exchange of harshly worded letters with Ramesses II, who denied all knowledge of Muršili's whereabouts. Although the evidence is sparse and its interpretation highly uncertain, a later rule of Tarḫuntašša named Hartapu may have been Muršili's son.

Benteshina, a descendant of Aziru, was placed back on the throne of Amurru. He was an important intelligence source for Hattusili and an important early vassal supporter of his rule, after the war. Amurru was also an important buffer against an invasion through Syria into Hatti.

Muršili's brother Kurunta would eventually go on to claim the throne by force in a similar manner to Ḫattušili did, around 1228 BC, then from Ḫattušili's own direct descendant.
