= Near Eastern bioarchaeology =

Archaeological sub-discipline

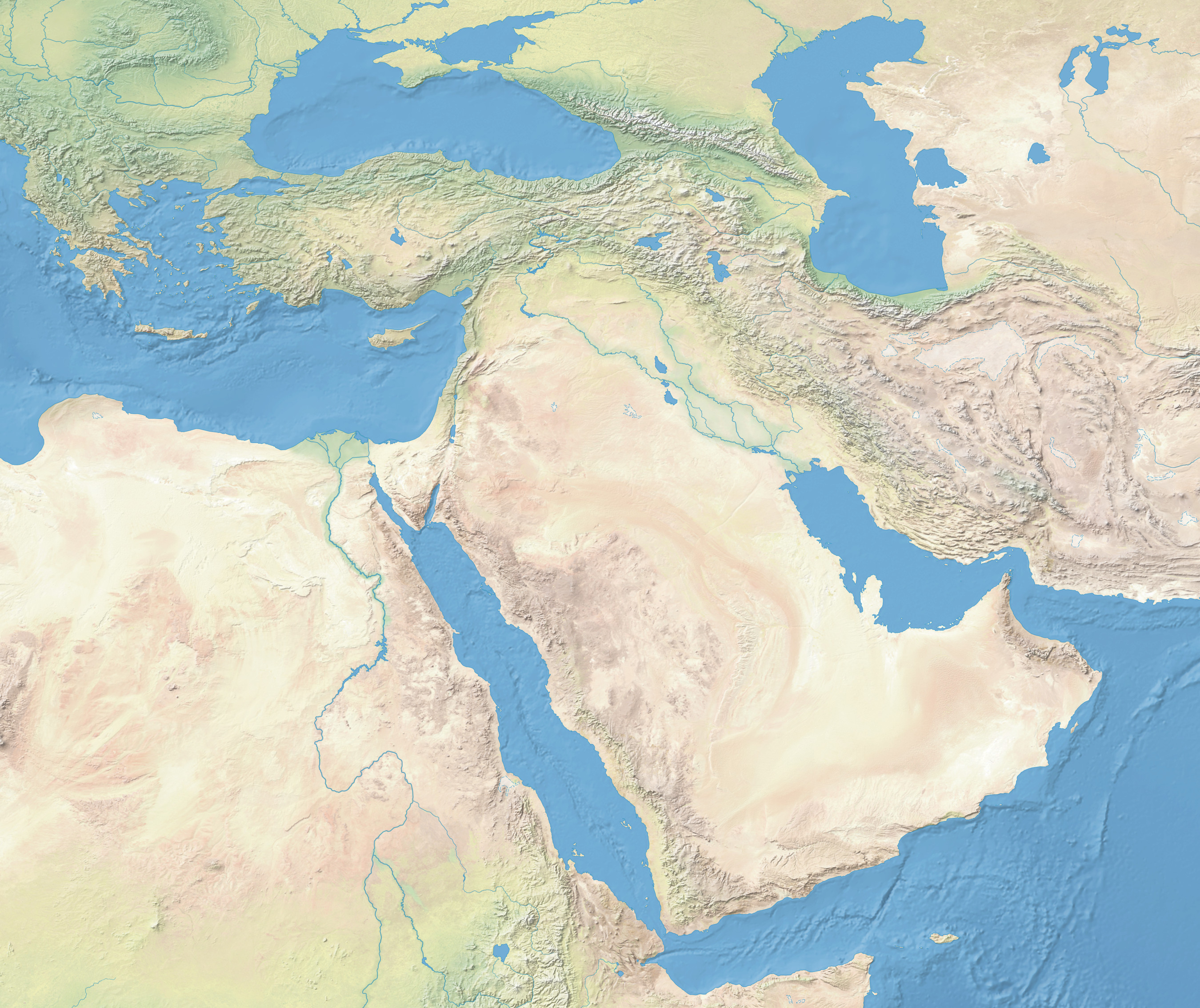
Map of the Middle East.

Near Eastern bioarchaeology covers the study of human skeletal remains from archaeological sites in Cyprus, Egypt, Levantine coast, Jordan, Turkey, Iran, Saudi Arabia, Qatar, Kuwait, Bahrain, United Arab Emirates, Oman, and Yemen.

Recent years have seen increased contributions in the application of bioarchaeological methods in investigating past populations in many areas around the world. Human osteological studies in the early 20th century were mostly descriptive and often overlooked the synthesis of biological, archaeological and historical narratives. It is only in the 1970s that bioarchaeology gained traction in concurrence with a change in the methodological approaches occurring in biological anthropology. In the Eastern Mediterranean these trends are exemplified in the seminal work on ancient population dynamics and health by J. Lawrence Angel, which prompted scholars from various backgrounds (e.g. archaeologists, anthropologists, prehistorians/historians, biological anthropologists) to communicate at a multi-disciplinary level. This facilitated and promoted research that relied on contextually informed perspectives of the human past, for example, bioarchaeologists began to analyze data at the level of a population rather than at an individual level, and then they integrated their results within the environmental and historical context.

In the Near East, bioarchaeological research has also witnessed an important advancement as the synthesis of bioarchaeological data with other lines of evidence is being systematically utilized to explore the lives of past populations in this archaeologically rich area. Such developments are often occurring within highly challenging socio-political contexts as certain countries (e.g. Syria, Yemen) are experiencing civil unrest and going through massive political upheaval. Nonetheless, there is an active trend of increasing and more integrated bioarchaeology projects in the Near East, which is anticipated to enhance our understanding on the diachronic interplay between ecological, socio-cultural, and political-economic developments in the region.

== Activity (degenerative changes) ==
=== Entheseal Changes ===
Egypt

Tendons or ligaments connect muscles to bones through a connective tissue referred to as enthesis. The muscle attachment sites on the skeleton often manifest morphological changes (new bone formation or bone resorption), which are called ‘entheseal changes’ (ECs). The expression of ECs is highly dependent upon an individual’s age, body mass and other factors; however, ECs have also been widely utilized in the field of bioarchaeology to reconstruct activity patterns.

Osama Refai, from the National Research Centre in Cairo, studied two assemblages from the Old Kingdom (2700 – 2190 c. BCE) in Giza that belong to two distinct economic classes: a) workers; b) high officials. Location of the burials, tomb architecture, funerary artifacts, and tomb engravings were used to distinguish between the different socio-economic classes. ECs were used to test for any correlation they exhibit with activity patterns and social class. Indeed, the expression of ECs between the two social classes revealed that workers were more actively engaging in stress-related activities. So, by combining funerary data, demographic patterns (age and sex), and activity patterns, ECs were successfully used to explore division of labour in ancient Egypt.

=== Osteoarthritis ===
Turkey

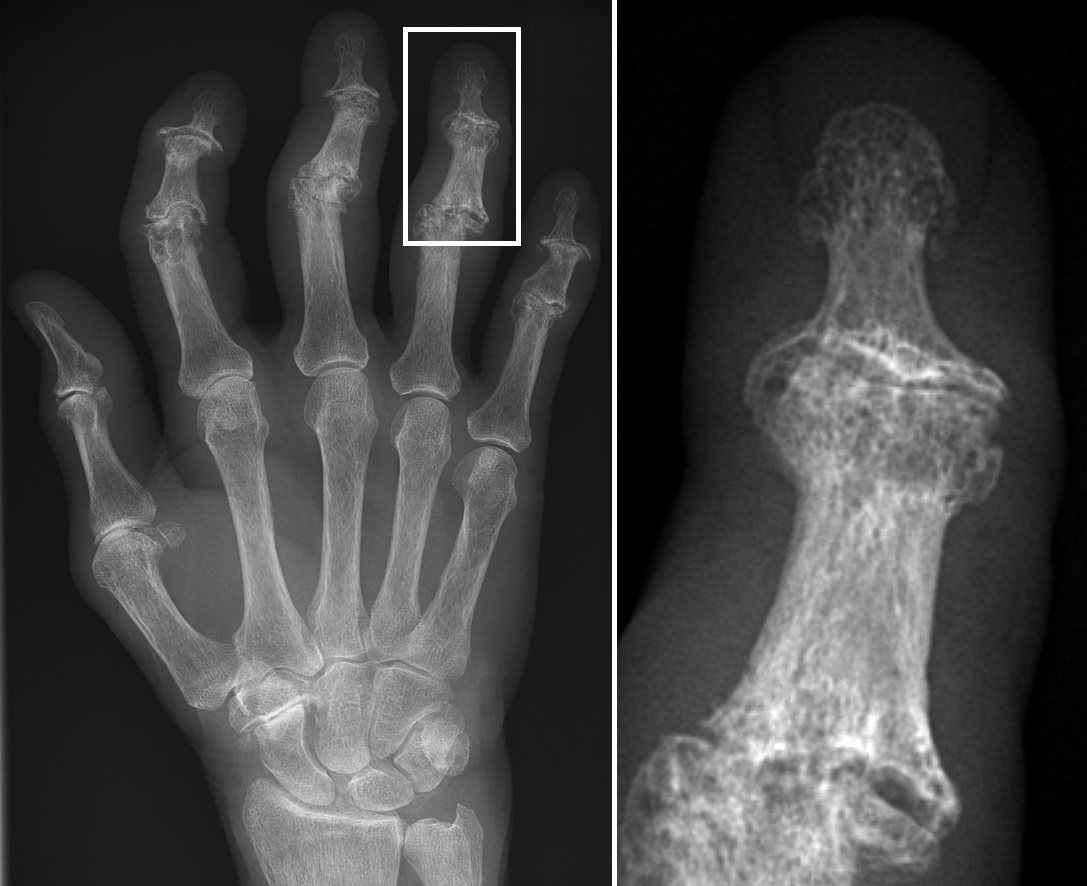
Erosive lesions and marginal lipping associated with hand OA.

Osteoarthritis (OA) is a degenerative joint disease that affects the junctions of articulating elements, or synovial joints (e.g. knee, shoulder) and is characterized by the damage of cartilage. OA is the most commonly documented pathology found in archaeological human remains and has been used extensively as an activity marker that reflects stress-related activity patterns or occupation. Factors such as age, sex, body size and others also affect its expression.

Kathryn Marklein from the Ohio State University explored the prevalence of OA between two Roman period (2nd – 3rd c. CE) skeletal assemblages retrieved from mass graves in Oymaağaç, Vezirköprü, Turkey. It was previously indicated through the analyses of non-metric traits that several individuals from one of the mass graves demonstrated biological relatedness with each other. In order to establish an approach for the evaluation of a possible genetic and socio-historical context correlated with OA, Marklein’s aim was to test if comparing different OA distribution patterns between familial and non-familial groups can indicate familial relatedness at Oymaağaç. Ten synovial joints were selected for the study among adults from site 1 (17 individuals) and site 2 (23 individuals). The study found no significant data to suggest a correlation between OA and different burial group, nor a correlation between OA and biologically related individuals.

=== Spinal Arthritis ===
Jordan

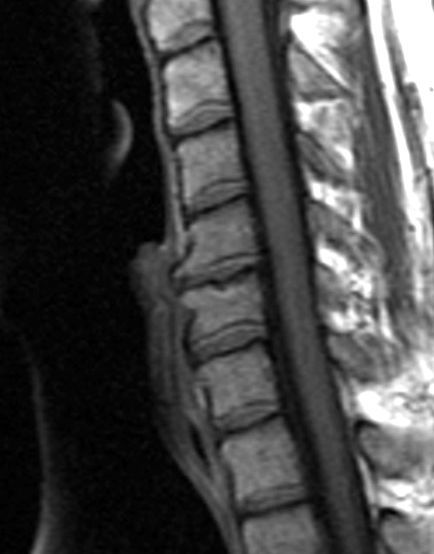
Cervical Spine MRI showing degenerative discs and bone spurs.

Degenerative changes observed on the intervertebral joints are not considered osteoarthritis (OA) strictly speaking, since OA only affects synovial joints, whereas intervertebral joints are amphiarthrodial, i.e. cartilaginous joints that allow for mild or minimal movement of the articulating elements. Nonetheless, osteoarthritis and spinal arthritis have a very similar manifestation and they are often grouped together in the bioarchaeological literature. Bioarchaeological and clinical studies have demonstrated that the manifestation of spinal arthritis is linked to factors such as age, sex, body size, mechanical stress, bipedal posture, and others. As with OA, spinal arthritis has been traditionally used in bioarchaeological studies to explore different aspects of social and cultural parameters.

Lesley Gregoricka and Jaime Ullinger from the Ohio State University examined the changes in spinal degenerative disease frequencies of the cervical vertebrae from the Early Bronze Age (3150 – 2300 c. BCE) skeletal assemblage of Bab edh-Dhra’ in Jordan. The aim of the study was to confirm or refute whether an increase in sedentism at the site led to declining workloads. Analysis revealed that the frequency of spinal arthritis decreased from 21% to 13% across the Early Bronze Age at the site. This decrease over time was attributed to a reduction in physical stress on the neck resulting from changes associated with carrying loads on the head. Both authors go on to suggest that the semi-sedentary group of the EB IA (3150 – 3050 c. BCE) were probably practicing small-scale horticulture, yet leaving no significant archaeological remains behind; while the later sedentary group of the Early Bronze Age II-III (2900 – 2300 BCE) at Bab edh-Dhra’ lived year-round next to agricultural fields and streams, therefore, travelling shorter distances for transporting crops and water.

=== Schmorl’s Nodes ===
Jordan

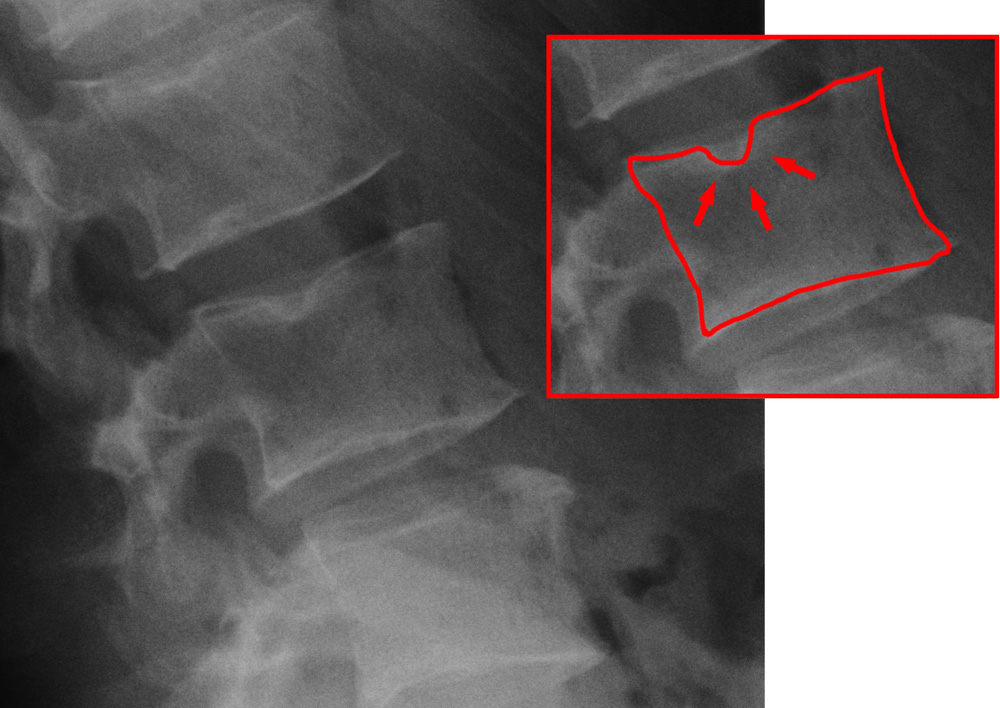
Spine MRI showing herniation of the vertebral bodies by the nucleus pulposus.

Compressive forces stressing the vertebral column as a result of mechanical loading often cause disc herniation. In turn, this facilitates the formation of cystic lesions referred to as Schmorl’s nodes on the superior and inferior vertebral endplates.

Sarah Henkle (Tulane University) and her colleagues from Dickinson college and Ohio State University examined the prevalence and intensity of Schmorl’s nodes in 366 adults and 91 subadults from the Early Bronze charnel house at Bab edh-Dhra’. The aim of the study was to analyze and identify patterns of activity-related differences between the local Jordanian skeletal assemblage and other European skeletal assemblages. The prevalence rates were compared to assemblages such as the Alepotrypa Cave in Greece and the site of Zmajevec in Croatia to test for regional differences. There were no significant differences in the manifestation of Schmorl’s nodes between adults and subadults from Bab edh-Dhra’. However, the Greek and Croatian skeletal assemblages did show significant differences in the incidence of Schmorl’s nodes when compared to the Jordanian assemblage. The authors attributed the relatively low frequency of Schmorl’s nodes in the individuals of Bab edh-Dhra’ to low levels of mechanical activity linked with higher social status.

=== Cross-Sectional Geometry ===
Egypt

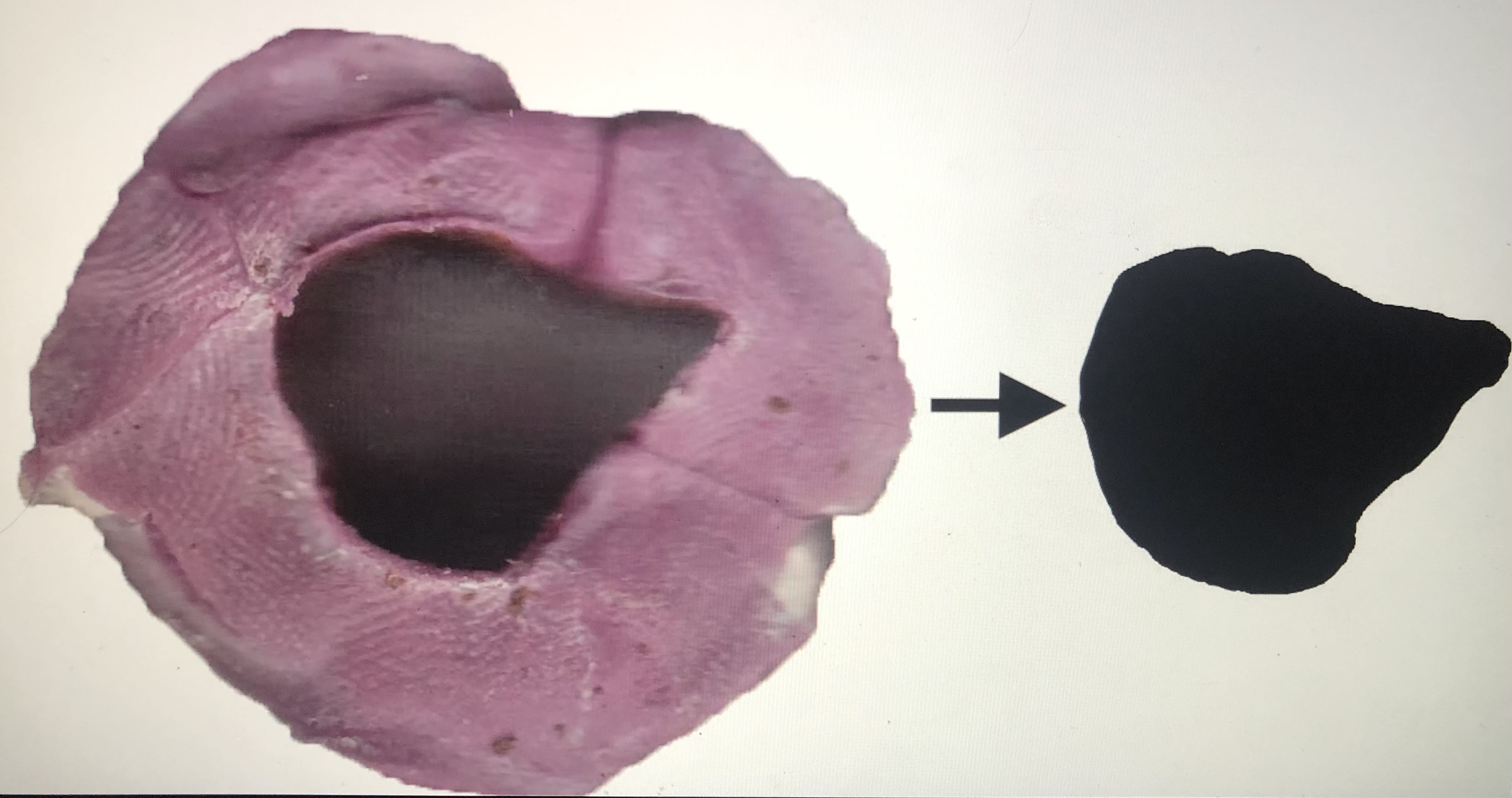
Periosteal mold of a right radius before and after digitization.The following cross-sectional properties are intended to be included in the analysis: 1) TA (total sub-periosteal area); 2) Ix and Iy (second moments of area); 3) Imax and Imin (second moments of area).

The skeleton, being a living tissue, adapts to stresses by depositing new bone along the axes that are enduring mechanical strain. As a result, cross-sectional geometric properties (CSG) of long bone diaphyses can be utilized to explore the effect of physical activity on different human groups. These properties express rigidity to bending loads applied at different directions, as well as rigidity to torsional and tensile forces.

A group of Egyptian scientists (Moushira Erfan Zaki, Ayman A. Azaba, Walaa Yousef, Eslam Y. Wassal, Hala T. El-Bassyouni) from the National Research Centre and Cairo University evaluated the CSG properties of two ancient Egyptian skeletal assemblages belonging to different curial classes exhibiting varied habitual activities. Long bone (humeri, femora, tibiae) CSG properties of 103 high ranking officials and 71 workers were obtained through CT images. Analysis of the CSG properties revealed that male workers had higher cortical thickness (more bone deposition) for all long bones. Female workers also presented higher values for the cortical thickness of their long bones when compared to the high officials. The workers’ (both males and females) higher level of skeletal robusticity when compared to the high officials is indicative of differing levels of activity and physical workload between different social classes.

== Trauma ==
Cyprus

Traumatic skeletal lesions are divided into fractures, dislocations, and surgical procedures. Trauma research within the context of archaeological human groups can provide important insights into aspects of past warfare, intra-group violence, and occupational accident rates. The study of trauma can also help explore aspects of ancient care and social support as attested through the knowledge of ancient medicine.

Sherry Fox from the Arizona State University, and her colleagues, explored traumatic patterns from different Early Christian church/basilica sites in Cyprus: Agios Georgios Hill, Nicosia, Kalavasos-Kopetra, Alassa-Ayia Mavri, and Maroni-Petrera. The Hill of Agios Georgios is situated inland adjacent to the Pediaios River outside the Venetian walled city of Nicosia, while the rest of the sites are located near the south coast. The aim of the study was to identify trauma patterns between the smaller, coastal sites and the larger, inland site. Trauma patterns, attributed to demographic differences, were evident between the inland and coastal sites, with a higher prevalence attested at the inland site of the Hill of Agios Georgios. A second difference was that males at the Hill of Agios Georgios had a higher propensity for traumatic lesions in the upper body and hand extremities, and this has been suggested to be caused by reasons beyond demographic parameters. The authors suggest that additional factors such as cultural, behavioral, and/or occupational differences, may account for the differences observed between the inland and coastal sites.

== Oral Health ==
=== Dental Diseases ===
Oman

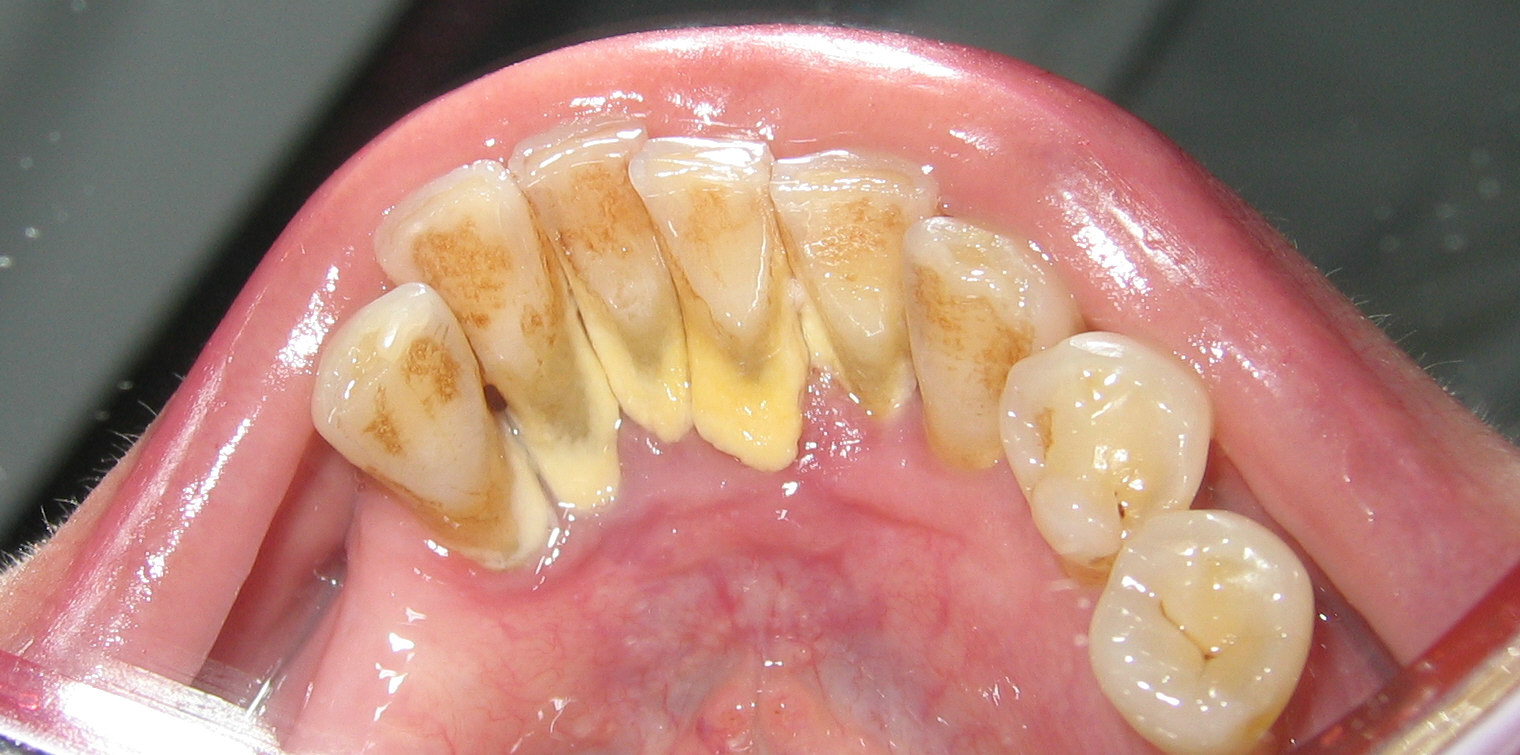
Photographic representation of calculus on the lingual of the mandibular anterior teeth.

Taphonomic alterations seldom affect the teeth in the archaeological record because teeth have a high inorganic content, hence, they provide permanent records of a range of diseases. Periodontal disease, carious lesions, periapical cavities, dental calculus, intense dental wear, and ante-mortem tooth loss (AMTL) are dental conditions that are systematically recorded and studied in archaeological skeletal assemblages. Dental diseases are especially relevant because they can provide indirect evidence of a person’s type of diet during life. Furthermore, examination of the angle of tooth wear visible on the tooth crown may help differentiate dietary shifts between human populations (e.g. distinguishing hunter-gatherers and later agriculturalists).

Greg Nelson and John Lukacs from the University of Oregon and Paul Yule from the Ruprecht-Karls Universität-Heidelberg in Germany analyzed AMTL, dental caries, and dental attrition in thirty-seven individuals dating to the late Iron Age in the Sultanate of Oman (100 c. BCE – 300 CE). The dental caries frequency was 35.5% and it seems that the caries onset in permanent molars began soon after eruption. AMTL occurred in 100% of preserved mandibles with frequent complete alveolar remodeling. The authors attribute the patterns observed in diets high in fermentable carbohydrates, known to be highly cariogenic (e.g. dates).

=== Linear Enamel Hypoplasia ===
Jordan

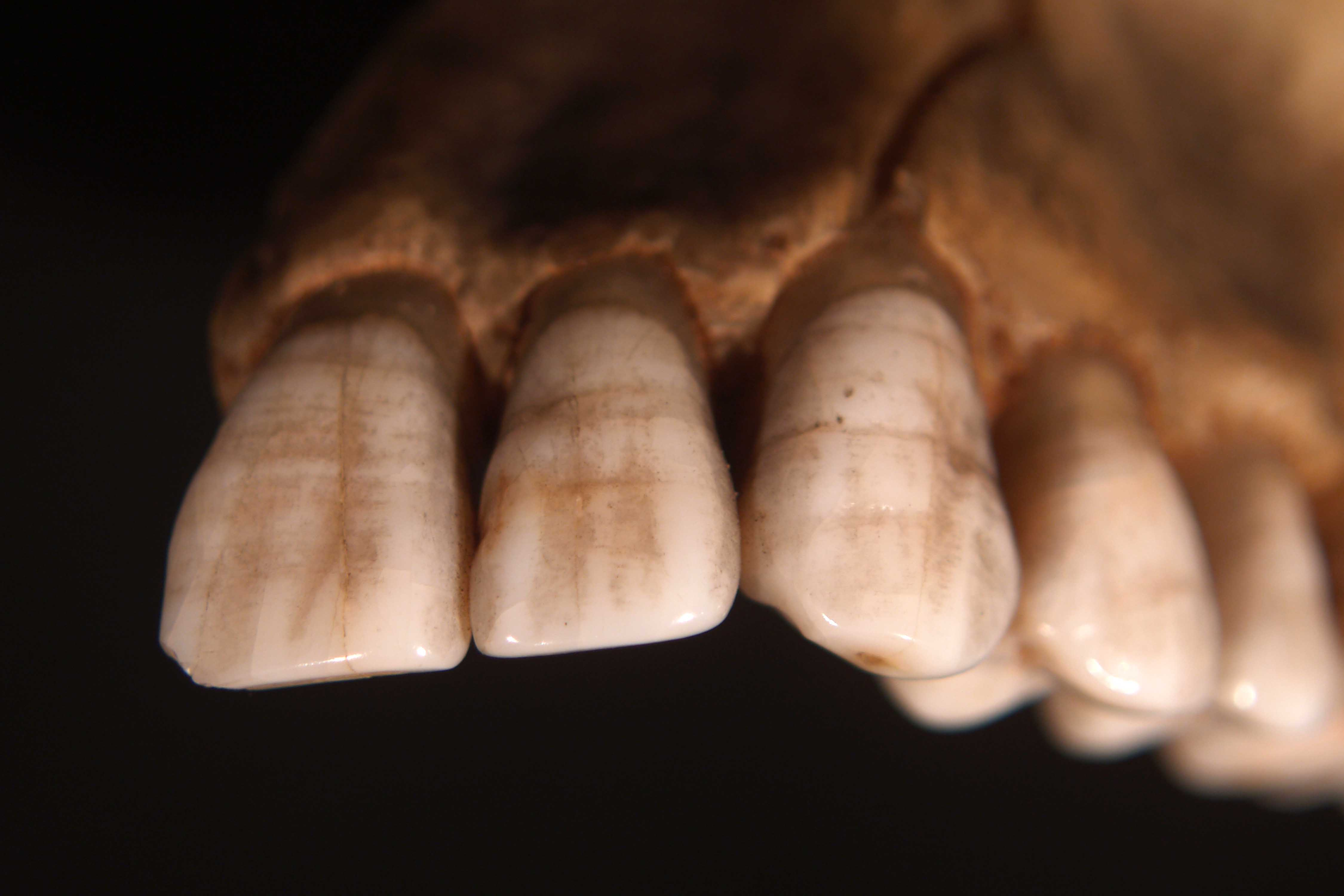
Teeth displaying enamel hypoplasia lines, linear defects of enamel that form during crowns development.

Linear enamel hypoplasia is not a disease itself, but a physiological defect resulting from the disturbance in the secretion of enamel during crown development. The condition is macroscopically visible as discrete pits or horizontal furrows to large deep grooves on the crown surface. The condition’s aetiology is multifactorial, but it appears to be a non-specific indicator of physiological stress related to metabolic stresses, hereditary abnormalities, childhood fevers, and major infection.

Rebecca Griffin and Denise Donlon from the University of Liverpool and the University of Sydney studied the dental remains of individuals from the Early Iron Age (1100 – 900 c. BCE) site of Pella in Jordan. The aim of their study was to analyze the presence of linear and pit enamel hypoplasia, and investigate the aetiology of enamel hypoplasia by comparing the results with age and sex. 72 male teeth and 148 female teeth were analyzed and showed similar percentages in the prevalence of enamel hypoplasia. Yet, juveniles showed lower prevalence of the condition than adults. When comparing the different types of enamel hypoplasia, adults had a higher prevalence of linear enamel hypoplasia and pit enamel hypoplasia arrays, but a similar prevalence of single pit enamel hypoplasia as juveniles. The authors suggest that the occurrence of various forms of hypoplasia observed in the skeletal assemblage from Pella may imply that single pit enamel hypoplasia has a different aetiology to linear enamel hypoplasia and pit enamel hypoplasia.

== Biodistance ==
=== Dental Nonmetric Traits ===
Syria

Dental nonmetric traits have been extensively utilized in bioarchaeological studies for over a century. Morphological variation in teeth manifests through several nonmetric traits, which are subtle variants in the shape of the tooth crown, shape and number of roots, and number of teeth present. These traits offer a source of information on biological affinities between human populations and/or subgroups as their expression is in part controlled genetically. Therefore, studies of dental nonmetric traits are often used to determine gene flow and kinship patterns and construct phylogenetic trees of populations under study.

Arkadiusz Sołtysiak and Marta Bialon from the University of Warsaw recorded and analyzed fifty-nine dental non-metric traits in 350 human skeletons. The skeletons were retrieved from three sites (Tell Ashtara, Tell Masaikh, and Jebel Mashtale) in the lower Euphrates dating from the Early Bronze Age up to the Early Islamic period (Umayyad and Abbasid) and modern period. The results suggested that no major gene flow occurred in the middle Euphrates valley between the 3rd millennium BCE and the early 2nd millennium CE. However, the Mongolian invasion and the subsequent large depopulation in the northern parts of Mesopotamia in the 13th c. CE did instigate genetic heterogeneity. Another major population change occurred in the 17th c. CE after Bedouin tribes from the Arabian Peninsula took over large parts of Mesopotamia.

== Palaeopathology ==
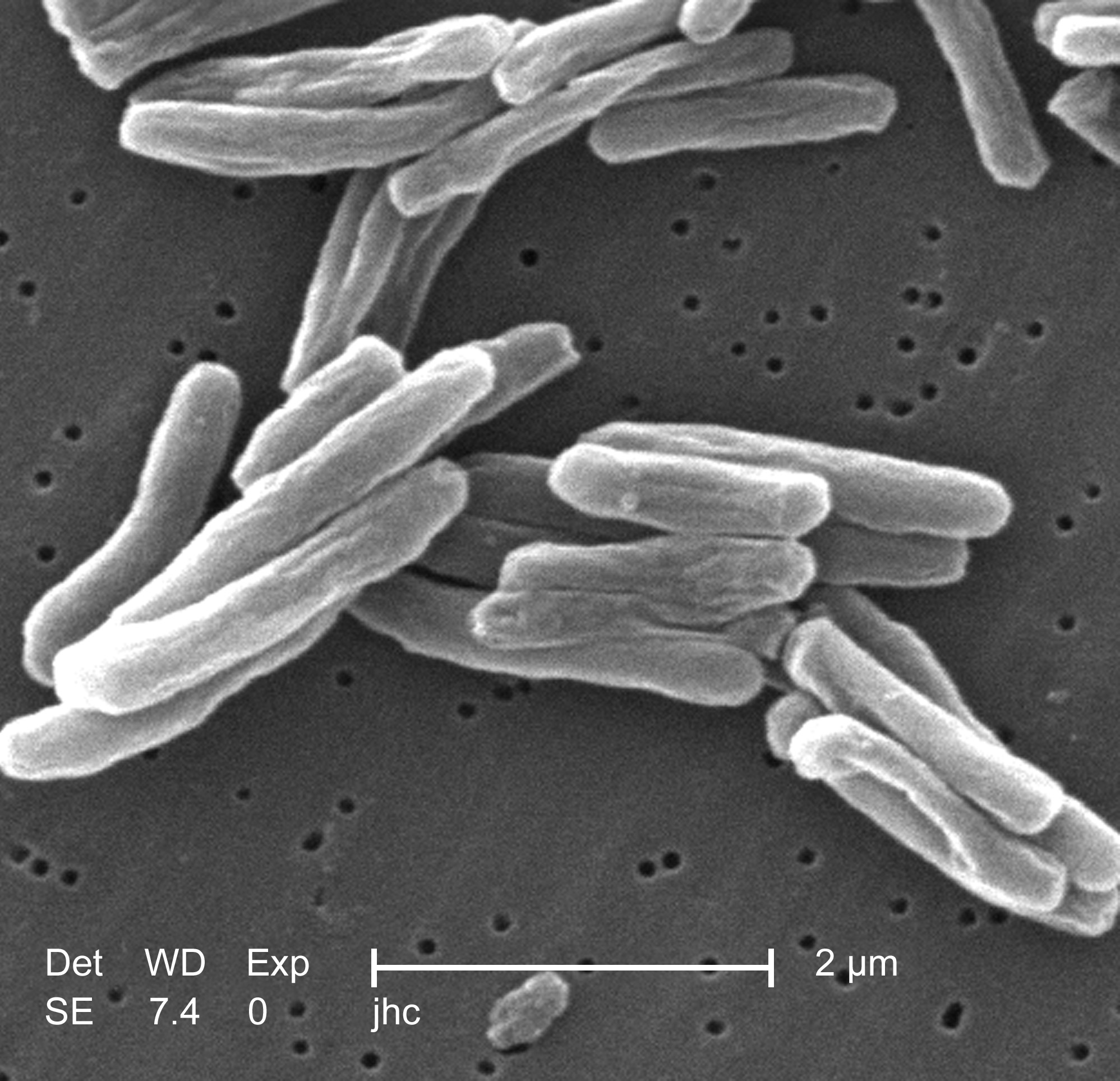
Scanning electron micrograph (SEM) depicted some of the ultrastructural details seen in the cell-wall configuration of a number of Gram-positive Mycobacterium tuberculosis bacteria.

Syria

Palaeopathology is the scientific study of disease processes and progress through time as manifested on skeletal remains and mummified soft tissues. Palaeopathological research constitutes a key and important part of bioarchaeology, as it examines health in past populations, and the evolution of various diseases.

Jacek Tomczyk and a team from Poland and the United Kingdom have examined a 30 – 34-year-old female from Tell Masaikh in Syria and attempted to differentially diagnose multiple pathological conditions observed on the bones. Morphological, histological, radiological and molecular methods were applied in order to assess the pathological lesions. This led to the identification of some possible pathological conditions linked with the changes seen on the bones. Mycobacterium tuberculosis (MTB) and serious traumatic changes subsequent to a secondary infection were narrowed down in the differential diagnosis; however, MTB was not detected in the molecular analysis (ancient DNA). The authors stressed the complications associated with differentially diagnosing pathological conditions from ancient skeletal remains.

== Taphonomy ==
Bahrain

Taphonomy, derived from the Greek words taphos (burial) and nomos (law), is a term currently used to refer to the study of chemical and physical processes that operate after the death on an organism until the time of recovery. Archaeological and forensic studies use taphonomic methods to interpret postmortem processes altering the physical appearance or chemical state of the skeletal remains. Human-induced taphonomic modifications are also very useful in providing information associated with ancient mortuary practices.

Judith Littleton from the Australian National University has surveyed and studied the preservation rates from various Bronze Age sites on the Island of Bahrain. She suggests that there is a strong focus by scholars on examining the nature of social stratification within ancient societies by linking them with mortuary practices of empty burials. Usually, the premise of deliberately empty tombs in Bahrain has been accepted without any consideration of the normal processes of decay and destruction. Littleton goes on to highlight some of the issues involved in the preservation of human skeletal remains. She states the following factors that determine whether or not human skeletal remains will be recovered from burials: 1) treatment of the body before death; 2) method of burial; 3) decomposition of the body; 4) chemical actions upon bone; 5) mechanical actions upon bone; 6) disturbance of the body; 7) excavation and post-excavation activities. She ends her article by suggesting to take account of the intervening steps between burial in an ancient society and modern excavation of that burial by determining the state of preservation; this will allow for proper and systematic application of mortuary analysis.

== Geometric Morphometrics ==
Iraq

Geometric morphometrics is a shape-based analysis that analyzes landmark coordinates and captures morphologically distinct shape variables, by offering the possibility to control for the effect of size, position, and orientation, so that variables based on morphology can be discriminated. Many bioarchaeological studies use geometric morphometrics to explore biodistance in different human populations since anatomical morphological traits are influenced by developmental, functional, and evolutionary adaptations.

A Japanese team led by Naomichi Ogihara from the University of Kyoto performed three-dimensional analysis of the morphology of forty-five adult crania excavated from the Hamrin basin and adjacent areas in Northern Iraq. The aim was to investigate temporal variations in craniofacial shape from the Chalcolithic and Bronze Age to the Islamic period. Ten modern Japanese adult crania were also used for comparative purposes. The pre-Islamic period groups showed little variation and were mostly dolichocranic, whereas those in the Islamic period were more diverse displaying both dolichocranic and brachycranic traits. The authors state that their research serves as a basis for future comparative studies and to understand the origin of Mesopotamian inhabitants and their neighboring populations.

== Stable Isotope Analysis ==
Iran

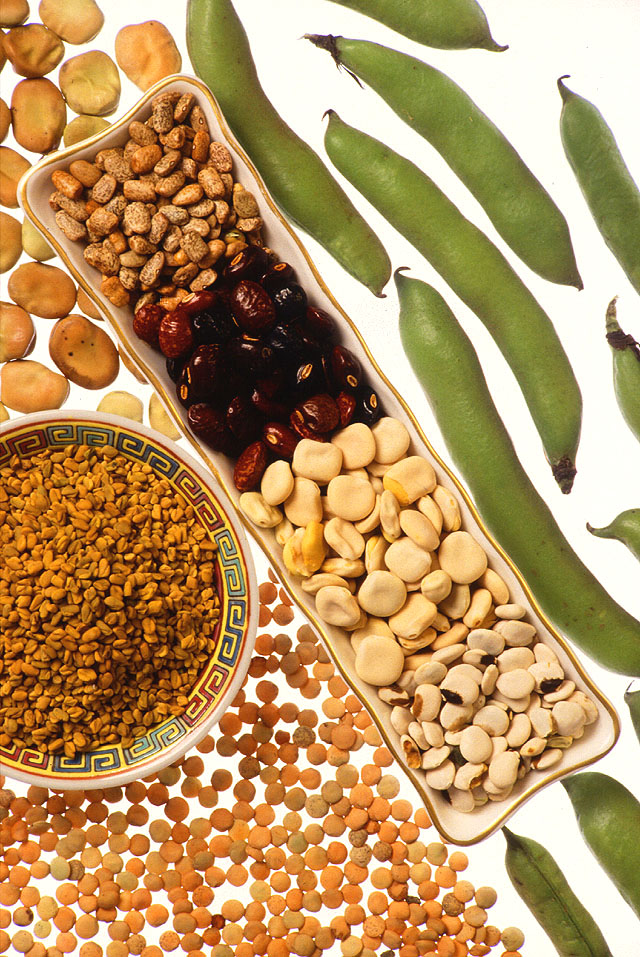
A selection of various C3 plants (legumes).

Knowledge about subsistence strategies in antiquity is important for understanding ancient civilizations. Stable isotopes of carbon and nitrogen in human bone reflect the chemistry of the diet, hence, they provide information on the consumption profile and the intake of different foods. Stable isotopes of carbon and nitrogen help differentiate between the variety of foodstuffs consumed, often classifying diets as high or low in animal-derived protein, C3 (e.g. trees, legumes, cereals) or C4 plants (e.g. millet, maize), and fish-based or not.

Zahra Afshara and a team of scientists from Durham University analyzed δ^{13}C and δ^{15}N in human bone collagen from 69 male and female adult skeletons from the site of Tepe Hissar. The study aimed to investigate the subsistence economy and dietary changes in a Chalcolithic and Bronze Age (5th – 2nd millennium BCE) skeletal assemblage retrieved from the central Iranian Plateau. Tepe Hissar witnessed a transition in socio-cultural and economic structures during the Chalcolithic and Bronze Age. As such, the team hypothesized that the subsistence economy and diet of the population will be affected because of the widespread socio-cultural and economic transitions. The results demonstrated no significant change in diet during the period under study and suggested a mixed diet based on C3 terrestrial plants, animal protein, and a limited share of fresh water resources. Therefore, the authors’ working hypothesis was not supported by the isotopic data, even though a remarkable cultural change was evidenced at the site. The authors attribute the consistency of the diet for three millennia to possible climate continuity in the region, therefore, maintaining the same food resources over time.

== Genetics ==
=== Lebanon ===
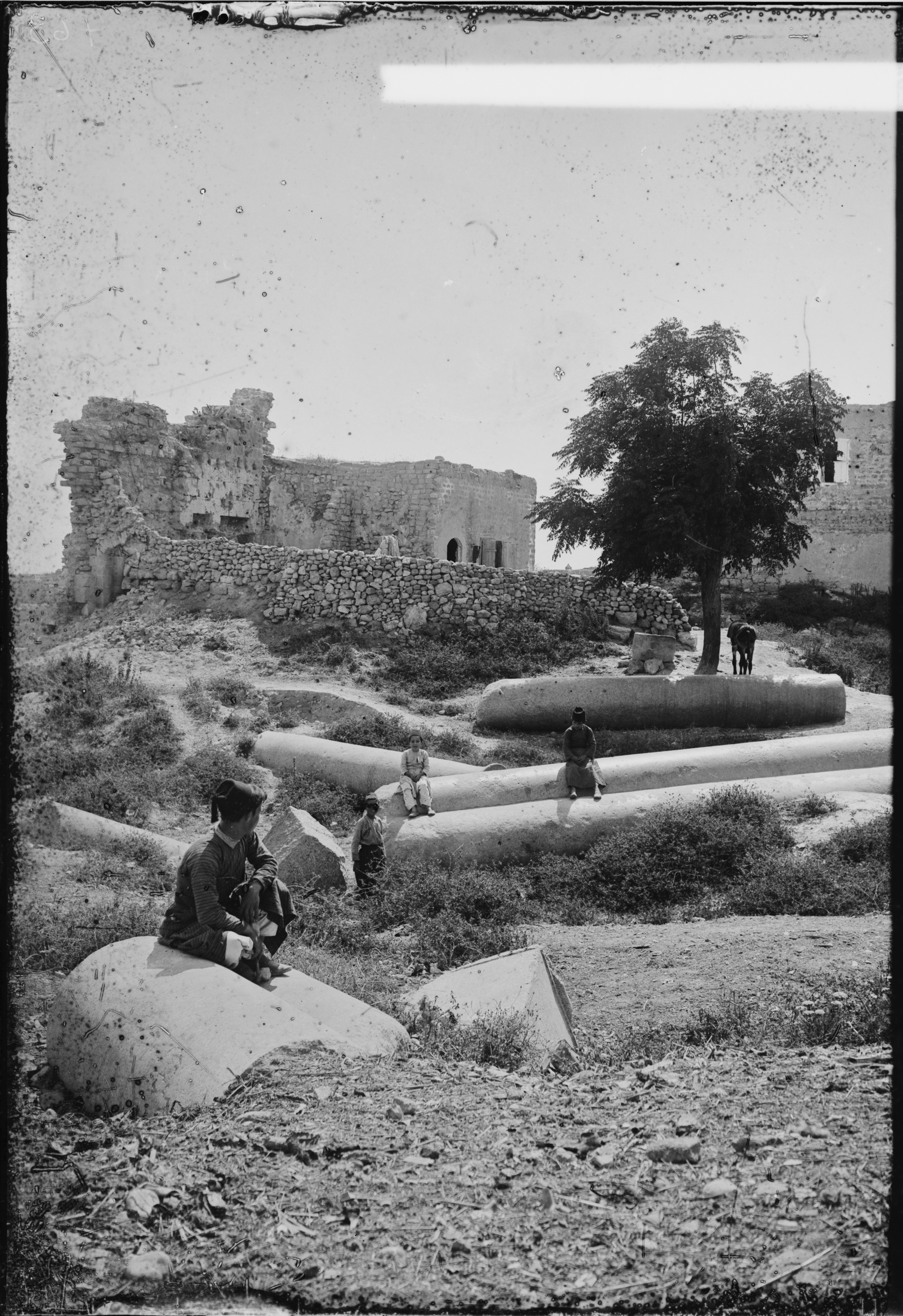
The ruins of the Crusader Cathedral from the 12th c. CE, where Holy Roman Emperor Frederick Barbarossa was supposedly buried, in the Southern Lebanese city of Tyre, photographed between 1900 and 1920.

Palaeogenomics, or the study of ancient DNA, uses techniques from molecular and evolutionary biology to deal with a range of questions about the origin of populations, their history and evolution, and the pathogens that co-evolve with the humans.

A team of archaeologists and geneticists led by Marc Haber from the Wellcome Sanger Institute in the United Kingdom sequenced the whole genomes of 13 individuals retrieved from different sites across Lebanon and dated between the 3rd – 13th c. CE. It is well known historically and archaeologically that hundreds of thousands of Europeans migrated to the Near East to actively engage in the Crusades. As a consequence, many of the European incomers settled in the newly established Christian states along the Eastern Mediterranean coast. The aim of the authors was to identify any admixture and continuity in the genetic makeup of the European settlers in the modern population of Lebanon. The first group of four individuals appeared to be local Near Easterners since they clustered with the present-day Lebanese. The second group, consisting of three individuals, clustered with different European populations (two Spaniards and one Sardinian). The third group, with two individuals, appeared to have an intermediate position between Europeans and Near Easterners, overlapping with Neolithic Anatolians, West Eurasian populations, Ashkenazi Jews, and South Italians; this provides direct evidence of admixture between the Crusaders and the local population. Nonetheless, the authors state that these mixtures have limited genetic consequences since signals of admixture with Europeans are not significant in any modern Lebanese ethnic group

== See also ==
- Demographics of the Middle East
- Near Eastern archaeology
