= Arma-Tarhunda's Family =

Arma-Tarhunda also Armadatta or Arma-Tarhunta was an influential Hittite royal during the 1200s BC. He and his sons were involved in dynastic feuding, primarily against Ḫattušili III and their lands were confiscated and they were exiled to Alashiya.

== Arma-Tarhunda ==
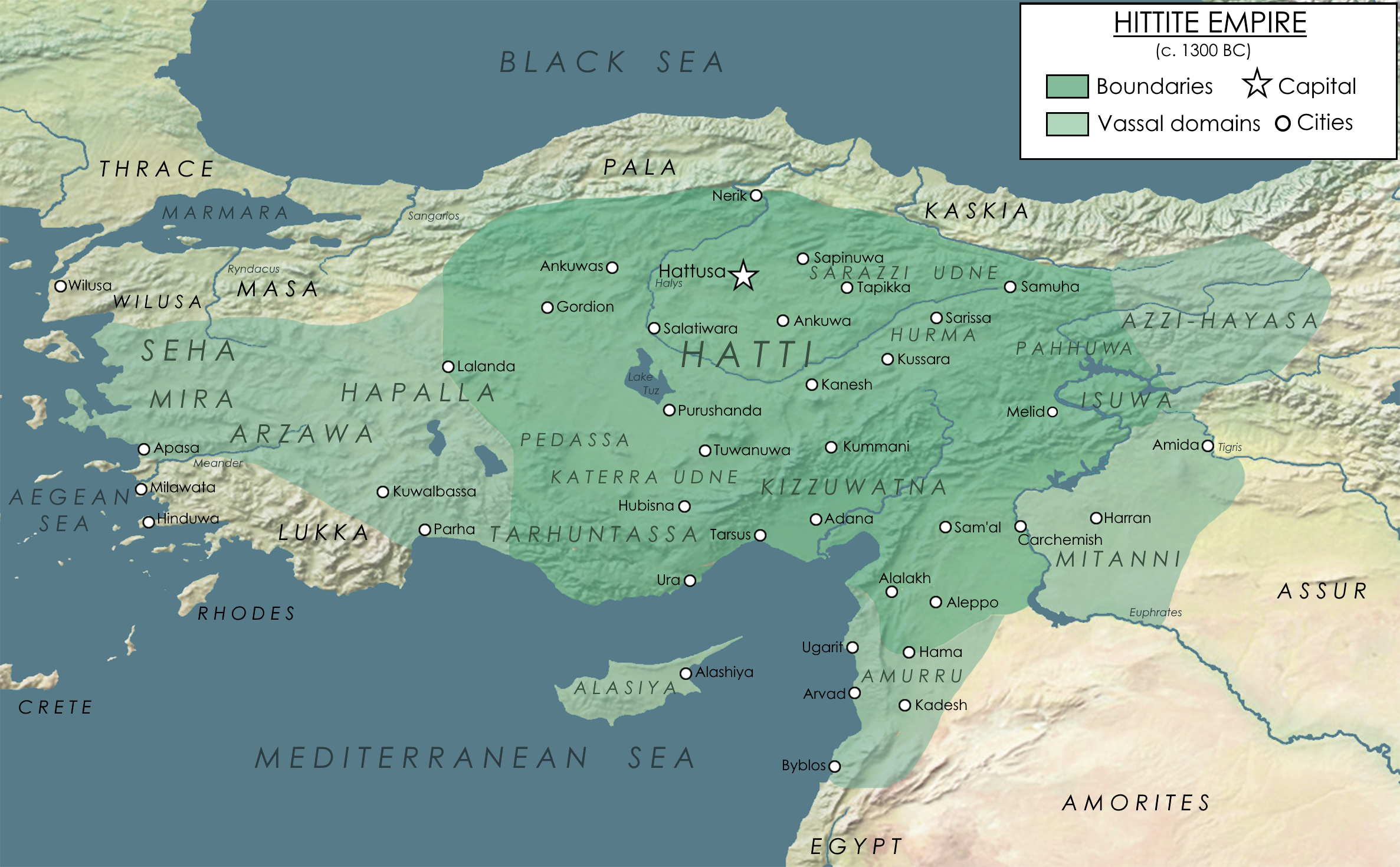
Sarazzi Utne is the same as the 'Upper Land' in English

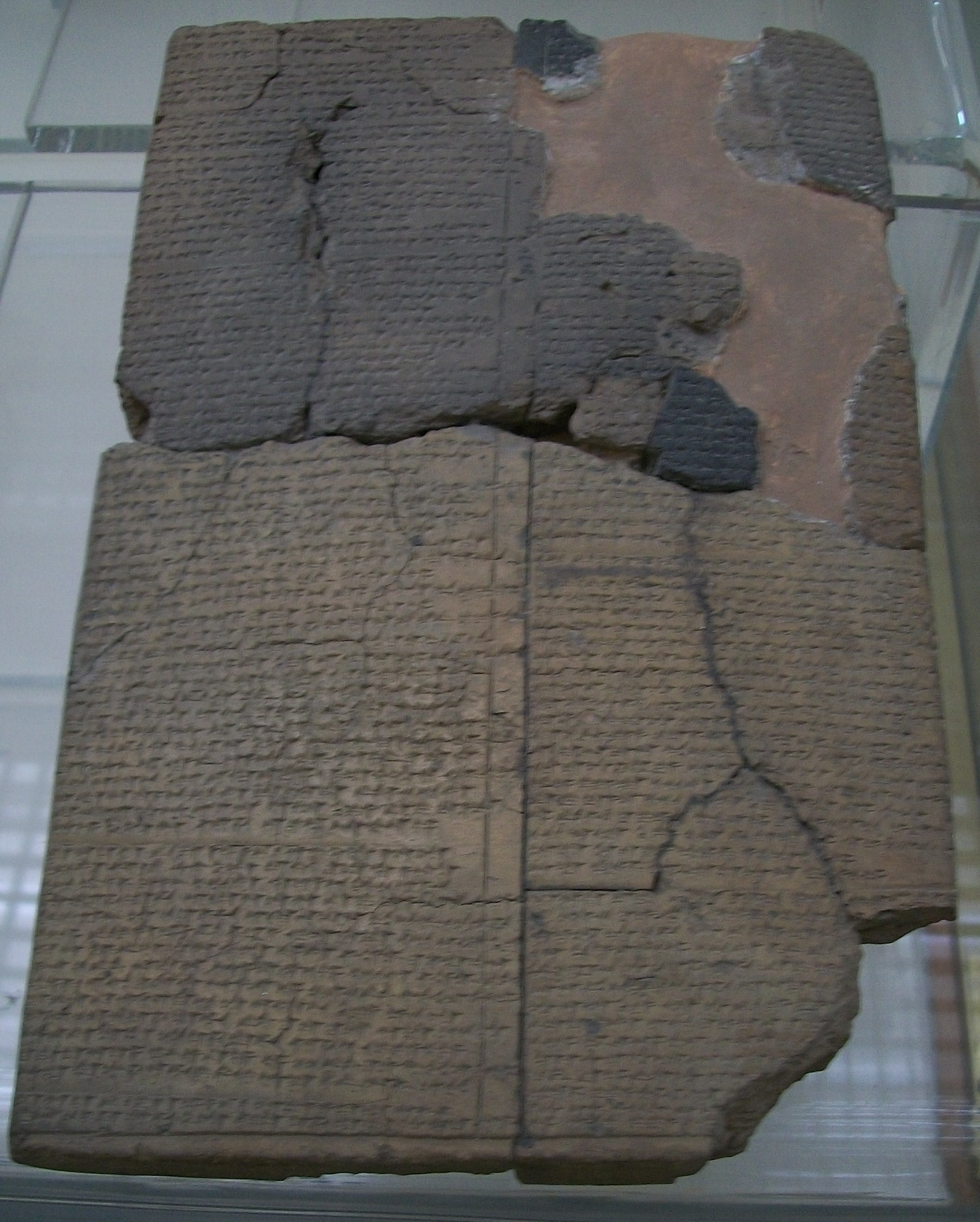
Apology of Hattušili, key to understanding these events

Arma-Tarhunda is considered a cousin of Mursili II and a son of Zida, and a second-cousin of Hattusili. Arma-Tarhunda potentially had an brother called Hudupiyanza, Hudupiyanza himself being an governor of Pala and son of Zida. Arma-Tarhunda was the Governor of the Upper Land before Hattusili III became the Great King. Hattusili was deemed a more competent governor and Arma-Tarhunda was removed from the position by Muwatalli II. Arma-Tarhunda grew resentful for this. The Upper Land was a large kingdom, with royals being assigned its governors which signifies its importance as the northern border kingdom. Maria Dąbrowska thinks Arma-Tarhunda didn't take his demotion lying down, calling it an "rebellion", stating that Arma-Tarhunda had launched an judicial procedure against Hattusili called an "divine wheel". To which Hattusili would later counter with his own lawsuit. Hattusili got exonerated in the divine wheel. Bryce suggest Mursili II appointed Arma-Tarhunda to this position while, the Great King to sack Arma-Tarhunda were Muwatalli II, son of Mursili II. Hattusili considered himself a victim of an hate campaign by Arma-Tarhunda. Arma-Tarhunda began plotting against Hattusili there after. Arma-Tarhunda, his wife and sons were spell-casters. Casting spells against someone was considered very much illegal in Hittite Law, it could come with the death penalty for an convicted offender. They targeted Hattusili and Ishtar's city of Samuha with these spells, that led to court proceedings. The sitting Great King Muwatalli (brother of Hattusili) had to preside as judge over this trial between Arma-Tarhunda's family and Prince Hattusili. Muwatalli would eventually rule in-favour of Hattusili, Arma-Tarhunda's family properties were confiscated, and Arma-Tarhunda were sent into exile to Alashiya as punishment. Separated from his family. His son Sippaziti had apparently not taken part in his father's witchcraft and was spared. While others think only half of Arma-Tarhunda's lands were confiscated and Arma-Tarhunda's wife and an son (brother to Sippaziti) were also exiled or that half of his lands were later restored as clemency by Hattusili.

== Sippaziti ==
Also Sipa-ziti. Sippaziti was the son of Arma-Tarhunda. Sippaziti sided with Muršili, sent to gather troops in the Upper Land, probably in exchange for restoration of the governorship of the Upper Land to his family. Sippaziti however wasn't very successful. Hattusili on the other hand gathered able Kaskan fighters to help him and were victorious against Mursili III and his allies, incl. Sippaziti. Sippaziti's support in the war resulted in exile as well.

== Other Members ==
Arma-Tarhunda had at least a wife and another son in addition to Sippaziti.
