= Agios Georgios Hill, Nicosia =

Coordinates: 35°09′55″N 33°21′20″E

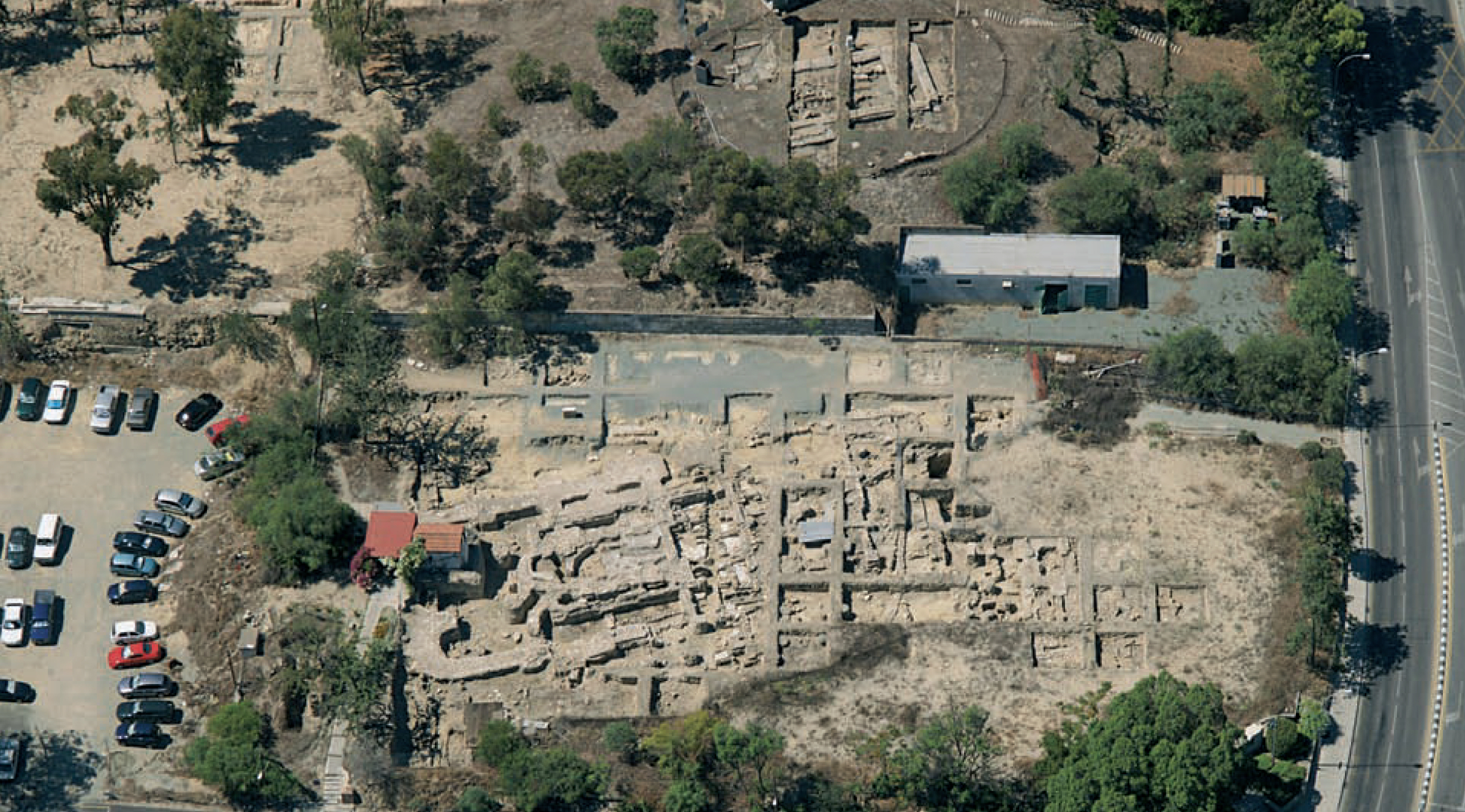
Aerial view of the northern part of the site, showing foundations of the excavated churches

Agios Georgios Hill is an archaeological site in Nicosia, Cyprus. The site is rich and complex, spanning almost the entire history of Nicosia from the Chalcolithic through the Byzantine and Lusignan periods. Presumably, this is the site of the ancient kingdom of Ledra, the Ledra City Archeological Museum is adjacent. The surveyed archaeological area is about 650 m2, the whole area measuring 49500 m2. The hill is adjacent to the Ministry of Interior (Cyprus) and the Ministry of Finance. A small chapel of St George the Healer (Άγιος Γεώργιος Θεραπευτής) stands on the eastern edge of the excavated area.

== Discovery and excavation ==
Excavation in the north part of the archaeological site started fortuitously in 1996 as a rescue operation after the old building of the Pancyprian Public Servants' Trade Union was demolished to make way for the construction of the House of Representatives. The trade union acronym (PA.SY.D.Y) is often used in the listing of the site. Campaigns of excavation have continued on a regular basis since the discovery. The technique used over much of the site was the Wheeler–Kenyon method of Mortimer Wheeler, with each excavated square measuring 4×4 m.

== Findings ==
=== Hellenistic period ===
A rich series of finds have been found at Agios Georgios, most notably from Hellenistic times A hoard of silver coins of the 5th century BCE, the oldest discovered in Cyprus at the time of find in 2006, contributes to the history of Nicosia and indirectly confirms the location of Ledra, one of the independent city-kingdoms that is traditionally located in Nicosia.

=== Byzantine and Lusignan periods ===
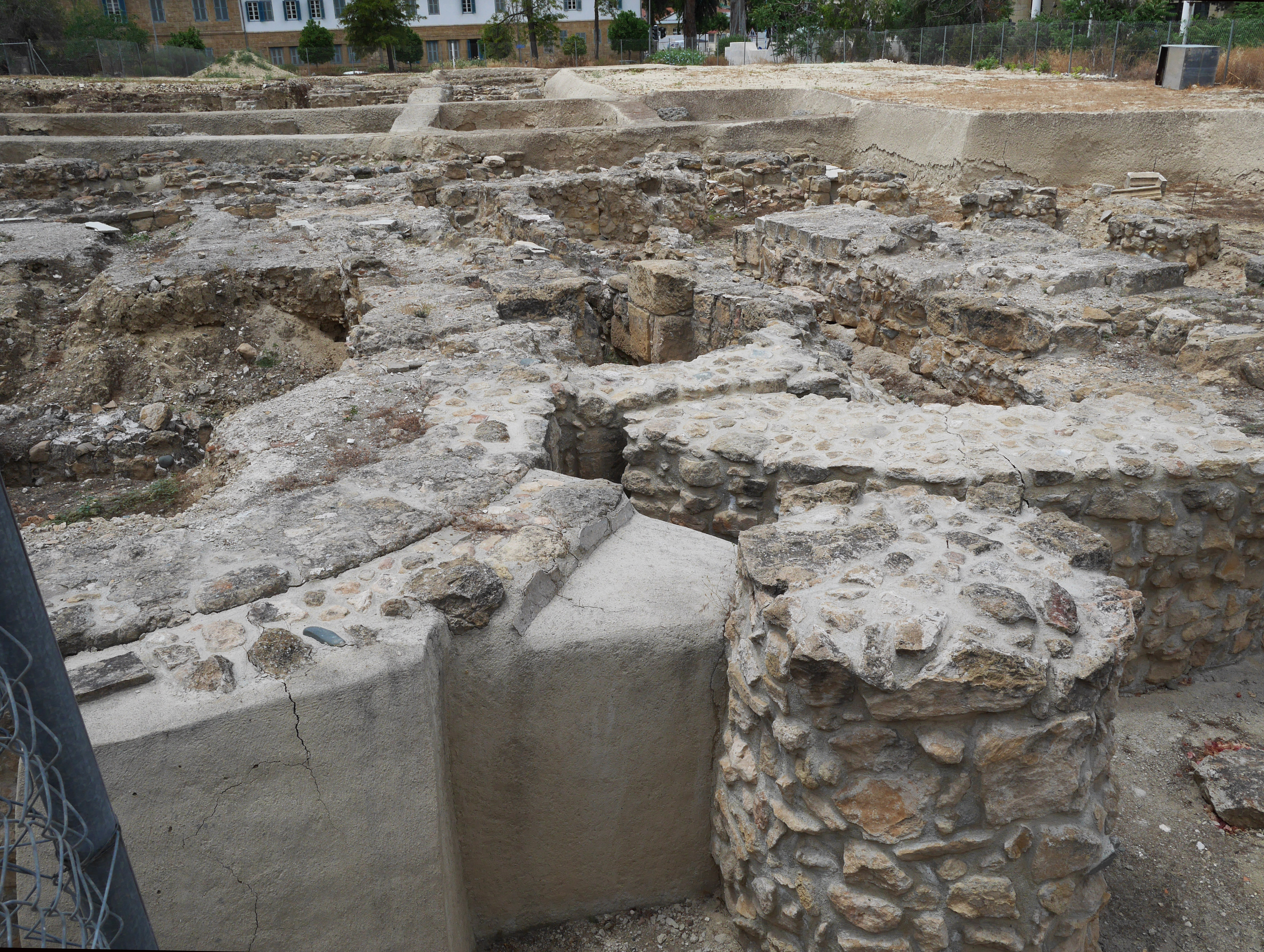
Church apses exposed by excavation, condition in 2017

The succession of three medieval churches have been excavated and reported by Despina Pilides. Remains of carved mouldings in the Gothic style, and vaulted chambers of finely cut ashlar, show the church was rebuilt in the circa 14th century. Tassos Papacostas has suggested this may be the church of Saint George of Mangana.

== Analysis ==
=== Palaeopathology ===
Sherry Fox, Ioanna Moutafi, Eleanna Prevedorou and Despina Pilides analysed trauma patterns in 82 individuals from four sites in early Christian Cyprus. Three rural sites near the south coast, i.e. Kalavasos-Kopetra, Alassa-Ayia Mavri, and Maroni-Petrera and the hill of Agios Georgios furnished the dataset. Their results showed of the 24 adults recovered from Agios Georgios, 16 (67%) showed some kind of pathological lesion, while the remaining 8 (33%) present evidence of single trauma. On the other hand, among the 21 adults from the coastal sites, 9 (43%) show some sort of pathological lesion and only 4 (19%) display evidence of single or multiple trauma. The authors posited that the higher proportions in the case of the inland site could be explained by demographic differences between the two groups of samples.

== Endangered status ==
Despite the manifest importance of the site in the centre of Nicosia, International Council on Monuments and Sites has not listed Agios Georgios hill as endangered.
