= Amarna letter EA 39 =

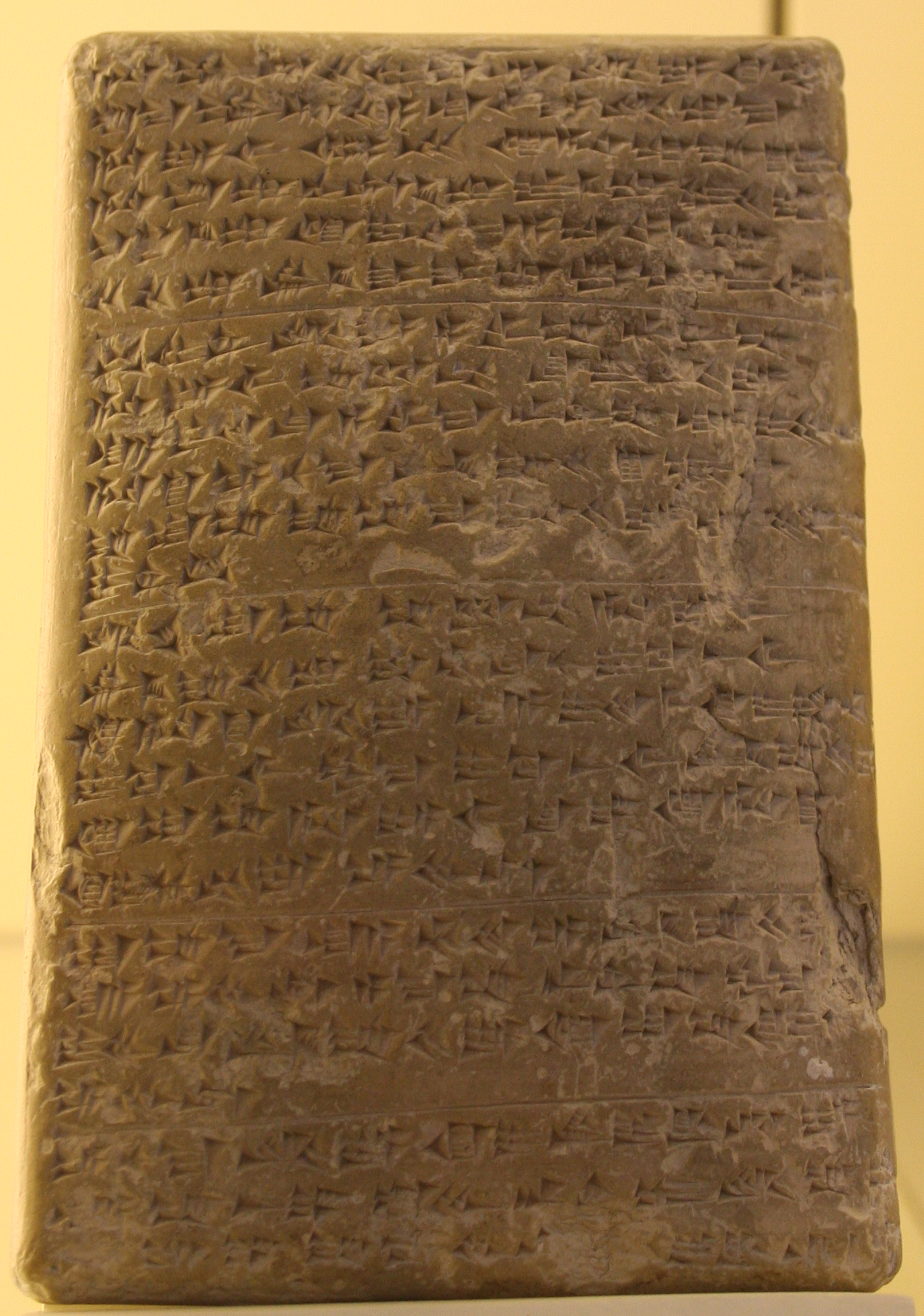
EA 38, Obverse (high-resolution expandable photo

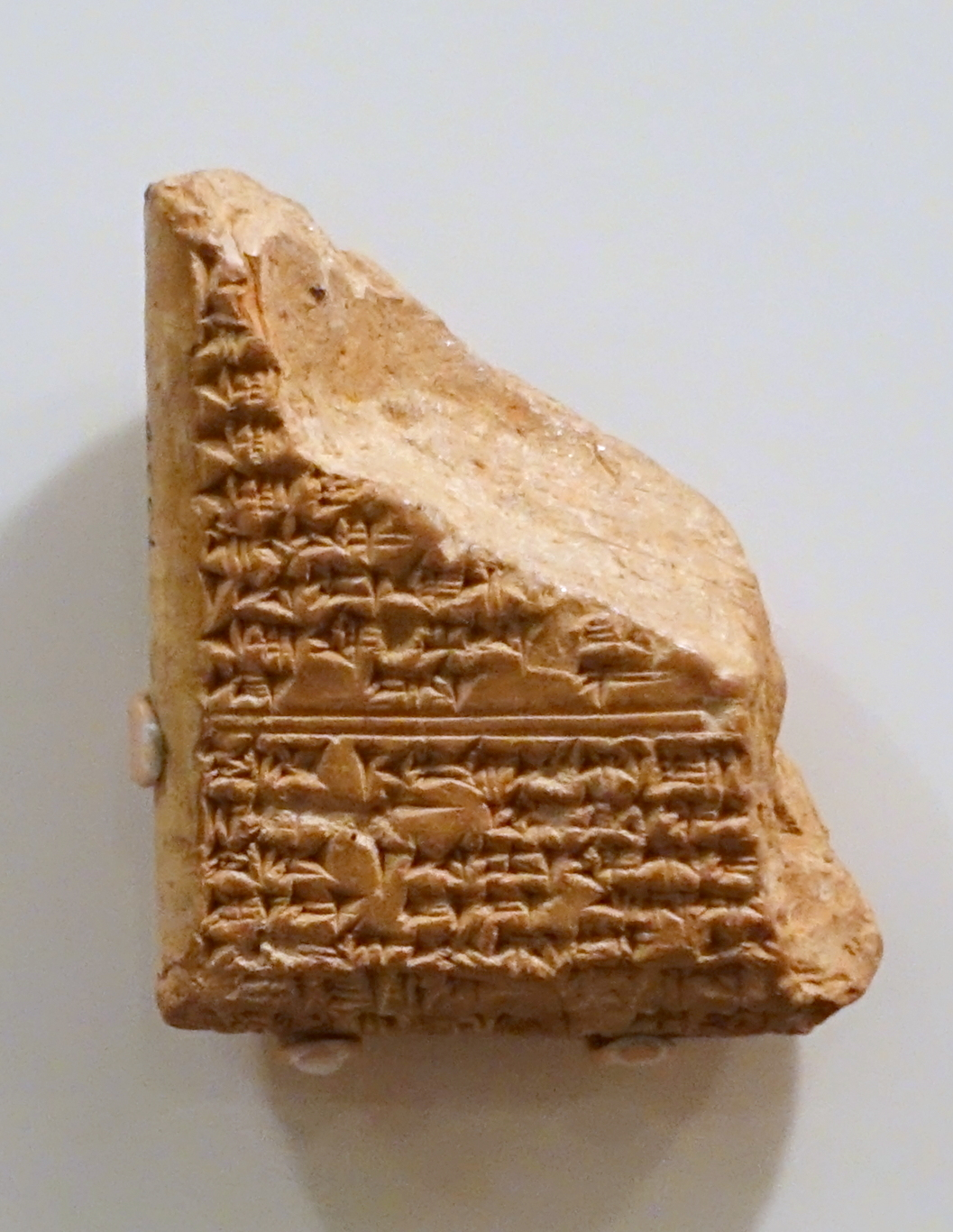
Amarna letter EA 26, fragment (Obverse). (high-resolution expandable photo)

Amarna letter EA 39, titled: "Duty-Free", is a fairly short letter from the King of Alashiya (modern Cyprus). Almost half the letter, Para I, is a shortened greeting formula. The letter is requesting the Pharaoh to let messengers pass freely, as they are also being represented as merchants; this also applies to their shipping.

The Amarna letters, about 300, numbered up to EA 382, are a mid 14th century BC, about 1350 BC and 20–25 years later, correspondence. The initial corpus of letters were found at Akhenaten's city Akhetaten, in the floor of the Bureau of Correspondence of Pharaoh; others were later found, adding to the body of letters.

== The letter ==
=== EA 39: "Duty-Free" ===
EA 39, letter number six of seven, from Alashiya. (Not a linear, line-by-line translation.)

Obverse (see here: )

(Lines 1-9)–Say to the king of Egypt, my [brother]er: Message of the king of Alašiya, your brother. For me all goes well, and for you may all go well. For your household, your chief wives, your sons^{1} your wives, your chariots, your many horses, and in Egypt-(Mizri), your country, may all go very well.

Paragraph II

(10-13)–My brother, let my messengers go promptly and safely so that I may hear my brother's greeting.

Paragraph III

(14-20)–these men are my merchants. My brother, let them go safely and prom[pt]ly. No one making a claim in your name is to approach my merchants of my ship.^{2}

Reverse (see here: )

–(uninscribed reverse, with a single line of written ink hieratic text)–(complete EA 39, minor lacunae, lines 1-20)

== See also ==
- Amarna letters–phrases and quotations
