= Pancyprian Public Servants' Trade Union =

PASY-DY
- Pancyprian Public Servants' Trade Union
- Παγκύπρια Συντεχνία Δημοσίων Υπαλλήλων (ΠΑ.ΣΥ.Δ.Υ.)
- Founded: 1927
- Headquarters: Nicosia, Cyprus
- Location: Cyprus
- Members: 15,000
- Key people: Glafkos Hadjipetrou, General Secretary
- Affiliations: PSI, EPSU
- Website: www.pasydy.org

The Pancyprian Public Servants' Trade Union (PASY-DY) is a trade union centre in Cyprus. It was founded in 1927 as the Cyprus Civil Service Association. It is affiliated with the Public Services International.
