= Ḫattušili III =

King of the Hittites c. 1275 – 1245 BCE

- Labarna
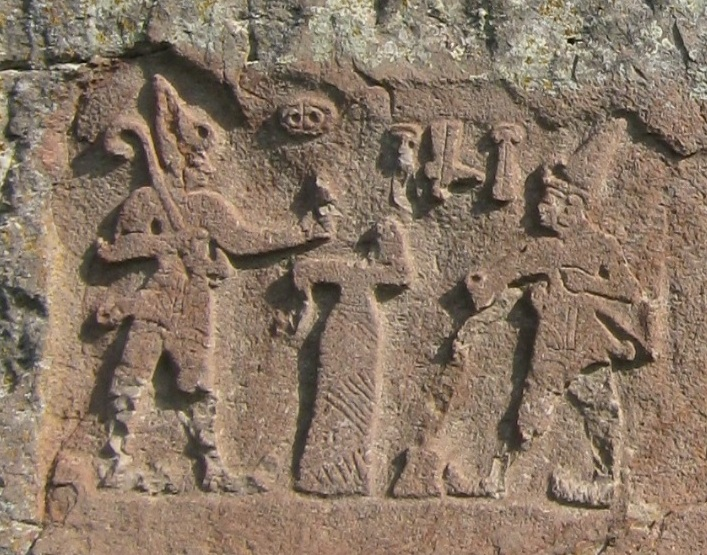
- Rock relief of Ḫattušili III

King of the Hittites
- Reign: 1275–1245 BC (middle); 1267-1237 BC (short)
- Predecessor: Mursili III
- Successor: Tudhaliya IV
- Consort: Puduhepa
- Issue: Nerikkaili; Tudhaliya IV; Maathorneferure; Kiluš-Ḫepa
- Father: Mursili II
- Mother: Gassulawiya
- Religion: Hittite religion
- Cartouche

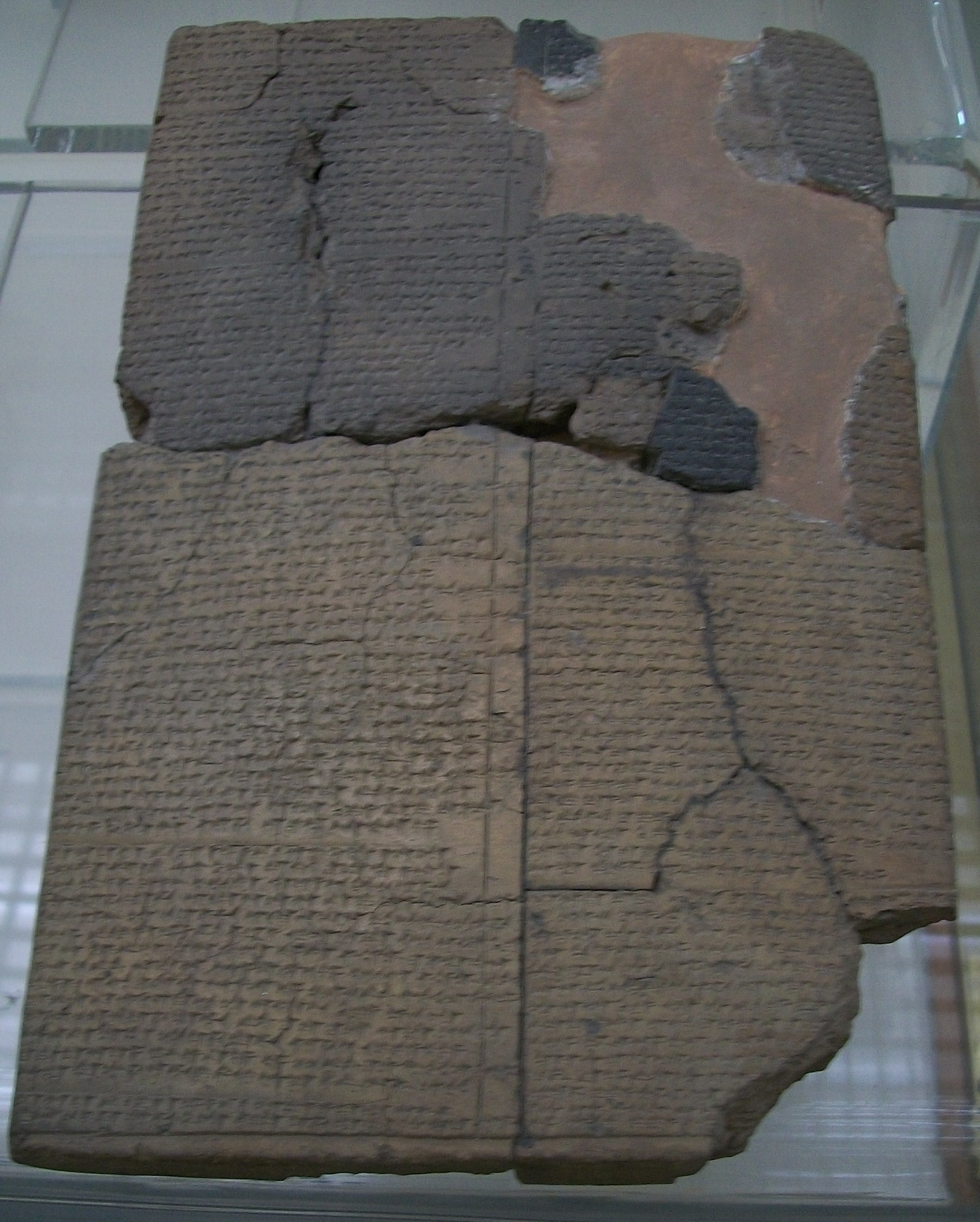
Apology of Hattusili III

Ḫattušili III (Hittite: "from Hattusa") was the labarna (king) of the Hittite empire (New Kingdom) c. 1275–1245 BC (middle chronology) or 1267–1237 BC (short chronology timeline).

== Early life and family ==
Much of what is known about the childhood of Hattusili III is gathered from a biographical account, written on a stone tablet during his reign, referred to as the Apology. Hattusili III was born the youngest of four children to the Hittite king Mursili II and queen Gassulawiya. According to Hattusili III himself, he was an ill and sickly child who was initially expected not to survive to adulthood. Hattusili III credited the goddess Ishtar with saving his life during this period, and would remain an ardent patron of Ishtar indefinitely. Due to his place as the youngest son, Hattusili III did not become king after the death of his father. Instead his older brother Muwattalli II ascended the throne.

Before becoming king, Hattusili III married Puduhepa, a priestess of Ishtar, who later became an important Hittite queen in her own right. With Puduhepa, Hattusili III had three children, including his successor Tudhaliya IV.

== Rise to kingship ==
Hattusili III was not destined to become king of the Hittites. He grew up as a sickly child during the reign of Mursili II. He served his brother Muwatalli II and his nephew Mursili III before rebelling and taking the throne.

=== Reign of Muwatalli II ===
Hattusili had an bitter feuding with another royal cadet branch over his appointment to be governor over the Upper Land. Though others think, when his brother Muwattalli II became king, Hattusili III was appointed to govern over the northern lands of the Hittite empire. While this initially caused minor controversy among the locals and the ousted governor, Hattusili III was quick to quash dissidence with military force and turned his eyes towards conquering new territories surrounding the northern Hittite lands. When the King made the decision to move the capital from Hattusa to Tarhuntassa, Hattusili III was left to quash the rebellions that arose due to this decision. Subsequently, Hattusili III was made King of the northern territories by his brother Muwattalli II.

=== Reign of Mursili III ===
Upon the death of Muwattalli II, Hattusili III's nephew Urhi-Teshub became the Great King of the Hittite Empire. There was controversy with this appointment, because Urhi-Teshub was the son of Muwattalli's concubine, not his wife. Despite his origins as a "second-rank son", Hattusili III initially supported Urhi-Teshub's kingship as it was the wish of Muwatalli II that Urhi-Teshub should rule. Urhi-Teshub ruled under the name Mursili III.

Shortly after his accession to the throne, Mursili III had the capital moved from Tarhuntassa back to its original home of Hattussa. This effectively reduced much of Hattusili's power in the region and nullified his role as king of the northern territories. Hattusili III was also stripped of all of his territories aside from Hapkis and Nerik. This strained the relationship greatly, and upon having Nerik stripped of him as well, Hattusili III sought to usurp the throne.

== Reign ==
=== Great King of Hatti ===
After deposing Mursili III as king, Hattusili III exiled him to Syria. Hattusili III appointed Muwattalli II's other son Kurunta, whom he himself had raised, to govern Tarhuntassa in a similar capacity that Hattusili III himself had once held.

As king, Hattusili III sought to keep a correspondence with many different kingships in the surrounding areas. After his ascension to the throne, Hattusili III began a correspondence with Egyptian Pharaoh Ramesses II that culminated in the first ever recorded peace treaty, the Eternal Treaty (also known as the Treaty of Kadesh). This correspondence took place roughly fifteen years after the Battle of Kadesh.

Hattusili's reign as king is notable for the large collection of letters and written accounts unearthed from this period. Over two-hundred letters were unearthed at the site of the royal palace in Hattusa. These primary sources, including The Apology, the Tawagalawa letter, and the Arzawa letters, are considered among the very few primary sources available from the Hittite empire of the time.

Hattusili's eldest son, Nerikkaili, was the heir apparent. However, Hattusili removed Nerikkaili from the succession in favor of his younger son, Tudhaliya.

== Hattusa Archive ==
He is known from a series of tablets.

- CTH 81 Apology of Ḫattušili III
- CTH 82 Annals of Ḫattušili III
- CTH 83 Report of Ḫattušili III on the campaigns of Šuppiluliuma I
- CTH 84 Report of the deeds of Šuppiluliuma I and Muršili II
- CTH 85 Conflict between Muršili III (Urḫi-Teššup) and Ḫattušili III
- CTH 86 Edict of Ḫattušili III concerning the estate of Arma-Tarḫunta
- CTH 87 Decree of Ḫattušili III in favor of the sons of Mittannamuwa
- CTH 88 Decree of Ḫattušili III regarding the exemption of the ḫekur of Pirwa from taxation
- CTH 89 Decree of Ḫattušili III concerning the people of Tiliura
- CTH 90 Edict of Ḫattušili III regarding the Restoration of Nerik
- CTH 91 Treaty of Ḫattušili III with Ramses II of Egypt
- CTH 92 Treaty of Ḫattušili III with Bentešina of Amurru
- CTH 93 Edict of Ḫattušili III concerning the merchants of Ura
- CTH 94 Edict of Ḫattušili III concerning the fugitives from Ugarit
- CTH 96 Declaration of Kurunta of Tarḫuntašša
- CTH 99 Historical report
- CTH 106 Treaties with the kings of Tarhuntassa
- CTH 155 Letter from Ramses II to Ḫattušili III about Urḫi-Teššup
- CTH 156 Letter from Ramses II to Ḫattušili III about Urḫi-Teššup
- CTH 157 Marriage letters from Ramses II to Ḫattušili III
- CTH 159 Marriage letters from Ramses II to Ḫattušili III and Puduḫepa
- CTH 161 Letter from Ramses II to Ḫattušili III
- CTH 162 Letters from Ramses II to Ḫattušili III and Puduḫepa
- CTH 163 Letters from Ramses II to Ḫattušili III
- CTH 168 Letter from the queen mother Tūya to Ḫattušili III
- CTH 169 Letter from prince Šutaḫapšap, son of Ramses II, to Ḫattušili III
- CTH 172 Letter from Ḫattušili III to Kadašman-Enlil II
- CTH 173 Letter from Ḫattušili III to Adad-nīrāri I
- CTH 174 Letter from Kadašman-Turgu to Ḫattušili III: Akkadian
- CTH 181 Letter from a Hittite king to the king of Aḫḫiyawa (Tawagalawa Letter)
- CTH 185 Letter of Ḫattušili III to Zuwa
- CTH 191 Letter from Manapa-Tarḫunta to the Hittite king
- CTH 193 Letter from Bentesina of Amurru to Ḫattušili III
- CTH 196 Letter from Lupakki to the king of Karkamiš
- CTH 223 unassigned
- CTH 224 Land donation of Ḫattušili III to Ura-Tarḫunta
- CTH 254 Military instructions of Ḫattušili III
- CTH 383 Prayer of Ḫattušili III and Puduḫepa to the Sun-goddess of Arinna

== Connections ==
- Hattusili III was the enemy general against Ramesses II at the Battle of Kadesh (Year 5 of Ramesses II).
- Hattusili III became allied when Ramesses II married his daughter (Year 34 of Ramesses II).

== See also ==
- History of the Hittites

Regnal titles
Preceded by Mursili III	Hittite king c. 1275–1245 BC	Succeeded by Tudhaliya IV
