= Club of great powers =

Late Bronze Age collection of empires in the Near East and Egypt

The Great Powers' Club or The Club of Great Powers is a term used by historians to refer to a collection of empires in the ancient Near East and Egypt between 1500 and 1100 BC, or the Late Bronze Age. These powers were Assyria, Babylon, the Egyptian Empire, the Hittite Empire, and the Mitanni, viz. the major powers in Mesopotamia, the Levant and Anatolia.

This period saw a systematic rise and fall of civilizations. Many civilizations went through the same cycle of creation, fluorescence, and fall of centralized states which include: the middle Elamite kingdom in western Iran, Kassite Babylonia in southern Mesopotamia, the Hittite new kingdom in Anatolia, and the new kingdom Egypt. While they did not all rise to the equal amount of power and influence at the same time, they did organize and participate in an international system of diplomacy, trade, and culture.

As states went through cycles of growth and expansion, usually one or two states were more powerful than the rest, and a political hierarchy was naturally formed, with each state knowing its respective place. As leaders rose to power in respective states throughout the regions and although they wanted to expand their empire and grow their power, they realized the immense benefits of diplomacy. A system of trade, not of the state's resources, but of the properties of the kings, was initiated.

== Items traded ==
States interacted through letters, written in Akkadian, the international language of diplomacy, and through oral messages. Marriages were a sure way to strengthen diplomatic ties and peace. One exception to this system was Egypt, which never gave royal women, but happily accepted the royal women of other states. Another commonly traded item was gifts. Each state had a specialty it could produce in its region. Egypt mined gold, Lebanon logged cedars, murex shells valued for their dye came from Northern Africa, Canaan specialized in jewelry, and Cyprus had its glass, beads of gold, faience, and agate.

== International relevance ==
During Hattusili's accession to power, he struggled to legitimate his rule over Hatti. With world powers shunning him for how he came to power. Thus it was important for him to gain said legitimacy, which efforts resulted in the Egyptian–Hittite peace treaty, where Egypt de-facto recognized his rule.

== Sources ==
One of the main primary sources we have of this Club of Great Powers comes from the Amarna letters in Egypt. King Akhenaten moved the capital of Egypt to Amarna and there kept the correspondence of him and his father with the rest of the members of the Club of Great Powers. A collection of 350 clay tablets was found there. The vast majority of the letters were written to Egypt's vassals in the Syria-Palestine region, and a minority are written to kings whom the Egyptians kings considered equal. They were the kings of Babylonia, Assyria, Mittani, Hatti, Alashiya (on Cyprus), and Arzawa (in south-west Anatolia). Collections of letters on clay tablets are also found throughout the Near East.
