= Alassa =

Alassa Άλασσα
- Village
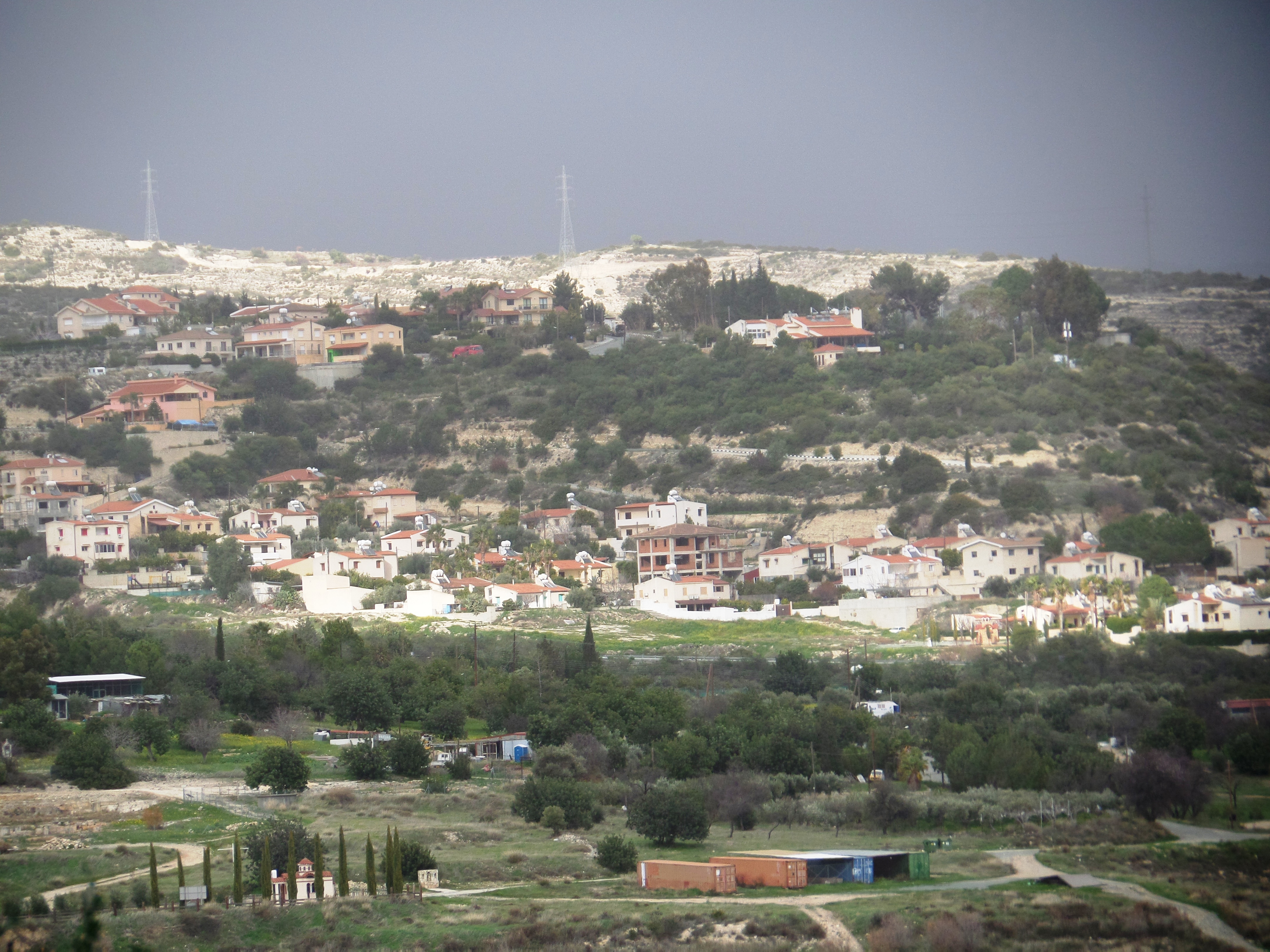

- Location in Cyprus
- Coordinates: 34°45′51″N 32°55′39″E
- Country: Cyprus
- District: Limassol District

Population (2001)
  - Total: 201
- Time zone: UTC+2 (EET)
  - Summer (DST): UTC+3 (EEST)

Alassa (Greek: Άλασσα) is a village in the Limassol District of Cyprus, north of the Kouris Dam, on the main road from Limassol to Kakopetria.

Excavations at Alassa by Cypriot archaeologists in the early 1980s unearthed the ruins of a Bronze Age city. Among other findings were the remains of a palace, suggesting that the site once had a much greater importance as a local trading center.

The site has been proposed as one candidate for the capital of Alashiya, a major kingdom mentioned as a member of the club of great powers in numerous Bronze Age texts. This identification was suggested on the basis of the similarity in names, but is supported by independent evidence including petrographic and chemical analyses of clay tablets sent by the king of Alashiya, which indicates that their clay came from southwestern Cyprus. Other candidates for the capital include Kalavasos.

Roman villas have also been found there, a mosaic floor depicting Aphrodite and Eros from one of which is in the Limassol museum.

Alassa has been developed in modern times as a park-like tourist centre.

== Alassa Paliotaverna ==
The archaeological site Alassa-Paliotaverna (also spelled Alassa-Palaiotaverna) is located in the upper quarters of a settlement situated on a plateau right above the Kouris River in south-western Cyprus. It was built during approximately 1340-1100 BCE, the highest Late Bronze Age settlement on the island, considering its mountainous location at the foothills of the Troodos Mountains.

=== Building II ===
Building II at Alassa Paliotaverna, dated to the Late Bronze Age, is a monumental ashlar structure and the largest elite building known from the Kouris River valley. Located north of a 4.30-meter-wide street opposite Building I, its architecture combines Near Eastern and Aegean techniques, making it unique on Cyprus.

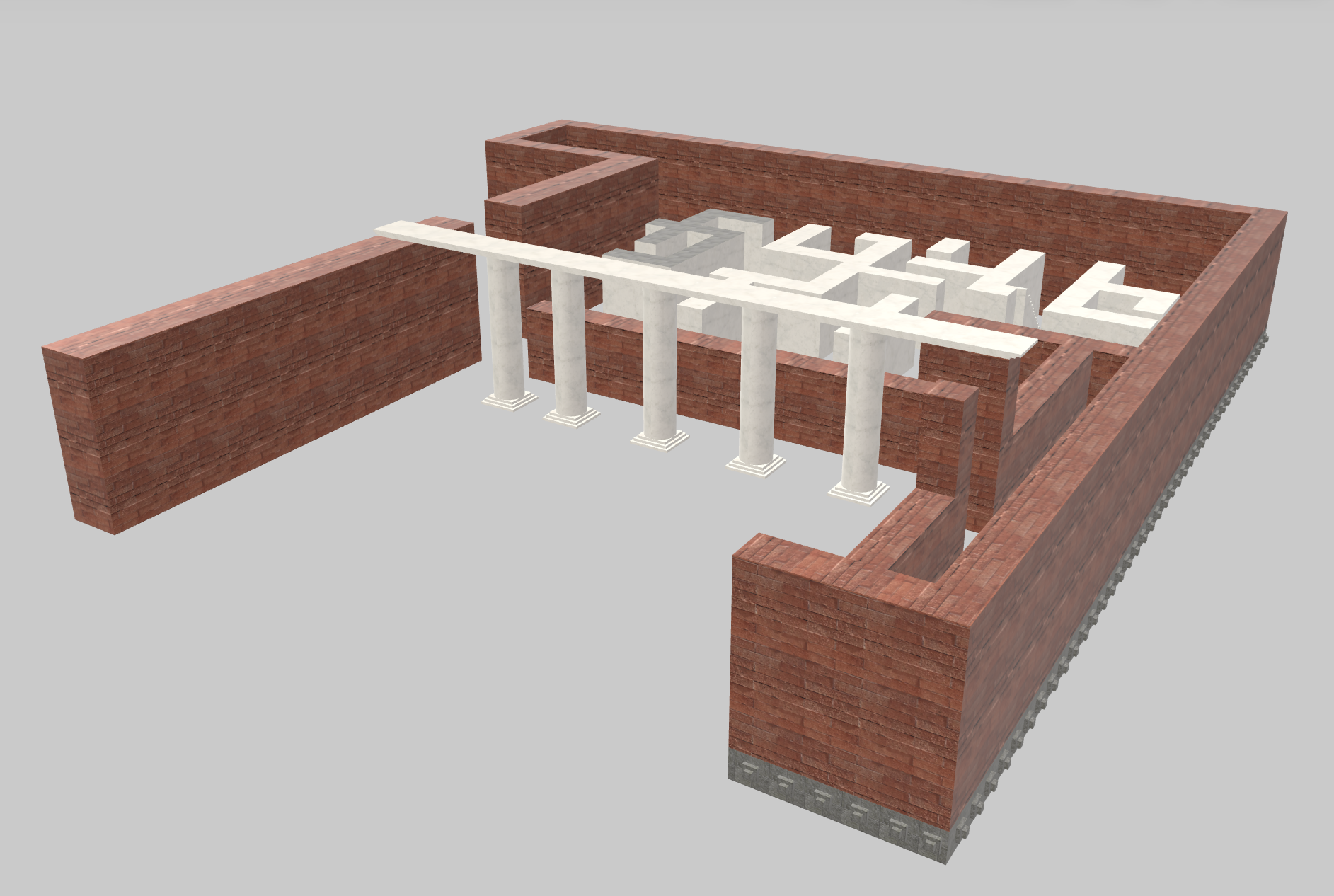
A 3D model of the north and west wings of Building II at Alassa Paliotaverna, depicting the central courtyard with a portico on the inner eastern wall.

Constructed using ashlar masonry, a technique that uses uniform, rectangular stone blocks, the building has influences of Aegean architecture, which reflects the Late Bronze Age as a time of significant Aegean migration to Cyprus. Considering this migration and influence, it has been argued that Building II was built by a mix of Aegean migrants who had assimilated into the local Cypriot population and Cypriots. The monumental nature of Building II also suggests that it was built by elites, erected to become “indelible landmarks” and “primary arenas in which Late Cypriot sociopolitical dynamics were enacted.”

Building II is a large “Π”-shaped building with an area of 1410m², a square with distinct wings arranged around a large central courtyard which suggests a communal character. A portico ran along the structure’s inner eastern wall, functioning as the main facade of the two-storey structure; two ashlar blocks found served as column bases while one was robbed, and two others remain missing.

The building served the purpose of storage as well, with “at least 16 large storage pithoi” found in the north wing. The elite identity of its inhabitants is expressed by the pithoi found, as some had clay bands “impressed with scenes of hunting/ combat or sitting griffons.” The north and west wings are also relatively higher in elevation when compared to the south wing.

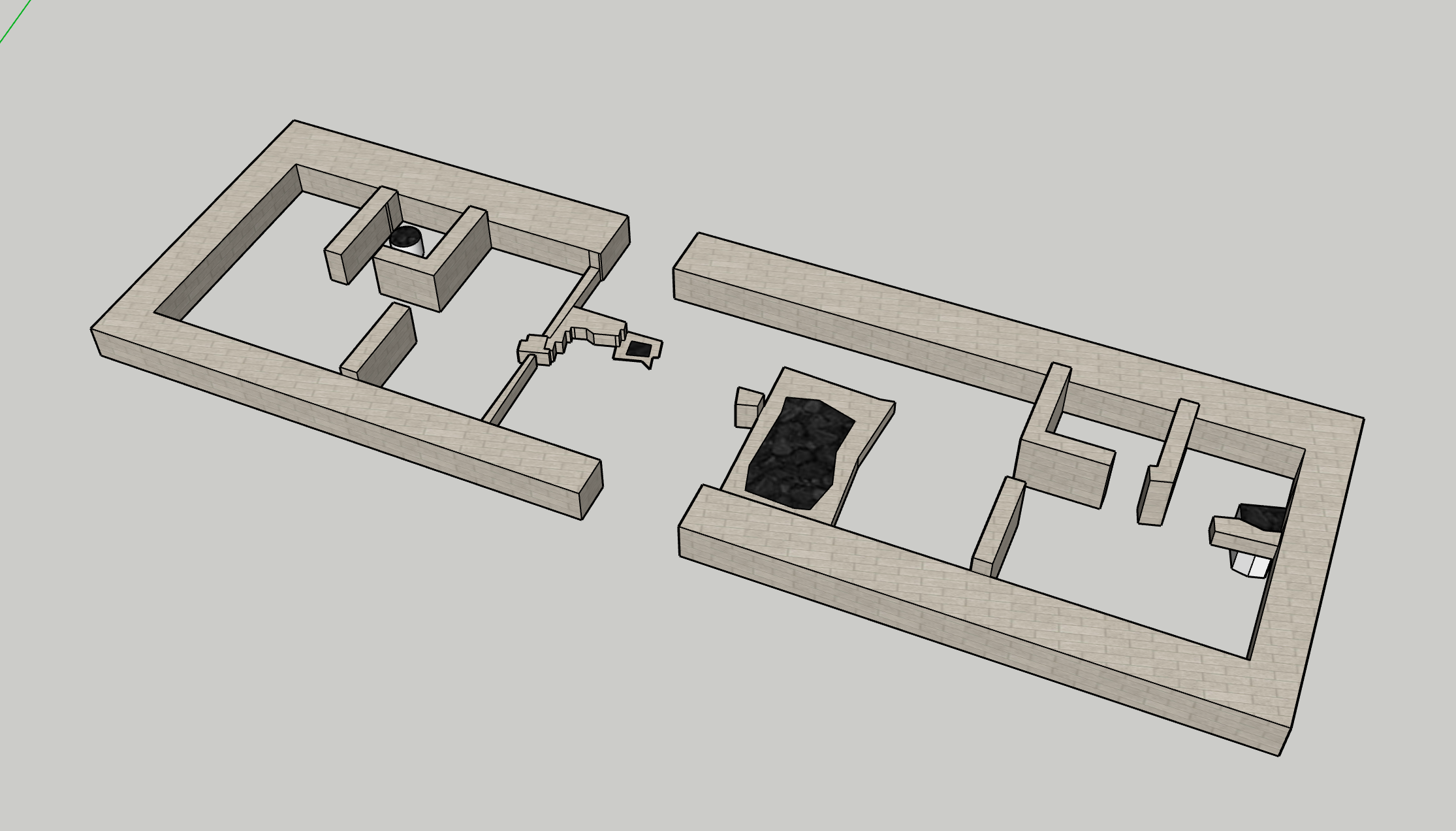
A 3D model of the southern part of Building II at Alassa Paliotaverna

The southern part of Building II comprises the South Wing, a clearly organized space featuring a central “Hearth Room” flanked by symmetrical residential units to the east and west. Notable elements include a stylobate with a reused pillar base used as a hearth, a subterranean “Sunken Construction” (possibly for storage or liquids), and evidence of sanitary installations in the East Unit. The wing was originally accessed via three doorways aligned with those of Building I, though the lateral entrances were later blocked.

The sophisticated design, including drafted-margin ashlars and a planned drainage system, highlights its public or ceremonial significance and reflects a high degree of architectural planning in LBA Cyprus.

=== Building III ===
Building III of Alassa Paliotaverna is a smaller (ca. 25 × 16 m) three-room building which likely served as a wine production and storage annex to Building II, which it was 20m east of. The ground plan of the building is trapezoidal with its sides tapering northwards, the south wall is 26 m long and the north 22 m. The building techniques employed for Building III are the same as the Ashlar buildings I and II but not as fine as its counterparts. The fill of its shell walls contains red mud bricks used in Building II as well, however it is interesting to note that the red mud used in both buildings is not in close proximity of the site. On the northern part of Building III, a large pithos was found entirely sunk in a rock-cut pit. The pithos is nearly two meters deep with its interior stained with a brownish-red colour, most probably the organic residue of wine. The arrangement of the rooms heavily suggests the existence of a wine press and the building being used for wine production, with the presence of a stone counterweight echoes this sentiment.

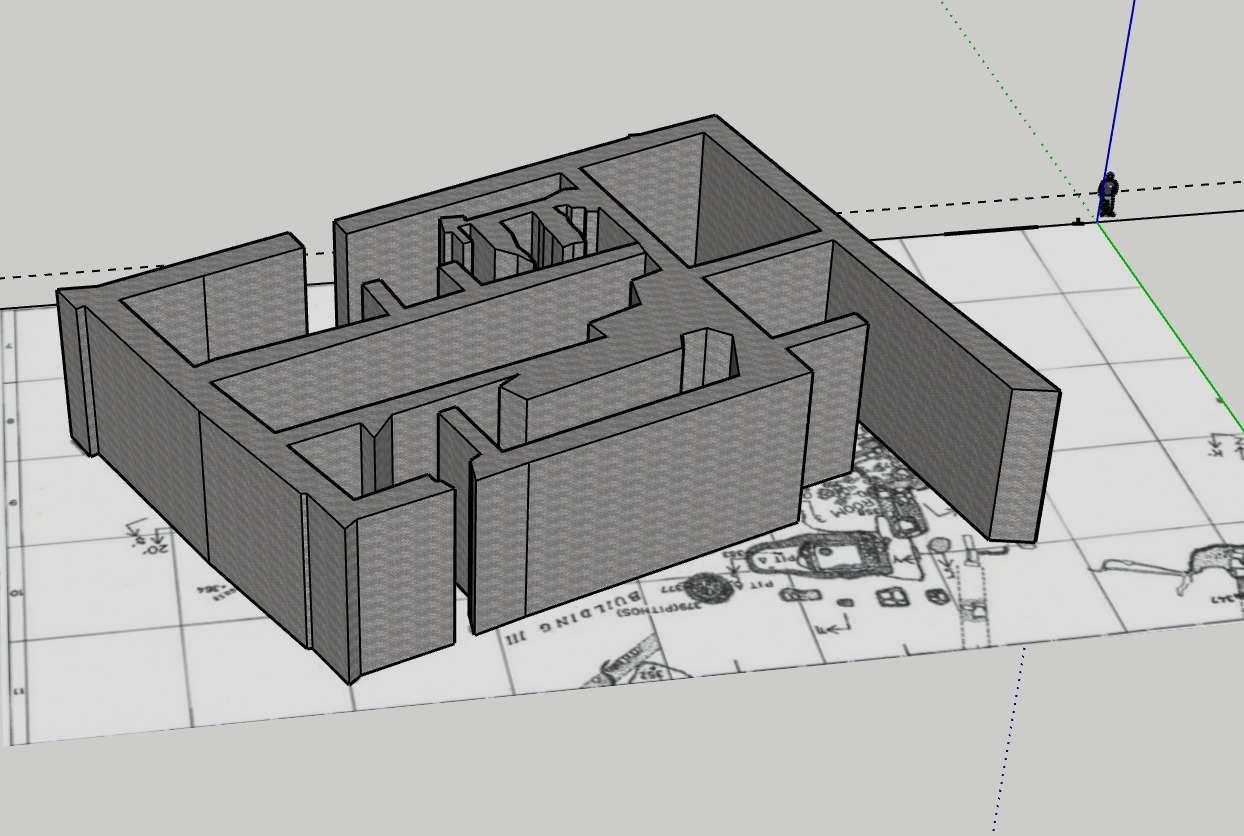
3D model of Building III at Alassa Paliotaverna

The broader significance of this is that it shows another form of legitimacy of the Bronze Age elite administrative class has to control the area since this wine press is in the more exclusive Alassa-Paliotaverna region of the site, which is separated from the densely populated industrial and domestic quarters of Alassa-Pano Mantilaris. This strongly suggests that the administrative elites live in Alassa-Paliotaverna, further reinforced by the more sophisticated constructed buildings with ashlar masonry used. This control over another important trade, like wine, shows the elites not only control the main copper trade of Alassa, but also other lucrative trades such as wine production to further extend their control of Alassa’s population.
