= Alashiya =

Bronze Age polity of the Eastern Mediterranean

Map of the Ancient Near East around 1400 BC

Alashiya (Akkadian: 𒀀𒆷𒅆𒅀 Alašiya [a-la-ši-ia]; Ugaritic: 𐎀𐎍𐎘𐎊 ẢLṮY; Linear B: 𐀀𐀨𐀯𐀍 Alasios [a-ra-si-jo]; Hieratic "'irs3"), also spelled Alasiya and known as the Kingdom of Alashiya, was a polity of Cyprus during the Middle and Late Bronze Ages. Alashiya was a major source of copper for states in the Ancient Near East, including Egypt.

== History ==
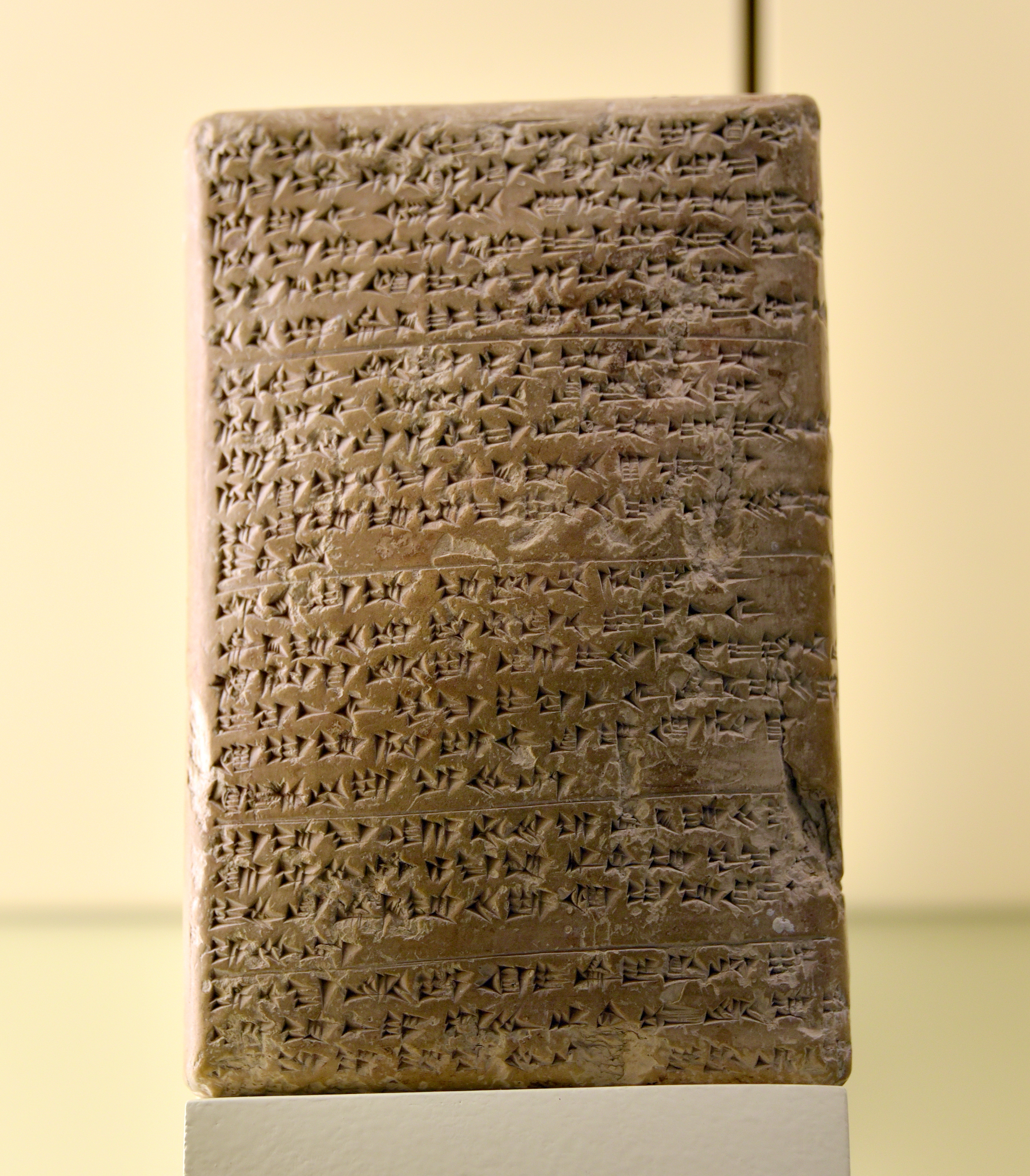
One of the Amarna letters. Correspondence between a king of Alashiya and Amenhotep III of Egypt. Circa 1380 BC. From Tell el-Amarna, Egypt. Vorderasiatisches Museum, Berlin

The name Alashiya is found on texts written in Egyptian, Hittite, Akkadian, Mycenean (Linear B) and Ugaritic. The name may be the origin of the later Biblical term Elishah.

=== Hittites ===
Around 1400 BC, the Hittite king Arnuwanda I chastised his vassal Madduwatta for raiding Alashiya, asserting that it was Hittite territory. Madduwatta replied that he had been unaware of the Hittite claim:

The father of his Majesty [had never informed] me, [nor] had his Majesty ever informed [me] (thus): ʻThe land of Alasiya is mine— recognize it as such!ʼ

Although Madduwatta's statement can be interpreted as prevarication, no surviving texts from this period refer to Hittite involvement in Alashiya, and the empire's military situation would have made direct control unlikely. The political reality behind this Madduwatta's statement thus remains unclear.

Around 1200 BC—preceding the Late Bronze Age collapse in the Eastern Mediterranean—the Hittite kings Tudḫaliya IV and Šuppiluliuma II waged military campaigns in Alashiya and forced its king to sign a treaty of submission.

=== Egypt ===
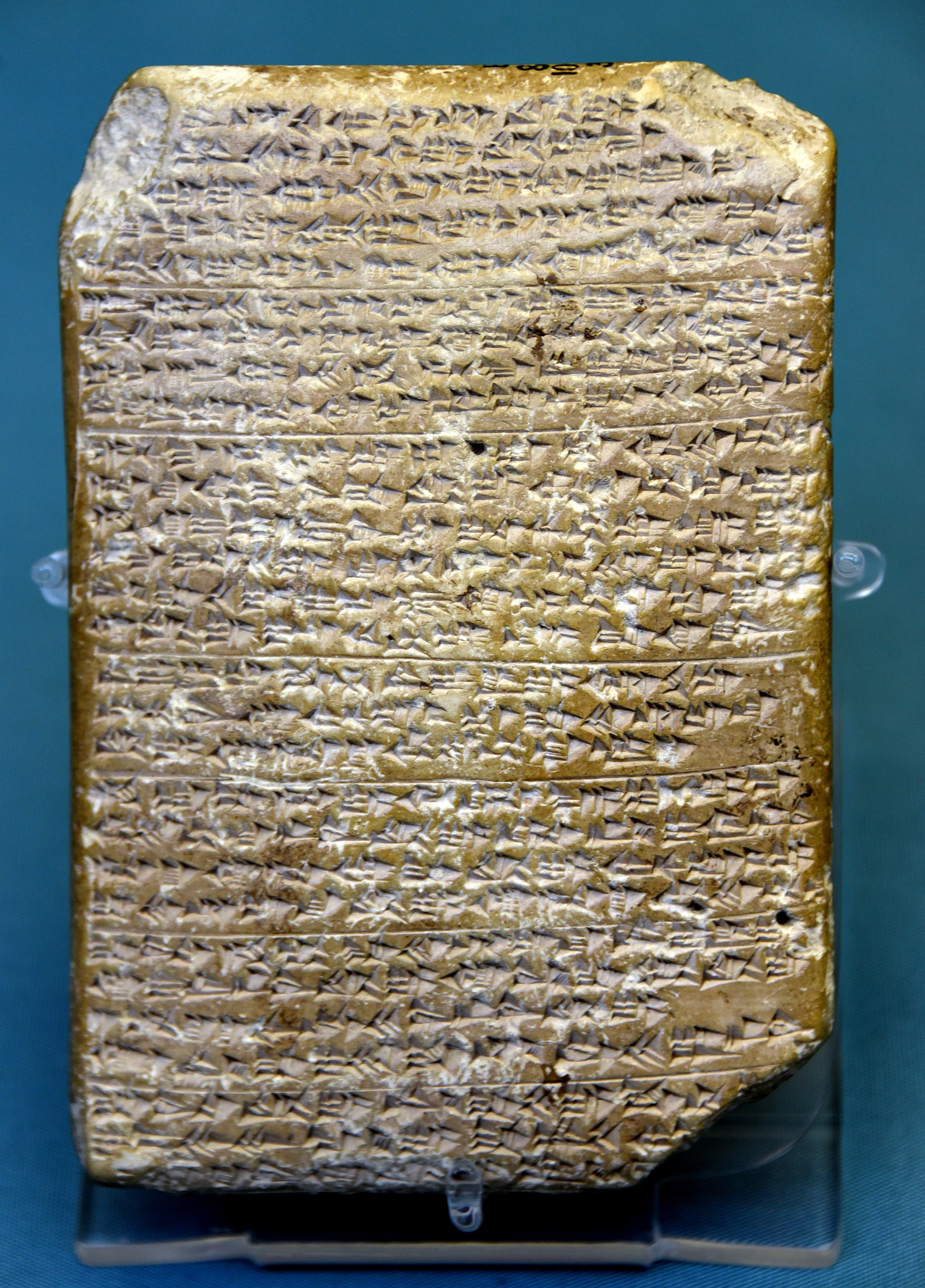
Amarna letter. "Message from the king of Alashiya, your brother" to the Pharaoh of Egypt, possibly Akhenaten. Circa 1350 BC. From Tell el-Amarna, Egypt. British Museum

The Amarna letters (c. 1350 BC) include communications with the king of Alashiya. These mainly concern copper from Alashiya and requests for silver or ivory in return. One letter refers to 500 talents of copper (probably about 12.5 tons) and makes excuses as to why so little copper has been sent. The Pharaoh is also referred to by the King of Alashiya as his "brother", indicating that the king regarded himself as an equal, probably because of the economic power of his kingdom. Papyrus Anastasi IV, written several centuries later, also refers to copper (as well as cows) sent from Alashiya to Egypt.

The ending of the Story of Wenamun records how Wenamun, a priest of Egypt, had been blown off course on the sea journey from Byblos to Egypt and lands on Alashiya. Wenamun reports that he was almost killed by an angry mob but was rescued by Hatbi, the "princess of the town".

==== List of Amarna letters from Alashiya ====
- EA 33; Title: An Alliance in the Making
- EA 34; Title: The Pharaoh's reproach answered
- EA 35; Title: The hand of Nergal
- EA 36; Title: More about copper
- EA 37; Title: More about silver
- EA 38; Title: A brotherly quarrel
- EA 39; Title: Duty-Free
- EA 40; Title: Duty-Free, Governor to Governor

=== Ugarit ===
In other correspondence, the King of Ugarit pleads for military assistance from the King of Alashiya. Another document from Ugarit records the banishment of two princes to "the land of Alashiya". An Ugaritic text provides a potential clue regarding Alashiya's capital, as one passage may describe it as mountainous, though alternative readings translate the term as "shore." The first recorded name of a Cypriot king is Kushmeshusha, on letters sent to Ugarit in the 13th century BC.

== Identification ==
Scholarship strongly indicates that Alashiya was on Cyprus. Whether it encompassed the entire island or represented a regional kingdom is a subject of debate. Also unresolved is a location of a capital or administrative center; candidates include Enkomi and Kalavasos.

Textual sources confirm that Alashiya was a primary supplier of copper throughout the Eastern Mediterranean, and that it shipped the metal along established sea routes. Sources also record its cultural and military connections to Southwestern Anatolian groups such as the Lukka.

Petrographic and chemical analyses trace the Alashiyan Amarna letters to clay from the Troodos Mountains of Cyprus and indicate Kalavasos-Agios Dimitrios and Alassa as likely origins.

== Sources ==
- Beal, Richard (2011). "Hittite Anatolia: A Political History". In Steadman, Sharon; McMahon, Gregory (eds.). The Oxford Handbook of Ancient Anatolia. Oxford University Press. doi:10.1093/oxfordhb/9780195376142.013.0026.
- Beckman, Gary; Bryce, Trevor; Cline, Eric (2012). The Ahhiyawa Texts. Brill. p. 99. ISBN 978-1589832688.
- Boardman, John, ed. (1982). The Cambridge Ancient History: The Expansion of the Greek World, Eighth to Sixth Centuries B.C. Vol. 3. Cambridge University Press. ISBN 0-521-23447-6.
- Eric H. Cline (22 September 2015). 1177 B.C.: The Year Civilization Collapsed. Princeton University Press. ISBN 978-1-4008-7449-1.
- Goren, Yuval; Bunimovitz, Shlomo; Finkelstein, Israel; Na'aman, Nadav (2003). "The Location of Alashiya: New Evidence from Petrographic Investigation of Alashiyan Tablets from El-Amarna and Ugarit". American Journal of Archaeology. 107 (2): 233–255.
- Gard Granerød (26 March 2010). Abraham and Melchizedek: Scribal Activity of Second Temple Times in Genesis 14 and Psalm 110. Walter de Gruyter. p. 116. ISBN 978-3-11-022346-0.
- Knapp, A. Bernard (1985). "Alashiya, Caphtor/Keftiu, and Eastern Mediterranean Trade: Recent Studies in Cypriote Archaeology and History". Journal of Field Archaeology. 12 (2): 231–250. doi:10.1179/009346985791838686.
- Knapp, A. Bernard, ed. (1996). Near Eastern and Aegean Texts from the Third to the First Millennia BC. Greek, Roman, and Byzantine Studies. ISBN 0-9651704-2-X.
- Knapp, A. Bernard (1997). The Archaeology of Late Bronze Age Cypriot Society: The Study of Settlement, Survey and Landscape. Department of Archaeology, University of Glasgow. ISBN 0-85261-573-6.
