= Hittite Wars of Survival =

Wars and invasions, c. 1400 – 1350 BC

Invasions of Hatti
- Part of the Kaskian-Hittite Wars
- Hatti before the invasions
Date	c. 1400–1350 BC (short chronology)
Location	New Kingdom Hatti
Result	Hittite victory: The Hittites reasserts their authority on the international stage; Transition to Hittite New Kingdom
Territorial changes	Hatti initially lost much of its Heartlands territory, being reduced to area around Šamuḫa. Šamuḫa subsequently became the capital city of the Kingdom.; After the re-conquests, Hatti retook its lost lands.

Belligerents
Hittite Empire	Kaška; Arzawa; Hayasa-Azzi; Išuwa

Commanders and leaders
Arnuwanda I Tudḫaliya III; Šuppiluliuma I	Piyapili (Kaska); Karanni (Hayasa-Azzi); Tarḫuntaradu (Arzawa)

Casualties and losses
Much of the lands of Hatti ravaged and in ruins.	Many taken as war captives to Hatti.

The Wars of Survival were a series of wars between the Hittite Empire and its neighbours including Arzawa, Kaška, and Hayasa-Azzi. The wars, which lasted from c. 1400 BC to 1350 BC proved to be an existential period for the Hittites, whose capital city of Ḫattuša was sacked and whose territory was reduced to a small area around Šamuḫa. However, the Hittite general and future king Šuppiluliuma regained all of their lost territory and embarked on punitive expeditions which firmly reestablished the Hittites as a major power.

== Background ==
During the reign of Arnuwanda I, the Hittites had been unable to firmly control Western Anatolia. This is evidenced by a document known to modern scholars as the Indictment of Madduwatta, which recounts the repeated betrayals of a nominally pro-Hittite vassal ruler. Despite having sworn fealty to the Hittites, Madduwatta repeatedly stirred up trouble with neighbouring kingdoms including Arzawa, requiring the Hittites to commit troops to the region. Richard H. Beal mentions that Tudhaliya and Mariya of Hayasa-Azzi had signed a treaty, when Mariya arrived in the Hittite land to pay tribute, Tudhaliya had Mariya executed for having flirted with some of Tudhaliya's palace women.

== War ==
This war would be long, however the exact length is unknown, it is usually dated from sometime during Arnuwanda's reign to early Suppiluliuma's reign.

=== Early phase ===
During the reign of Arnuwanda I, the Kaška had raided, seized, and sacked many Hittite holy cities including Tapikka, Šarišša and Šapinuwa, with the Kaška being some 100 km from the capital city of Ḫattuša. Arnuwanda saw some limited success in pushing them out, even trying to diplomatically pay the Kaška off, but much of Ḫatti still remained under Kaška control. In this era, the Hittite Kingdom was a fragile structure lacking the resources and manpower to respond effectively to such events.

=== Concentric invasions ===
Around the time Tudḫaliya III took the throne, the situation deteriorated further. Multiple neighbouring groups attacked the Hittites, in what has come to be known as the "concentric invasions". Later Hittite texts portray these attacks as a sudden and coordinated conspiracy, modern Hittitologists suspect that this level of coordination would have been impossible for geographically separated and often illiterate groups.

These new attackers included the Hittites' western rival Arzawa, who conquered an enormous swath of Hittite territory including lands that it had never lost since its founding two centuries earlier. make things even worse, Isuwa attacked and sacked Kizzuwatna.

These attacks were very successful, and the Hittite heartland was overrun. The Hittite capital city of Ḫattuša was either sacked or abandoned, and the royals retreated to the city of Šamuḫa, which became a temporary capital and a base from which to mount counterattacks. The Hittite Kingdom came to the brink of a complete collapse. However, before the capital moved to Samuha it had moved to Šapinuwa, from where Tudhsliya mounted a failed fightback before eventually moving it to Samuha. In addition the holy city of Nerik too fell to the Kaška. In treaties between the Kaskians and Hittites, the Kaskians are told not to pasture their Sheep on Hittite lands and were restricted to trade only in certain Hittite cities. Their relations had been tense before the invasions already.

During this time, the Egyptian pharaoh Amenhotep III wrote to the Arzawan Tarḫuntaradu intending to open diplomatic relations. The exchange was complicated by the fact that the Arzawans did not have access to a scribe who could read or write Akkadian, the diplomatic language among the great powers of the time. However, the correspondence was completed in Hittite, a language which the Arzawan royals were familiar with, and which the Egyptian scribes were able to approximate despite some grammatical errors. Two letters from this correspondence survive as part of the Amarna letters found in Egypt. In one of the letters, Amenhotep remarks that 'I have heard that everything is finished, and the country of Ḫattuša is paralyzed'.

=== Reconquests ===
From his base at Šamuḫa, Tudḫaliya launched a campaign to retake all the lost lands. This ended up taking twenty years and was only completed by his successor Šuppiluliuma I.

The first targets of the reconquest were the territories taken by the Kaška to the north and Hayasa-Azzi to the northeast, probably because they were the closest to Šamuḫa. The Kaška in particular were attacked multiple times during this phase. With Hayasa-Azzi had a showdown at Kumaha, that occurred after the defeat of Kaška by Ḫatti. After this showdown Hayasa-Azzi were forced to sign a vassal treaty with the Hittites.

Following those reconquests, the Hittites turned to Arzawa. Tudḫaliya was growing increasingly ill at this time and allowed Šuppiluliuma to take the lead of the campaign. Arzawa proved to be a difficult nut to crack and it is believed that the campaign took longer than the ones against Kaška and Hayasa-Azzi, however Arzawa was eventually defeated. The Hittites under Šuppiluliuma started by retaking taking the fort of Sallapare, Tuwanuwa, and Tarḫuntašša. Though towards the end in 1350's BC, Anzapahhadu of Arzawa routed a Hittite general named Himuili, while finally succumbing to another incursion led by Šuppiluliuma himself. Thus Anzapahhadu eventually got subdued by the Hittites.

=== Result ===
These wars saw much of the Hittite lands and cities ravaged, with Hittite grain-lands suffering particularly. However, these lands were eventually refortified and repopulated.

When Tudḫaliya III died, the throne was intended to pass to the crown prince Tudḫaliya the Younger. However, Šuppiluliuma felt discontented at being passed over, given his role in reconquering the kingdom. Šuppiluliuma assassinated the crown prince with the support of the army, taking the throne for himself.

== Aftermath ==
Ḫatti would emerge stronger than ever after these wars and after it had had the chance to recover from the damage the war caused. Suppiluliuma would go on to become one of the greatest military leaders of the Empire.

Another result would be the freeing up of Hittite resources for Suppiluliuma's Syrian Campaign.
