= Hittite sites =

Sites of the Hittite Empire

The Hittite Empire at its greatest extent under Suppiluliuma I (c.1350–1322 BC) and Mursili II (c.1321–1295 BC) showing cities and towns.

The geography of the Hittite Empire is inferred from Hittite texts on the one hand, and from archaeological excavation on the other. Matching philology to archaeology is a difficult and ongoing task, and so far, only a handful of sites are identified with their ancient name with certainty.

The Hittite kingdom was centered on the lands surrounding Hattusa and Neša, known as "the land of the Hatti" (^{URU}Ha-at-ti). After Hattusa was made the Hittite capital, the area encompassed by the bend of the Halys River (which they called the Marassantiya) was considered the core of the empire, and some Hittite laws make a distinction between "this side of the river" and "that side of the river". For example, the reward for the capture of a runaway slave after he managed to flee beyond the Halys is higher than that for a slave caught before he could reach the river.

To the south of the core territory was the land of Kizzuwatna in the area of the Taurus Mountains. To the west, the confederacies of Arzawa and Assuwa, the second of which in particular may not have indicated a contiguous geographic area. To the north, the mountain people of the "Kaskians". To the east, the Mitanni. After the incorporation or association of Arzawa and Mitanni (under Suppiluliuma I), the Hittite sphere of influence under Mursili II bordered on the "Hayasa-Azzi" to the east, on the "Ahhiyawa" and the newly forming Assuwa league to the west, on Egypt-controlled Canaan to the south, and on Assyria to the south-east.

== List of Hittite sites ==
- Acem Hüyük
- Tell Açana
- Adana
- Tell Ahmar
- Akar Çay
- Aksu Çayı
- Alaca Höyük
- Aleppo
- Alishar Hüyük
- Amasya
- Andaval
- Antakya
- Antalya
- Arslantepe-Malatya
- Asarcık
- Bahçe
- Bakır Çey
- Bergama
- Beycesultan
- Beyköy
- Beyşehir Gölü
- Birecik
- Bobeypınarı
- Bodrum
- Boğazkale: Hattusa
- Bolkarmaden
- Bolu
- Bor
- Bursa
- Büyükmenderes Nehir
- Büyüknefes
- Çağdın
- Çalapverdi
- Çankırı in Paphlagonia
- Çekerek
- Ceyhan Nehir
- Çorum
- Darende
- Dazmana
- Delice Su
- Demirci-deresi
- Devrez Çayı
- Didim
- Divriği
- Efes
- Eflatun Pınar
- Eğirdir Gölü
- Eğrek
- Eğriköy
- Elbistan
- Emirgazi
- Ereğli
- Erkilet
- Ermenek
- Eskişehir
- Eskiyapar
- Tell al-Fakhariyeh
- Fasiler
- Fraktin
- Gâvur Kalesi
- Gaziantep
- Gediz Nehir
- Gilindere
- Giresun
- Gök Irmak
- Gök Su
- Gülnar
- Gürün
- Hama
- Hanyeri
- Hatip
- Havuzköy
- Hisarlık: Wilusa
- Hüseyindede Tepe
- Ilgaz Dağı
- Imamkulu
- İnandık
- Iskendenru
- Islâhiye
- Ispekçür
- Ivriz
- Izgın
- İzmir
- İzmit
- İznik
- Jekke
- Jerablus
- Jubayl
- Karabel
- Karaburçlu
- Karaburna
- Karahüyük by Elbistan
- Karahüyük by Konya
- Karakuyu
- Karaman
- Karatepe
- Karga
- Kaş
- Kayalıpınar
- Kayseri
- Tell Kazel
- Kelkit Çay
- Kemah
- Kilise Tepe
- Kinet Hüyük
- Kızıl Irmak
- Kızıldağ
- Konya: Tarhuntassa?
- Korucutepe
- Kötükale
- Köylütolu
- Küçükmenderes Nehir
- Kültepe: Kaneš
- Kürtoğlu
- Kurubel
- Kuşaklı: Sarissa
- Lésvos
- Mahalıç
- Malkaya
- Manisa
- Mar'aş
- Maşat Hüyük
- Menderes Çayı
- Mersin
- Meskene
- Milet
- el-Mishrifeh
- Mitlini
- Mut
- Niğde
- Nur Dağları
- Ortaköy, Çorum: Sapinuwa
- Palanga
- Porsuk Çay
- Pozantı
- Qalat el-Mudiq
- Ras Shamra
- Restan
- Saida
- Sakarya Nehir
- Sakçagözü
- Samsat: Samosata
- Samsun
- Şar
- Sart
- Şebin Karahısar
- Selgin
- Seyhan Nehir
- Silifke
- Sinop
- Sipylus
- Sirkeli
- Sivas
- Sivasa
- Sivrihisar
- Sultanhanı
- Tell Tainat
- Tarsus
- Tasçın
- Tekir
- Tell Nebi Mend
- Topada
- Torbalı
- Turhal
- Tuz Gölü
- Tyre
- Uşaklı Höyük
- Yağri
- Yazılıkaya
- Zile
- Zincirli
