= Sirkeli =

Sirkeli may refer to the following places in Turkey:

- Sirkeli, Ceyhan, village in village in the district of Ceyhan, Adana Province
  - Sirkeli Höyük, tell located in the above village
- Sirkeli, Çubuk, village in the district of Çubuk, Ankara Province
