= Wurunkatte =

Hattian and Hittite war god

- War god
- Major cult center: Hattusa
- Weapon: mace
- Animals: lion

Equivalents
- Mesopotamian: Zababa

Wurunkatte or Wurukatte was a Hittite war god of Hattian origin. He might have also been connected to the institution of kingship. His symbol was a mace, and based on textual sources it is presumed he could be depicted standing on the back of a lion. Inhe appears in association with deities such as Šulinkatte, Taru and Telipinu. He was worshiped in Hattusa, Nerik, Tuḫumijara and Tarammeka.

== Name and character ==
Wurunkatte's name has Hattic origin and can be translated as "king of the land". Volkert Haas noted it can be compared to the Akkadian epithet šār mātim, used to refer to Dagan.

Wurunkatte was regarded as a war god. He shared this role with many other deities in the Hittite pantheon, for example Iyarri or originally Hurrian Ḫešui. In art, he was depicted standing on the back of a lion. A description of a silver statuette presumed to represent him states that he held a shield and a mace in his hands; the latter weapon is also attested as his symbol in other texts.

According to Piotr Taracha, in Hattian tradition, Wurunkatte was also associated with the ideology of kingship, similarly to the deified throne Ḫanwašuit (called Ḫalmašuit in Hittite). He could be referred to with the title tabarna, in other contexts used to designate the reigning king of the land of Hatti. Taracha suggests that both his presumed role as a kingship deity and the meaning of his name might indicate that he had a special position in the Hattian pantheon prior to the rise of weather gods in the nineteenth and eighteenth centuries BCE, a phenomenon attested in sources from Hattusa and Kanesh.

== Associations with other deities ==
Comparisons have been drawn between the character and iconography of Wurunkatte and another god of Hattian origin, Šulinkatte. A single Hattic text pairs them with each other and states that "Šulinkatte is the son of Hattusa, Wurunkatte is the son of warta (meaning unknown) and of the lands." In a number of texts, Wurunkatte instead forms a pair with the Hattian deity Tunturmiša. A group consisting of him, Taru and Telipinu is also attested. In incantations, he could be associated with the Hattian goddess of magic, Kataḫziwuri. A deity named Wurukattainu, "small/young Wurunkatte" or "child of Wurunkatte", is also attested.

Wurunkatte was considered the counterpart of the Mesopotamian god Zababa by the Hittites. His own name could be rendered logographically using that belonging to the latter deity. However, as he was not the only god who could be designated by this Akkadogram in Hittite texts, the identity of the deity meant when phonetic spellings are not used is not always clear.

== Worship ==
In Hattusa Wurunkatte received offerings during the KI.LAM festival. His inclusion in these celebrations most likely reflected his importance in the eyes of Hittite kings. Limited evidence for the worship of him is also available from Nerik: a stele dedicated to him is attested, additionally he received offerings, including a sheep, during a ceremony in honor of the weather god of Nerik and tongues, ears and tails of various sacrificial animals on another occasion. According to Piotr Taracha, it is also possible that when after the temporary loss of the city Hittites returned to it, a new temple has been built for him, as references to a new house of worship dedicated to a deity designated by the logogram ^{d}ZABABA are known. Further cities where Wurunkatte was worshiped include Tuḫumijara, where a song invoking him was sung during a local festival, and Tarammeka.

Itamar Singer has proposed that a deity apparently belonging to the pantheon of the Kaška people designated by the logogram ^{d}ZABABA in a Hititte treaty might also be Wurunkatte. He assumed that the Kaška constituted a remnant of Hattian culture not absorbed by the Hittite state and pushed to the north.
