= XHT =

XHT may refer to:

- Cross-Harbour Tunnel, a road tunnel in Hong Kong
- The ISO 639-2 code for Hattic language, spoken by the Hattians in Asia Minor between the 3rd and the 2nd millennia BC
- .xht, a file extension for XHTML documents
