= Kayalıpınar, Yıldızeli =

Kayalıpınar
- Samuha
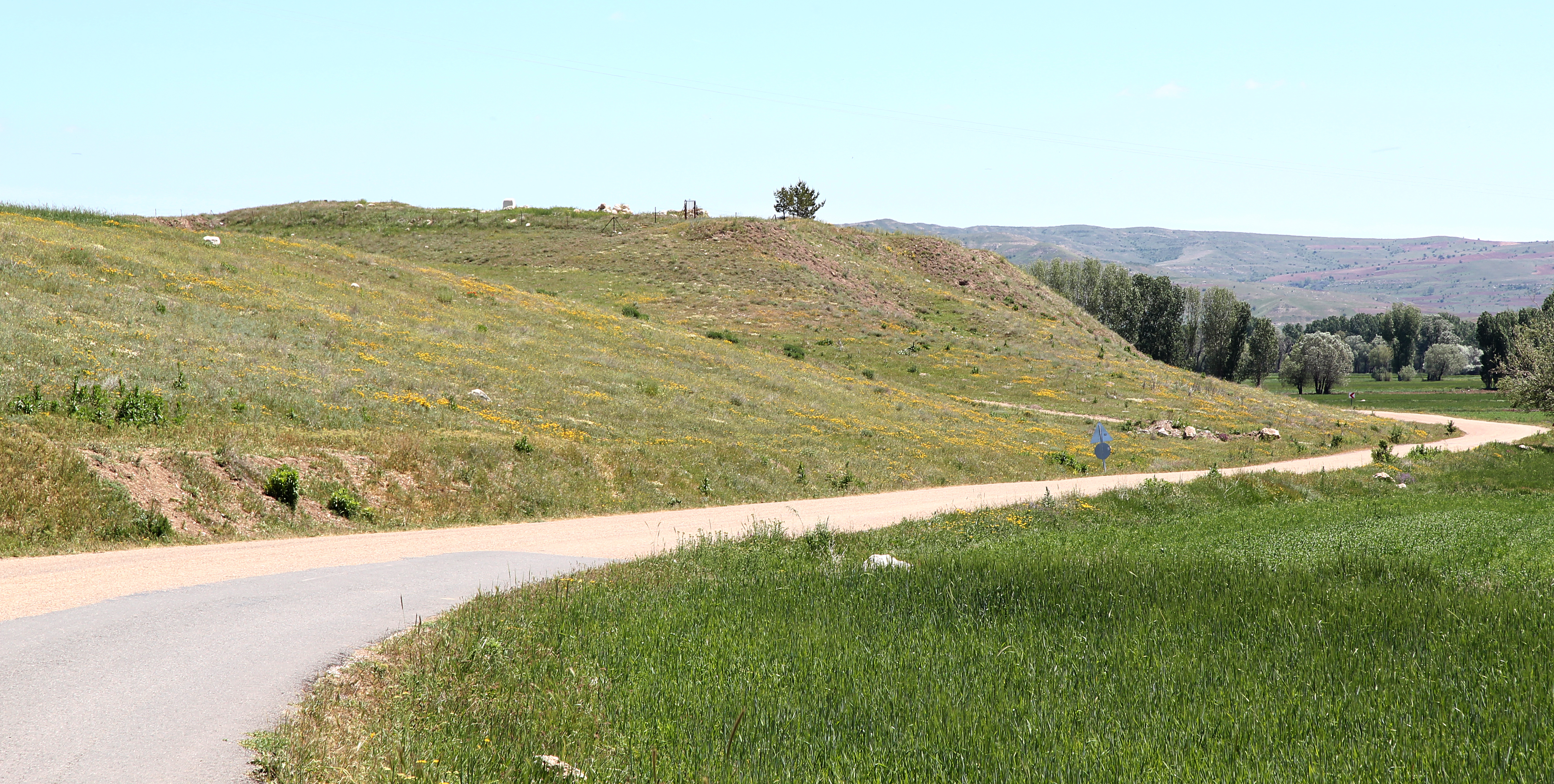
- Kayalıpınar mound as seen from the west

- Location within Turkey
- 39.61150°N 36.51117°E
- Type: Settlement
- Cultures: Hittite
- Location: Sivas Province, Turkey
- Region: Anatolia

Site notes
- Condition: In ruins

Kayalıpınar - ancient Šamuḫa on the map during the Assyrian karum period

Kayalıpınar is a village in Yıldızeli District, in Sivas Province, Turkey. Its population is 66 (2022). It is a Hittite archaeological site, under excavation since 2004. It is identified with the ancient Samuha settlement.

== History ==
The human settlement of Kayalıpınar started already in the 5th millennium BC. During the Middle Bronze Age the settlement grew to become a town. During the early kārum period, Kayalıpınar/Šamuḫa became a station (wabartum) of ancient Assyrian traders that eventually developed into a trading colony (kārum). The town controlled a bridge crossing Kızılırmak River. A palace is also mentioned in the texts.

=== Middle Bronze ===
==== Assyrian Trading Colony ====
The presence of ancient Assyrian traders is attested by several seals found in Kayalıpınar and two ancient Assyrian cuneiform tablets, one of which mentions the Anatolian personal name Tamura.

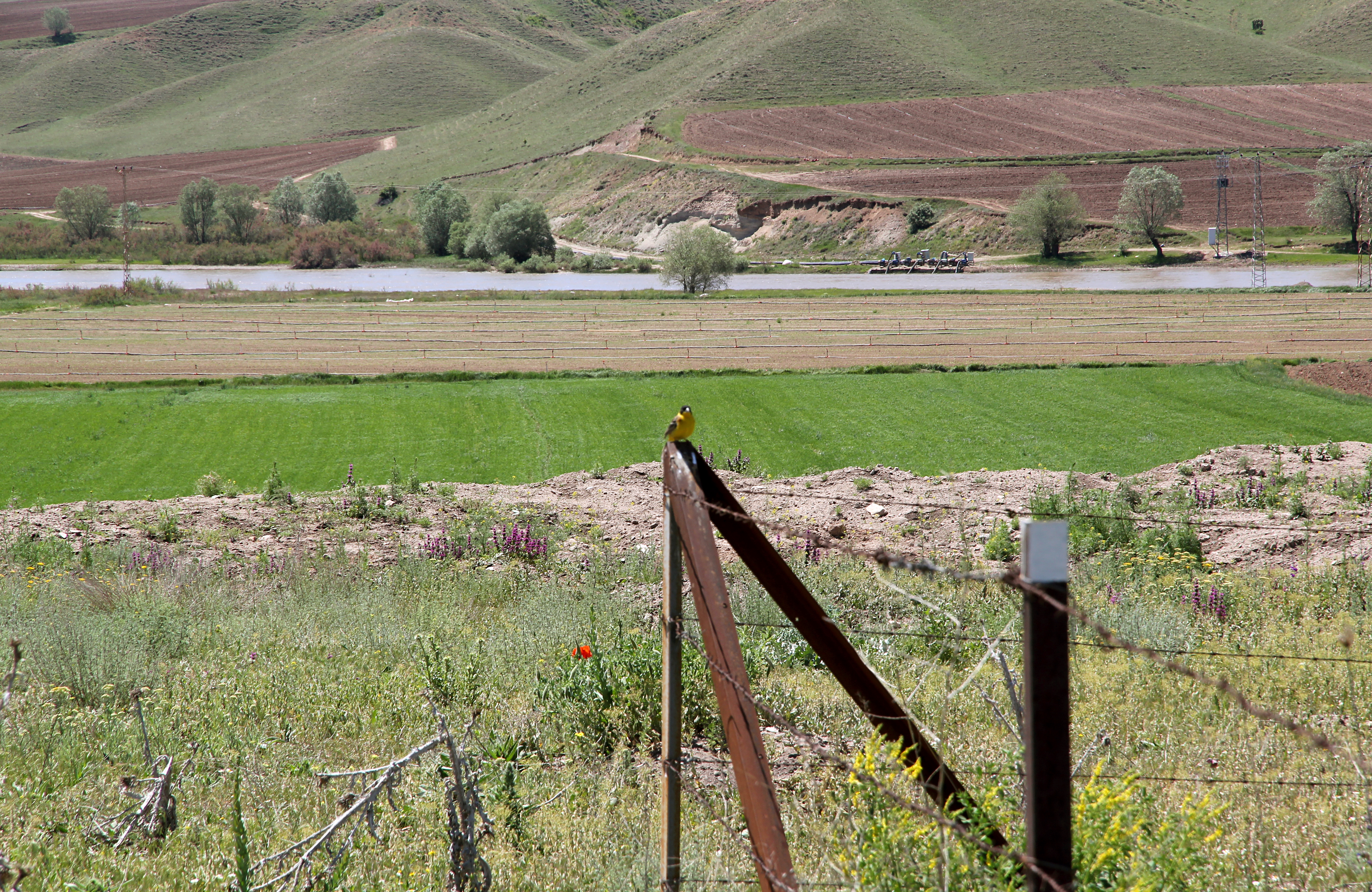
At the site of Kayalıpınar (Samuha). View from the mound south towards Kızılırmak river

=== Late Bronze ===
==== Hittite Period ====
After the kārum period city was destroyed, the Hittites built a new city with a palace complex. This city was destroyed in the Middle Hittite period, probably by an earthquake.

A seal that may belong to the layer of destruction points to the time of King Tudḫaliya I and his wife Nikkalmati, which indicates the date of around 1450 BC. Apparently, the same earthquake destroyed the mountain town of Šarišša, which was about fifty kilometers to the south-east. The destroyed city and palace were immediately rebuilt.

At the time of Tudḫaliya II, the palace was systematically plundered and burned down. According to the Hittite documents, this may have been done by the "enemy of Azzi", that took the Upper Land and "made Šamuḫa the border". The mining town of Šarišša was also plundered at that time.

== Modern settlement ==
The mosque of the village was built in 1883.

At the beginning of the 20th century, the village was a settlement place for Avars and Lezgins from the Caucasus.

== Bibliography ==
- Gojko Barjamovic: A Historical Geography of Anatolia in the Old Assyrian Colony Period; Kopenhagen 2011, ISBN 978-87-635-3645-5, pp. 151–154.
- Michele Cammarosano: Kultinventare aus Kalyalıpınar (Šamuḫa), in: Elisabeth Rieken (Hrsg.): Keilschrifttafeln aus Kayalıpınar 1. Textfunde aus den Jahren 1999–2017. Harrassowitz Verlag 2019. ISBN 978-3-447-11220-8 p. 73.
- Giuseppe F. del Monte, Johann Tischler: Die Orts- und Gewässernamen der hethitischen Texte: Répertoire Géographique des Textes Cunéiformes, Band 6. Reichert, Wiesbaden 1978: Šamuḫa, pp. 338–341.
- Müller-Karpe, Andreas; Rashidian, Elnaz; Süssenguth, Riko (2025). Beiträge zur Erforschung der hethitischen Stadt Samuha und ihrer Umgebung [Contributions to the study of the Hittite city of Samuha and its surroundings]. Marburg: Vorgeschichtliches Seminar, ISBN 978-3-8185-0578-3.
- Elisabeth Rieken (Hrsg.): Keilschrifttafeln aus Kayalıpınar 1. Textfunde aus den Jahren 1999–2017. Harrassowitz Verlag 2019. ISBN 978-3-447-11220-8
