= Pedachtoë =

Ancient Pontus town

Coordinates: 40°06′31″N 36°52′30″E

Pedachtoë or Pedachthoe, also known as Heracleopolis or Herakleioupolis (Ancient Greek: Ἡρακλειούπολις), was a town of ancient Pontus, inhabited during Roman and Byzantine times. It was assigned to the late Roman province of Armenia Prima, in which it became the seat of an archbishop. No longer a residential see, it remains a titular see of the Roman Catholic Church.

Its site is tentatively located near Akşehir in Asiatic Turkey, though others locate it at Güneykaya, Yıldızeli.

In ancient times it contained the sanctuary of Athenogenes of Pedachtoë.
