= Tudḫaliya III =

King of the Hittites

Tudhaliya III

King of Hittite
- Reign: c. 1380 – c. 1350 BC
- Predecessor: Arnuwanda I
- Successor: Suppiluliuma I
- Died: c. 1350 BC
- Spouse: Satandu-Heba; Tadu-Heba
- Issue: Tudhaliya; Henti
- Father: Arnuwanda I
- Mother: Asmu-nikal

The aedicula of king Tudhaliya III reading "My Sun, the Great King Tudhaliya"

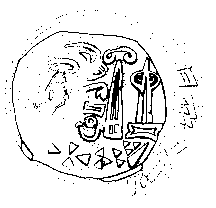

Tudḫaliya III (sometimes designated Tudḫaliya II; died c. 1350 BC), with the additional Hurrian name Tašmi-Šarri, was a Hittite great king in the 14th century BC, ruling from c. 1380 – c. 1350 BC. He was the son and successor of Arnuwanda I and the predecessor, father-in-law, and adoptive father of Šuppiluliuma I.

The numbering of Hittite kings named Tudḫaliya varies between scholars because of debate over the identity (or not) between the first two bearers of the name. Accordingly, some scholars designate Tudḫaliya III as "Tudḫaliya II" and apply the designation "Tudḫaliya III" to his son Tudḫaliya the Younger instead. While Tudḫaliya the Younger appears to have been the designated heir of Tudḫaliya III, it is not clear if he ever reigned before being eliminated by his brother-in-law Šuppiluliuma I.

Texts from the reign of Tudḫaliya III's grandson Muršili II and great-grandson Ḫattušili III portray the Hittite Kingdom on the brink of collapse under concentric attacks from the outside during his reign, and there is some evidence for such setbacks, although the dire situation might have been exaggerated for rhetorical purposes.

== Family ==
Tudḫaliya III, originally or additionally named Tašmi-Šarri, was the son of Arnuwanda I and his wife Asmu-Nikkal. Tudḫaliya III married twice, first to Satandu-Heba, and then to Tadu-Heba. Perhaps by Tadu-Ḫeba or lower-ranking consorts, Tudḫaliya III had several sons, including Tudḫaliya the Younger, who might have been young or underage when their father died, and were killed or exiled by the supporters of Šuppiluliuma. Additionally, Tudḫaliya III had at least one daughter, Henti, who was the first queen of Tudḫaliya III's successor Šuppiluliuma I. Šuppiluliuma, long considered the son of Tudḫaliya III, was therefore his son-in-law and possibly adopted son.

== Reign ==
While still at Hattusa, Tudḫaliya III wrote some letters to Tapikka. Tapikka was later destroyed during Tudḫaliya III's reign, but it was subsequently rebuilt under Šuppiluliuma I. Two documents were found there that bear his seal together with the name of Great Queen Šatandu-Ḫeba, his first wife. His second wife Tadu-Ḫeba is better known, and she survived as Great Queen into the reign of Suppiluliuma I. It seems that it was at some point during Tudḫaliya's reign that the capital was burnt down by the enemies of Kaska, and he had to move the capital elsewhere. This was the time known in literature as the ‘concentric invasions’ of Hittite.

Tudḫaliya III chose to make the city of Samuha, "an important cult centre located on the upper course of the Marassantiya river" his residence, as a temporary home for the Hittite royal court sometime after his abandonment of Hattusa in the face of attacks against his kingdom by the Kaška, Hayasa-Azzi and other enemies of his state.

Nevertheless, Šamuḫa too was, in its turn, seized by the forces from the country of Azzi, so the capital had to be moved to Sapinuwa.

At this time, the kingdom of Hittite was so besieged by fierce attacks from its enemies that many neighbouring powers expected it to soon collapse. The Egyptian pharaoh, Amenhotep III, even wrote to Tarhundaradu, king of Arzawa: "I have heard that everything is finished and that the land of Hattusa is paralysed." (EA 31, 26–27)

However, Tudḫaliya managed to rally his forces; indeed, the speed and determination of the Hittite king may have surprised Hittite's enemies including the Kaska and Hayasa-Azzi.

== Defeat of Hayasa-Azzi ==
Tudḫaliya III sent his general Šuppiluliuma, who would later become king, to Hittite's northeastern frontiers, to defeat Hayasa-Azzi. The Hayasans initially retreated from a direct battle with the Hittite commander. The Hittitologist Trevor Bryce notes, however, that Tudḫaliya and Šuppiluliuma eventually:

... invaded Hayasa-Azzi and forced a showdown with its king Karanni (or Lanni) near the city of Kumaha. The passage (in the 'Deeds of Suppiluliuma') recording the outcome of this battle is missing. But almost certainly, the Hittite campaign resulted in the conquest of Hayasa-Azzi, for subsequently Suppiluliuma established it as a Hittite vassal state, drawing up a treaty with Hakkana, its current ruler.

The Hayasans were now obliged to repatriate all captured Hittite subjects and cede "the border [territory] which Šuppiluliuma claimed belonged to the Land of Hatti."

Hittite New Kingdom royal family tree according to Trevor Bryce

Kantuzilli (Note: Scholars have suggested that Tudhaliya I/II was possibly a grandson of the Hittite king Huzziya II; the first Tudhaliya is now known to be the son of Kantuzzili (Bryce 1997, p. 131 suggested Himuili, but the new edition, Bryce 2005, p. 122, indicated Kantuzzili).)
Tudhaliya I/II (Note: Bryce (1997) does not consider it clear whether Tudhaliya I/II was one king or two (p. 133); the link points to Tudhaliya II. Among those who identify distinct kings Tudhaliya I and Tudhaliya II, Freu (2007) has Kantuzzili—his son Tudhaliya I—his son Hattusili II—his son Tudhaliya II (p. 311).)	Nikkalmati (Note: Bryce (1997), p. 139.)
Arnuwanda I	Asmunikal
Hattusili II? (Note: The existence of Hattusili II is doubted by many scholars (Bryce 1997, pp. 153–154; Bryce 2005, p. 141). Among those who accept the existence of Hattusili II, Freu (2007), p. 311, has Tudhaliya I—his son Hattusili II—his son Tudhaliya II.)	Tudhaliya III (Note: Bryce (1997), p. 158.)	Daduhepa (Note: Bryce (1997), p. 172.)	Zida (Note: Bryce (1997), p. 174.)
Tudhaliya the Younger (Note: Bryce (1997), p. 168.)	Henti (1)	Šuppiluliuma I	(2) Tawananna (Note: Also known as Malnigal; daughter of Burnaburias II of Babylonia (Bryce 1997, p. 173).)
Arnuwanda II	Telipinu (Note: ‘Great priest’ in Kizzuwadna and king (lugal) of Aleppo (Bryce 1997, p. 174).)	Sarri-Kusuh (Note: King (lugal) of Carchemish.) (Note: Bryce (1997), pp. 174, 203–204.)	Zannanza (Note: Zannanza died on his way to Egypt to marry a pharaoh's widow, probably Ankhesenpaaten, the widow of Tutankhamun (Bryce 1997, pp. 196–198).)	Gassulawiya (Note: Bryce (1997), p. 227.) (1)	Mursili II	(2) Tanuhepa (Note: Bryce (1997), p. 230.)
Talmi-Sarruma (Note: Bryce (1997), p. 220.)	Sahurunuwa (Note: Bryce (1997), p. 222.)	Muwatalli II	Halpasulupi (Note: Haas (2006), p. 91.)	Massanauzzi (Note: Massanauzzi married Masturi, king of the Seha River Land (Bryce 1997, p. 313).)	Hattusili III (Note: Bryce (1997), p. 296.)	Puduhepa (Note: Puduhepa was the daughter of the Kizzuwadnan priest Pentipsarri (Bryce 1997, p. 273).)
Ini-Tesub (Note: Bryce (1997), pp. 346, 363.)	Urhi-Tesub	Kurunta (Note: King (lugal) of Tarhuntassa (Bryce 1997, p. 296); apparently later Great King of Hatti (Bryce 1997, p. 354).)	Nerikkaili (Note: Nerikkaili married a daughter of Bentesina, king of Amurru (Bryce 1997, p. 294).)	numerous daughters (Note: Two daughters of Hattusili III were married to the pharaoh Ramesses II; one was given the Egyptian name Ma(hor)nefrure. Another, Gassuwaliya, married into the royal house of Amurru. Kilushepa was married to a king of Isuwa. A daughter married into the royal family of Babylon. A sister of Tudhaliya IV married Sausgamuwa, king of Amurru after his father Bentesina. From Bryce (1997), pp. 294 and 312.) and sons (Note: Bryce (1997), p. 332.)	Tudhaliya IV (Note: Bryce (1997), p. 363. Tudhaliya IV probably married a Babylonian princess, known by her title of Great Princess (dumu.sal gal) (Bryce 1997, pp. 294, 331).)
Talmi-Tesub (Note: Bryce (1997), p. 363.)	Arnuwanda III (Note: Bryce (1997), p. 361.)	Suppiluliuma II (Note: Last documented Great King of the Land of Hatti.)
Kuzi-Tesub (Note: King and then Great King of Carchemish (Bryce 1997, pp. 384–385).)

- (1) = 1st spouse
- (2) = 2nd spouse
- Small caps indicates a Great King (LUGAL.GAL) of the Land of Hatti; italic small caps indicates a Great Queen or Tawananna.
- Dashed lines indicate adoption.
- Solid lines indicate marriage (if horizontal) or parentage (if vertical).

References:
- Trevor Bryce (1997). The Kingdom of the Hittites. Oxford, England: Clarendon Press.
- Trevor Bryce (2005). The Kingdom of the Hittites (new edition). Oxford, England: Clarendon Press.
- Trevor Bryce (2012). The World of the Neo-Hittite Kingdoms. Oxford, England: Oxford University Press.
- Jacques Freu (2007). Les débuts du nouvel empire hittite. Paris, France: L'Harmattan.
- Volkert Haas (2006). Die hethitische Literatur. Berlin, Germany: de Gruyter.

== See also ==
- History of the Hittites

== Bibliography ==
- Beckman, Gary (2000), "Hittite Chronology," Akkadica 119-120 (2000) 19–32.
- Bryce, Trevor (2005), The Kingdom of the Hittites, Oxford.
- Freu, Jacques, and Michel Mazoyer (2007b), Les débuts du nouvel empire hittite, Paris.
- Klengel, Horst (1999), Geschichte des Hethitischen Reiches, Leiden.
- Stavi, Boaz (2011), "The Genealogy of Suppiluliuma I," Altorientalische Forschungen 38 (2011) 226–239. online
- Taracha, Piotr (2016), "Tudhaliya III's Queens, Šuppiluliuma's Accession and Related Issues," in Sedat Erkut and Özlem Sir Gavaz (eds.), Studies in Honour of Ahmet Ünal Armağanı, Istanbul: 489-498.
- Weeden, Mark (2022), "The Hittite Empire," in Karen Radner et al. (eds.), The Oxford History of the Ancient Near East, vol. 3 (From the Hyksos to the Late Second Millennium BC), Oxford: 529–622.

Regnal titles
Preceded by Arnuwanda I	King of Hittite c. 1380 – c. 1350 BC	Succeeded by Suppiluliuma I
