= Puruli =

Festival

Puruli (EZEN Puruliyas) was a Hattian spring festival, held at Nerik, dedicated to the earth goddess Hannahanna, who is married to a new king.

The central ritual of the Puruli festival is dedicated to the destruction of the dragon Illuyanka by the storm god Teshub. The corresponding Assyrian festival is the Akitu of the Enuma Elish. Also compared are the Canaanite Poem of Baal and Psalms 93 and 29.

Biblical Hannah has been suggested as a Hebrew version of Hannahanna.

== Literature ==
- J. G. Macqueen, Hattian Mythology and Hittite Monarchy, Anatolian Studies (1959).
- Theodor H. Gaster, Psalm 29, The Jewish Quarterly Review, University of Pennsylvania (1946)
