= Yıldızeli =

- Municipality
- Location within Turkey Location within Turkey Central Anatolia
- Coordinates: 39°51′51″N 36°35′54″E
- Country: Turkey
- Province: Sivas
- District: Yıldızeli

Government
  - Mayor: Yaşar Göktaş (MHP)
- Elevation: 1,401 m (4,596 ft)
- Population (2022): 6,420
- Time zone: UTC+3 (TRT)
- Area code: 0346
- Website: www.yildizeli.bel.tr

Yıldızeli is a town in Sivas Province of Turkey. It is the seat of Yıldızeli District. Its population is 6,420 (2022). Since March 2024, the mayor has been Yaşar Göktaş, Nationalist Movement Party (MHP).

== Name ==
Yıldızeli has been identified as the site of the ancient town of Phiara (Greek: Φίαρα), which according to Ptolemy was located in the district of Sargarausena in Cappadocia.

The town was known as Нап-ı Cedid or Yenihan (New Inn) in Ottoman times.

== History ==
Yıldızeli has a documented history and local cultural traditions..

In Hittite times, Yıldızeli was on the road that connected Hattusa and Sivas.

In the early 20th century, the kaza of Yıldızeli (Yenihan) had 63 primary schools (mekatib-i ibtidaiye) and 1 non-Muslim school (mekatib-i gayrimüslime), the non-Muslim school being an Armenian school with around 70 students (but in 1914 no teacher).

== Geography ==
Yıldızeli is located approximately 50 km from the city center of Sivas and 60 km from the city center of Tokat, at the intersection of the Sivas-Yozgat-Ankara (D.200) highway and the Sivas-Tokat-Amasya (D.850) highway. Yıldızeli also has railway access, and, via the Sivas Nuri Demirağ Airport, airport access.

== Demography ==
Various social communities reside in Yıldızeli, such as Alevis, Turkmens, Circassians, etc.

== Tourism ==
The district has a lot of touristic places as well as hot springs which are claimed to be curative for some diseases.
