= Yıldızeli District =

District of Sivas Province, Turkey

- District
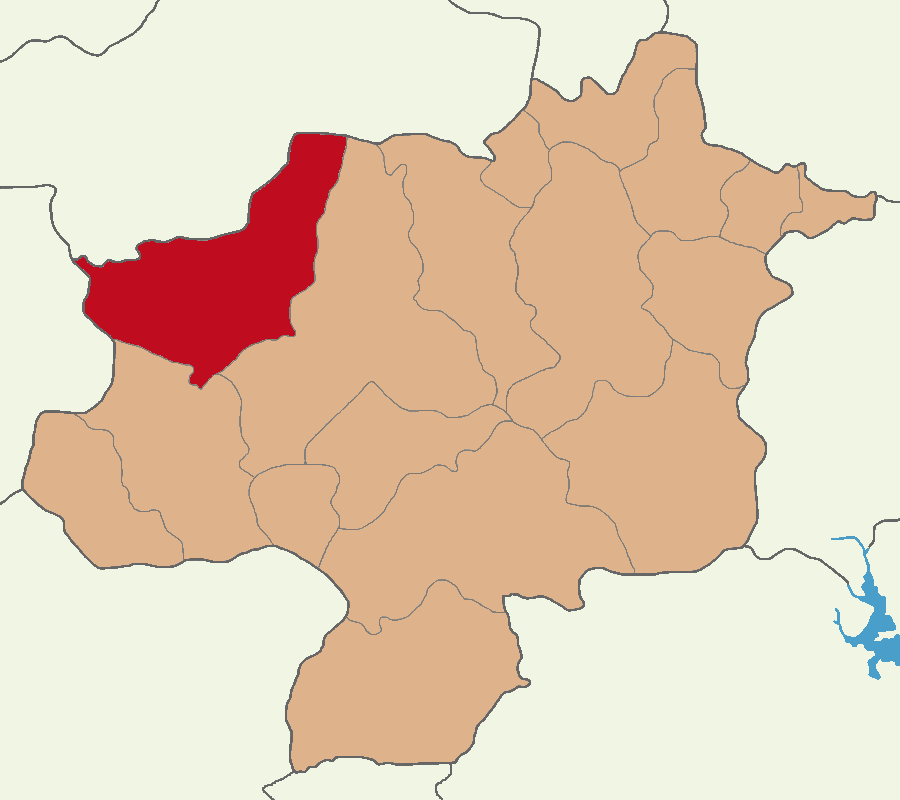
- Map showing Yıldızeli District in Sivas Province

- Location in Turkey Yıldızeli District (Turkey Central Anatolia)
- Coordinates: 39°52′N 36°36′E
- Country: Turkey
- Province: Sivas
- Seat: Yıldızeli

Government
  - Kaymakam: Altay Karadağ
- Area: 2,529 km^{2} (976 sq mi)
- Population (2022): 28,972
  - Density: 11/km^{2} (30/sq mi)
- Time zone: UTC+3 (TRT)
- Website: www.yildizeli.gov.tr

Yıldızeli District is a district of the Sivas Province of Turkey. Its seat is the town of Yıldızeli. Its area is 2,529 km^{2} (976 sq mi), and its population is 28,972 (2022).

== Composition ==
There are three municipalities in Yıldızeli District:

- Güneykaya
- Yıldızeli

There are 118 villages in Yıldızeli District:

- Akçakale
- Akçalı
- Akkoca
- Akören
- Akpınar
- Akpınarbeleni
- Alaca
- Altınoluk
- Arslandoğmuş
- Aşağıçakmak
- Aşağıekecik
- Avcıpınarı
- Bakırcıoğlu
- Banaz
- Başköy
- Bayat
- Bedel
- Belcik
- Buğdayören
- Büyükakören
- Çağlayan
- Çırçır
- Cizözü
- Çobansaray
- Çöte
- Çubuk
- Çukursaray
- Cumhuriyet
- Danaören
- Danişment
- Davulalan
- Delikkaya
- Demircilik
- Demiroluk
- Demirözü
- Dereköy
- Dikilitaş
- Direkli
- Direkli Sarıkaya
- Doğanlı
- Emirler
- Erenler
- Esençay
- Eşmebaşı
- Fındıcak
- Geynik
- Gökçeli
- Gökkaya
- Halkaçayır
- Hamzaşeyh
- İğdecikler
- İğnebey
- Ilıcaköy
- İncetaş
- İslim
- Kadıköy
- Kadılı
- Kaleköy
- Kalın
- Kaman
- Kapaklıkaya
- Kapı
- Karacaören
- Karakaya
- Karakoç
- Karalar
- Karaleylek
- Kavak
- Kavakdere
- Kayalıpınar
- Kerimmümin
- Kıldır
- Killik
- Kiremitli
- Kırkpınar
- Kıvşak
- Kızılköy
- Konaközü
- Küçükakören
- Kümbet
- Menteşe
- Merkez Sarıkaya
- Merkezyeniköy
- Mumcuçiftliği
- Nallı
- Nevruz
- Nevruzyaylası
- Ortaçakmak
- Ortaklar
- Sandal
- Sarıçal
- Sarıyar
- Seren
- Şeyhhalil
- Söğütpınar
- Subaşı
- Tatköy
- Tayalan
- Topulyurdu
- Töngel
- Üyük
- Üyükyaylası
- Yağlıdere
- Yakacık Çavuşlu
- Yakupköy
- Yassıkara
- Yavu
- Yaylagöze
- Yeniyapan
- Yeşilalan
- Yiğitler
- Yılanlıkaya
- Yolkaya
- Yücebaca
- Yukarıçakmak
- Yukarıekecik
- Yusufoğlan
- Yuvalıçayır
