= Tadu-Heba =

Tadu-Heba may refer to two queens of Ancient Near East:

- Tadukhipa (Hurrian: Tadu-Heba), daughter of Tušratta, a Mitanni king
- Tadu-Heba, wife of Tudhaliya III, a Hittite king
