= Güneykaya, Yıldızeli =

Güneykaya
- Municipality
- Location in Turkey Güneykaya (Turkey Central Anatolia)
- Coordinates: 40°08′42″N 36°48′49″E
- Country: Turkey
- Province: Sivas
- District: Yıldızeli
- Population (2022): 1,347
- Time zone: UTC+3 (TRT)

Güneykaya is a town (belde) in the Yıldızeli District, Sivas Province, Turkey. Its population is 1,347 (2022).

It is possibly the site of the ancient town of Pedachtoë.
