= Oymaağaç, Vezirköprü =

Oymaağaç
- Neighbourhood
- Location in Turkey
- Coordinates: 41.2051°N 35.4394°E
- Country: Turkey
- Province: Samsun
- District: Vezirköprü
- Population (2022): 1,649
- Time zone: UTC+3 (TRT)

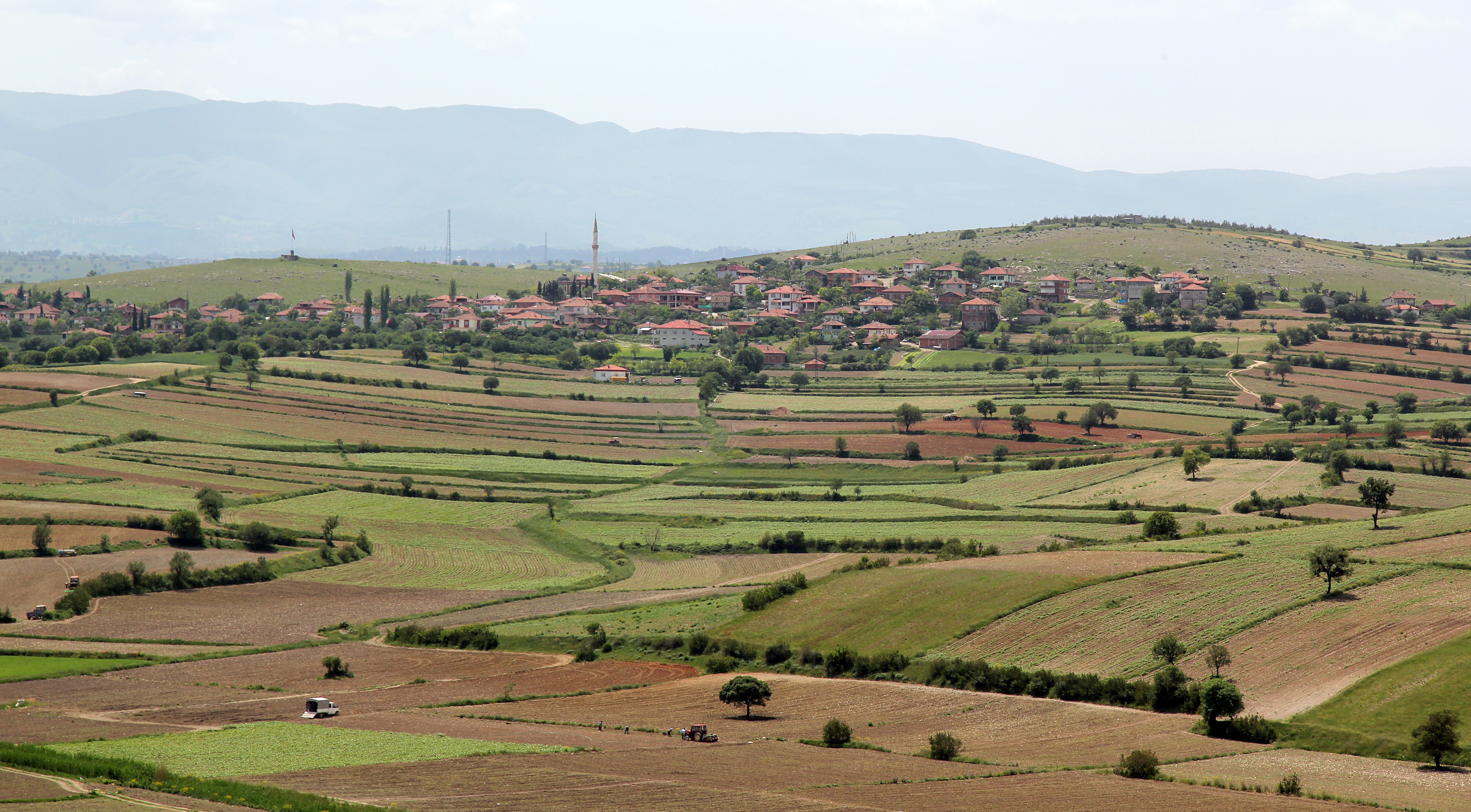
Oymaağac from the west

Oymaağaç is a neighbourhood in the municipality and district of Vezirköprü, Samsun Province, Turkey. Its population is 1,649 (2022). The Bronze Age Hittite settlement Nerik is situated near Oymaağaç.
