= Ḫalmašuit =

Hittite throne goddess

- Deified throne, protective goddess of kings
- Other names: Ḫanwašuit
- Major cult center: Kanesh, Hattusa, Ḫarpiša

Ḫalmašuit (Hattic Ḫanwašuit) was a goddess worshiped by Hattians and Hittites in Bronze Age Anatolia. She was the divine representation of a ceremonial throne, and acted as both an embodiment of royal authority and as a protective deity of kings.

== Name and character ==
The original Hattic form of the theonym Ḫalmašuit was Ḫanwašuit, with the phonetic change reflecting her adoption by the Hittites. It can be translated as "he (or she) sits on her", with n(i)waš meaning "to sit", ḫa being a locative prefix, and it a feminine suffix. In both Hattic and Hittite the name is identical with the word for throne, though they were written with different determinatives, respectively DINGIR and GIŠ. The aforementioned throne had the form of a dais, and the Hittite royal couple was seated on it during religious ceremonies.

There is no evidence that Ḫalmašuit was ever depicted in anthropomorphic form. She has accordingly been characterized as a "throne goddess" by Hittitologists. In both Hattian and Hittite tradition she was connected with the idea of kingship. She acted both as an embodiment of the concept of royal authority and as a protector of kings. This role was most likely responsible for her close association with the war god Wurunkatte. They are attested together in multiple offering lists. They also appear in sequence in a Hattic text enumerating the most important deities of the Hattian pantheon.

A ritual performed prior to the construction of a new palace (CTH 414) refers to an eagle as a messenger of Ḫalmašuit. Volkert Haas notes that these birds were commonly portrayed as servants of the gods across Anatolia and northern Syria, as already implied by texts from Ebla predating the Hittite sources.

== Worship ==
According to Piotr Taracha, Ḫalmašuit might have originally been regarded as a royal deity of Zalpa, and later spread to other areas after their rulers adopted the traditions of this city. She was the tutelary goddess of the dynasty of Kuššar, whose best known members Pitḫana and Anitta seized power in Kanesh in the Old Assyrian period. A text from the reign of the latter states that she was also the tutelary goddess of Hattusa, and that she surrendered the city to him after a famine. He subsequently brought her with him to Kanesh, and seemingly had a temple constructed for her there.

Ḫalmašuit was likely adopted as a royal deity by the kings of Hattusa during the reign of Ḫattušili I, possibly following the example of Anitta. A ritual preceding the construction of a new royal palace involved the Hittite king making a pact of friendship with Ḫalmašuit. In the thirteenth century BCE, a throne representing Ḫalmašuit stood in the temple of Wurunkatte in Hattusa.

A birth ritual listing the cult centers of various deities links Ḫalmašuit with the city of Ḫarpiša.

== Mythology ==
The god Zilipuri was considered the builder of the throne symbolically representing Ḫalmašuit, as attested in the text KUB 2.2.

An early Hittite myth describes Ḫalmašuit as a goddess living in the mountains. It relays that she was regarded a source of royal authority and protector of kings who brought them power from the sea and provided them with a ceremonial carriage (^{GIŠ}ḫuluganni). Volkert Haas argued that the reference to the sea is an allusion to the city of Zalpa, located on the Black Sea coast, but according to Piotr Taracha this is uncertain.
