= Maşat Höyük =

Masat Höyük
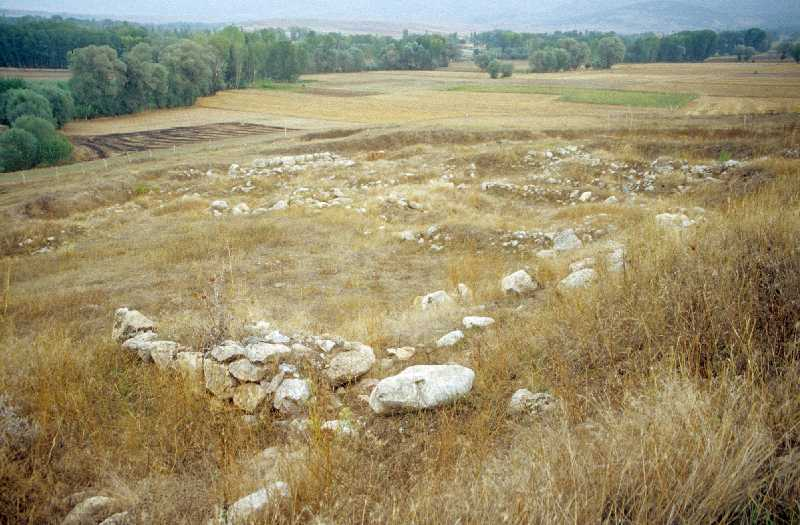

- Location in Turkey
- Coordinates: 40°08′54″N 35°45′44″E

Maşat Höyük is a Bronze Age Hittite archaeological site 100 km nearly east of Boğazkale/Hattusa, about 20 km south of Zile, Tokat Province, north-central Turkey, not far from the Çekerek River. The site is under agricultural use and is plowed. It was first excavated in the 1970s.

During the Hittite period, it is believed to have been named Tappika (Tabigga, Tabikka).

== History ==
=== Early Bronze ===
The site dates back to at least the Early Bronze Age. Most of the EBA remains on the upper city were destroyed in the construction of the Hittite palace. Some remain in the lower town.

=== Late Bronze ===
The enigmatic marauding Kaskas burned this site during Tudhaliya II's reign. The Hittites rebuilt it under the next king Suppiluliuma I.

117 cuneiform tablets, mostly correspondence, were found at the site, mostly during excavations between 1973 and 1981. The letters found at Masat Höyük were edited by Sedat Alp in a two-volume edition in Turkish and German in 1991. Most tablets here are correspondence between the site and the Hittite king, a "Tudhaliya" who was probably Tudhaliya II. Most concern the Kaska front. The exact span of time covered by this correspondence has been debated. Due to the small number of local officials named in the letters, and the fact that multiple letters appear to deal with the same events, most scholars have assumed the letters span no more than a couple of decades. It is possible that the letters all date from the span of just one or two years, and that they were only preserved because they were buried under the destruction layer when the city was burned by the Kaskas. The Hittites' capital at this time was either Sapinuwa (which has been found) or else Samuha (which has been identified since 2005 based on archives). One place-name mentioned in the texts is Tabigga/Tabikka/Tapikka, which is now generally considered to be the Hittite name of the Maşat Höyük site.

The site also contains 14th-century BC Helladic period ware from mainland Greece.

== Archaeology ==
The site of Maşat Höyük measures 450 by 225 meters, with a lower town and an upper citadel area which stands 29 meters above the plain. A cuneiform tablet was found on the surface by H. G. Güterbock in 1943 and published. A small excavation resulted in 1945. Full excavation did not begin until 1973, sponsored by the Turkish Historical Society.

Wood collected by field archaeologist Tahsin Özgüç of Ankara University at the upper Hittite level at Masat Höyük has been added to the Aegean Dendrochronology Project, a 30-year-long project established to build tree-ring chronologies for the Eastern half of the Mediterranean. The wood, which was tentatively dated to 1353 BCE, was retrieved from an excavation site of a building where archeologists also had found imported Late Helladic IIIA/B Stirrup jars, a famous form of pottery. In 2005, the project published an updated report on the dendrochronology research results for Anatolia.

== See also ==
- Cities of the ancient Near East
