= Illuyanka =

Mythical creature

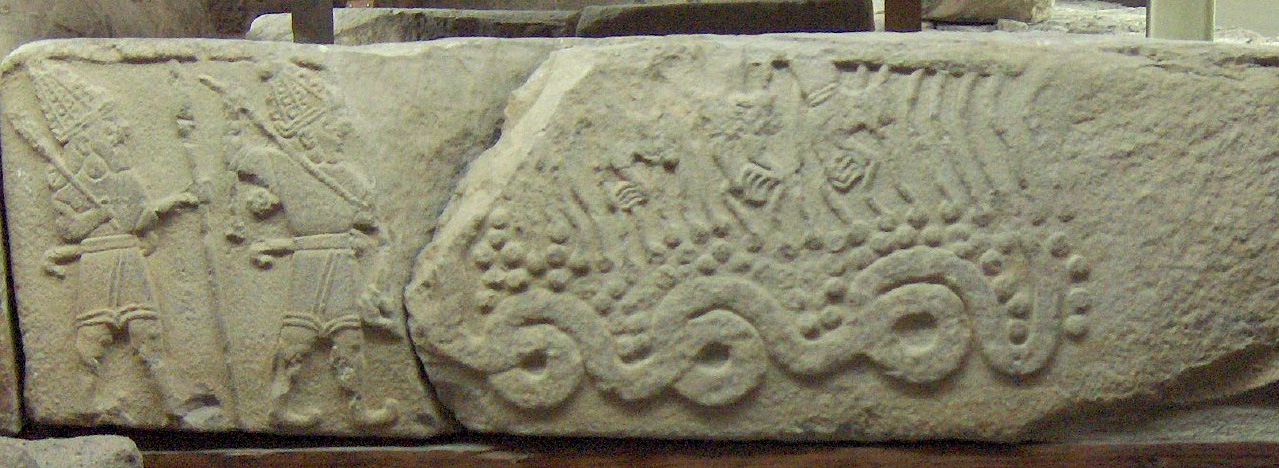
The sky god kills the dragon Illuyanka. Behind him is his son Sarruma. The twisting body of the snake is depicted in undulating lines with human figures sliding along Museum of Anatolian Civilizations, Ankara, Turkey

In Hittite mythology, Illuyanka was a serpentine dragon slain by Tarḫunz (^{d}IM), the Hittite incarnation of the Hurrian sky god and storm god. It is known from Hittite cuneiform tablets found at Çorum-Boğazköy, location of the former Hittite capital Hattusa. The contest is a ritual of the Hattian spring festival of Puruli.

The myth is found in Catalogue des Textes Hittites 321, which gives two consecutive versions.

== Name ==
Illuyanka is probably a compound, consisting of two words for "snake", Proto-Indo-European *h₁illu- and *h₂engʷeh₂-. The same compound members, inverted, appear in Latin anguilla "eel". The *h₁illu- word is cognate to English eel, and *h₂engʷeh₂ to Sanskrit ahi.

== Narrative ==
In the first version, the Storm God and Illuyanka fight, and the serpent wins. The Storm God then goes to the Hattian goddess Inaras for advice. Having promised to sleep with a mortal named Hupasiyas in return for his help, she devises a trap for the dragon. She goes to him with large quantities of food and drink and entices him to drink his fill. Once drunk, the dragon is bound by Hupasiyas with a rope. Then the Storm God appears with the other gods and kills the dragon.

In the second version, after the two gods fight and the Hurrian Storm God Teshub loses, Illuyanka takes the Storm God's eyes and heart. To avenge himself upon the dragon, the Storm God marries the daughter of a poor man. They have a son Sarruma, who grows up and marries the daughter of the dragon Illuyanka. The Storm God tells his son to ask for the return of the Storm God's eyes and heart as a wedding gift and he does so. His eyes and heart restored, the Storm God goes to face the dragon Illuyanka once more. At the point of vanquishing the dragon, the Storm God's son finds out about the battle and realizes that he had been used for this purpose. He demands that his father take his life along with Illuyanka's and so Teshub kills them both. A version of this narrative is illustrated on a relief which was discovered at Malatya (dating from 1050-850 BC) and is on display in the Museum of Anatolian Civilizations in Ankara, Turkey.

== Interpretation ==
The Hittite texts were introduced in 1930 by W. Porzig, who first drew parallels between Teshub's battle against Illuyanka and the battle of the sky god Zeus against serpent-like Typhon, told in Pseudo-Apollodorus, Bibliotheke (I.6.3); the Hittite-Greek parallels found few adherents at the time, the Hittite myth of the castration of the god of heaven by Kumarbi, with its clearer parallels to Greek myth, not having yet been deciphered and edited.

== Manuscripts ==
Catalogue des Textes Hittites 321 consists of the following tablets:

- A. KBo III 7
- B. KUB XVII 5
- C. KUB XVII 6
- D. KUB XII 66
- E. KUB XXXVI 54
- F. KBo XII 83
- G. KBo XII 84, XIII 84
- H. KBo XXII 99
- J. KUB XXXVI 53

None of the individual versions is complete. Text A is the most complete, including 30 out of 36 paragraphs.

== See also ==
- List of dragons in mythology and folklore
- Lotan, Ugarit sea serpent
- Jörmungandr, 'world serpent' in Norse myth
- Nidhögg, a dragon that gnaws at the world tree in Norse myth
- Tiamat, the chaos-dragon of Mesopotamia
- Kulshedra, multi headed dragon personifying storms in Albanian folklore
- Vritra, dragon personifying drought in Vedic religion
- Yamata no Orochi, eight-headed and eight-tailed dragon in Japanese legend
