= Sirkeli Höyük =

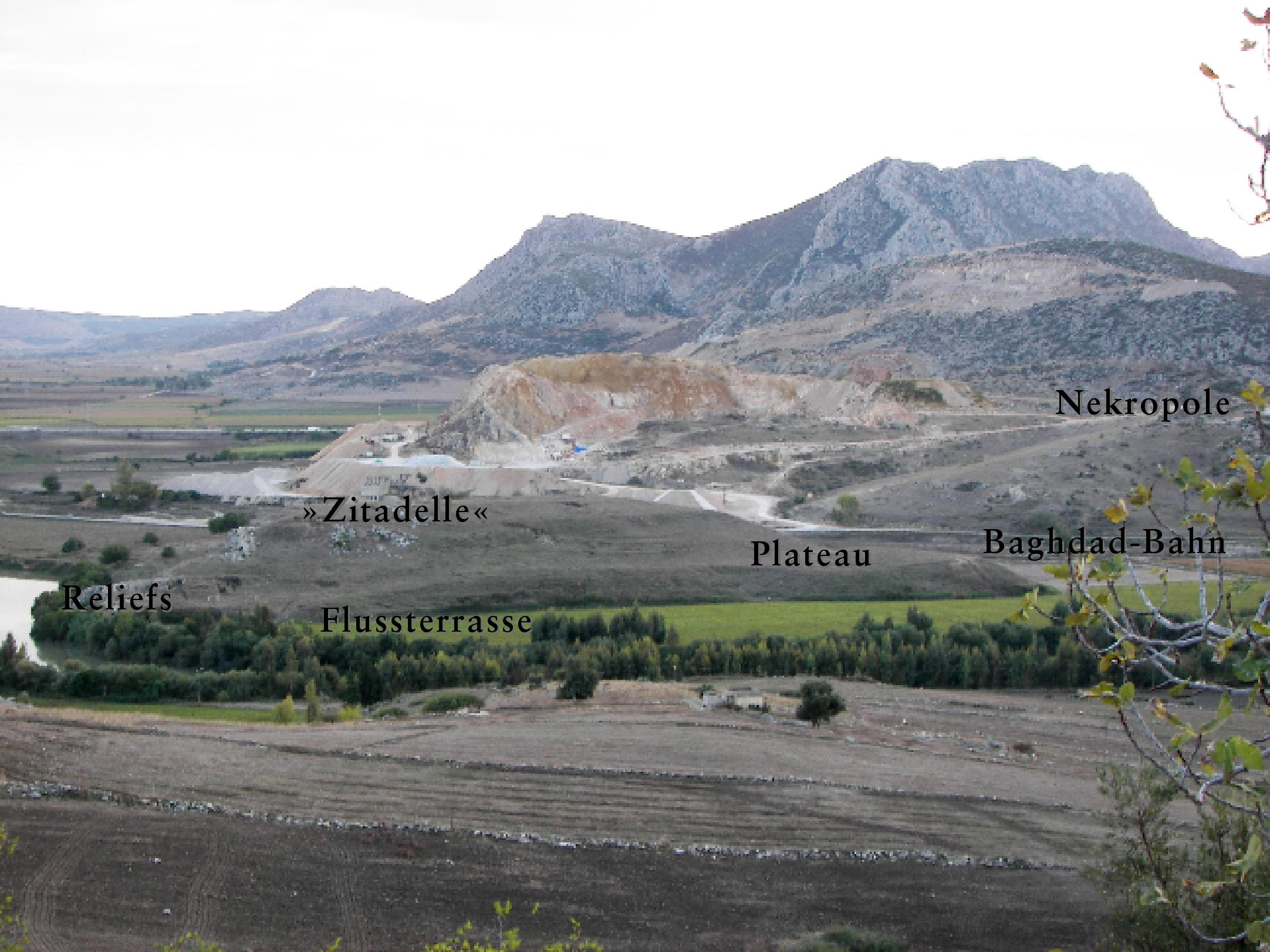

- Location within Turkey
- 37°0′14″N 35°44′43″E
- Type: tell
- Location: Ceyhan, Adana Province, Turkey
- Region: Cilicia

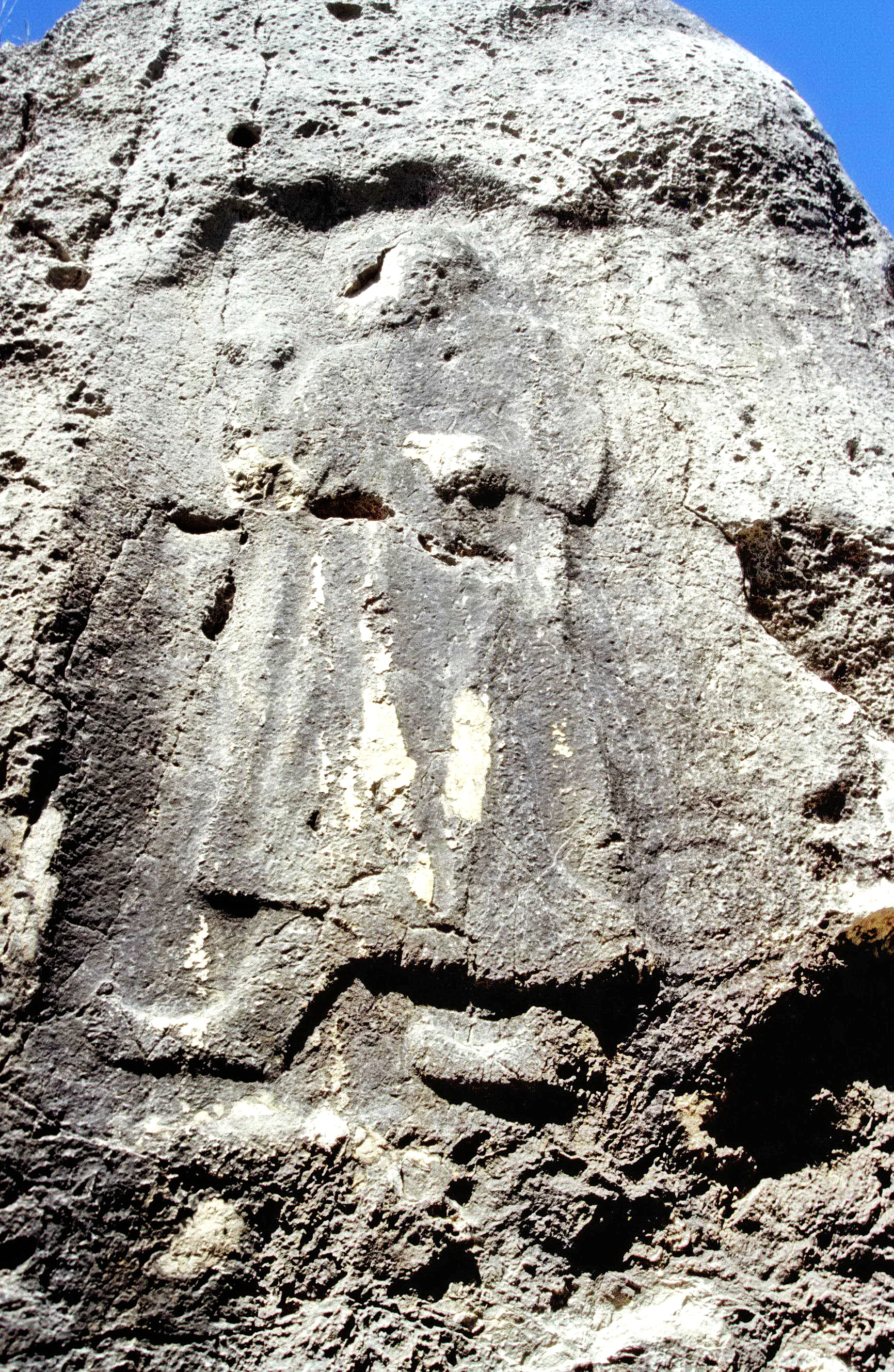
On the west bank of the Ceyhan river near the village of Sirkeli (Sirkeli Höyük), a late Hittite rock relief reminds of the presence of the Hittites in the Çukurova (Cilician Plain ). It shows the Hittite Great King Muwatalli II (1290–1272 BC)

Sirkeli Höyük is one of the largest tells (settlement mounds) of Cilicia with an area of approximately 80 ha. It is 40 kilometers east of the city of Adana, northwest of the village Sirkeli in the district of Ceyhan, at the breakthrough of the Ceyhan through the Misis Mountains (Turkish: Nur Dağ).
