= Hatip =

Village in Maharashtra

- Village
- Interactive map of Hatip
- Coordinates: 17°50′32″N 73°17′29″E
- Country: India
- State: Maharashtra

Hatip is a small village in Ratnagiri district, Maharashtra state in Western India. The 2011 Census of India recorded a total of 417 residents in the village. Hatip is 484 hectares in size.
