= Nerik =

Bronze Age settlement in northern Anatolia

- Narak
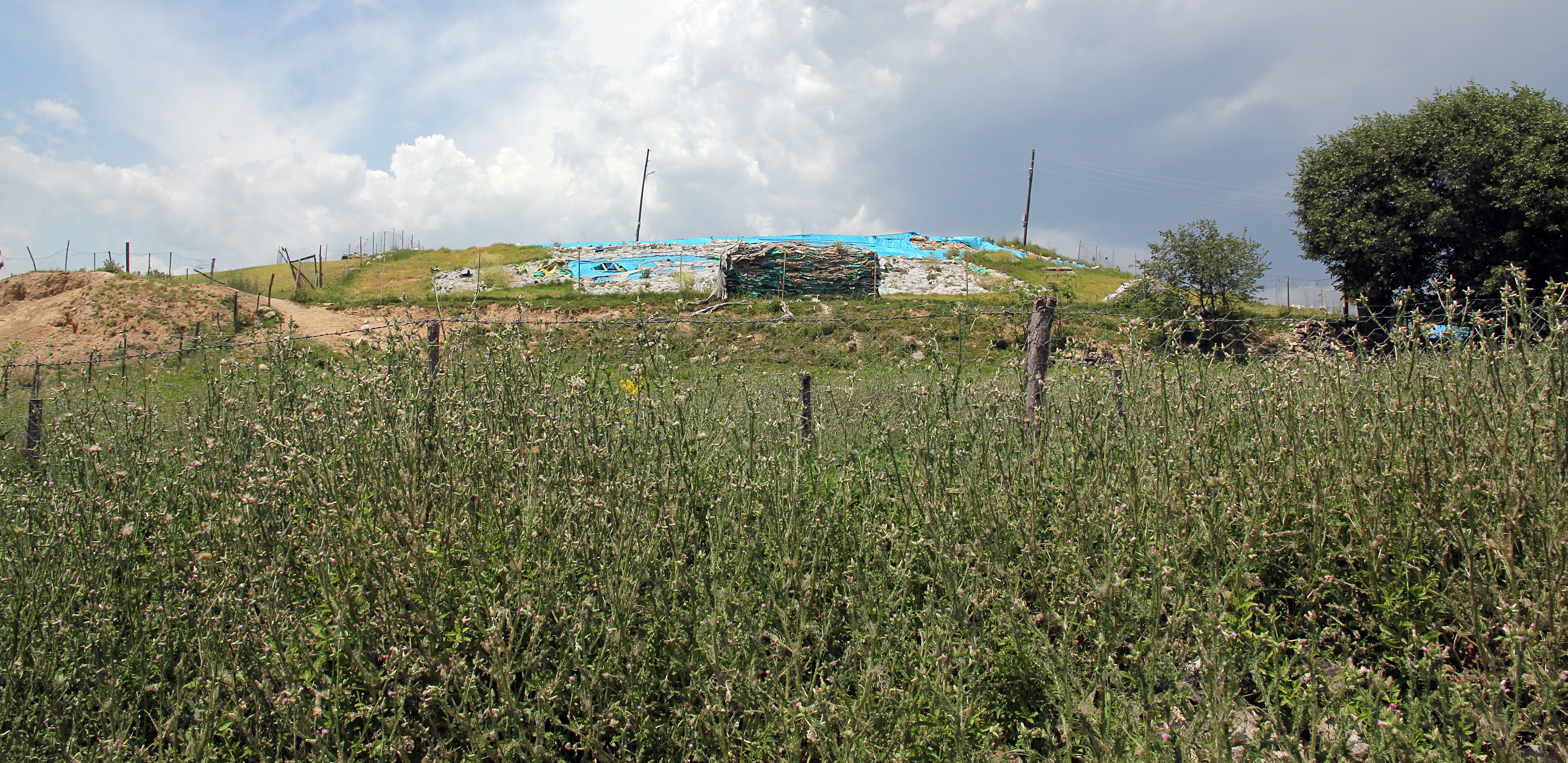

- Location of Nerik in Turkey
- 41.207°N 35.420°E
- Periods: Hittites
- Location: Oymaağaç, Vezirköprü, Samsun Province, Turkey
- Region: Black Sea Region

History
- Abandoned: 1200 BC

Site notes
- Excavation dates: 2005–
- Archaeologists: Rainer Maria Czichon

Nerik (Hittite: Nerik(ka)) was a Bronze Age settlement to the north of the Hittite capitals Hattusa and Sapinuwa, probably in the Pontic region. Since 2005–2009, the site of Nerik has been identified as Oymaağaç Höyük, on the eastern side of the Kızılırmak River, 7 km (4.3 mi) northwest of Vezirköprü.

== History ==
It was occupied in the Middle Bronze and Late Bronze. The Hittites held it as sacred to a Storm-god who was the son of Wurušemu, Sun-goddess of Arinna. The weather god is associated or identified with Mount Zaliyanu near Nerik, responsible for bestowing rain on the city.

=== Middle Bronze ===
==== Hittite Old Kingdom ====
Nerik was founded by Hattic language speakers as Narak; in the Hattusa archive, tablet CTH 737 records a Hattic incantation for a festival there. Under Hattusili I, the Nesite-speaking Hittites took over Nerik. They maintained a spring festival called "Puruli" in honor of the Storm-god of Nerik. In it, the celebrants recited the myth of the slaying of Illuyanka.

Under Hantili, Nerik was ruined (by the Kaška), and the Hittites had to relocate the Puruli festival to Hattusa.

=== Late Bronze ===
==== Hittite Middle Kingdom ====
As of the reign of Tudhaliya I, Nerik's site was occupied by the barbarian Kaskas, whom the Hittites blamed for its initial destruction.

==== Hittite New Kingdom ====
During Muwatalli II's reign (c. 1290 BC), his brother and appointed governor Hattusili III recaptured Nerik and rebuilt it as its High Priest. Hattusili named his firstborn son "Nerikkaili" in commemoration (although he later passed him over for the succession).

Seven years after Muwatalli's son Mursili III became king (c. 1270s BC), Mursili reassigned Nerik to another governor. Hattusili rebelled and became king himself.

Nerik disappeared from the historical record when the Hittite kingdom fell, ca. 1200 BC.

== Excavations ==
In 2005, Rainer Maria Czichon and Jörg Klinger of the Free University of Berlin began excavating Oymaağaç Höyük. Thus far, this is the northernmost place of Anatolia with remains from the Hittite Empire, including "three fragments of tablets and a bulla with stamps of the scribe Sarini. In addition, mention of the mountains, in which Nerik was located, have been found at the site, as well as features suggestive of monumental Hittite architecture." The team has published a number of articles related to their excavations.

According to Czichon, who is currently in the archaeology faculty at Uşak University, many stone and loom artifacts were unearthed during the excavations. Mining tools were found for copper deposits situated at nearby Tavşan Mountain field. The most valuable artifacts are tablets with cuneiform script, which point out the site as Nerik. An inventory list showing tools, including silver trays and golden bullae contained in an unknown shrine, is also among the findings.
