= Hattic language =

Ancient language of Asia Minor

Hattic
- Hatti, Khattic, Proto-Hittite, Hattian
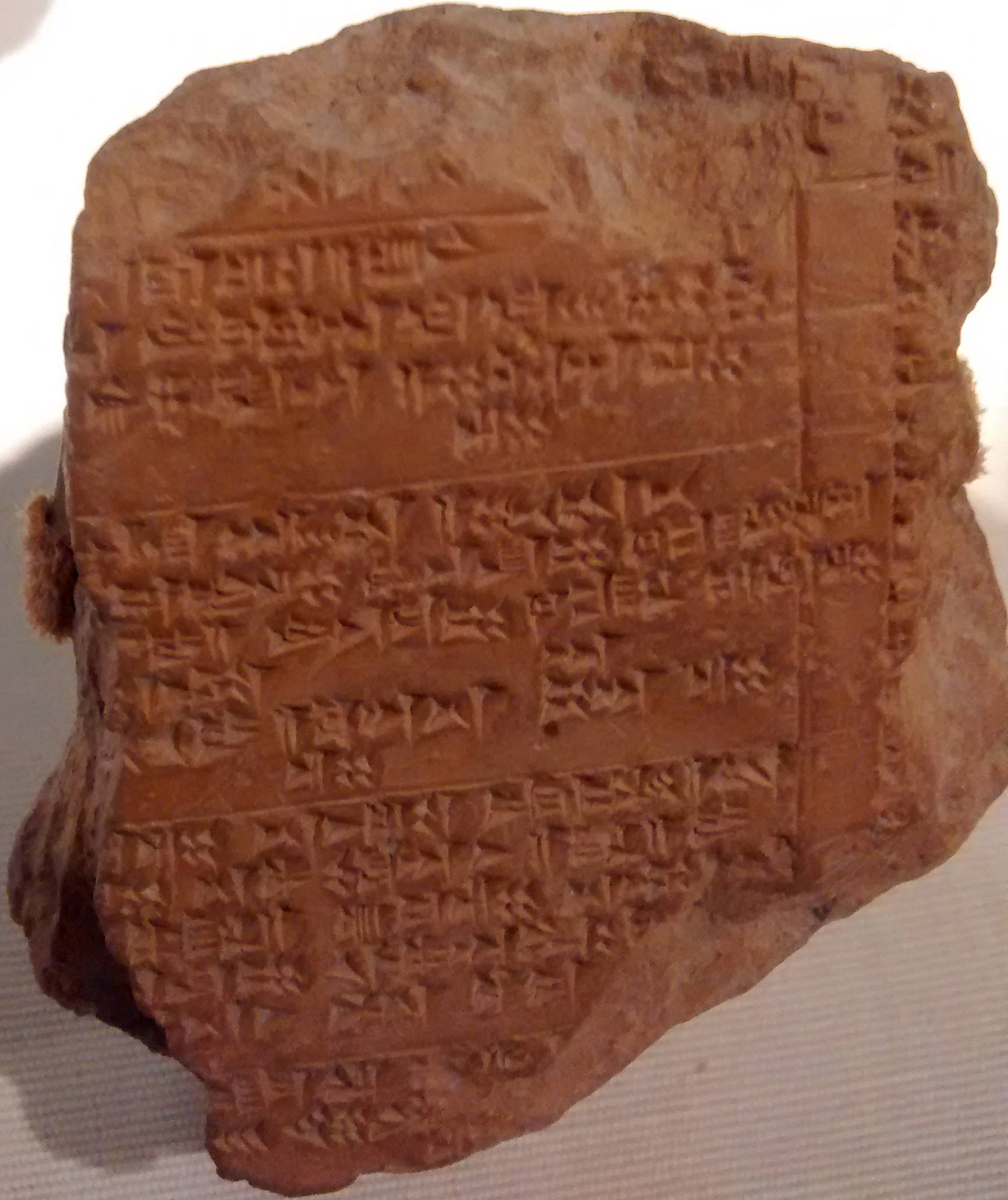
- CTH 738: Festival for Goddess Tetešḫapi; bilingual text in Hittite and Hattic
- Region: Anatolia
- Ethnicity: Hattians
- Extinct: c. 900 BC
- Language family: Unclassified language isolate

Language codes
- ISO 639-3: xht
- Glottolog: hatt1246
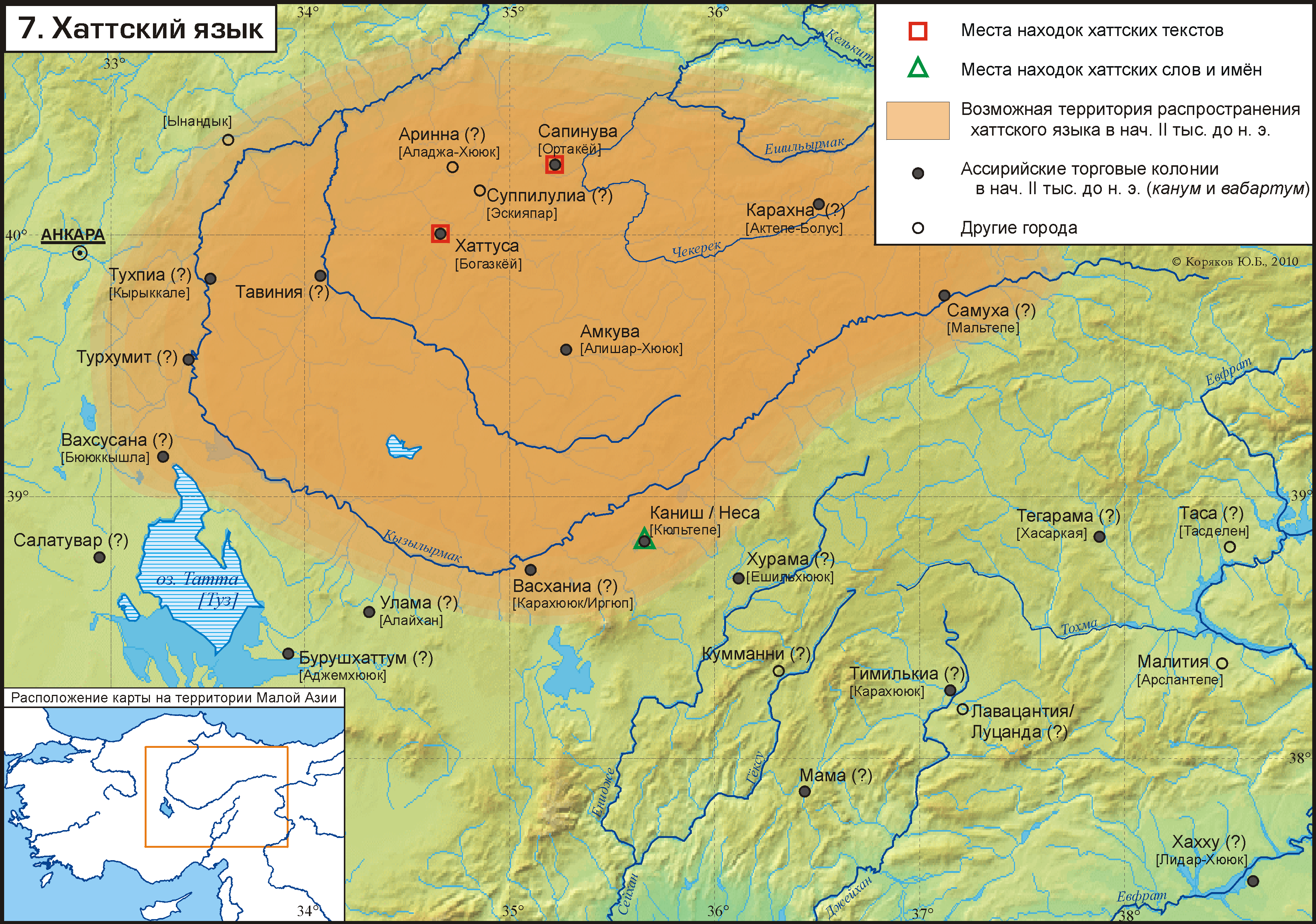
- Map of Hattic distribution in Anatolia

Hattic, or Hattian, was a non-Indo-European agglutinative language spoken by the Hattians in Asia Minor in the 2nd millennium BC. Scholars call the language "Hattic" to distinguish it from Hittite, the Indo-European language of the Hittite Empire. The Hittites referred to the language as hattili (there are no attestations of the name of the language in Hattic itself), related to the Assyrian and Egyptian designation of an area west of the Euphrates as "Land of the Hatti" (Khatti).

The heartland of the oldest attested language of Anatolia before the arrival of Hittite-speakers, ranged from Hattusa, then called "Hattus", northward to Nerik. Other cities mentioned in Hattic include Tuhumiyara and Tissaruliya. Hittite-speakers conquered Hattus from Kussara to its south in the 18th century BC. They absorbed or replaced the Hattic-speaking ruling class (Hattians) but retained the name Hatti for the region. The name of the inhabitants of that area is likewise identified with the Biblical Heth, from which, in turn, the English word Hittite is derived.

== Classification ==
Certain similarities between Hattic and both Abkhazo-Adyghean and Kartvelian languages have led to proposals by some scholars about the possibility of a linguistic bloc from central Anatolia to the Caucasus.

According to Alexey Kassian, there are also possible lexical correspondences between Hattic and Yeniseian languages, as well as with the Burushaski language; for instance, "tongue" is alef in Hattic and alup in Kott, "moon" is kap in Hattic and qīp in Ket, "mountain" is ziš in Hattic and ćhiṣ in Burushaski (compare also with *čɨʔs – a Proto-Yeniseian word for "stone").

Relationship with Kaskian, another non-Indo-European language in Anatolia, has also been proposed.

== Corpus ==
No document has been found in which native Hattic-speakers wrote their own language. Scholars must rely on indirect sources or mentions by their neighbours and successors, the Hittites. Some Hattic words can be found in religious tablets of Hittite priests that date from the 14th and the 13th centuries BC. The passages contained, between the lines of the text signs, the explanation "the priest is now speaking in Hattic".

Roots of Hattic words can also be found in the names of mountains, rivers, cities and gods. Other Hattic words can be found in some mythological texts.

All published Hattic documents are catalogued in the Catalogue des textes hittites (CTH). Documents from Hattusa span CTH 725–745. Of these CTH 728, 729, 731, 733, and 736 are Hattic/Hittite bilinguals. CTH 737 is a Hattic incantation for the festival at Nerik. One key, if fragmentary, bilingual is the story of "The Moon God Who Fell from the Sky". (There are additional Hattic texts in Sapinuwa, which had not been published as of 2004.)

== Grammar ==
Hattic has been claimed to form conventional plurals with a le- prefix: "children" = le-pinu; however, most specialists today consider it to be a possessive pronominal clitic, meaning "his" or "their". It formed a collective plural by attaching the prefix fa-: fa-shaf "gods".

=== Case ===
The genitive case was declined with the suffix -(u)n (fur "land" but furun "the land's"). Some linguists like Polomé and Winter have claimed that the accusative case was marked with es- and give the example of ess-alep "word", but that has been identified by others as a pronominal clitic, meaning "their".

== Vocabulary ==
Some known Hattic words include:

- alef = "tongue"
- ashaf = "god"
- fa-zari = "humankind, population"
- fel = "house"
- *findu = "wine" (found in the compound findu-qqaram "wine-ladle")
- fur = "land"
- Furun-Katte = "King of the Land", the Hattic war god
- Furu-Semu = Hattic sun goddess
- Hanfasuit = Hattic throne goddess
- hilamar = "temple"
- Kasku = the Hattic moon god
- katte = "king"
- -nifas = "to sit"
- pinu = "child"
- zari = "mortal"
- -zi = "to put"

== Sources ==
- Akurgal, Ekrem – The Hattian and Hittite Civilizations; Publications of the Republic of Turkey; Ministry of Culture; 2001; 300 pages; ISBN 975-17-2756-1
- Ardzinba, Vladislav. (1974): Some Notes on the Typological Affinity Between Hattian and North-West Caucasian (Abkhazo-Adygian) Languages. In: "Internationale Tagung der Keilschriftforscher der sozialistischen Länder", Budapest, 23.-25. April 1974. Zusammenfassung der Vorträge (Assyriologica 1), p. 10-15.
- Ardzinba, V.G. (1979): “Nekotorye sxodnye strukturnye priznaki xattskogo i abxazo-adygskix jazykov”. Peredneasiatskij Sbornik III: istorija i filologija stran drevnego vostoka, 26-37. Moscow: Nauka
- Chirikba, Viacheslav (1996): Common West Caucasian. The Reconstruction of its Phonological System and Parts of its Lexicon and Morphology. Leiden: CNWS Publications, 452 pp. [Chapter XI. The relation of West Caucasian to Hattic, p. 406-432].
- Dunaevskaja, Irina. (1973): Bemerkungen zu einer neuen Darstellung altkleinasiatischer Sprachen. 2. Zum Hattischen. In: Orientalische Literaturzeitung 68, Leipzig, 1/2.
- Дунаевская И. М. О структурном сходстве хаттского языка с языками северо-западного Кавказа. – Сборник в честь академика Н. А. Орбели. – М.-Л., 1960.
- Dunaevskaja, I. M. & D´jakonov, I. M. 1979. “Xattskij (protoxettskij) jazyk”. In: Jazyki Azii i Afriki, III. Jazyki drevnej perednej Azii (nesemitskie), Iberijsko-Kavkazskie jazyki, Paleoaziatskie jazyki, ed. by G. D. Sanžeev, p. 79-83. Moskva. Nauka.text online
- Girbal, Christian. (1986): Beiträge zur Grammatik des Hattischen (Europäische Hochschulschriften Reihe XXI, Bd. 50). Frankfurt am Main, Bern, New York: Verlag Peter Lang, V+201 pages.
- Goedegebuure, Petra M. (2010): The Alignment of Hattian. An Active Language with Ergative Base. Babel und Bibel 4/2: 949-981 (= Leonid Kogan et al. (Hg.): Language in the Ancient Near East. Proceedings of the 53e Rencontre Assyriologique Internationale I.2.). text online
- Ivanov, Vyacheslav V., "On the Relationship of Hattic to the Northwest Caucasian Languages," in B. B. Piotrovskij, Vyacheslav V. Ivanov and Vladislav G. Ardzinba, eds., Drevnyaya Anatoliya – Ancient Anatolia, Moscow: Nauka (1985) 26-59. In Russian with English summary.
- Kammenhuber, Annelis (1969): Das Hattische. In: Handbuch der Orientalistik, Abteilung I, Bd II, Abschn. 1/2.
- Касьян А.С. (2010). Хаттский язык // Языки мира: Древние реликтовые языки Передней Азии / РАН. Институт языкознания. Под ред. Н.Н. Казанского, А.А. Кибрика, Ю.Б. Корякова. М.: Academia. (in Russian). text online
- Klinger, Jörg. (1996): (StBoT 37) Untersuchungen zur Rekonstruktion der hattischen Kultschicht. Wiesbaden: Harrassowitz, xx+916 p.
- Rizza, Alfredo. (2007): I pronomi enclitici nei testi etei di traduzione dal Hattico. Pavia. (Studia Mediterranea 20).
- Schrijver, Peter (2018): The Verbal Syntax of Hattian. Altorientalische Forschungen 2018; 45(2): 213–245. text online
- Schrijver, Peter (2019): Talking Neolithic: The Case for Hatto-Minoan and its Relationship to Sumerian. In Kroonen, Guus and Mallory, James P. and Comrie, Bernard (eds.), Proceedings of the workshop on Indo-European origins held at the Max Planck Institute for Evolutionary Anthropology, Leipzig, December 2-3, 2013, 336-374. Washington, D.C.: Institute for the Study of Man. text online
- Schuster, H.-S. (1974): Die hattisch-hethitischen Bilinguen. I. Einleitung, Texte und Kommentar. Teil 1. Leiden: E.J. Brill.
- Soysal, Oğuz (2004): Hattischer Wortschatz in hethitischer Textüberlieferung, Leiden/Boston: Brill.
- Taracha, P. (1995): Zum Stand der hattischen Studien: Mögliches und Unmögliches in der Erforschung des Hattischen. In: Atti del II Congresso Internaziomale di Hittitologia a curo di Onofrio Carruba – Mauro Giorgieri – Clelia Mora. Studia mediterranea. 9. Gianni Iuculano Editore. Pavia, p. 351-358.
- Kevin Tuite (Université de Montréal): The rise and fall and revival of the Ibero-Caucasian hypothesis. text online
- Zsolt, Simon. (2012): Untersuchungen zur hattischen Grammatik. Phonologie, Morphologie und Syntax. Budapest, PhD thesis. text online
