= Gavur Castle =

Castle in Haymana, Ankara, Turkey

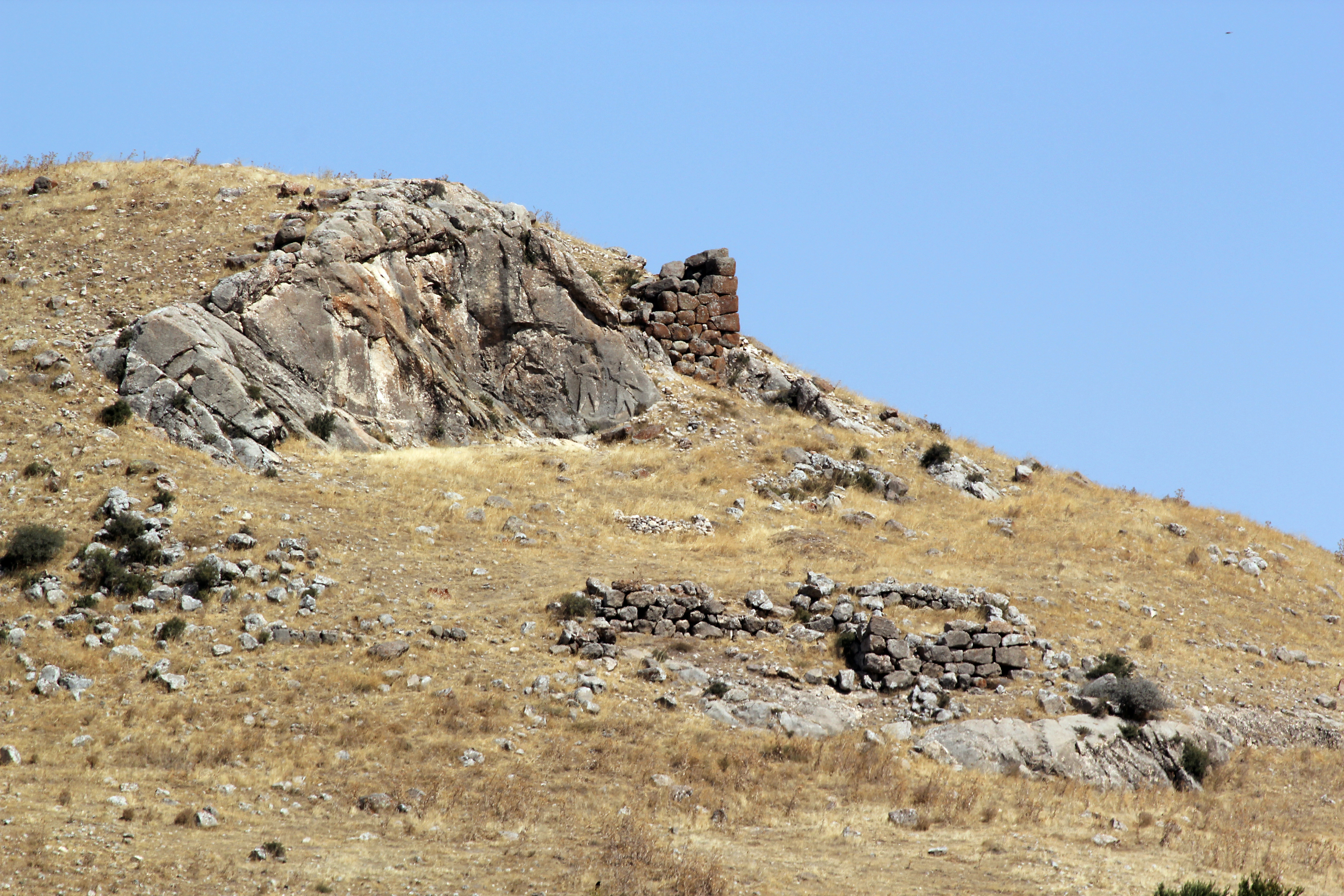
- The site in 2013

General information
- Location: Haymana, Ankara, Turkey
- Completed: c. 1650 BC

Technical details
- Material: Stone

Gavur Castle, formerly known as Ghiaour and Giaour castle, all meaning infidel's castle (from Gavur), is a castle located in the Dereköy neighborhood of Haymana, on the road to the Kara Ömerli neighborhood.

== History ==
Researchers determined that it was built between 1600 and 1700 BC, during the years when the Hittites ruled. There are 2 distinct soldier reliefs on the outer walls of the castle and a depiction of a female figure that can hardly be seen with the naked eye today. The excavation of the Gavur Castle was at the request of Mustafa Kemal Atatürk.

== Gallery ==
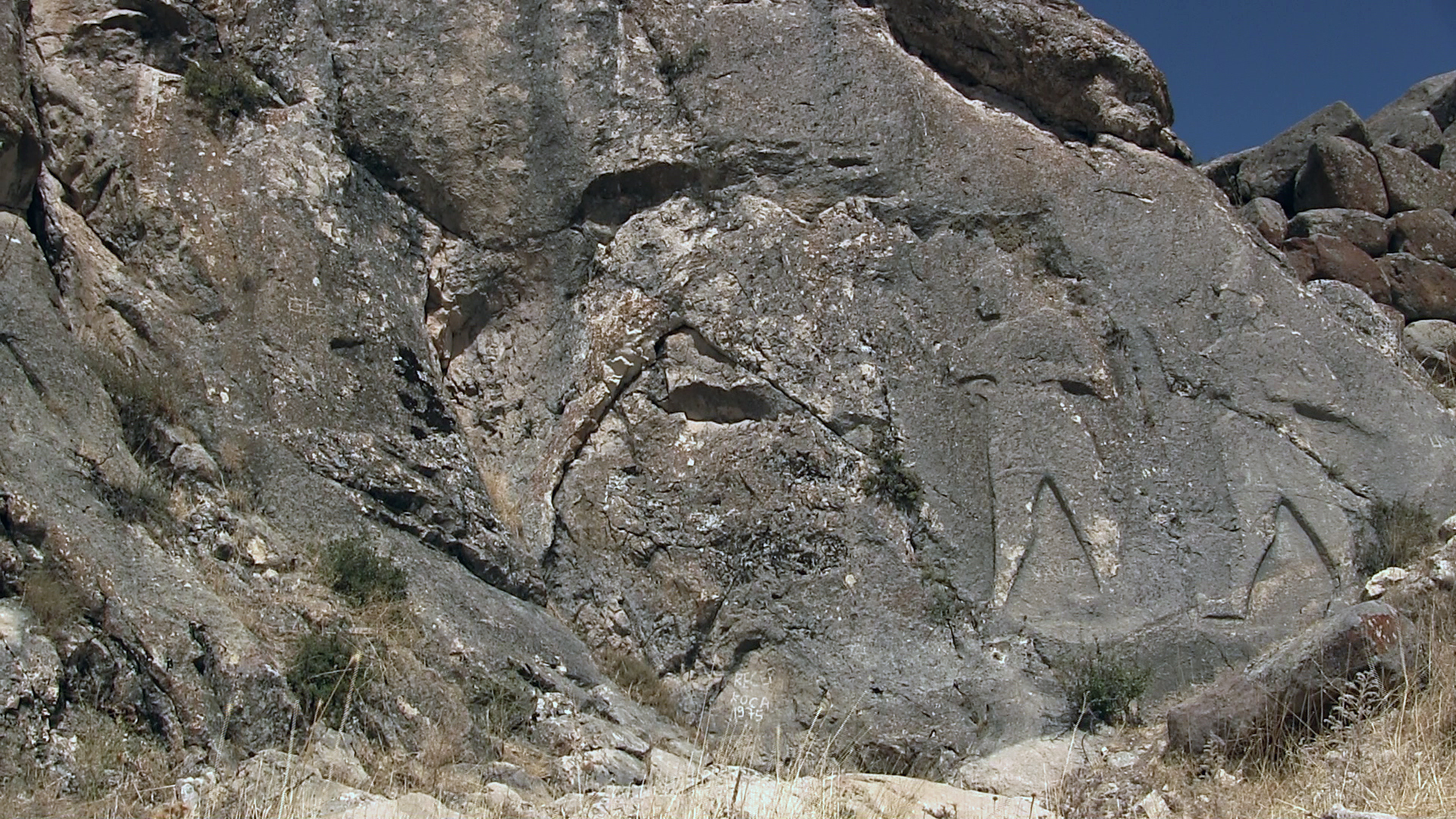
Reliefs

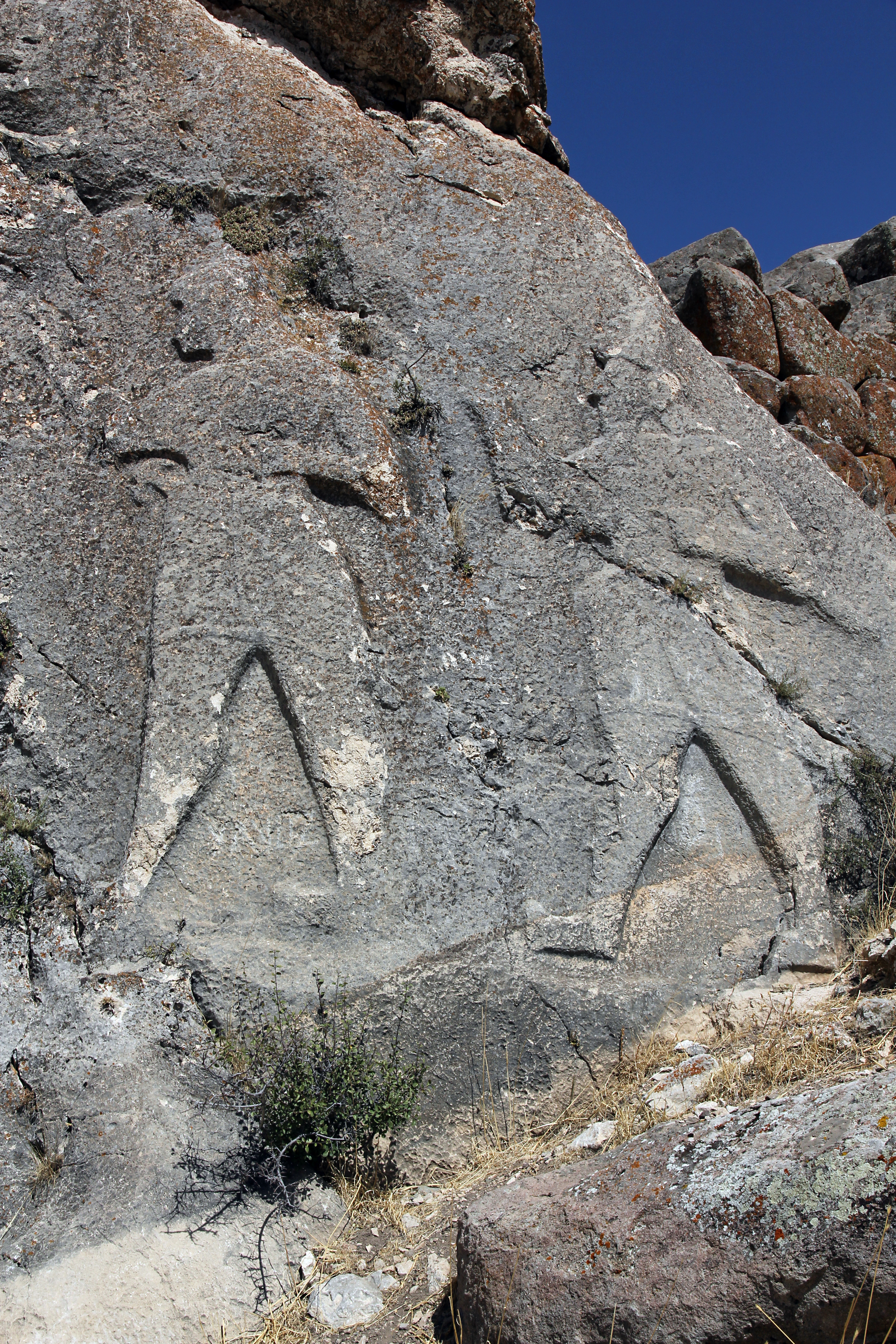
Male gods

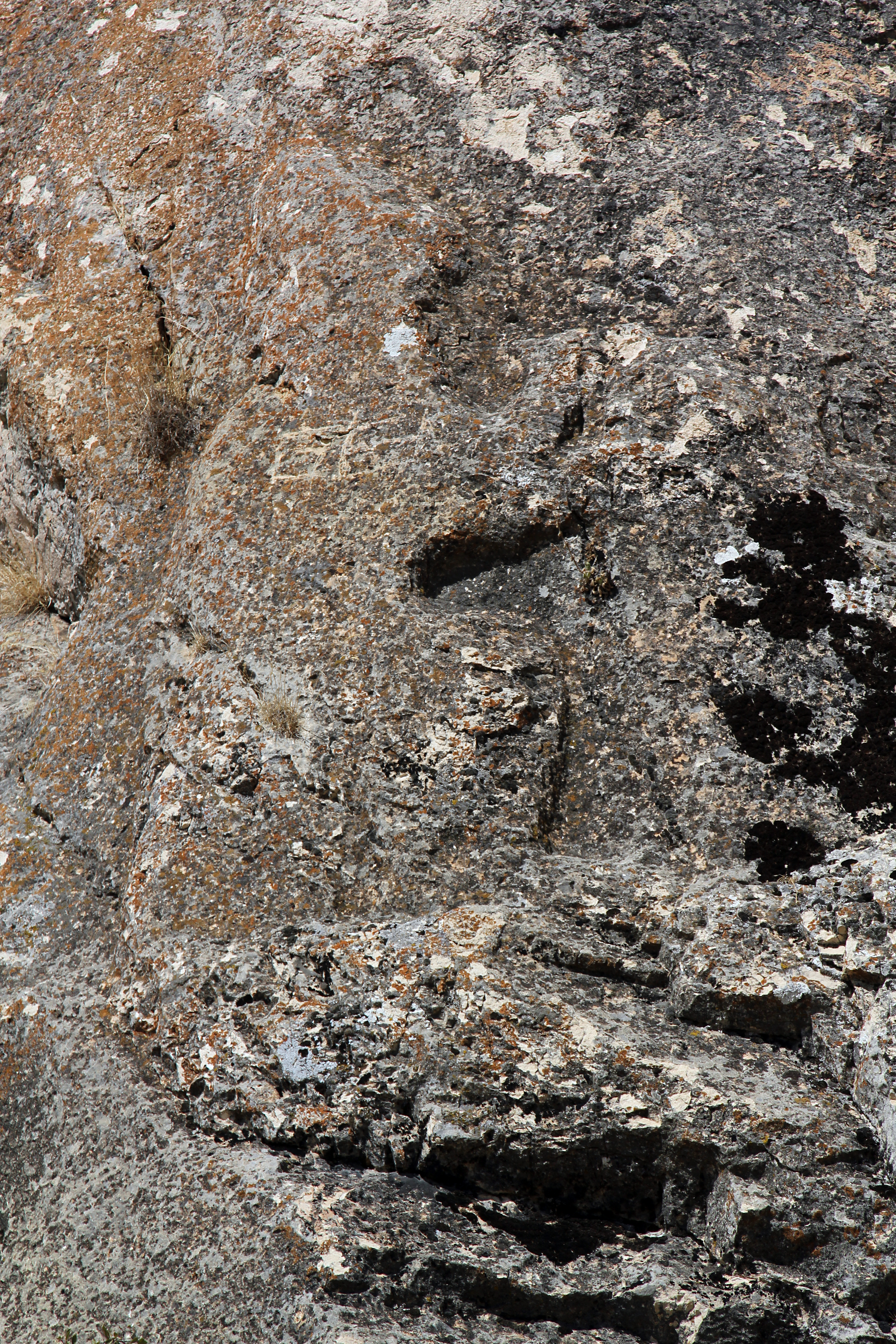
Sitting goddess

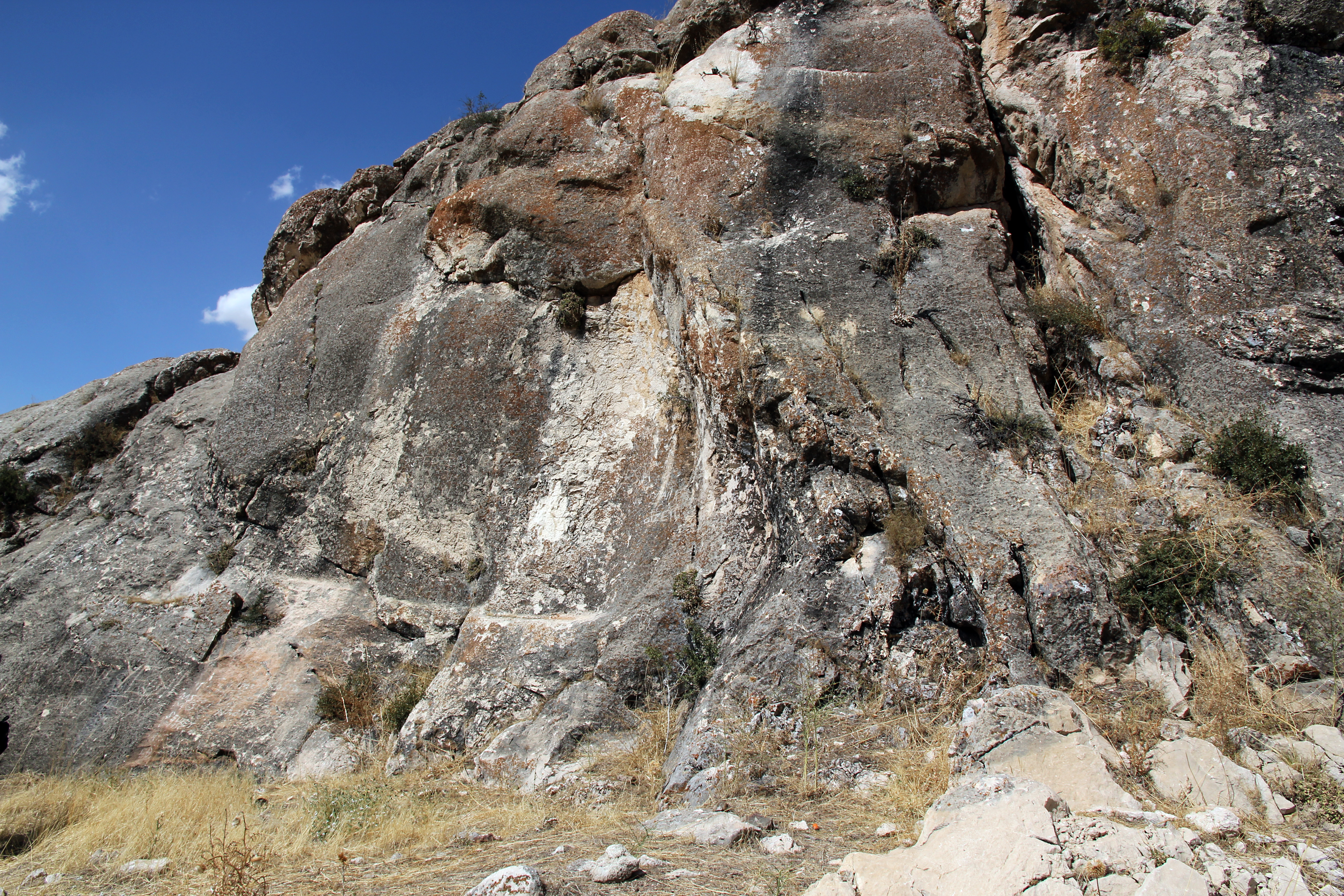
The goddess in the upper right

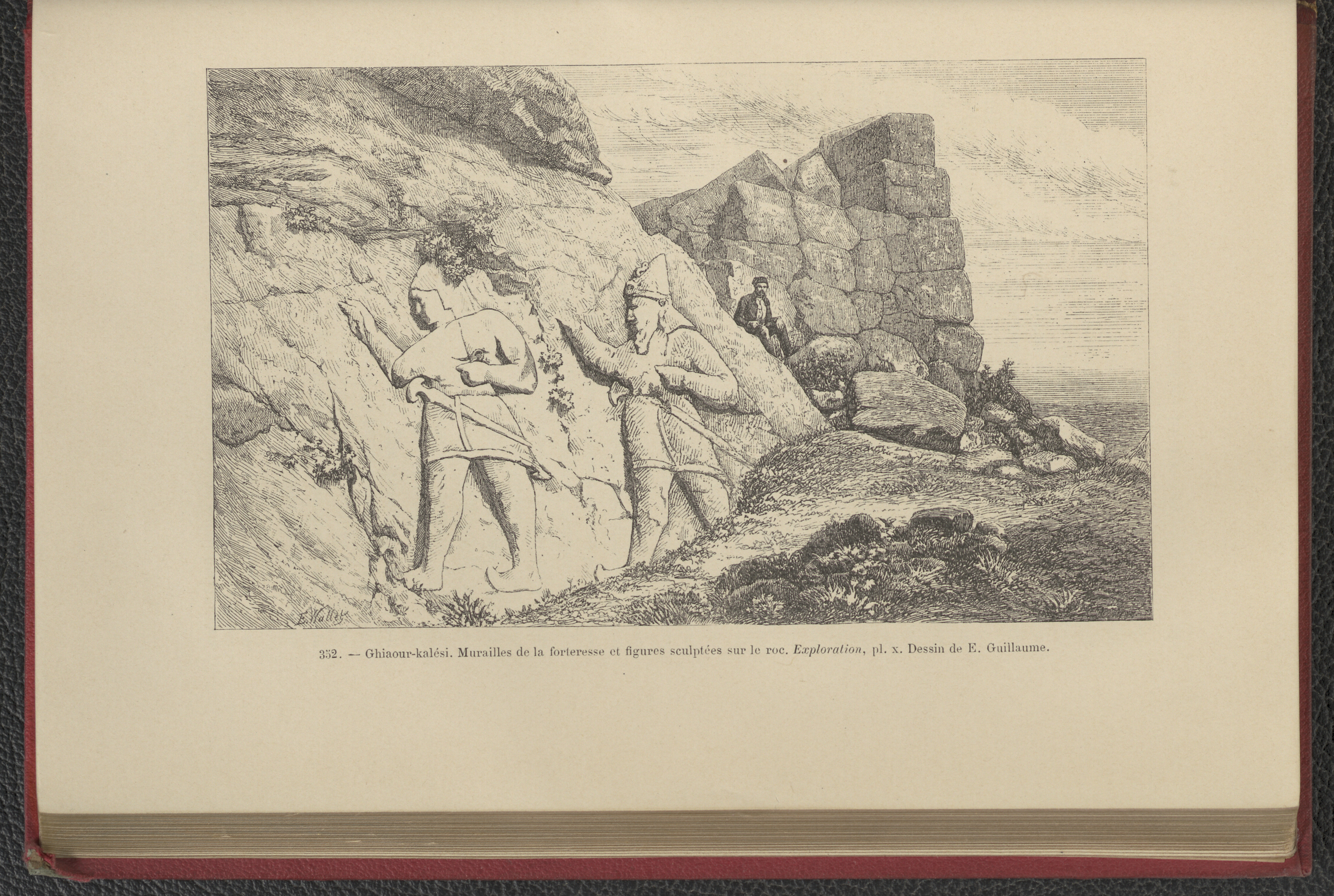
Drawing in Histoire de l'art dans l'antiquité by Georges Perrot (1887)
