= Šamuḫa =

Bronze Age archeological site in Turkey

Samuha
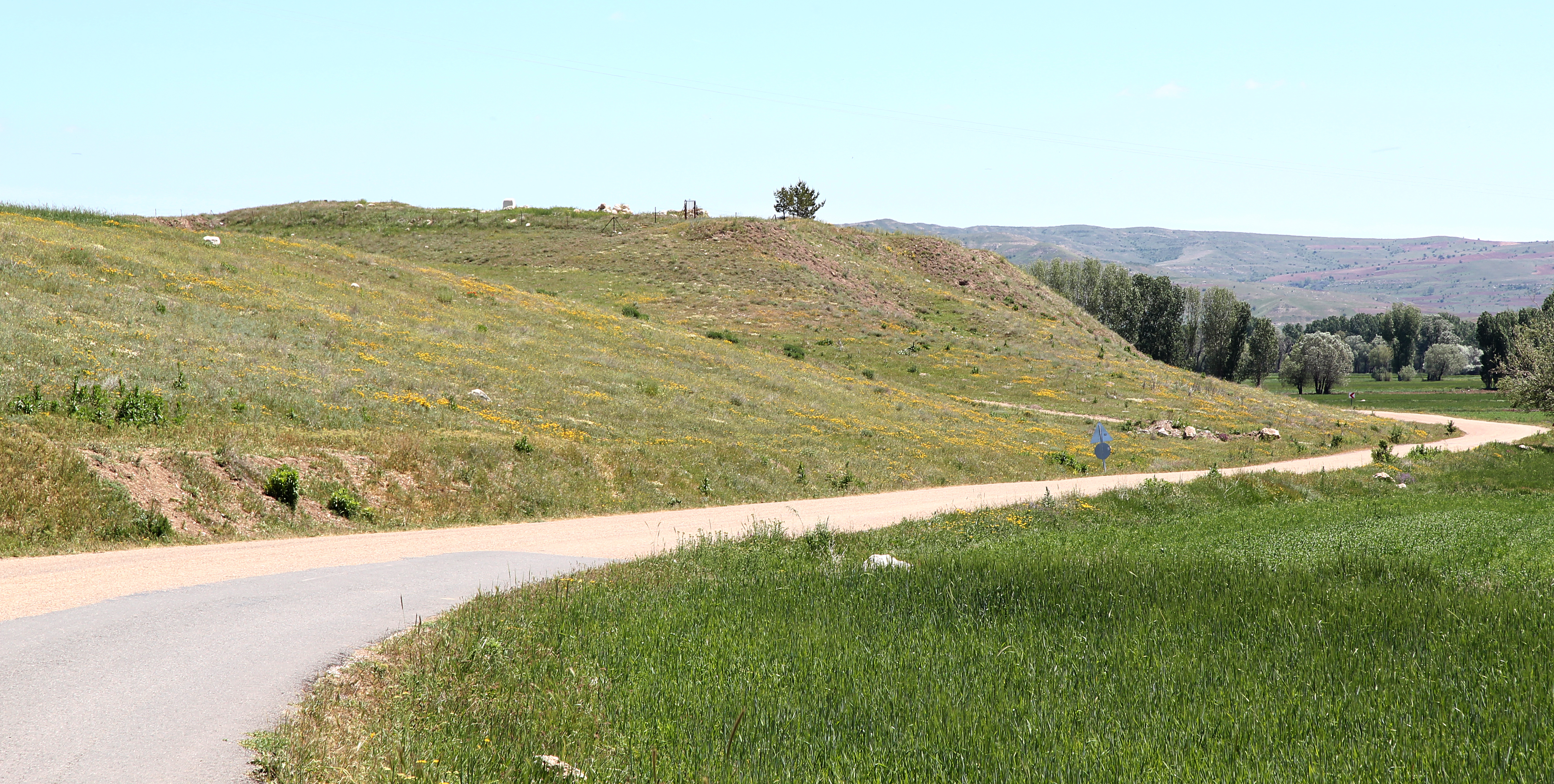
- Settlement mound as seen from the west

- Location within Turkey
- 39°37′10″N 36°31′41″E
- Type: Settlement
- Cultures: Hittite
- Location: Sivas Province, Turkey
- Region: Anatolia

Site notes
- Condition: In ruins

Šamuḫa is an ancient Bronze Age settlement. It was a city of the Hittites, a religious centre and, for a few years, a military capital for the empire. It has been proposed to have been at a site near the village of Kayalıpınar, Yıldızeli, c. 40 km west of Sivas, in the Sivas Province of Turkey. It is located on the northern bank of the Kizil Irmak river, which was called Marassanta by the Hittites and Halys during the classical era. Samuha's faith was syncretistic. Rene Lebrun in 1976 called Samuha the "religious foyer of the Hittite Empire".

== History ==
=== Middle Bronze ===
==== Assyrian Trading Colony ====
Map of ancient Anatolia during the Karum period, showing the location of Samuha

Excavations revealed that the town was already inhabited during the ancient Assyrian trading colonies period (Karum period). Two residences (House of Tamura and House of Tatali) have been excavated. This period ended with the big fire in the settlement.

==== Hittite Old Kingdom ====
After the Karum period city was destroyed, the Hittites built a new city with a palace complex.

=== Late Bronze ===
==== Hittite Period ====
Samuha was a primary base of field operations for the Hittites while the Kaskas were plundering the Hatti heartland, including the historic capital Hattusa, during the 14th century BC under kings Tudhaliya I-III and Suppiluliuma I. During this period, the religions of Samuha and Sapinuwa became influenced by the faith of the Hurrians.

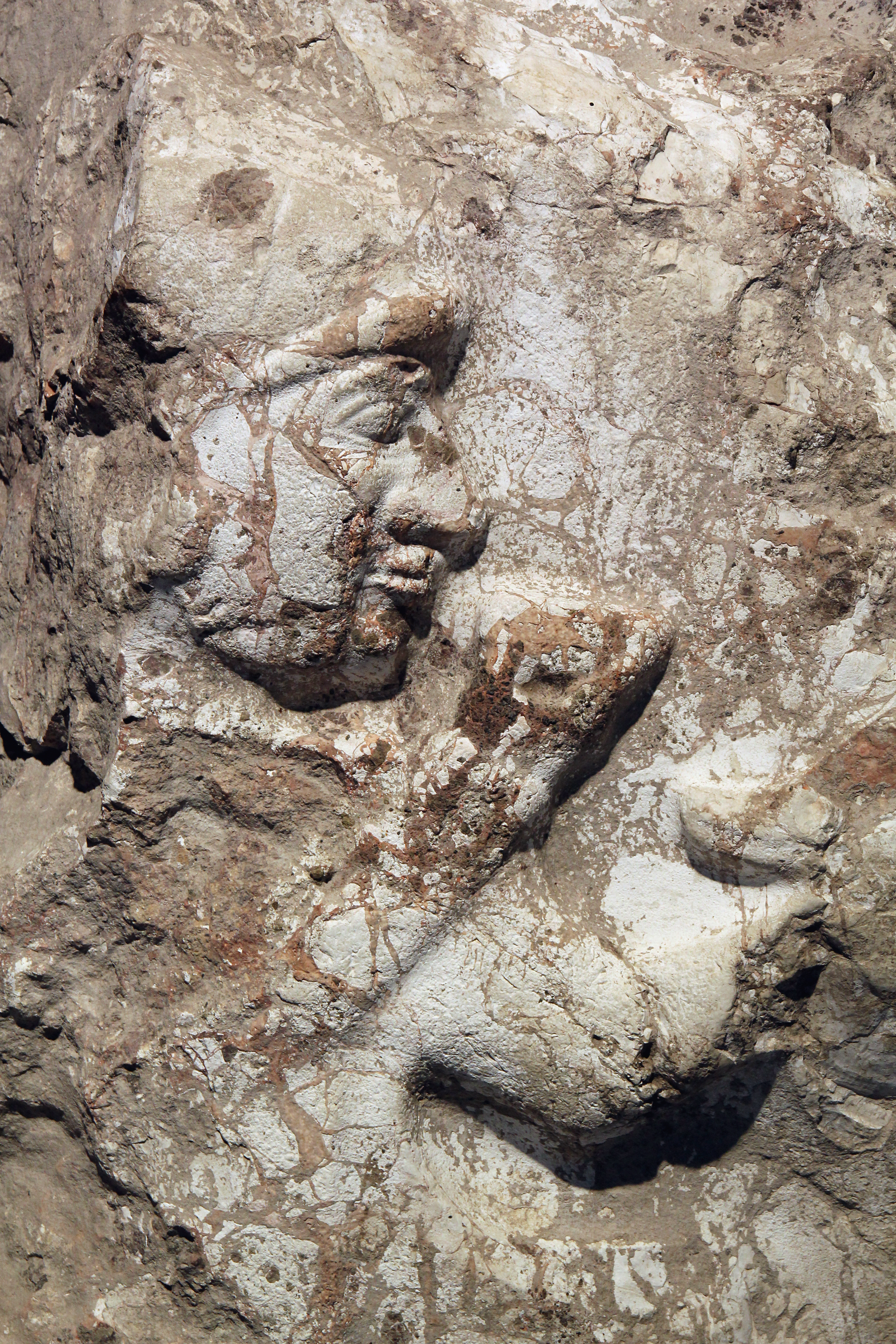
Relief block from 'House A' in Kayalıpınar (detail)

Excavations at Sapinuwa have revealed that at the beginning of this time, Sapinuwa held the archives for the kingdom. Under either Tudhaliya I or Tudhaliya II, Sapinuwa was burnt. Hattusili III later recorded of this time that Azzi had "made Samuha its frontier".

===== Tudhaliya III =====
Samuha then became the base for the reconquests of Tudhaliya III and his then-general Suppiluliuma. The Deeds of Suppiluliuma report that he brought Kaska captives back to Samuha after a campaign toward Hayasa (connected somehow with Azzi) on Tudhaliya's behalf. Tudhaliya III himself centralised the faith of Kizzuwatna to Samuha.

===== Hattusili III =====
Mursili II appointed his youngest son Hattusili III priest of the local goddess, referred to as 'Ishtar of Samuha', identified in scholarship as either Sausga or the similar deity DINGIR.GE_{6} The Hittites of Hattusa worshipped the goddess of Samuha as a protective deity. Samuha was an important cult site of this goddess.

Samuha disappears from the historical record after Hattusili III.

=== After Hittite Period ===
Archaeologists have uncovered remains from the Roman, Early Byzantine, and Medieval periods.

== Location ==
In years past, scholars have been divided on the location of Samuha. Some maintained it was on the banks of the Euphrates river. Others believe it was located on the Halys river, presently called the Kızılırmak River. The Kızılırmak River is closer to Hattusa. Its headwaters are near the city of Sivas, 130 miles (209 km) away. The river flows to the east, south of Hattusa, then turns north to the west of Hattusa, discharging into the Black Sea.

More recently (2021) there's more consensus that Samuha was located in Kayalipinar on the Kizilirmak river. This location is reflected in the coordinates given in this article.

=== Euphrates location theory ===
Hittite records indicate that Samuha was located on a navigable river, which tends to support the Euphrates location. Oliver Gurney notes in the above-cited work that the Halys river is also navigable in sections. He favored the Euphrates location, noting that the Murad Su, the present day Murat River had river traffic in 1866. The Murat river is a tributary of the Euphrates river. Both proposed locations are south of the Kaskian incursion that overtook Hattusa and required the Hittite leadership to move to Samuha.

=== Kayalipinar location ===
Mursili II talks of stopping in Samuha on his way home from the Kaska lands in his Ten Year Annals (KBo 34 iii 45), which would argue strongly against a location on or near the Euphrates. Already in 1959, Gurney and Garstang provided a very extended discussion about how Hittite documents seem to contradict a location for Samuha along the Euphrates, locating it instead along the Kizilirmak near modern Sivas, perhaps at Zara. They further pointed out that the town of Pittiyariga, often mentioned in the same texts as Samuha, which is associated with the upper Euphrates areas, must be further east yet.

As of 2020, excavations by Andreas and Vuslat Müller-Karpe in Kayalıpınar, Yıldızeli have revealed cuneiform archives that strongly connect the site's identity with Samuha.

== Cuneiform texts ==
Numerous important cuneiform texts were found in recent excavations. The first tablet fragment in Kayalıpınar was found in 1999, which prompted more archaeological research on the settlement mound.

There are also two karum period commercial documents written in Old Assyrian.

Already in the first year of renewed excavations in 2005, further fragments of cuneiform tablets were found, which multiplied from year to year. Over a hundred tablets, mainly rituals, festivals, cult inventories and oracles, were found in 2015. The texts found up to 2017 were published in 2019 and given the sigla KpT 1.1-100. Most of the texts are written in Hittite; they often contain Luwian glosses and Hurrian expressions. Seven texts found are in Hurrian language.

The latest excavation found 131 cuneiform tablets and fragments, bringing the total to 184 for the site.

== See also ==
- Sapinuwa
