= Sirkeli, Ceyhan =

Sirkeli
- Neighbourhood
- Location in Turkey
- Coordinates: 36.9969°N 35.7508°E
- Country: Turkey
- Province: Adana
- District: Ceyhan
- Population (2022): 383
- Time zone: UTC+3 (TRT)

Sirkeli is a neighbourhood in the municipality and district of Ceyhan, Adana Province, Turkey. Its population is 383 (2022). It is the site of the tell (settlement mound) of Sirkeli Höyük.

== History ==
=== Late Bronze ===
==== Hittite Period ====
Near the river there is a carving in the rocks of the ancient Hittite king Muwatalli II.
