= Kaskians =

Bronze Age people in Anatolia

The Kaska (also Kaška, later Tabalian Kasku and Gasga) were a loosely affiliated Bronze Age people, who spoke the unclassified Kaskian language and lived in mountainous East Pontic Anatolia, known from Hittite sources. They lived in the mountainous region between the core Hittite region in eastern Anatolia and the Black Sea, and are cited as the reason that the later Hittite Empire never extended northward to that area. They are sometimes identified with the Caucones known from Greek records.

== History ==
The Kaska, probably originating from the eastern shore of the Propontis, may have displaced the speakers of the Palaic language from their homes in Pala.

The Kaska first appear in the Hittite prayer inscriptions that date from the reign of Hantili II, c. 1450 BC, and make references to their movement into the ruins of the holy city of Nerik. During the reign of Hantili's son, Tudhaliya II (c. 1430 BC), "Tudhaliya's 3rd campaign was against the Kaskas." His successor Arnuwanda I composed a prayer for the gods to return Nerik to the empire; he also mentioned Kammama and Zalpuwa as cities which he claimed had been Hittite but which were now under the Kaskas. Arnuwanda attempted to mollify some of the Kaska by offering tribute.

Sometime between the reigns of Arnuwanda and Suppiluliuma I (about 1330 BC), letters found in Maşat Höyük note that locusts ate the Kaskas' grain. The hungry Kaska were able to join with Hayasa-Azzi and Isuwa to the east, as well as other enemies of the Hittites, and burn Hattusa, the Hittite capital, to the ground. They probably also burned the Hittites' secondary capital, Sapinuwa. Suppiluliuma's grandson Hattusili III in the mid-13th century BC wrote of the time before Tudhaliya. He said that in those days the Kaska had "made Nenassa their frontier" and that their allies in Hayasa-Azzi had done the same to Samuha.

In the Amarna letters, Amenhotep III wrote to the Arzawan king Tarhunta-Radu that the "country Hattusa" was obliterated, and further asked Arzawa to send him some of these Kaska people he had heard about. The Hittites also enlisted subject Kaska for their armies. When the Kaska were not raiding or serving as mercenaries, they raised pigs and wove linen, leaving scarcely any imprint on the permanent landscape.

Tudhaliya III and Suppiluliuma I (c. 1375–1350 BC) set up their court in Samuha and invaded Azzi-Hayasa from there. The Kaska intervened, but Suppiluliuma defeated them; after Suppiluliuma had fully pacified the region, Tudhaliya and Suppiluliuma were able to move on Hayasa and defeat it too, despite some devastating guerrilla tactics at their rear. Some twelve tribes of Kaska then united under a leader named Piyapili, but Piyapili was no match for Suppiluliuma. Eventually, Tudhaliya and Suppiluliuma returned Hattusa to the Hittites. But the Kaska continued to be a menace both inside and out and a constant military threat. They are said to have fielded as many as 9,000 warriors and 800 chariots.

In the time of ailing Arnuwanda II (around 1323 BC), the Hittites worried that the Kaskas from Ishupitta within the kingdom to Kammama without might take advantage of the plague in Hatti. The veteran commander Hannutti moved to Ishupitta, but he died there. Ishupitta then seceded from Hatti, and Arnuwanda died too. Arnuwanda's brother and successor Mursili II recorded in his annals that he defeated this rebellion. Over the ongoing decades, the Kaskans were also active in Durmitta and in Tipiya, by Mount Tarikarimu in the land of Ziharriya, and by Mount Asharpaya on the route to Pala; they rebelled and/or performed egregious banditry in each place. At first, Mursili defeated each Kaska uprising piecemeal.

The Kaska united for the first time under Pihhuniya of Tipiya, who "ruled like a king", according to Hittite records. Pihhuniya conquered Istitina and advanced as far as Zazzissa. But Mursili defeated this force and brought Pihhuniya back as a prisoner to Hattusas. Mursili then switched to a defensive strategy, with a chain of border fortresses north to the Devrez. Even so, in the early 13th century, when Mursili's son Muwatalli II was king in Hatti, the Kaskas sacked Hattusa. Muwatalli stopped enlisting Kaska as troops; he moved his capital to Tarhuntassa to the south; and he appointed his brother, the future Hattusili III, as governor over the northern marches. Hattusili defeated the Kaska to the point of recapturing Nerik, and when he took over the kingdom he returned the capital to Hattusa.

The Kaska may have contributed to the fall of the Hittite empire in the Bronze Age collapse, c. 1200 BC. Then they penetrated eastern Anatolia, and continued their thrust southwards, where they encountered the Assyrians. The Assyrian king Tiglath-Pileser I recorded late in the 12th century BC that the Kaska (whom he referred to as "Apishlu") and their Mushki and Urumu (Urumeans) allies were active in what had been the Hatti heartland. Tiglath-Pileser defeated them, and the Kaska then disappear from all historical records.

Repulsed by the Assyrians, a subdivision of the Kaska might have passed north-eastwards to the Caucasus, where they probably blended with the Proto-Colchian or Zan autochthons, forming a polity which was known as the Kolkha to the Urartians and later as the Colchis to the Greeks. Another branch might have established themselves in Cappadocia, which in the 8th century BC became a vassal of Assyria and ruled some Anatolian areas.

According to I. Singer, Kaskians and Hattians are different branches of the same people. However, if the Hattians were assimilated by the Hittites, then the Kaskians were pushed to the periphery of their former territory.
