= Mezulla =

Minor Hittite goddess

Mezulla or Mezzulla was a minor Hittite goddess. She and her daughter Zintuḫi were closely associated with the Sun goddess of Arinna; together they formed a triple deity. Mezulla had only local importance and is not mentioned in the oath lists of Hittite interstate treaties.

== Family ==
Mezulla was the daughter of the Sun goddess of Arinna and the weather god Tarḫunna. Her daughter Zintuḫi was a goddess who had no special role. From the 13th century BC onwards, the corn god Telipinu, the Weather god of Zippalanda and the Weather god of Nerik are attested as her brothers.

== Role ==
Like her mother, Mezulla was of Hattian origin and she was also known as Tappinu (Hattian: "her daughter"). As the daughter of the two chief Hittite deities, she could be called upon to act as an intermediary with either of them, especially their mother. She also aided military campaigns.

Mezulla had a temple in the holy city of Arinna, which was the second most important in the city after that of her mother. No other temples of Mezulla are known, but worship of her is also attested in Ḫattuša, Taḫurpa, and other north Hittite cities. Like her mother she could also be worshipped in the form of a silver solar disc.

== Zintuḫi ==
Zintuḫi, whose name is Hattian for "granddaughter", was worshipped along with her mother and grandmother. Like her mother, she could be invoked as an intermediary with the Sun goddess of Arinna. Queen Puduḫepa mentions her with the unclear epithet "Clothes pin on her breast." She had her own temple in Arinna, but she was not otherwise worshipped separately from the Sun goddess of Arinna.

== Bibliography ==
- Maciej Popko: Arinna. Eine heilige Stadt der Hethiter. (Studien zu den Boğazköy-Texten, Vol. 50). Wiesbaden 2009, ISBN 978-3-447-05867-4.
- Volkert Haas: Geschichte der hethitischen Religion. (Handbuch der Orientalistik, Part. 1, Vol. 15). Brill, Leiden/ New York/ Köln 1994, ISBN 90-04-09799-6.
