= Hittite music =

Music of the Hittite people

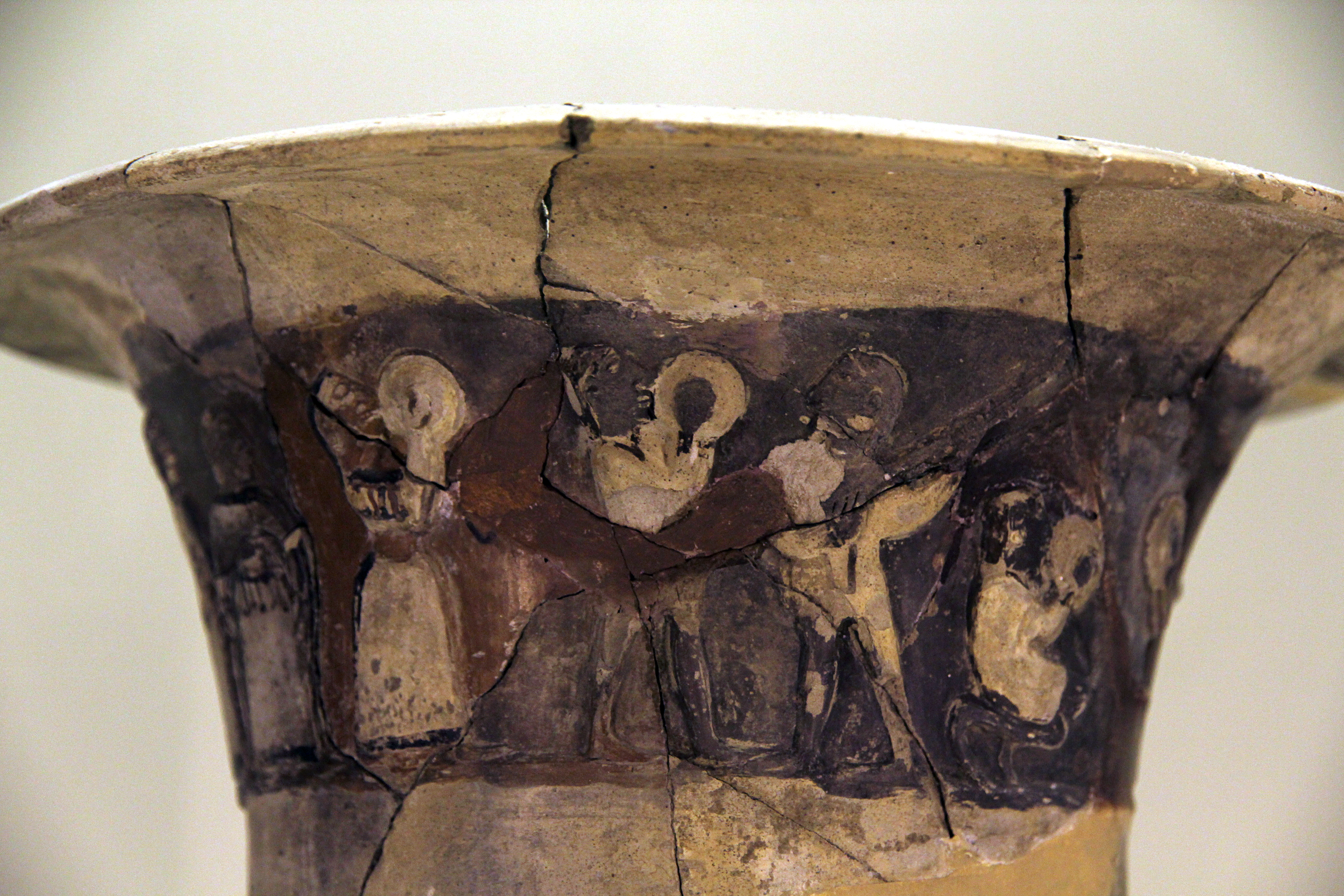
Dancers and musicians on one of the Hüseyindede vases (ca. 16/15th century BC). From left to right: a dancer, then a man and a woman with cymbals, then a lute-player, and finally two dancers with cymbals in their hands.

Hittite music is the music of the Hittites of the 17th–12th century BC and of the Syro-Hittite successor states of the 12th–7th century BC.

Understanding of Hittite music is based on archaeological finds and literary source material. Hittite texts mainly describe the use of music in religious contexts. The basic musical elements were instrumental music and singing, as well as shouting and other noises, like clapping. Because of the small amount of evidence, Hittite music is poorly understood compared to Mesopotamian and Egyptian music of the same period.

== Cultural and chronological variation ==
The inhabitants of the Hittite empire did not belong to a single ethnicity. The north, up to the Black Sea, was inhabited by the Hatti, which had a large influence on Hittite culture. Their language, Hattian, was regularly used in Hittite religious rituals. The Luwians, who were closely related to the Hittites, lived in southern Anatolia, and it seems that the horn played a particularly important role in their religious rituals. Several song introductions in the Luwian language are transmitted in Hittite texts. Influence from the Hurrians who lived to the east of the Hittites only came relatively late. In the later period of the Hittite empire, they had a great influence on the Hittite mythology. The oldest complete piece of musical notation is a Hurrian hymn from Ugarit.

Hittite musical history can be divided into three periods. The oldest evidence from Anatolia is archaeological finds of noise-makers which are classified as pre-Hittite. The best understood period is the music of the Hittite empire. After the fall of the empire around 1180 BC, there were several small Syro-Hittite principalities in southeastern Anatolia and Syria. The Luwian texts from this period provide no information about music, but several sculpted relief scenes contain detailed depictions of musicians, alongside various other scenes of daily life. With the final conquest of these states by the Assyrians in the 7th century BC, evidence for Hittite culture and thus Hittite music disappears.

== Evidence ==
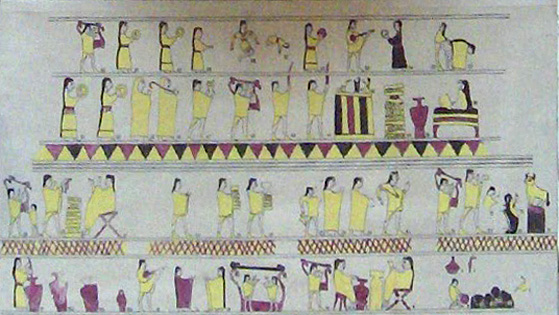
İnandık vase, (17–16th century BC), with various ritual and musical scenes. In the bottom frieze, a man plays a large lyre, and another musician to the right plays a smaller one. In addition, lute-players, women with cymbals, and dancers performing somersaults are shown.

The textual evidence for Hittite music comes mainly from Bronze Age archives of the Hittite capital Hattusa. These texts in Hittite cuneiform deal mainly with music for religious contexts. The texts provide detailed information on when singing, recitation, or dancing should occur in a ritual, which musical instruments should be used and who should play them, as well as when no music should be played. Unlike Mesopotamia and Egypt, there are no known texts on music theory.

The little archaeological evidence that there is consists largely of depictions on ritual vessels and on stone reliefs. Musical instruments or their components are rarely recovered, in comparison with the situation in Mesopotamia and Egypt. Some relatively well-preserved noise-makers, such as rattles, clash cymbals and sistrums have been recovered from pre-Hittite times. Cult vases from the early Hittite period, such as the İnandık vase, the Bitik vase, and the Hüseyindede vases have depictions of people playing music, often accompanied by acrobats and sacrifices.

From the late Hittite period there are several stone reliefs with musical groups, often accompanied by jugglers, such as those from Carchemish, Kahramanmaraş, Sam'al, and Karatepe. They show Mesopotamian influences. At Karatepe, Greek elements have also been detected. An 8th century orthostat from that site is the oldest known depiction of an aulos player with a mouth strap (Ancient Greek: φορβειά, romanized: phorbeiá).

== Instruments ==
Hittite texts mention many musical instruments, not all of which can be certainly identified. A problem for understanding the Hittite names for musical instruments lies in the fact that no bilingual texts or word lists which deal with music are known to us. Even many of the Akkadian terms for musical instruments are not yet entirely certainly understood. Names of Hittite musical instruments may be transmitted to us in Hittite, Luwian or Hattian languages. Yet others are recorded in Sumerograms, so their actual Hittite names are not known to us.

For understanding how instruments it can be helpful to know whether an instrument was blown (Hitt. paripariya-), plucked (Hitt. ḫazzikk- or ḫazzišk-), or drummed (Hitt. walḫ-) – the last two terms were used for noisemakers, percussion instruments, and string instruments; the first term only for wind instruments. Rarely there is other information on the construction of the instrument which can enable a clearer identification. A final method of identifying named instruments is the relative frequency of references to the instrument in texts and imagery.

=== Lyre ===
The lyre (Hittite: zinar; Summerogram: ^{GIŠ.d}INANNA 'Ishtar-Instrument' after the Mesopotamian goddess Ishtar) is the best attested musical instrument. The textual and archaeological evidence distinguishes between small and large lyres. The two kinds of lyre could be played one after the other, but probably never at the same time. Lyres were played by musicians and cult-singers – in texts, the only named lyre players are women.

The large standing lyre (Hittite: ḫunzinar; Sumerogramm: ^{GIŠ.d}INANNA.GAL 'large Ishtar instrument') was about two metres high and is shown in art as being played by two men simultaneously. The number of strings is not certain. They often appear in cult texts, usually accompanied by singing or played along with a drum or other instruments. It is possible that the sound box was also used as a percussion instrument.

The small lyre (Hittite: ippizinar; Sumerogramm: ^{GIŠ.d}INANNA.TUR 'small Ishtar-instrument) had around ten strings and was played during drinking ceremonies by cult-singers, usually on its own, without any accompaniment. It was seldom held or played by a man.

Like other cult and temple equipment, lyres could be worshipped as divine. Sacred lyres were anointed and given offerings of drink and food. Since some texts refer to the "sweet news of the lyre", it is possible that the lyre was considered to be an intermediary between the offers of a sacrifice and the deity receiving the offering.

The oldest depictions of lyres in Anatolia and North Syria come from the first half of the third millennium BC (Oylum Höyük, Carchemesh, Urkesh). There are images from the second millennium BC from Kültepe, Tarsus, and Mardin. All of these early depictions come from cylinder seals, whose small size means that few details can be made out beyond their five or six strings.

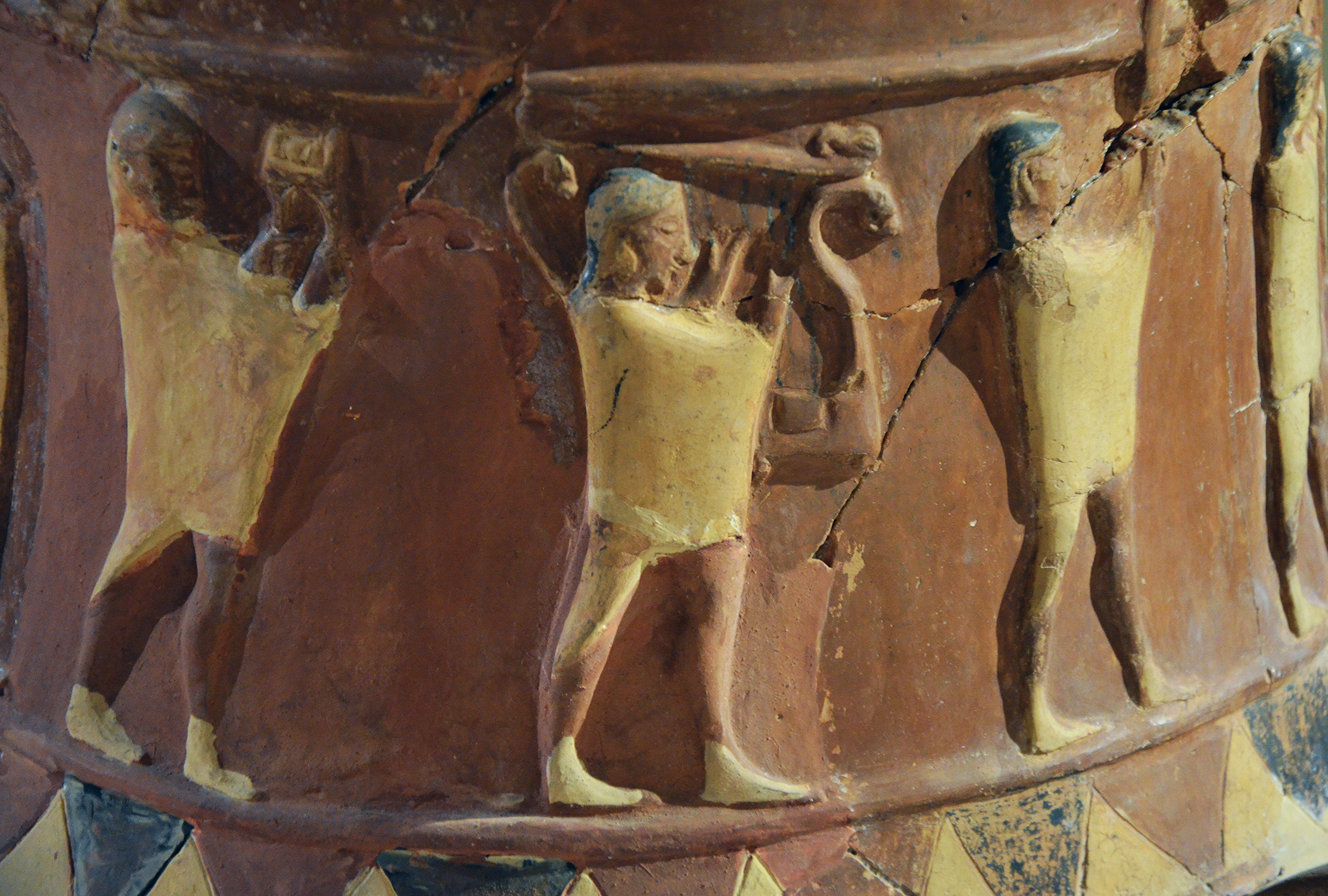
Small lyre on the İnandiık vase

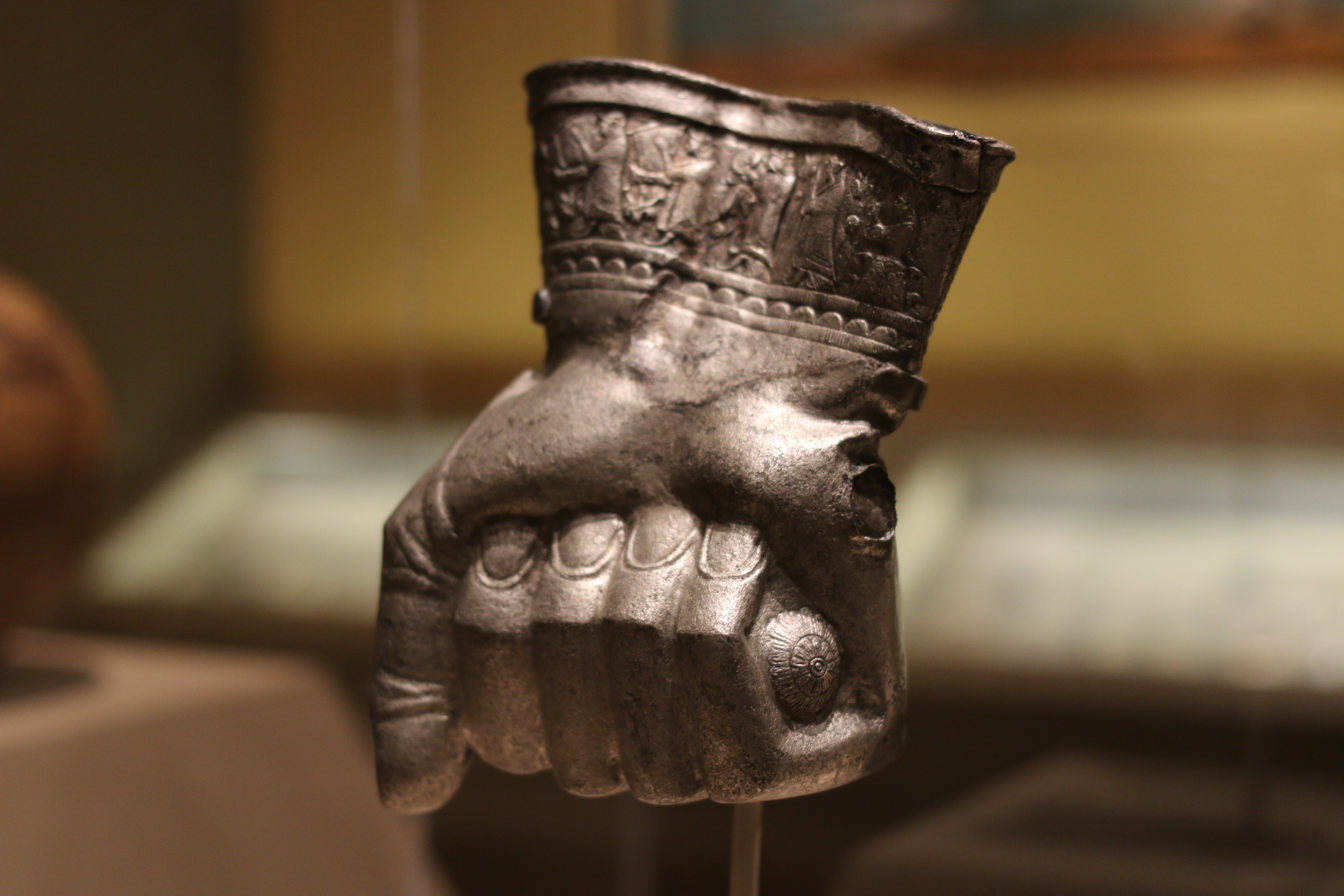
Lyres on the Boston Fist

The lyres on the İnandık vase are asymmetrical. They have a square sound box and two arms shaped like a swan's neck which terminate in the heads of an unidentifiable animal. The cross-bar is attached to the arms and itself terminates in animal heads at both ends. The seven strings were fastened to the sound box with a tailpiece. It is not clear how the strings were tuned. The Boston Fist, a Hittite drinking vessel in the shape of a fist, with a depiction of an offering scene for the weather god has two asymmetrical box lyres, which are not decorated.

Bird and animal head decoration are also found on lyres from the Aegean, like the lyre-players in the Mycenaean palace at Pylos and in Ancient Egypt, where the lyre first appeared around 2000 BC. In Mesopotamia, on the other hand, the sound boxes of lyres were often depicted as reclining bulls or with the protome of a bull.

In Late Hittite reliefs, only hand lyres are depicted, which take various forms and are different from the Old Hittite lyres. At Karatepe there is a depiction of a lyre which bears a striking resemblance to the ancient Greek phorminx.

=== Lute ===
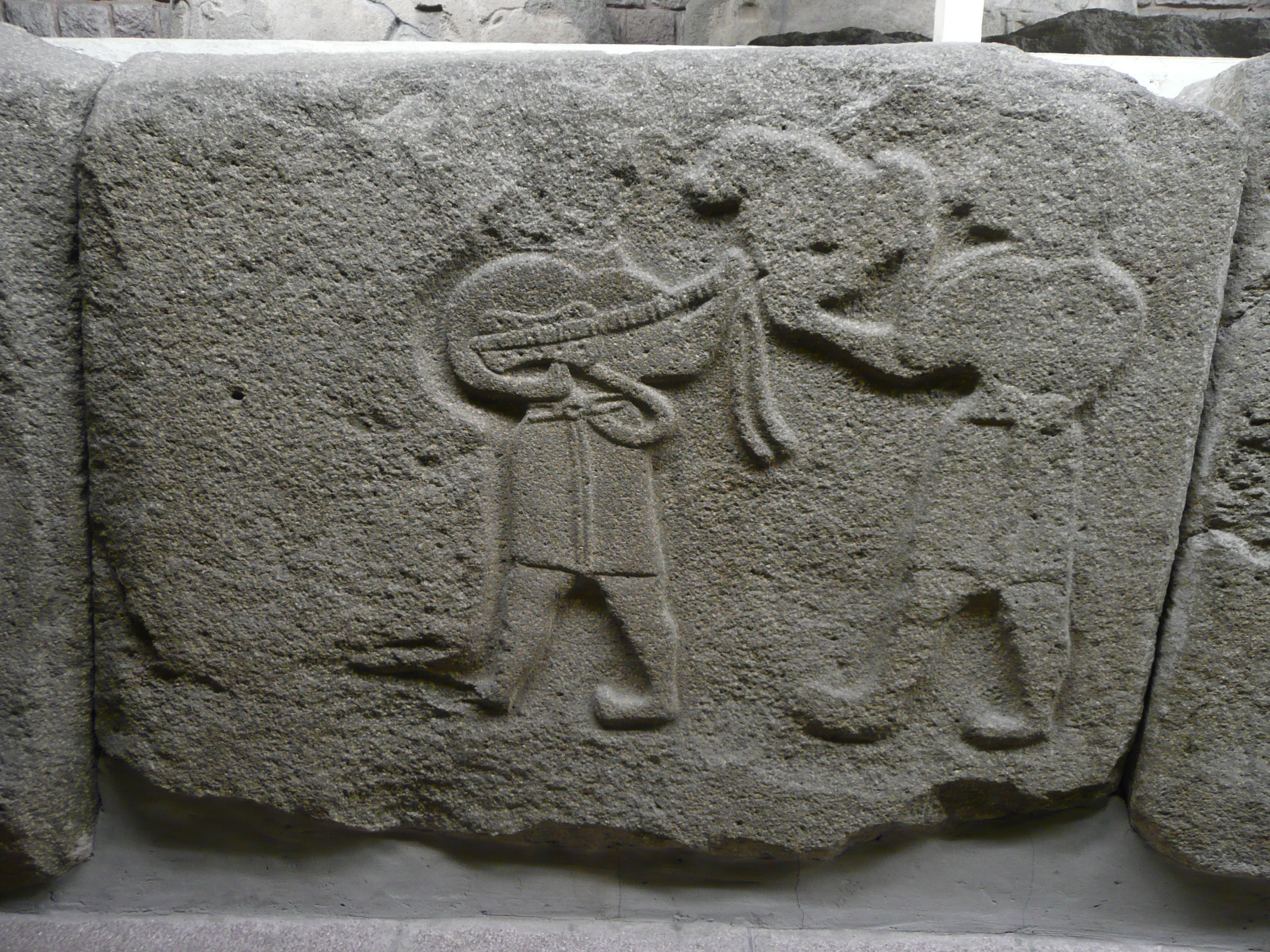
Lute player from Alaca Höyük

The long-necked lute (Sumerogram: ^{GIŠ}TIBULA – the traditional Hittological transcription of the Akkadian tigidlû) is also well-attested and could be played alone or accompanied by singing or dancing. In Hittite rituals, the lute played an important role along with the lyre, which was very much unlike the situation in Mesopotamia and Egypt, where the lute only appeared at the beginning of the 18th dynasty.

The meaning of the Akkadian word tigidlû used to be unknown, but it was revealed by a word list from Emar that there was a three-stringed tigidlû instrument, which suggests a lute, and the reference to a "traveling tigidlû" in this list fits well with a lute.

Based on artistic depictions, the Hittites used lutes with relatively small sound boxes and long fingerboards, which resemble the Pandura later used by the Greeks and Romans. Lutes were also known in Mesopotamia and Egypt. There, a pumpkin or other gourd was covered with a resonance board, with a long rod which served as the fingerboard. This fingerboard might be fretted and have two or three strings.

The earliest depiction of a long-necked lute in Anatolia is on a cup from Samsat (Layer XIII, 17th century BC), which shows a man with a particularly broad triangular torso, holding a long-necked lute with a round soundbox. No details can be discerned.

In Hittite depictions, the lutist hold the relatively small soundbox in the curve of their right elbow. The strings were strummed with the right hand or with a plectrum that was tied to the instrument with a string. The fretted fingerboard was held up with the left hand. The number of strings is not absolutely clear, but may have been either two or three.

The lutes in artistic depictions are built in a number of different ways. The clearly recognisable lutes on the İnandık vase have an oval soundbox with six sound holes. The lute on the Sphinx Gate at Alaca Höyük on the other hand has an octagonal soundbox with ten small sound holes, which is often referred to in general works as the earliest image of a guitar. While the strings with which the strings were tied to the head of the fingerboard were often left hanging loose in the Bronze Age, in Late Hittite times, they were tied to long cords which hung down and were tied to a knot underneath, as was also the case in contemporary Mesopotamian lutes.

=== Harps ===
The harp has not been identified in literary sources. Artistic depictions which might depict a harp, are very rare and only survive in fragmentary form. This starkly contrasts with the situation in Mesopotamia, where harps were the most important instrument, especially in ritual.

=== Horn ===
The horn (Hittite šawetra, Luwian šawatar) was shaped like a bull's horn, according to a Late Hittite relief from Carchemesh (9th century BC). The same word was also used for a drinking horn, but never for the horn of an actual animal. It was particularly used in Luwian rituals and could be played by a bugler or a drummer. In the cult of Ištanuwa, the same horn was used as a libation vessel and as a musical instrument. Due to its limited tonal range, it was used mainly to give signals rather than play melodies.

=== Woodwind instrument ===
Woodwind instruments (Sumerogram: GI.GÍD "long tube") are also mentioned in Hittite texts. Since there are no Bronze Age depictions of woodwinds, it is not clear whether this instrument was a reed instrument or a flute. Monika Schuol considers a 'double oboe' most likely for musicological reasons. The woodwind instrument was particularly associated with thecult of the mountain god Ḫulla, which was part of the originally Hattian cult of the town of Arinna. The woodwind could be accompanied by singing and the player might double as a singer.

In Late Hittite reliefs, many musicians are depicted with a double wind instrument which looks a bit like a Greek aulos. A striking example is the musician at Karatepe, who wears a mouth band (8th century BC). A poorly preserved relief from Gaziantep (8th century BC) appears to depict a syrinx player.

=== Drum ===
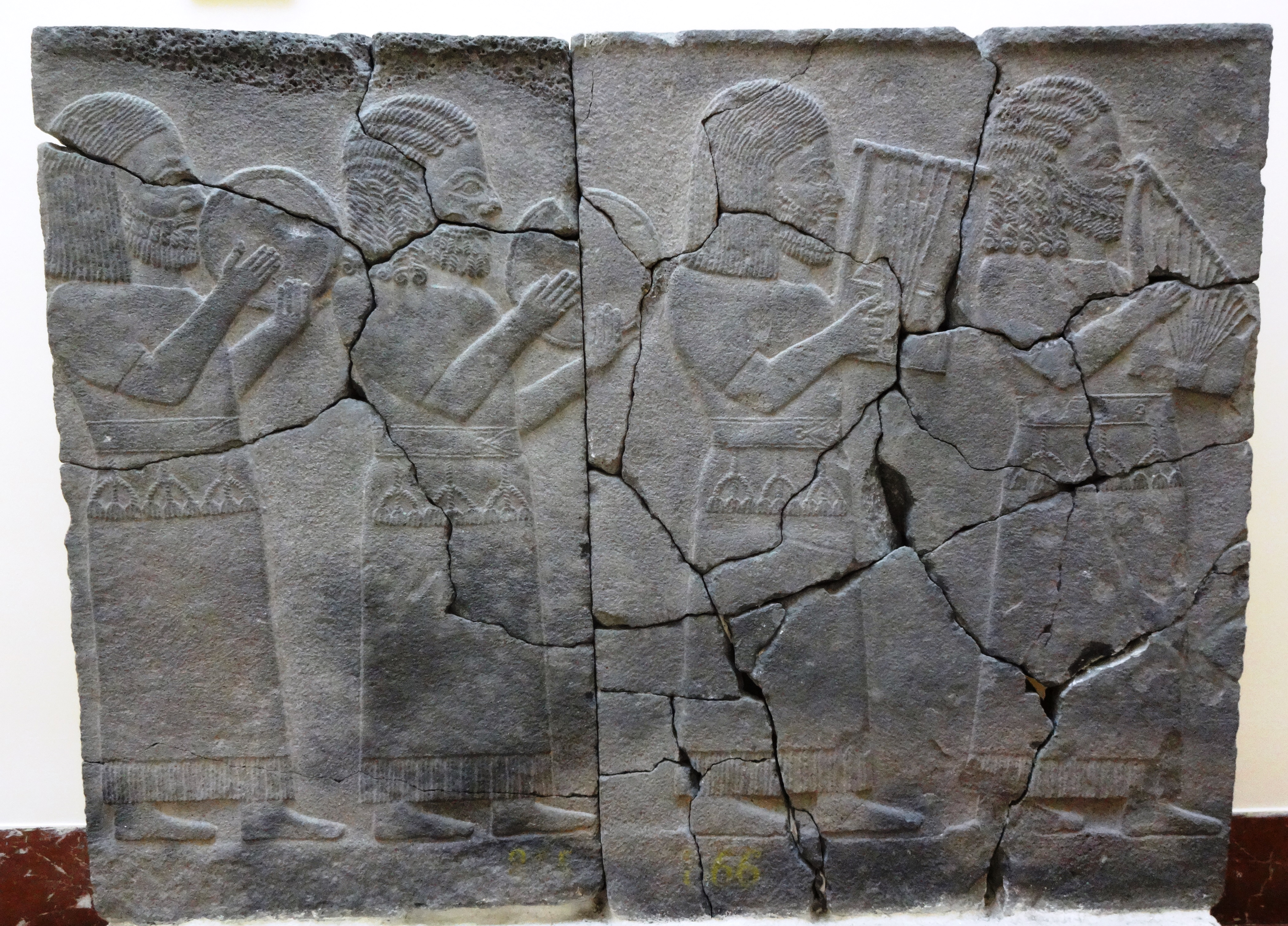
Group of musicians from Karatepe (9th century BC): two men playing the frame drum and two lyre-players

Drums (Hittite arkammi-; Sumerogram: ^{GIŠ}BALAG.DI) were often used at the beginnings of musical pieces and to accompany dancing, where different kinds of drum were apparently not distinguished. They were played by both male and female musicians, who would also sing or blow the horn as required.

A Late Hittite relief from Carchemesh (9th century BC) shows a drum with a diameter of about a meter, carried and played by two men with shoulder-straps, while a third man whose role is not clear stands behind the drum. Reliefs from Zincirli (8th century BC) show men holding frame drums in their left hands and beating them with their right hands.

=== Cymbals ===
Cymbals are first attested archaeologically in the early Bronze Age (3rd millennium BC) at Alaca Höyük, Horoztepe and other locations. Cymbals have also been found at karum-period Kültepe (18th century BC). A pair of cymbals with a diameter of 8.5 cm was found in the wreckage of the Uluburun shipwreck (14th century BC).

In artistic depictions, cymbals are often hard to distinguish from frame drums. A Hittite offering vessel in the shape of a fist (the 'Boston fist') shows an offering ceremony for the Weather god, in which a musician plays a pair of cymbals which are tied together with a string. Generally cymbals are depicted being played by women, generally in pairs, and often accompanied by acrobats or other musicians.

The ^{GIŠ}ḫuḫupal instrument could be beaten and struck, and also served as a libation vessel in offering rituals, which makes an identification difficult, but it may have been a cymbal. The ḫuḫupal could be played alongside the lyre. In the city of Ištanuwa, the Luwian dancing god Tarwaliya was honoured with the ḫuḫupal. An account of a ritual from this city includes the use of the ḫuḫupal for libations of wine.

The ^{URUDU}galgalturi instrument was made from metal, wood, or clay and was played as part of a pair, so it was probably also a cymbal.

ḫuḫupal and galgalturi instruments were often played along with arkammi drums. These three instruments were closely associated with the goddess Šauška. In the Hurrian myth of Ḫedammu, Šauška and her servants Ninatta and Kulitta bewitch the sea-dragon Ḫedammu by playing the arkammi, ḫuḫupal, and galgaturi instruments. The Night Goddess of Samuha, a form of Šauška, received a pair of bronze cymbals, a pair of boxwood or ivory ḫuḫupal instruments, and a drum, as an offering.

=== Other percussion instruments ===
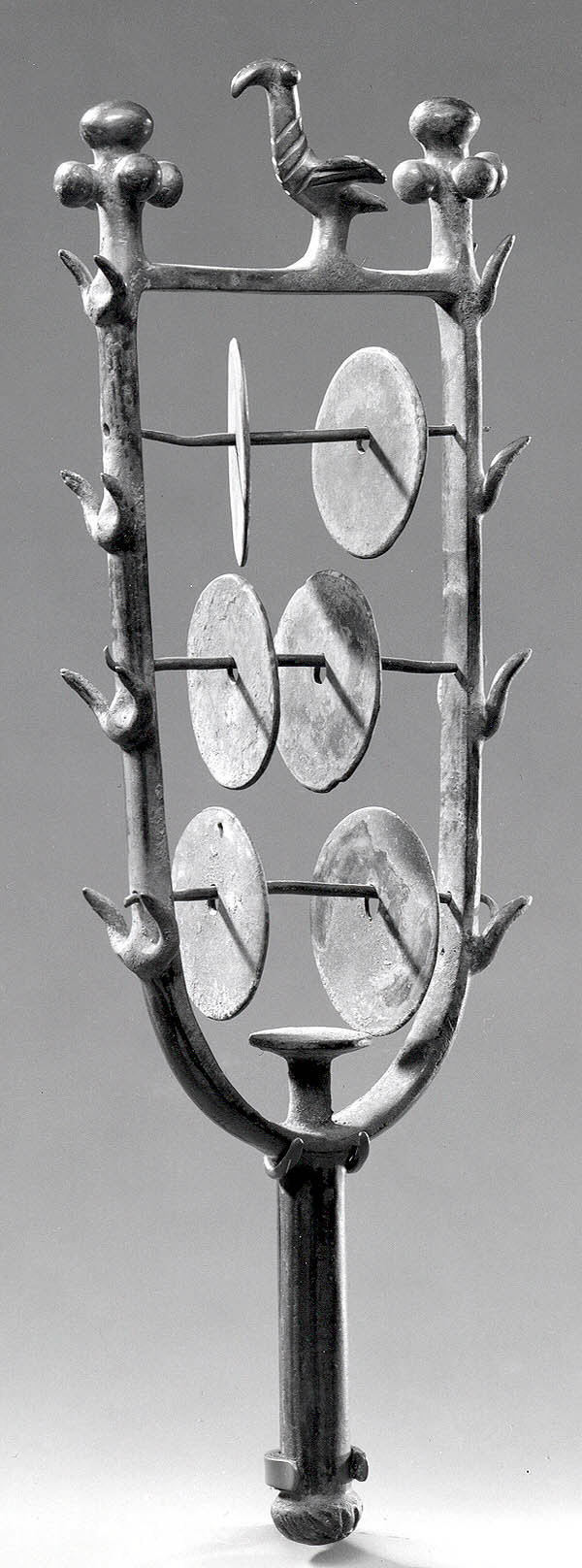
Pre-Hittite sistrum from Horoztepe, 3rd millennium BC.

Sistrums are archaeologically attested from the early Bronze Age (3rd millennium BC). They consist of a U or V-shaped frame with three crossbars, which each hold two metal plates. There are two well-preserved sistrums from Horoztepe, which are decorated with birds, cattle, deer, and other animals.

A late Hittite relief from Karkemesh shows a young man holding a kind of rattle or claves in his hand.

There was also an instrument called the ^{GIŠ}mukar, which may have been a sistrum, rattle, or some other percussion instrument. A textual reference seems to indicate that it consisted of several rods. The mukar was also employed in protective and apotropaic magic. In the Hattian cult of Nerik, the Weather god of Nerik was invoked using a mukar. The instrument was also used by the "man of the Weather god of Zippalanda".

=== Spears ===
A unique feature of Hittite music was the men of the Hattian city of Anunuwa. These men participated in special events, including the KI.LAM festival in Hattusa, at which they beat their spears (Hitt. marit) rhythmically against one another and sang songs in the Hittite language. At another event, the men of Anunuwa beat their lances rhythmically in time to a lyre played by the 'Man of the Protective god'.

=== Clapping ===
The meaning of the Hittite verb palwai- and the personal description palwatalla is uncertain. Either "clapper" or "reciter / psalmist" are possible based on the general context, and a combination of clapping and recitation is also conceivable. Since other words for 'speaking', 'calling' and 'reciting' are known in Hittite, it has also been proposed that the word means 'rhythmic speech', which might be a hint at a kind of ritual Sprechgesang.

== Bibliography ==
- Enrico Badalì. Strumenti musicali, musici e musica nella celebrazione delle feste ittite. Winter, Heidelberg 1991.
- Stefano de Martino. "Music, Dance and Processions in Hittite Anatolia." In Jack M. Sasson (ed.): Civilizations of Ancient Near East. Scribner, New York; Simon & Schuster and Prentice-Hall International, London 1995, pp. 2661–2669.
- Stefano de Martino. Musik. Bei den Hethitern. In Reallexikon der Assyriologie (RdA). Vol. 8, 1997, pp. 483–488.
- Monika Schuol. Hethitische Kultmusik. Eine Untersuchung der Instrumental- und Vokalmusik anhand hethitischer Ritualtexte und von archäologischen Zeugnissen (= Orient-Archäologie. Vol. 14). Verlag Marie Leidorf, Rahden/Westf. 2004, ISBN 3-89646-644-5.
