= Aruna (Hittite mythology) =

Hittite sea god

- God of the sea
- Major cult center: Ḫubešna, Tuwanuwa

Genealogy
- Parents: Kamrušepa (mother)
- Children: Ḫatepuna

Equivalents
- Hurrian: Kiaše

Aruna was the god of the sea in Hittite religion. His name is identical with the Hittite word for the sea, which could also refer to bodies of water, treated as numina rather than personified deities. His worship was not widespread, and most of the known attestations of it come exclusively from the southeast of Anatolia. He was celebrated in cities such as Ḫubešna and Tuwanuwa.

While most myths about the sea found in Hititte archives have Hurrian background, compositions involving Aruna are nonetheless known. The best known example is Telipinu and the Daughter of the Sea God, where he kidnaps the Sun god of Heaven, prompting Tarḫunna to send his son Telipinu to his abode. Out of fear Aruna offers him his daughter, possibly to be identified as the goddess Ḫatepuna, as a bride. Later he demands a bride price, which Telepinu's father agrees to pay. The composition of the myth is not preserved. Aruna and the sun god also appear together in the myth of Ḫaḫḫima, though here he tries to save the latter, rather than kidnap him.

== Name and character ==
Aruna was the Hittite sea god. The word aruna means sea in Hittite, though according to Gernot Wilhelm it is possible that it was a loan from Hattic, as no plausible Indo-European etymology has been identified for it so far. The view that it originates in a pre-Indo-European language is also considered plausible by Rostislav Oreshko.

The sea and the deity representing it only had a marginal role in Hittite religion. Most of the available evidence comes from southeastern Anatolia or from Zalpa in the north. While there is no direct evidence for a distinct cult of a sea deity in central Anatolia, Volkert Haas proposed such a tradition might have also existed in this area based on the discovery of literary texts involving Aruna which originated there.

In addition to references to the personified sea deity, the worship of non-personified sea as a numen is also attested in Hittite sources. In the latter case, the name was written in cuneiform without the "divine determinative" (dingir), a sign used to designate theonyms. Two distinct bodies of water are attested in religious texts, the "Great Sea", to be identified with the Mediterranean Sea, and the tarmana sea, possibly the Gulf of Iskenderun. Iyaya, a spring goddess, played a role in rites pertaining to both of them. Non-personified sea is also present among divine witnesses in Hittite treaties. Most likely the Mediterranean was meant in this case.

== Worship ==
In a ritual from the Middle Hittite period dedicated to the goddess Ḫuwaššanna, Aruna appears alongside Anna, Zarniza and Šarmamma. Collectively they were referred to with the term ḫantezziuš DINGIR^{MEŠ}, which according to Piotr Taracha designated them as primordial deities. This group was worshiped in Ḫubešna (modern Ereğli).

A festival involving Aruna, as well as Ḫudumana (or Ḫurdumana; otherwise unattested) and a deity designated by the logogram IŠTAR (Shaushka in Gary Beckman's translation), was celebrated in the city of Tuwanuwa, corresponding to later Tyana, located in the proximity of modern Bor. He received offerings of offal during it.

Queen Puduḫepa made a vow to the sea at Izziya (modern Kinet Hüyük), promising to deliver it sacrifices in exchange for delivering a certain Piyamaradu, presumed to be a warlord from western Anatolia. No other similar votive texts dedicated to the sea are known. The word is written in this text with a logogram, A.AB.BA, and without the divine determinative, but Ian Rutherford nonetheless presumes that a connection with the worship of Aruna in nearby Tuwanuwa is possible. He suggests that Piyamardu might have originated in Ahhiyawa, and that perhaps the Hittites saw the god of the sea as possessing a unique connection to this land. He also makes a tentative connection with the numerous attestations of Poseidon in Mycenean texts.

A "ritual of the sea" (A-NA ZAG a-ru-na-aš; CTH 436) performed by kings after return from a military campaign was supposed to affirm the continuity of the borders of their domain and eliminate impurity. Most likely, in this case the actual body of water is meant, rather than a personified deity. A form of the Anatolian weather god associated with the sea, ^{d}U arunaš, appears in this text, but is otherwise scarcely attested.

== Mythology ==
In most cases myths found in Hittite archives which feature the personified sea have foreign, specifically Hurrian, origin. One of such examples is the Song of the Sea. Additionally, multiple such compositions portray the sea as an ally of Kumarbi. Comparisons have been made between the portrayal of the sea god in them and Yam in Ugaritic texts.

An exception from the aforementioned rule is the text CTH 322, which has Hittite origin. It is referred to as Telipinu and the Daughter of the Sea God in modern publications. In this composition, the sea, portrayed as a personified deity, kidnaps the Sun god of Heaven and hides him. As a result, the world drowns in darkness, which prompts Tarḫunna, the weather god, to send his firstborn son Telipinu to retrieve him. His arrival apparently scares Aruna, who offers him his daughter as a bride. While not named in the myth, she is presumed to be one and the same as Telipinu's well attested spouse Ḫatepuna. The myth states that she subsequently stayed with Telepinu, and that both of them came to live with his father. Aruna apparently sent a messenger, possibly represented as a personified river, to demand a bride price from the storm god, prompting the latter to consult Ḫannaḫanna about the best course of action to take. Ḫannaḫanna advises him to pay the expected bride price, and as a result in the final preserved section of the narrative the sea god receives a thousand cattle and a thousand sheep. The tablet breaks off at this point, with the only other preserved line mentioning the brothers of an unspecified figure, though it is possible that the text KBo 26.128, a short fragment of a literary text in which Telipinu informs the sea god that he slept with his daughter, belongs to the same composition.

Aruna also plays a role in the myth of Ḫaḫḫima ("frost"). However, in this composition, the sun god is instead endangered by the aforementioned being instead, and the sea god tries to save him, as apparently he could be extinguished after falling down to earth otherwise. Possibly he suggests that he hide his light in a sealed container, which is then hidden underwater.

The text KUB 17 refers to the goddess Kamrušepa as the "mother of the sea".

=== Other references to the sea in Hittite literature ===
The sea could be connected to other adversaries of the gods, for example in the Illuyanka myth. The eponymous monster is described as the "snake of the sea" (arunaš ^{muš}illuyanka). Occasionally the sea was a metaphorical designation of distant locations or borders of the Hittite realm, as in the case of a ritual stating that the goddesses Istustaya and Papaya lived on its shores. The sea was also believed to be the residence of three goddesses bearing the name Ammama, presumably related to the traditions of the city of Zalpa, though their point of origin might have been the Mediterranean coast.
