= Šulinkatte =

Hattian and Hittite war god

- War god
- Major cult center: Tamarmara
- Weapon: sword
- Mount: lion
- Offspring: Weather god of Nerik

Šulinkatte was a Hittite god of Hattian origin. He was regarded as a war deity. Additionally, he could fulfill the role of a protector of palaces and houses. In the local tradition of Nerik, he was regarded as the father of the weather god of Nerik. He first appears in texts dated to the fifteenth or fourteenth century BCE. His main cult center was the sparsely attested city Tamarmara, but he was also worshiped elsewhere in ancient Anatolia, for example in Hattusa and Nerik. Fragments of a Hattic song celebrating him are also known.

== Name and character ==
The theonym Šulinkatte has Hattic origin. It is a combination of the words katte, "king", and šuli, of unknown meaning, and presumably can be translated as "king of šuli". It could be represented by the logogram ^{d}U.GUR. On this basis it has been proposed that the first part of his name can be interpreted as "sword", but this view found no widespread support. The writing ^{d}ZA.BA_{4}.BA_{4} is also attested.

Šulinkatte was a war god. He shared this role with many other deities in the Hittite pantheon, including fellow Hattian god Wurunkatte, Hittite Zappana and Iyarri, Hurrian Aštabi, Ḫešui, Nupatik and Tašmišu, Mesopotamian Nergal and Ugur and more. He was also believed to be the protective god of the royal palace, responsible for warding off demons. Various Hittite texts indicate that he might have more broadly played the role of protector of palaces, houses and gates.

According to a preserved description of a statue of Šulinkatte, he could be depicted standing on a lion, with a sword in one hand and a man's chopped off head in the other. This iconography reflects his character as a warlike god. He was portrayed as a young man according to the text KUB 57.105.

== Associations with other deities ==
In the local tradition of Nerik, Šulinkatte and the sun goddess of the Earth were regarded as the parents of the weather god of Nerik. A deity named Šulinkattainu, whose name is a combination of the theonym Šulinkatte and a Hattic diminutive suffix, is also known, and might also plausibly be his child. Volkert Haas suggested he should be identified with Taru, who he presumed was identical with the god from Nerik. This view is supported by other Hittitologists as well.

In incantations, Šulinkatte could appear in association with Kataḫzipuri, the Hattian goddess of magic.

== Worship ==
Oldest known attestations of Šulinkatte, such as the text CTH 516.B, come from the fifteenth or fourteenth century BCE. His main cult center was the sparsely attested city Tamarmara, located in central Anatolia. The aforementioned text is a ritual focused on him originating in this city, attributed to the priest Tarḫini. He had two festivals in this city as well, one in the beginning of the year and another in fall.

Šulinkatte's cult had a supraregional character. He was worshiped in Hattusa. During the AN.TAḪ.ŠUM festival, a celebration focused on him took place in the shrine of a deity designated by the sumerogram DINGIR.MAḪ. In the text KUB 44.23, he takes the place of Zilipuri, another Hattian god whose name could be written with the logogram ^{d}U.GUR. According to Manfred Hutter, a degree of overlay between these two gods only begins in the thirteenth century BCE. He was also worshiped in Karaḫna, a city located in the proximity of the middle run of Zuliya, identified as the modern Çekerek River. In Ḫanḫana and Kašḫa Šulinkatte was one of the twelve deities who were represented in the form of a ḫuwaši stele during a festival dedicated to Telipinu. He also appears in a similar listing connected to a ceremony from Zalpa.

A line from a praise song attributed the "women of Nerik" dedicated to Šulinkatte, written in Hattic, is also known, though only a few words can be translated with certainty, including katte ("king"), izzi ("auspicious") and karam ("wine").
