= Weather god of Nerik =

Hittite weather god

The Weather god of Nerik is a Hittite weather god, who was mainly worshipped in the Hittite city of Nerik, whose cult was relocated to Kaštama and Takupša for two hundred years after the Hittites lost Nerik to the Kaskians. He was also referred to as Nerak or Nerikkil.

In ancient Anatolia, weather gods were the rulers of the sky and the mountains. They cast down the thunder, lightning, clouds, rain and storms. The weather god of Nerik was also worshipped as a sender of rain, and as a fertility deity.

In the official Hittite state pantheon, the Weather god of Nerik was considered the son of the Weather god of Ḫatti and the Sun goddess of Arinna. However, at his cult centre in Nerik he was instead considered to be the son of the Hattian god Šulinkatte and Wurušemu, the Sun goddess of the Earth (eventually syncretized with Hattian Lelwani).

The partner of the Weather god of Nerik was the goddess Tešimi, the Lady of the Palace. During droughts, the winter and after the harvest, it was said that the Weather god of Nerik was asleep in Tešimi's lap. In Nerik, Tešimi was also considered to be the partner of the god Telipinu.

After the return of the Weather god of Nerik from exile in Kaštama, his statue was worshipped in his temple in Nerik, along with the image of the goddess Zašḫapuna, the city goddess of Kaštama. This does not necessarily mean that they were considered to be a couple since the Weather god of Nerik was already partnered with the goddess Tešimi and Zašḫapuna also had a partner already, the mountain god Zaliyanu.

== Bibliography ==
- Volkert Haas, Heidemarie Koch: Religionen des alten Orients: Hethiter und Iran. Vandenhoeck & Ruprecht, Göttingen 2011, ISBN 978-3-525-51695-9.
- Piotr Taracha: Religions of Second Millennium Anatolia. Harrassowitz, Wiesbaden 2009, ISBN 978-3-447-05885-8.
