= Elamite rock relief in Naqsh-e Rostam =

Archaeological artifact in present-day Iran

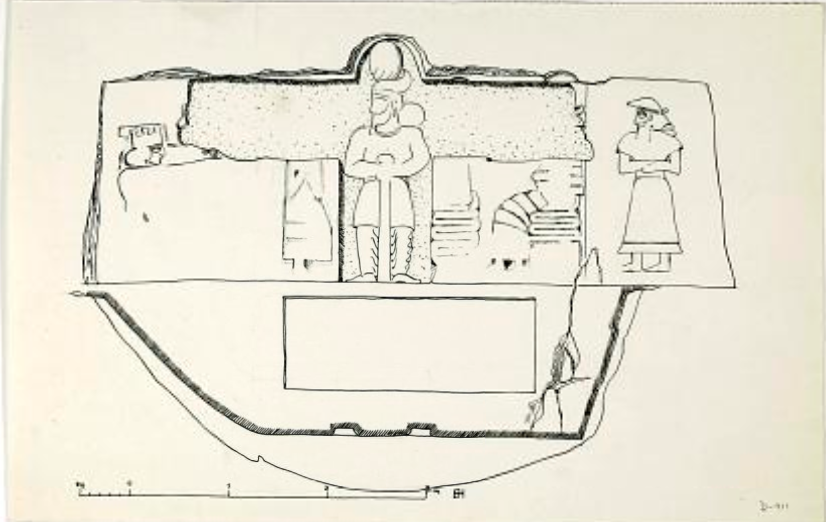

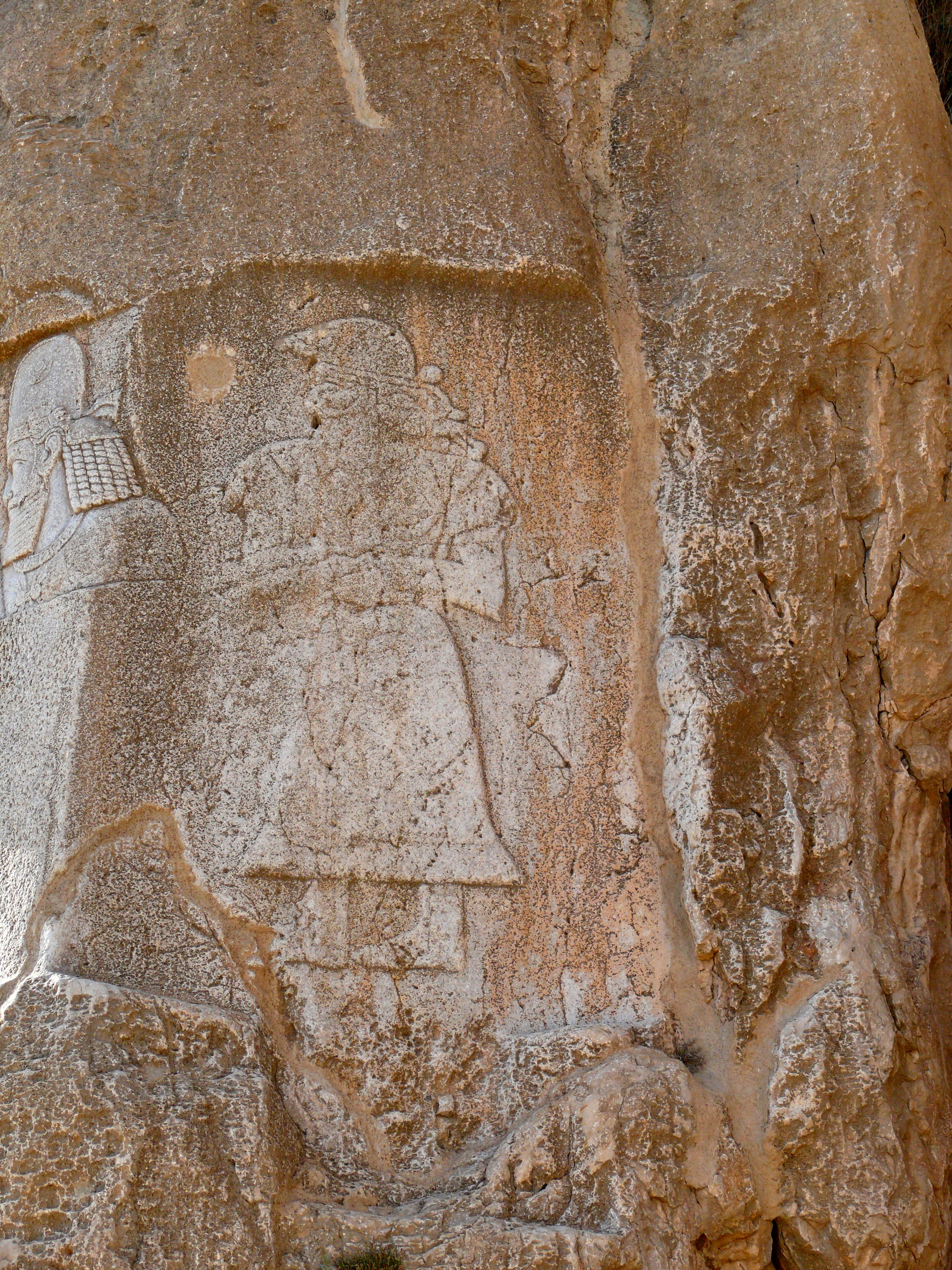
Rock relief of a king, on the right side

The Elamite rock relief in Naqsh-e Rostam is the oldest rock relief in Naqsh-e Rostam, belonging to the Elam culture. Bahram II, the Sasanian king, has destroyed this rock relief and carved his own relief on it. But small sections of the Elamite relief is still preserved.

Scholars do not have consensus about the date of this relief. Ernst Herzfeld and Heidemarie Koch have suggested that the date of the relief is 4,000 years ago. However, Alireza Shapour Shahbazi and Isa Behnam have suggested 1,200 BC as the date of this Elamite relief. The relief shows a god and a goddess seating on a throne. The legs of the throne are twisted with some snakes. On the right, there's a complete figure of a man with beard and long hairs. He has put his hands on his chest as a sign of respect to the god that once had existed in front of him, but now is completely destructed. On the left side, there's a figure of a woman with crown. It is believed that these man and woman are king and queen respectively and are worshiping the god and goddess. Small sections of god and goddess figures are still visible, but can't be recognized duo to the destruction.
