= Weather god of Zippalanda =

Hittite weather god

The Weather god of Zippalanda was a Hittite weather god, who was worshipped in the Hittite city of Zippalanda. The weather god of Zippalanda had several names, such as Ziplantil, Wašezzili, Wašezzil and Wašezzašu.

== Role ==
In ancient Anatolia, weather gods were the rulers of the sky and the mountains. They cast down thunder, lightning, clouds, rain and storms. The weather god of Zippalanda was also worshipped as a sender of rain. He was also worshipped as a fertility deity. Additionally, Wašezzili was referred to as a "lion" among the gods and therefore as a divine hero.

== Family ==
In the official state pantheon of the Hittites, the Weather god of Zippalanda Wasezzili was regarded as the son of Tarḫunna, the 'Weather god of Ḫatti', and the Sun goddess of Arinna. As the son of the Sun goddess of Arinna, he functioned as a divine intermediary with his mother.

However, in his cult centre at Zippalanda, Wasezzili's mother was different; he was considered the son Tarḫunna and the Sun goddess of the Earth. There he was worshipped with the Weather god of the Heavens as half of a divine dyad. His partner was the goddess Anzili or Enzili, who played a role in the rituals of Hittite childbirth. However, she was also presented as the partner of the Weather god of Šarišša.

== Bibliography ==
- Volkert Haas, Heidemarie Koch: Religionen des alten Orients: Hethiter und Iran. Vandenhoeck & Ruprecht, Göttingen 2011, ISBN 978-3-525-51695-9.
- Piotr Taracha: Religions of Second Millennium Anatolia. Harrassowitz, Wiesbaden 2009, ISBN 978-3-447-05885-8.
