= Šuwaliyat =

Hittite god

- God of vegetation
- Major cult center: Kanesh, Ḫupišna, Ḫunḫuišna

Equivalents
- Hurrian: Tašmišu
- Mesopotamian: Ninurta, Urash

Šuwaliyat was a Hittite god associated with vegetation. He was worshiped in Kanesh, Ḫupišna and Ḫunḫuišna, as well as in Hattusa. In a number of ritual texts he appears alongside the grain goddess Ḫalki. A close connection between him and the Hurrian god Tašmišu is also attested, and in Hittite adaptations of Hurrian myths and in other texts reflecting Hurrian influence his name could be used to designate his Hurrian counterpart.

== Name and character ==
It is presumed that the theonym Šuwaliyat is etymologically Hittite, and that it is an example of a gendered noun with the suffix -att, used to derive nouns from verbs or adjectives. Attested syllabic writings in Hittite cuneiform include nominative ^{d}šu-wa-li-ia-az, genitive ^{d}šu-wa-li-ia-at-aš, accusative ^{d}šu-wa-li-ia-at-ta-an and dative ^{d}šu-wa-li-ia-at-ti. The name is unrelated to that of the Hurrian goddess Šuwala.

The sumerograms ^{d}NIN.URTA and ^{d}URAŠ could be used to represent Šuwaliyat's name. However, as pointed out by Daniel Schwemer, he did not display any of Ninurta's non-agricultural traits, and in particular he was not regarded as a warlike deity. He was associated with vegetation and grain. Piotr Taracha argues his original character can be compared to that of Telipinu.

== Worship ==
Hittite texts indicate that Šuwaliyat was venerated as a local deity in Kanesh, Ḫupišna and Ḫunḫuišna. The last of these settlements is only known from a single reference to a festival dedicated to this god which took place there, identified in the text KUB 17.19. After the Old Hittite period, a new temple of either Šuwaliyat or Tašmišu was also built atop Büyükkale, a part of Hattusa.

In the KI.LAM festival, Šuwaliyat was paired with the grain goddess Ḫalki. The pair is attested elsewhere among gods the Hittites associated with Kanesh, as well as in the sphere of domestic worship. In the text KBo 22.124 (CTH 682) they both receive offerings alongside the vegetation deity Zinkuruwa.

== Šuwaliyat and Tašmišu ==
When Hurrian deities started to be venerated in the Hittite Empire, Šuwaliyat came to be identified with Tašmišu, the brother and servant of the Hurrian weather god, Teshub. The name of the former was effectively used to designate the latter. However, the association between the two depended entirely on their position in offering lists, and their character was not similar, with a connection with vegetation not attested for Tašmišu and warlike traits for Šuwaliyat. There was also no preexisting connection between Šuwaliyat and the weather god Tarḫunna in Hittite culture, and the latter's companion was typically Waššezili. The pairing of Šuwaliyat and a weather god in Hittite festivals which belonged to the sphere of state cult therefore reflects the connection between Teshub and Tašmišu, and according to Piotr Taracha can be considered an example of Kizzuwatnean influence. In the Hurro-Hittite itkalzi ritual, the name Šuwaliyat is also used to designate Tašmišu, in this context paired with Hurrian Nabarbi, his spouse. It is also possible that under one of his two names he is depicted in Yazılıkaya, though due to the state of preservation of the accompanying hieroglyphic Luwian inscription this remains uncertain.

The connection between the two gods is also well documented in Hurro-Hittite literary texts. The name Šuwaliyat is used to refer to Tašmišu in the Hittite version of myths belonging to the so-called Kumarbi Cycle. For example, in the Song of Kumarbi he is the brother of the weather god and Aranzaḫ. He also corresponds to Tašmišu in Hurro-Hittite bilinguals. In the case of the Song of Release ("Epic of Freeing"), the name Šuwaliyat appears in the Hittite passages dealing with the meetings between Teshub and Allani and Išḫara, but not in their Hurrian version.

It is possible that the connection between Šuwaliyat and Tašmišu also led to the use of the sumerograms ^{d}NIN.URTA and ^{d}URAŠ to designate the latter, which according to Daniel Schwemer is attested only in Hittite sources, while a god list from Emar instead presents Papsukkal as his Mesopotamian counterpart due to their similar characters as messenger deities.
