= Ḫannaḫanna =

Hittite mother goddess

Ḫannaḫanna (from Hittite ḫanna- "grandmother") was a Hittite mother goddess.

== Myths ==
Ḫannaḫanna appears in a number of Hittite myths, and tends to help in solving the problems faced by other gods in them. Most of them are myths dealing with the disappearance of deities, a common theme in Hittite myths.

=== The myths of Telepinu ===
After Telepinu disappeared, his father, the Storm-god Tarhunna, complained to Ḫannaḫanna. She then sent him out to search for his son, and when he gave up, she dispatched a bee, charging it to find Telepinu. The bee did that, and then purified and strengthened him by stinging his hands and feet and wiping his eyes and feet with wax.

In another myth about Telepinu's disappearance she recommended to Tarhunt that he should pay Aruna the bride price for the Sea-god's daughter, so she can wed Telepinu.

=== Myth of the disappearance of Inara ===
In yet another myth the Inara went missing and when Ḫannaḫanna was informed of this by the Storm-god's bee, she apparently began a search with the help of her female attendant.

=== Myth of the disappearance of Ḫannaḫanna ===
In a fragmentary myth, Ḫannaḫanna herself disappears for a while in a fit of anger. While she is gone, cattle and sheep are suffocated, and mothers, both human and animal pay no attention to their children. After her anger is banished to the Dark Earth, she returns rejoicing, and mothers care once again for their kin. Another means of banishing her anger was through burning brushwood and allowing the vapor to enter her body.

== See also ==
- Hittite mythology
