= Istustaya and Papaya =

Goddesses of destiny

Istustaya and Papaya are two goddesses of destiny with Hattian origin in Hittite religion.

The task of Istustaya and Papaya is to spin the thread of life, especially the one of the king. They sit at the shores of the Black Sea. After Telipinu's return they take part on the conference of gods.

== Literature ==
- Volkert Haas: Die hethitische Literatur, Walter de Gruyter GmbH & Co. KG, Berlin 2006, pages 111, 322, ISBN 978-3-11-018877-6

== See also ==
- Fates
