= Lelwani =

Hattian and Hittite deity of the underworld

- Deity of the underworld

Equivalents
- Hurrian: Allatum

Lelwani or Leluwani was a Hittite deity of the underworld of Hattic origin. While originally regarded as male and addressed as a "king," due to influence of Hurrian beliefs on the Hittites, Lelwani started to be viewed as female in later periods.

== Gender and syncretism ==
Lelwani was originally a male Hattic chthonic god incorporated into Hittite religion, referred to as "lord" and "king" (Hattic: katte, logographically: LUGAL-uš). However, due to syncretism with female deities during the period of growing Hurrian influence on Hittite state religion, Lelwani started to be regarded as a goddess instead. The change happened no later than during the reign of Ḫattušili III. An early attestation of this phenomenon is known from a text attributed to queen Puduḫepa.

Allatum, originally the Akkadian form of the name of the Hurrian underworld goddess Allani, could denote Lelwani in Hittite texts. However, Hurrian Allani and Mesopotamian Ereshkigal were associated with the Hittite and Luwian Sun goddess of the Earth rather than Lelwani. Additionally, Allani and Lelwani coexisted as separate deities in god lists and in rituals, with Allani's name written logographically as EREŠ.KI.GAL and Lelwani's as Allatum.

The Hattian and Hittite underworld deities, such as Lelwani, were not regarded as analogous to the Hurrian enna amatenna, so-called "ancestral gods" or "former gods" who inhabited the underworld, even though similar Hittite terms could be applied to both groups.

== Functions ==
Lelwani's primary function was that of the ruler of the underworld. It is assumed that as such he was responsible for determining human lifespans alongside the fate goddesses. It has been proposed that an analogous association between Allani and the fate goddesses Hutena and Hutellura is the reason behind their association in Hurrian sources.

A variety of secondary functions are attributed to her in Hittite texts. Annals of Tudhaliya indicate that Lelwani was also one of the deities assumed to accompany rulers during military campaigns; in a number of prayers she is considered capable of granting long life and good health; palace officials swore oaths in her name to guarantee they will perform their tasks correctly.

== Worship ==
Lelwani was worshiped during festivals associated with the so-called ḫešta-house, to which the priest of this deity was attached. One example of such a celebration was purulli, described in the Hittite text CTH 645. Much like Lelwani, it had Hattic origin. While it was connected to the renewal of life in spring, the invoked deities were linked to the underworld and in addition to Lelwani included the Hittite Šiwat (or Izzištanu in Hattic), a deity representing "Propitious Day," a euphemism for the last day of a person's life, the fate goddesses Ištuštaya and Papaya, Urunzimu, who was the chthonic aspect of the Sun goddess of Arinna, and deities represented by the logogram U.GUR, among others.

In a ritual performed in relation to the construction of a new royal palace Lelwani was invoked alongside Ḫašamili, the blacksmith of the gods.

Queen Puduḫepa prayed to Lelwani to secure long, healthy lives for her family, as evidenced by the text KUB 21.27(+) III 31-38.
