= Arinna =

Cult center of the Hittite sun goddess

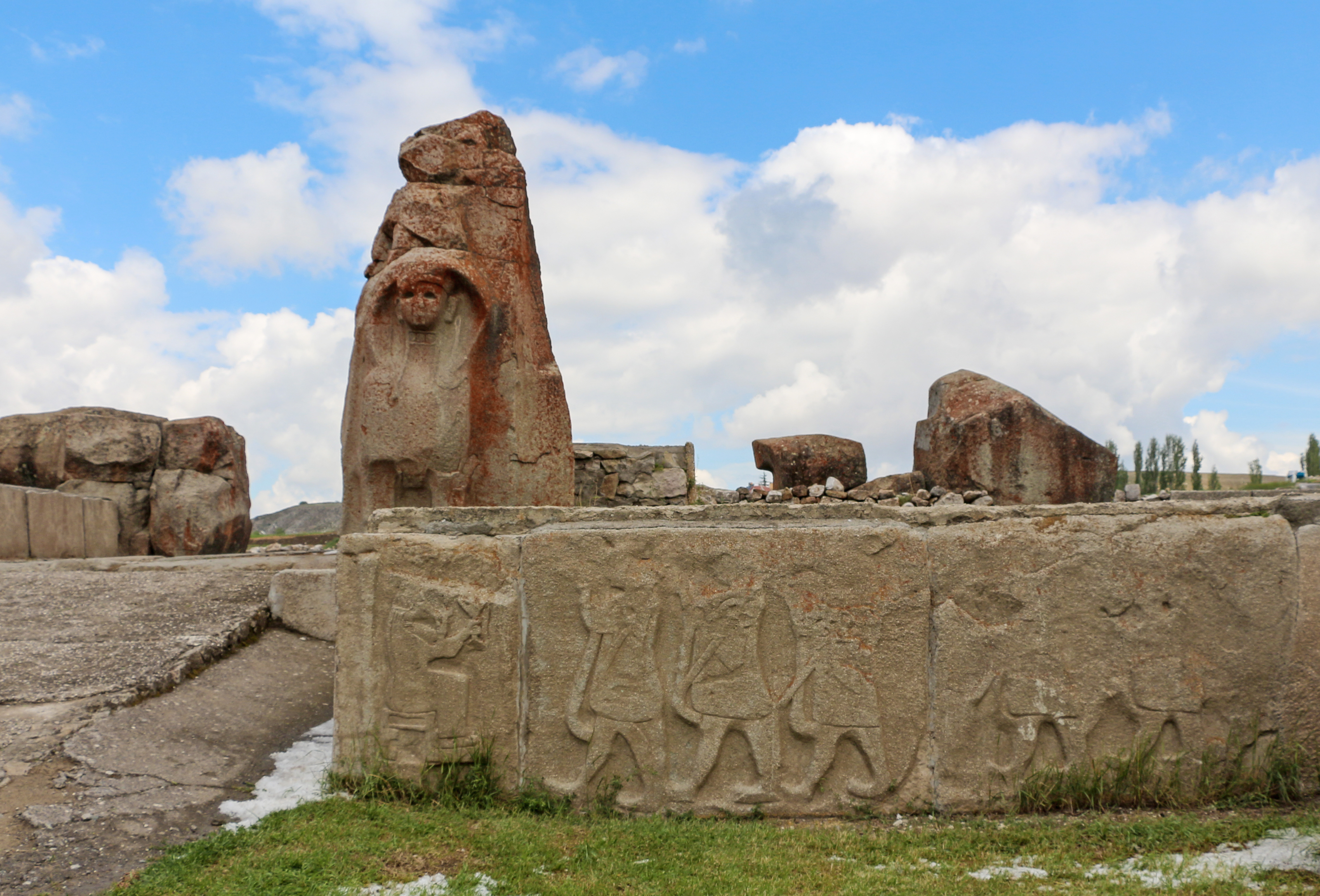
Relief of the Sun-Goddess of Arinna in Alaca Höyük

Arinna was the major cult center of the Hittite sun-goddess known as ^{d}UTU ^{URU}Arinna or "Sun-Goddess of Arinna", who is also sometimes identified as Arinniti or as Wuru(n)šemu. Arinna was located near Hattusa, the Hittite capital.

The Sun-Goddess of Arinna is the most important one of three important solar deities of the Hittite pantheon, besides ^{d}UTU nepisas 'the sun of the sky' and ^{d}UTU taknas 'the sun of the earth'.

She was considered to be the chief deity in some sources, in place of her husband. Her consort was the Storm-God; they and their children were all derived from the former Hattic pantheon.

The goddess was also perceived to be a paramount chthonic or earth goddess. She becomes largely syncretised with the Hurrian goddess Hebat, as the Hittite Storm-God was with Teshub.

In the late 14th century BC, King Mursili II was particularly devoted to the Sun-Goddess of Arinna.

Karaşehir Hüyük has been suggested as the site of Arinna.

== See also ==
- Hittite mythology
- Alaca Höyük

== Literature ==
- Hans G. Güterbock, An Addition to the Prayer of Muršili to the Sungoddess and Its Implications, Anatolian Studies (1980).
