= Inara (goddess) =

Goddess in Hittite–Hurrian mythology

Inara or Inar, in Hittite mythology, was the goddess of the wild animals of the steppe and daughter of the Storm-god Teshub/Tarhunt. She corresponds to the "potnia theron" of Greek mythology, better known as Artemis.

== Myths ==
After the dragon Illuyanka wins an encounter with the storm god, the latter asks Inara to give a feast, most probably the Purulli festival. Inara decides to use the feast to lure and defeat Illuyanka, who was her father's archenemy, and enlists the aid of a mortal named Hupasiyas of Zigaratta by becoming his lover. The dragon and his family gorge themselves on the fare at the feast, becoming quite drunk, which allows Hupasiyas to tie a rope around them. Inara's father can then kill Illuyanka, thereby preserving creation.

Inara built a house on a cliff and gave it to Hupasiyas. She left one day with instructions that he was not to look out the window, as he might see his family. But he looked and the sight of his family made him beg to be allowed to return home. It is not known what happened next, but there is speculation that Inara killed Hupasiyas for disobeying her, or for hubris, or that he was allowed to return to his family.

The mother goddess Hannahanna promises Inara land and a man during a consultation by Inara. Inara then disappears. Her father looks for her, joined by Hannahanna with a bee. The story resembles that of Demeter and her daughter Persephone in Greek mythology.

== See also ==
- Hittite mythology
