= Kuşaklı (Sarissa) =

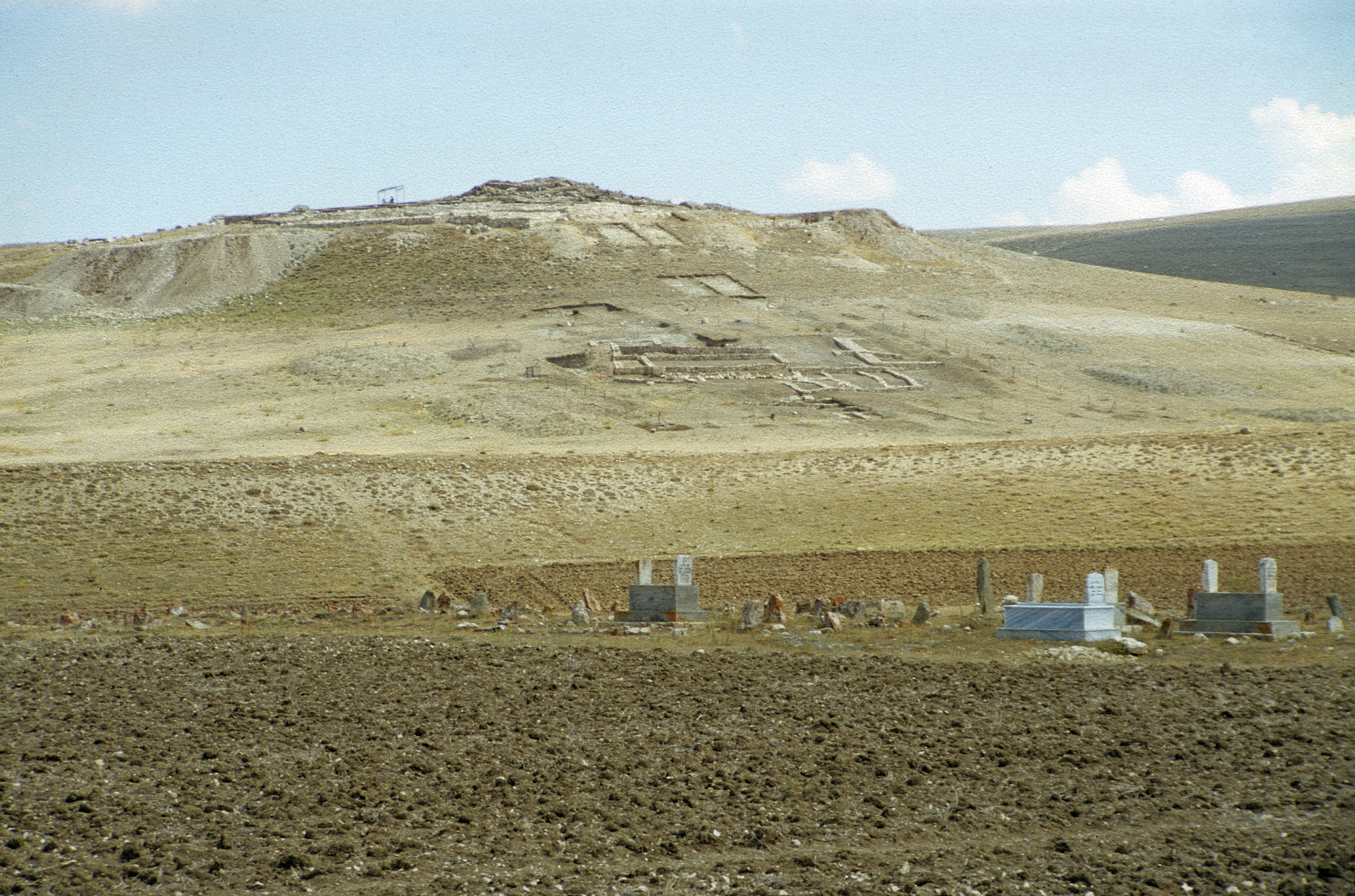

- Location within Turkey
- 39°18′30″N 36°54′35″E
- Type: Settlement
- Cultures: Hittite
- Location: Sivas Province, Turkey
- Region: Anatolia

Site notes
- Condition: In ruins

Kuşaklı (also known as Šarišša, Kuşaklı-Sarissa) is an archaeological site in Turkey. During the ancient Hittite period, it was known as Sarissa. It is located 4 km (2 1/2 miles) west of Başören village of Altınyayla district in Sivas Province, 60 km (37 1/3 miles) south of Sivas city.

== History ==
Two Hittite town consisted of an upper and lower city. The upper city had a town wall with towers and several gates. Only small parts of the living quarters were excavated. The houses had irregular plans and were separated by small streets. Two larger houses were excavated in the middle of the town, not far away from the main temple. Typical for these houses is a central hall with many smaller rooms around it. In one of the houses (house A) were found 45 cuneiform clay tablets with ritual texts. It seems possible that house A was the house of a priest.

About 5 km south of the town was lake. Next to it were found the building of a temple. In Hettite texts is mentioned that the king came to the town and went directly to the Huwasistone of the Weather god. The excavators wonder whether this temple and lake are actually the place of the Huwasistone, where certain rituals were performed.

=== Late Bronze ===
Sarissa was founded in the 16th century BC as a midsized provincial town, close to Kussara. The scribes in Hattusa catalogued Sarissa in the "Upper Land" of Hatti.

"There were gates at the four corners of the city... one city gate is of Syrian-Levantine form." In 2004, the team uncovered a pool or dam by the northwest gate - the oldest known dam in Anatolia. The gate contains wood, and dendrochronology has claimed that the wood was cut 1530 BC; but this finding has not been peer reviewed.

In the 14th century BC, Sarissa was sacked during the turmoil and rebellions during the reign of Arnuwanda I. It was then rebuilt under the Hittite revival from Samuha under Tudhaliya III.

The main deity of Sarissa was the Weather-God; he is named in the treaty between Hattusili III and Rameses II. The temple of the god is the largest Hittite temple so far excavated. It is built of stones with a huge courtyard in the middle, about 76 by 74 m large. a second temple was in the north of the city. It has again a larger courtyard and is about 54 by 36 m big. It was perhaps the temple of the goddess Anzili, who is mentioned in the texts of the town. Within this temple were also found seal impressions of a so far unknown king.

Fragments of a Mycenaean pottery vessel was found in one room of the north-western city gate. Mycenaean vessels are otherwise extremely rare in Hittite context, while they are very common at other places in the Mediterranean. On seal impressions was found a so far unknown king called Mizima. He might be a local governor, claiming the king's title.

Sarissa was sacked again with the other Hittite cities in 1200 BC. Its site was reoccupied and repaired, but then abandoned.

=== Iron Age ===
In the Iron Age, there was small village on the side in the 7th century BC, and shortly later a round fortress was erected here in the 6th century BC. In early Roman times a single tumulus tomb was built at the highest point. The stone built chamber was found looted but contained the remains of 6 skeletons.

== Excavations ==
Excavation continues under the direction of Andreas Müller-Karpe. Excavations began in 1992. Dirk Mielke identified from the 16th to 13th centuries BC three "pottery horizons" and two Hittite building layers of different character. Mielke further identified a third, Iron Age building layer.

In the second excavation campaign, the archaeologists discovered written records of its Hittite period; the fourth, smallest, and so far last major archive in the Hittite language. In 1997 Gernot Wilhelm reported:

The large majority of the 45 tablet fragments published were found in the southern room of building A in the Western part of the Acropolis. Both the small finds in the room and the contents of the tablets suggest that the room had a connection with ritual practices. The finds belong to layer 2 (period of the Empire) which perished in a conflagration (2nd half of 13th century BC). It is due to the effects of this fire that the tablets, originally stored in an unbaked condition, survived. The contents of the tablets, written by several hands, refer to the ritual practice, namely cult and prophecy. Most numerous are "oracle protocols" for lot and bird oracles, rarer are "cult inventories" dealing with ritual festivals, idols and cultic supply. Two tablets represent the category of "festival rituals" and describe the celebration of the spring festival by the king in Šarišša (Šarešša).

== See also ==
- Cities of the ancient Near East
- Short chronology timeline
