= Tarḫunna =

Hittite thunder deity

- Hittite storm god
- Member of Hittite pantheon
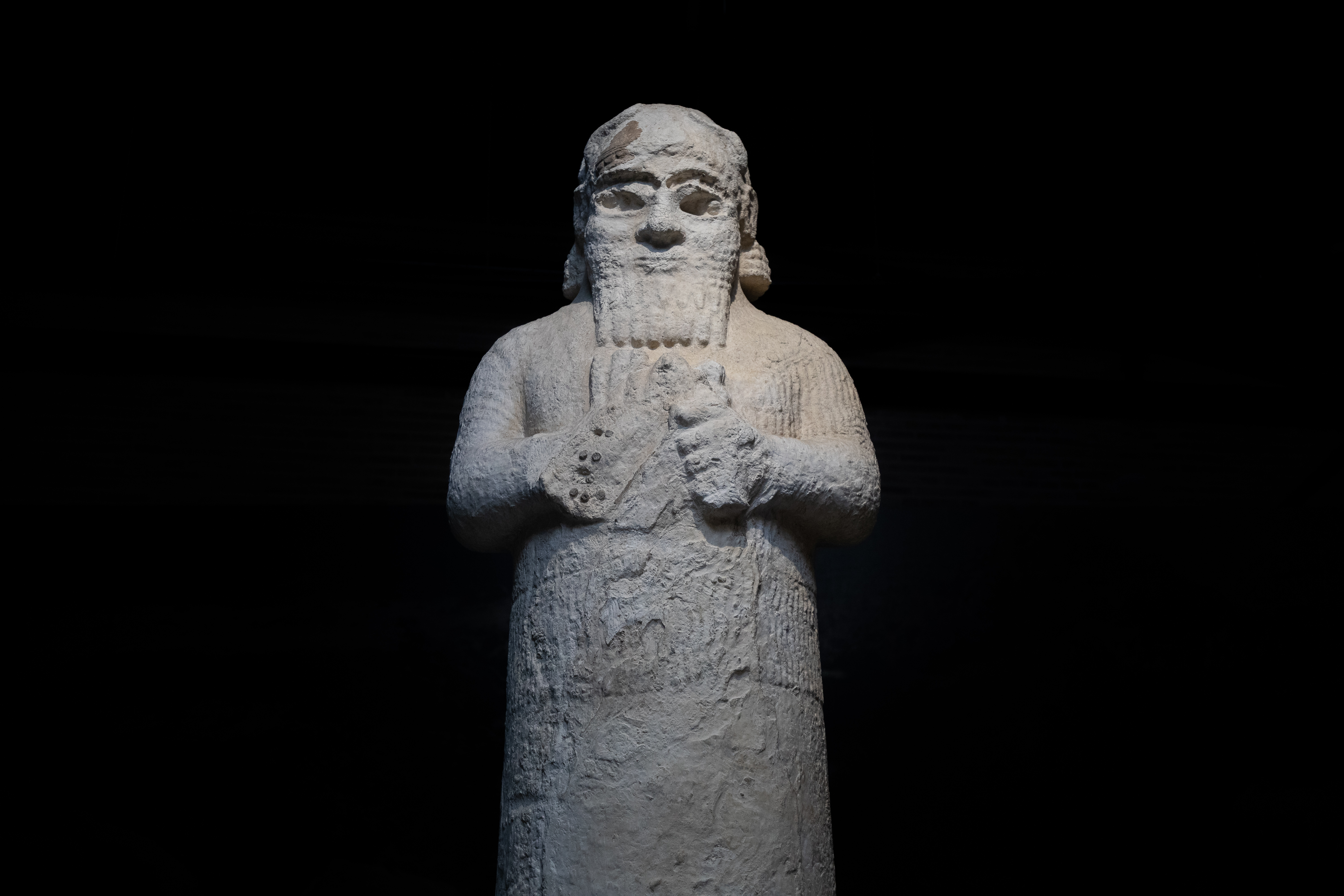
- Tarḫunna statue in Adana museum
- Other names: Tarhun, Tarhunda, Tarhunza, Taru, Tarḫunz

Genealogy
- Siblings: Šuwaliyat, Aranzaḫ
- Consort: Sun goddess of Arinna
- Offspring: Telipinu, Kammamma, Mezulla, Inara, Weather god of Zippalanda, Weather god of Nerik.

Equivalents
- Hurrian: Teššup
- Canaanite: Baal

Tarḫunna or Tarḫuna/i was the Hittite weather god. He was also referred to as the "Weather god of Heaven" or the "Lord of the Land of Hatti".

== Name ==
Tarḫunna is a cognate of the Hittite verb tarḫu-^{zi}, "to prevail, conquer, be powerful, be able, defeat"; from the Proto-Anatolian weather god *Tṛḫu-ent-, "conquering"; ultimately from PIE *terh₂-, "to cross over, pass through, overcome". The same name was used in almost all Anatolian languages: Luwian Tarḫunz-; Carian Trquδ-; Milyan Trqqñt-, and Lycian: Trqqas (A), Trqqiz (B).

Norbert Oettinger has argued that the functions of the Anatolian weather god ultimately come from the Proto-Indo-European god Perk^{w}unos, but that they did not preserve the old name to coin instead the new epithet Tṛḫu-ent- ("conquering"), which sounded close to the name of the Hattian Storm-god Taru.

== Role ==
As weather god, Tarḫunna was responsible for the various manifestations of the weather, especially thunder, lightning, rain, clouds, and storms. He ruled over the heavens and the mountains. Thus it was Tarḫunna who decided whether there would be fertile fields and good harvests, or drought and famine and he was treated by the Hittites as the ruler of the gods.

Tarḫunna legitimised the position of the Hittite king, who ruled the land of Hatti in the name of the gods. He watched over the kingdom and the other institutions of the state, but also borders and roads.

== Genealogy ==
Tarḫunna is the partner of the Sun goddess of Arinna. Their children are the gods Telipinu and Kammamma, the goddesses Mezulla and Inara, the Weather god of Zippalanda and the Weather god of Nerik.

As a result of his identification with the Hurrian god Teššup, Tarḫunna is also the partner of Ḫepat (who is syncretised with the Sun goddess of Arinna) and the father of the god Šarruma and the goddesses Allanzu and Kunzišalli.

His siblings are Šuwaliyat (identified with the Hurrian Tašmišu) and Aranzaḫ, the goddess of the Tigris river.

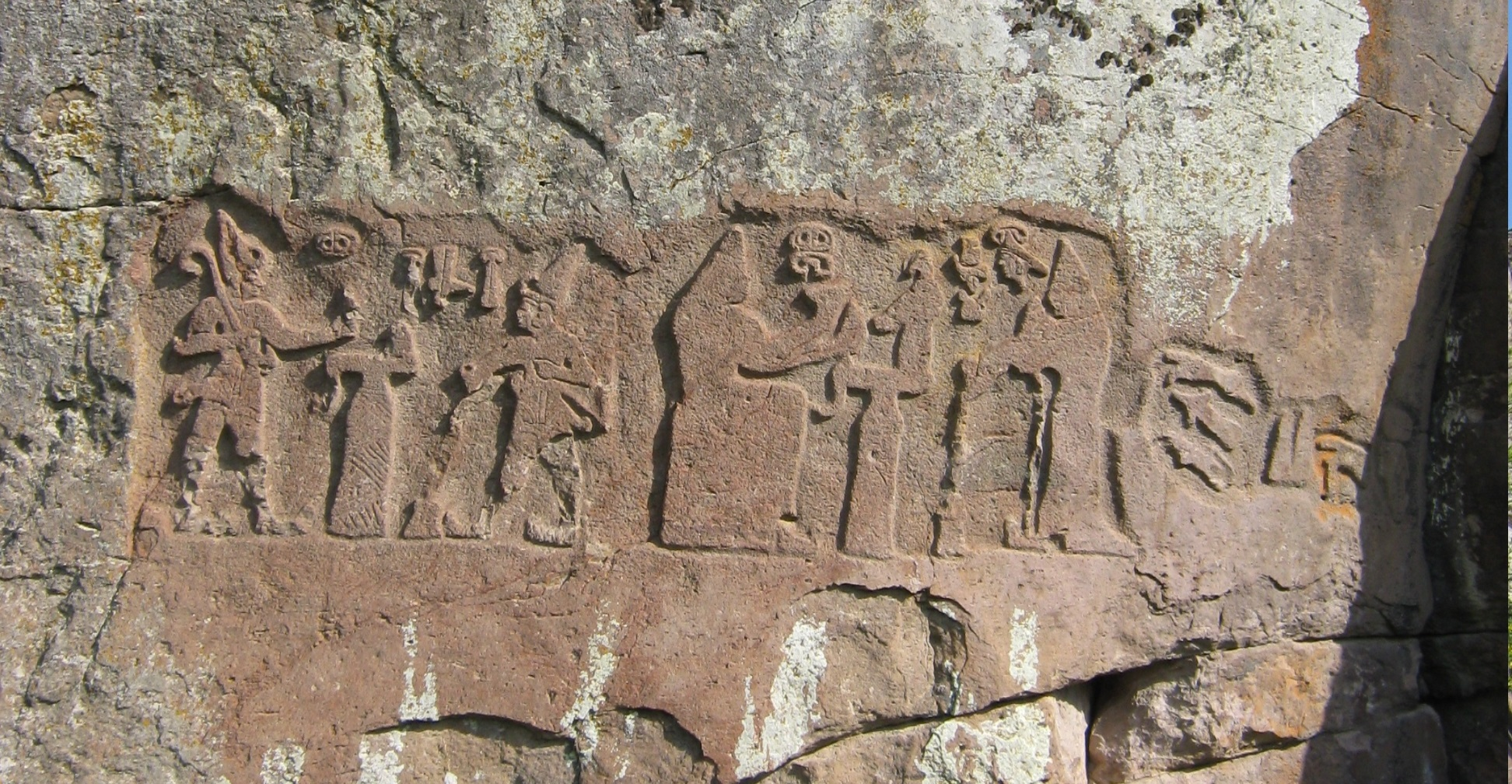
Ḫattušili and Puduḫepa make offerings to Tarḫunna and Ḫepat, on the Fıraktın relief.

== Depictions ==
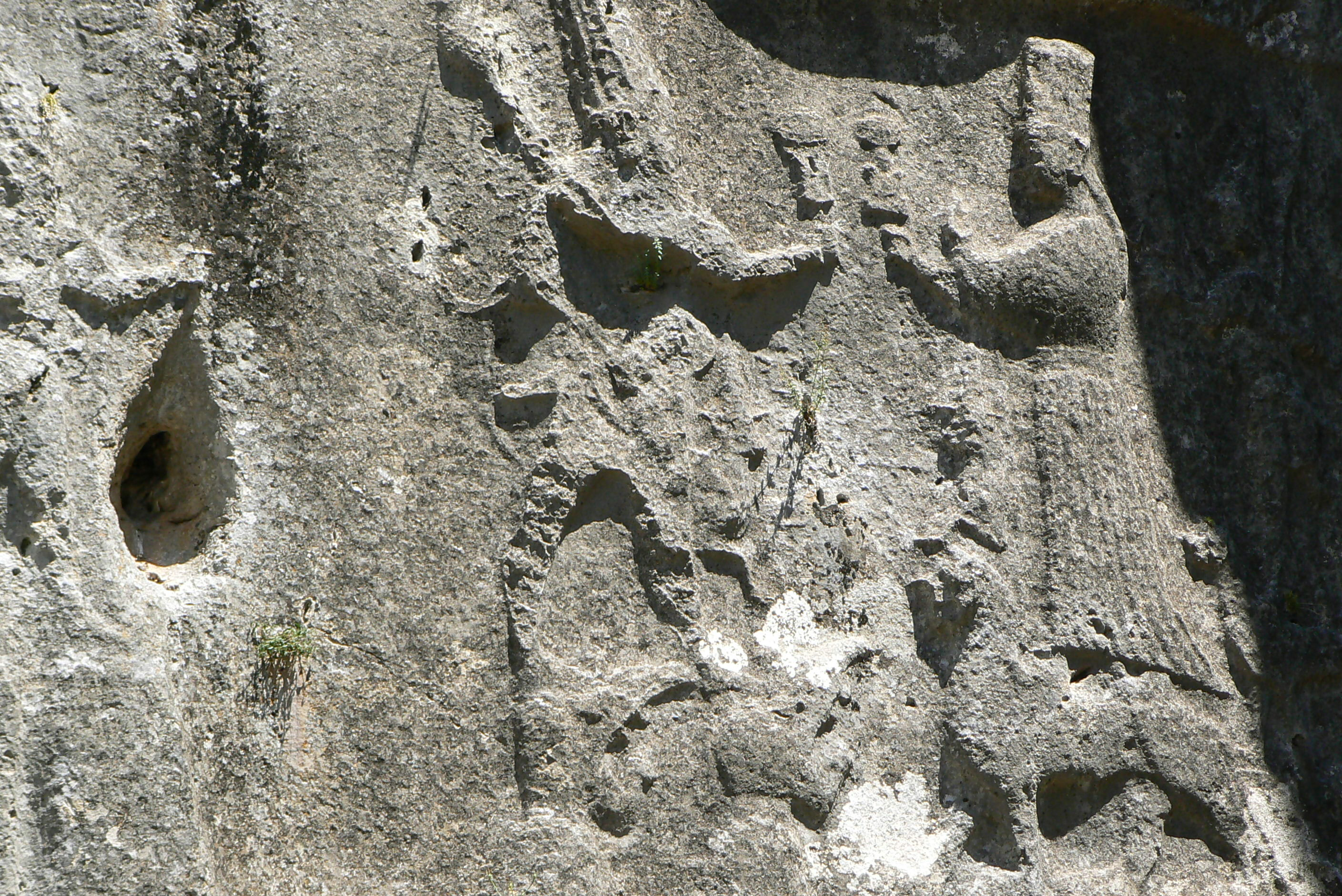
Tarḫunna at left, on top of Namni and Huzzi, with Hebat at right, Yazılıkaya

Tarḫunna was the chief god of the Hittites and is depicted at the front of a long line of male gods in rock reliefs at the sanctuary of Yazılıkaya. There he is depicted as a bearded man with a pointed cap and a sceptre, standing on the backs of the mountain gods Namni and Ḫazzi and holding a three-pronged thunderbolt in his hand. Later depictions show him with a battle axe in the form of an adze.

== Equivalents ==
The god had cognates in most other ancient Anatolian languages. In Hattian (a non-Indo-European language), he was called Taru; in Luwian, Tarḫunz (Cuneiform: Tarḫu(wa)nt(a)-, Hieroglyphic: DEUS TONITRUS); in Palaic, Zaparwa; in Lycian, Trqqas/Trqqiz; and in Carian, Trquδe (dat.).

In the wider Mesopotamian sphere, he was associated with Hadad and Teššup.

The Luwian god Tarḫunz worshipped by the Iron Age Neo-Hittite states was closely related to Tarḫunna. Personal names referring to Tarḫunz, like "Trokondas", are attested into Roman times.

Tarhunna has also been identified with the later Armenian and Roman god, Jupiter Dolichenus.

== Bibliography ==
- Gerhard J. Bellinger: Knaurs Lexikon der Mythologie. 3100 Stichwörter zu den Mythen aller Völker von den Anfängen bis zur Gegenwart. Droemer Knaur, München 1989, ISBN 3-426-26376-9.
- Volkert Haas: Die hethitische Literatur. Texte, Stilistik, Motive. de Gruyter, Berlin. 2006, ISBN 3-11-018877-5.
- Volkert Haas, Heidemarie Koch: Religionen des alten Orients: Hethiter und Iran. Vandenhoeck & Ruprecht, Göttingen 2011, ISBN 978-3-525-51695-9.
- John David Hawkins: "What does the Hittite Storm-God hold?" In: Diederik J. W. Meijer (Ed.): Natural Phenomena. Their Meaning, Depiction and Description in the Ancient Near East (= Koninklijke Nederlandse Akademie van Wetenschappen, Afd. Letterkunde. Verhandelingen. Volume 152). North-Holland, Amsterdam. 1992, ISBN 0-444-85759-1, pp. 53–82.
- Einar von Schuler: "Kleinasien: Die Mythologie der Hethiter und Hurriter – Der Hauptwettergott." In: Hans Wilhelm Haussig (Ed.): Götter und Mythen im Vorderen Orient (= Wörterbuch der Mythologie. Part 1: Die alten Kulturvölker. Volume 1). Klett-Cotta, Stuttgart 1965, pp. 208–212, at p. 209–210.
- Piotr Taracha: Religions of Second Millennium Anatolia (= Dresdner Beiträge zur Hethitologie. Volume 27). Harrassowitz, Wiesbaden 2009, ISBN 978-3-447-05885-8 Tarḫunna at Google Books.
- Maciej Popko: Völker und Sprachen Altanatoliens. Harrassowitz Verlag, Wiesbaden 2008, ISBN 978-3-447-05708-0.
- Calvert Watkins: "The Golden Bowl: Thoughts on the New Sappho and its Asianic Background." Classical Antiquity. Volume 26, 2007, pp. 305–324.
