= Telipinu (mythology) =

Hittite agricultural god

Telipinu (Hittite: 𒀭𒋼𒂊𒇷𒁉𒉡𒌑, romanized: ^{d}Te(-e)-li-pí-nu(-ú); Hattic: Talipinu or Talapinu, "Exalted Son") was a Hittite god who most likely served as a patron of farming, though he has also been suggested to have been a storm god or an embodiment of crops. He was a son of the weather god Tarḫunna (Taru) and the solar goddess Arinniti in the system of their mythology. His wife was the goddess Ḫatepuna, though he was also paired with Šepuru and Kataḫḫa at various cultic centres.

Telipinu was honored every nine years with an extravagant festival in the autumn at Ḫanḫana and Kašḫa, wherein 1000 sheep and 50 oxen were sacrificed and the symbol of the god, an oak tree, was replanted. He was also invoked formulaically in a daily prayer for King Muršili II during the latter's reign.

An ancient Hittite myth about Telipinu, the Telipinu Myth, describes how his disappearance causes all fertility to fail, both plant and animal:

Mist seized the windows. Smoke seized the house. On the hearth the logs were stifled. On the altars the gods were stifled. In the fold the sheep were stifled. In the corral the cows were stifled. The sheep refused her lamb. The cow refused her calf. Telipinu went off and took away grain, the fertility of the herds, growth, plenty, and satiety into the wilderness, to the meadow and the moor... Humans and gods perish from hunger.

In order to stop the havoc and devastation, the gods seek Telipinu but fail to find him. Hannahanna, the mother goddess, sent a bee to find him; when the bee did, stinging Telipinu and smearing wax on him, the god grew angry and began to wreak destruction on the world. Finally, Kamrušepa, goddess of magic, calmed Telipinu by giving his anger to the Doorkeeper of the Underworld.

In other references it is a mortal priest who prays for all of Telipinu's anger to be sent to bronze containers in the underworld, from which nothing escapes. In either case, it is difficult to determine anything about the nature of Telipinu from this myth, as myths along the same pattern have also been found featuring the unrelated goddessess Anzili and Zukki.

It has been suggested that Telipinu endured in later mythology as the Greek Telephus and the Caucasian Telepia, but this identification is uncertain. In addition, his name was adopted by several kings, such as the Hittite monarch Telipinu.
