= Heidemarie Koch =

German Iranologist (1943–2022)

Heidemarie Koch (17 December 1943 – 28 January 2022) was a German Iranologist.

portrait

== Life and career ==
Koch was born in Merseburg, Saxony, Prussia, Germany. She studied mathematics as her major between 1963 and 1966. Subsequently, she worked as a teacher in Hanover, Lower Saxony, West Germany, until 1972.

In 1972, she started Iranian studies at the University of Göttingen and received her doctorate in 1976. The topic of her dissertation under Walther Hinz was the religious conditions under Darius I, based on Elamite tablets of Persepolis ("Die religiösen Verhältnisse der Dareioszeit. Untersuchungen an Hand der elamischen Persepolistäfelchen."). Koch took as her minor subjects Classical archaeology, Byzantine art history, and Christian archaeology.

From 1977 to 1986 she was employed at the Department of Iranian Studies and Near Eastern Archaeology at the University of Göttingen. In 1986, at the University of Marburg, she worked on the topics of labour administration and the economy in the Persian heartland at the time of the Achaemenids, and taught as a lecturer. In 1990–91 Koch worked on research projects funded by German Research Foundation. Between 1993 and 1994 she taught for two semesters as a substitute professor at the Goethe University Frankfurt. Since 1995 she was professor of Iranian studies in the context of ancient history at the University of Marburg.

Her main subject areas were the Persian history and Persian languages of the pre-Islamic period. She focused on cultural and economic history, management and religion, utilising both written sources and the archaeological remains. A second research focus was the exploration of Elam and its neighboring regions, especially in terms of the influences that they exerted on the subsequent Persian Empire.

Koch was married to the Biblical archaeologist Guntram Koch. She died on 28 January 2022, at the age of 78.

== Works ==
Koch's works included:

- Die religiösen Verhältnisse der Dareioszeit. Untersuchungen an Hand der elamischen Persepolistäfelchen, Harrassowitz, Wiesbaden 1977 (Göttinger Orientforschungen. Reihe 3, Iranica Bd. 4) ISBN 3-447-01889-5
  The Religious Conditions of the Time of Darius. Investigations with reference to the Elamite Persepolis Tablets. Harrassowitz, Wiesbaden 1977 (Göttingen Oriental Research. Row 3, Iranica Vol. 4)
- Kunst, Kultur und Geschichte der Achämenidenzeit und ihr Fortleben (ed.), Reimer, Berlin 1983 (Archäologische Mitteilungen aus Iran. Ergänzungsband 10) ISBN 3-496-00711-7
  Art, Culture and History of the Achaemenids and their Survival (ed.), Reimer, Berlin 1983 (Archaeological Messages from Iran. Suppl 10)
- Elamisches Wörterbuch (mit Walther Hinz), Reimer, Berlin 1987 (Archäologische Mitteilungen aus Iran, Ergänzungsband, 17) ISBN 3-496-00923-3
  Elamite dictionary (with Walther Hinz), Reimer, Berlin 1987 (Archaeological Messages from Iran, Supplement, 17)
- Verwaltung und Wirtschaft im persischen Kernland zur Zeit der Achämeniden, Reichert, Wiesbaden 1990 (Beihefte zum Tübinger Atlas des Vorderen Orients. Reihe B, Geisteswissenschaften Nr. 89) ISBN 3-88226-468-3
  Management and Economics in the Persian Heartland at the Time of the Achaemenids, Reichert, Wiesbaden 1990 (supplements to the Tübingen Atlas of the Near East. Series B, Humanities No. 89)
- Es kündet Dareios der König ... Vom Leben im persischen Grossreich, von Zabern, Mainz 1992 (Kulturgeschichte der antiken Welt; Bd. 55) ISBN 3-8053-1347-0 (also published in Persian in Iran)
  So Says King Darius ... Life in the Persian Empire, Saverne, Mainz 1992 (Cultural History of the Ancient World; Vol. 55)
- Achämeniden-Studien (Achaemenid Studies), Harrassowitz, Wiesbaden 1993, ISBN 3-447-03328-2
- Persepolis. Hauptstadt des achämidischen Großreichs (Persepolis: Capital of the Achaemid Great Empire), Farhangsara Yassavoli, Tehran 1997 ISBN 964-306-049-7
- Persepolis: Glänzende Hauptstadt des Perserreichs, von Zabern, Mainz 2001 (Antike Welt Sonderheft/Zaberns Bildbände zur Archäologie) ISBN 3-8053-2813-3
  Persepolis: Shiny Capital of the Persian Empire, Saverne, Mainz 2001 (Antique World special issue / Saverne Illustrated books on archaeology)
- Königreiche im alten Vorderen Orient, von Zabern, Mainz 2006 (Antike Welt Sonderheft/Zaberns Bildbände zur Archäologie) ISBN 978-3-8053-3621-5
  Kingdoms in the Ancient Near East, Saverne, Mainz 2006 (Antique World special issue / Saverne Illustrated boks on archaeology)
- Körner, Knollen, Brot und Wein. Die Geschichte unserer Esskulturen. (Grains, Tubers, Bread and Wine. The History of Our Food Cultures) Köppe, Köln 2006 ISBN 978-3-89645-409-6
- Frauen und Schlangen. Die geheimnisvolle Kultur der Elamer in Alt-Iran, von Zabern, Mainz 2007 (Kulturgeschichte der antiken Welt; Bd. 114) ISBN 978-3-8053-3737-3
  Women and Snakes. The Mysterious Culture of the Elamites in Old Iran, Saverne, Mainz 2007 (Cultural History of the Ancient World; vol 114)
