= Volkert Haas =

Volkert Haas (1 November 1936 – 13 May 2019) was a German Assyrologist and Hittitologist.

== Life ==
Volkert Haas studied Assyrology and Near Eastern archaeology at the Free University of Berlin and the University of Marburg from 1963 to 1968. In December 1968 he received a doctorate in Assyriology from the Free University. After that, he was an assistant at the "Institute for the History of Medicine" at the Free University from 1969 to 1970. There he worked on Babylonian and Assyrian medical texts under the supervision of Franz Köcher. From 1970 to 1973, he carried out the research project "The Hurritological Archive" within the Ancient Near Eastern department of the Free University and he continued to be employed there as an assistant from 1973 to 1977. In 1979, Haas received his habilitation in Ancient Near Eastern philology. After holding an assistant professorship at the Free University from 1977 to 1981, Haas received a position as Professor of Near Eastern Studies at the University of Konstanz. In 1989, he received one of the two chairs of Near Eastern Studies at the Free University, where he remained until his retirement in 2001.

As a lecturer, Haas instructed several generations of students in Assyrian, Hittite, and Hurrian. The central focuses of his research were the language, literature and religious history of the Hurrians and the Hittites. Haas was one of the most prestigious specialists in Hittitology. His ongoing research projects are the Corpus der hurritischen Sprachdenkmäler or Hurritologisches Archiv (Corpus of Hurrian linguistic monuments or Hurritological Archive), "the Near Eastern Religions", "Hittite Medical Treatment," and a history of Hittite literature. He was editor of Altorientalische Forschungen (AoF).

== Bibliography ==
- Thomas Richter (assyriologist) (ed.): Kulturgeschichten. Altorientalistische Studien für Volkert Haas zum 65. Geburtstag. SDV, Saarbrücken 2001, ISBN 3-930843-74-9.
- Hazenbos, Joost; Klinger, Jörg; Novák, Mirko (10 July 2019). "Volkert Haas". Altorientalische Forschungen (in German). 46 (1): 5–6. doi:10.1515/aofo-2019-0101. ISSN 2196-6761.

== Selected works ==
- (Editor) Corpus der hurritischen Sprachdenkmäler. (Corpus of Hurrian linguistic monuments). Several volumes, Bonsignori, Rom 1963 ff.
- Hurritologische Studien. (Hurritological Studies) Neukirchener Verlag, Kevelaer o. J.
- Hethitische Berggötter und hurritische Steindämonen. Riten, Kulte und Mythen. Eine Einführung in die altkleinasiatischen religiösen Vorstellungen (Hittite Mountain Gods and Hurrian Stone Spirits: Rites, Cults, and Myths. An Introduction to the Religious Ideas of Ancient Asia Minor (= Kulturgeschichte der Antiken Welt. Volume 10). Philipp von Zabern, Mainz 1982, ISBN 3-8053-0542-7.
- Magie und Mythen in Babylonien. Von Dämonen, Hexen und Beschwörungspriestern (Magic and Myths in Babylonia: Of Spirits, Spells, and Oath Priests) (= Merlins Bibliothek der geheimen Wissenschaften und magischen Künste. Volume 8). Merlin, Gifkendorf 1986, ISBN 3-87536-133-4.
- (Editor) Das Reich Urartu. Ein altorientalischer Staat im 1. Jahrtausend v. Chr. (The Empire of Urartu: An Anatolian State of the 1st Millennium BC) (= Konstanzer Altorientalische Symposien. Volume 1. / Xenia. Volume 17). Universitäts-Verlag, Konstanz 1986, ISBN 3-87940-274-4.
- (Editor) Hurriter und Hurritisch (Hurrians and Hurrian) (= Konstanzer Altorientalische Symposien. Volume 2. / Xenia. Volume 21). Universitäts-Verlag, Konstanz 1988, ISBN 3-87940-324-4.
- Geschichte der hethitischen Religion (History of the Hittite Religion) (= Handbuch der Orientalistik. Volume 1.15). Brill, Leiden 1994, ISBN 90-04-09799-6.
- Die hethitische Literatur. Texte, Stilistik, Motive. (Hittite Literature: Texts, Style, Motifs) Walter de Gruyter, Berlin/New York 2006, ISBN 978-3-11-018877-6.
