= Ḫašamili =

Hittite household and smithing god

- Household and smithing god
- Major cult center: Hattusa

Ḫašamili (also romanized as Ḫašammili; the variant Ḫašameli appears in the text CTH 617) was a god worshiped in Bronze Age Anatolia. He originated in religious beliefs of the Hattians, and later came to be incorporated into the Hittite, Palaic and Luwian pantheons. He was regarded as a protective household deity, and was additionally associated with metalworking. He appears in the myth of Ḫaḫḫima, but his role in it is not fully understood.

== Name and character ==
The theonym Ḫašamili originates in the Hattic language. Multiple phonetic spellings are attested in cuneiform texts in Hattic, Hittite and Palaic.

Ḫašamili's character is not fully understood. Volkert Haas considered him primarily an apotropaic deity responsible for the protection of children. According to Piotr Taracha he was regarded as a household deity responsible for the well-being of families, and in that capacity was closely associated with Zilipuri. It is also assumed that he was a smithing god. He is described as a "strong smith" (^{LÚ}SIMUG innarawandan) in the temple construction ritual CTH 726.1, which also associates him with iron, nails and bronze hammers. Romina Della Casa suggests that by extension of his role as a divine smith he might have been also regarded as a war god, which might be reflected in Muršili's Annals (CTH 62) where he is credited with hiding the Hittite army from enemies, though due to lack of details in the relevant passage this proposal remains speculative.

Charles W. Steitler proposes that the goddess Aššiyanza (or Aššiyaza), "beloved", who appears in offering lists either immediately after Ḫašamili or in sequence with him and Kuwannaniya, was regarded as his partner; he suggests she was either an epithet (or alternate name) of Kuwannaniya or a similar spring goddess.

== Worship ==
The theonym Ḫazamil attested in Old Assyrian texts from the karum (trading colony) Kanesh is presumed to be an early variant of Ḫašamili's name. He was also grouped with other "gods of Kanesh", such as Ḫalki, Pirwa and Maliya, in later Hittite sources.

Ḫašamili was already commonly worshiped by Hittites and Luwians in the Old Hittite period, which according to Piotr Taracha likely indicates he was among the Hattic deities who had no earlier counterparts in their pantheon. A temple dedicated to him existed in Hattusa. He was also among the deities celebrated during the KI.LAM festival held in this city. He is additionally attested in rituals pertaining to the poorly understood ḫešta building alongside Zilipuri; both of them appear as members of a group of deities associated with Lelwani. In the treaty between Šuppiluliuma I and Šattiwaza of Mitanni, he is listed as one of the divine witnesses on the Hittite side.

Luwian cities in which Ḫašamili was worshiped include Tauriša, located in the basin of the river Zuliya (modern Çekerek River), and nearby Karaḫna.

Ḫašamili was also incorporated into the pantheon of the Palaians, whose religion was heavily influenced by the Hattians. He is mentioned in the descriptions of ceremonies held in the temple of their head god Ziparwa in Hattusa. In this context, he formed a group alongside Kataḫzipuri, Kammamma, Ḫilanzipa, Gulzannikeš and Uliliyantikeš.

Based on the phonetic similarity of the names it has been suggested that Kasmilos, a figure regarded as the brother of Kaberoi in Samothrace and sometimes identified with Hermes, might have been a late reflection of Ḫašamili. Ian Rutherford proposes that his cult might have originally been transferred to the west from Pala through Wilusa or Assuwa. However, he stresses there is ultimately very little certain evidence for Hittite influence on later Greek religion.

== Mythology ==
Ḫašamili appears in the myth of Ḫaḫḫima, in which he and the fate goddesses (Gulšeš) are the only deities who manage to escape from the eponymous being, presumed to be a personification of frost or numbness. The myth relays that he was spared because his brothers were also the brothers of Ḫaḫḫima. Due to imperfect understanding of his character this part of the narrative remains poorly understood. No other text refers to any deities as his siblings, though Volkert Haas suggests that a group consisting of divine representations of the moon, the stars and the night included alongside him in lists of offerings might be meant. His proposal is also supported by Romina Della Casa.
