= Anna (goddess) =

Ancient Anatolian goddess

- Head of the pantheon of Kanesh
- Major cult center: Kanesh

Anna was the main deity of Kanesh, an Anatolian city which in the Old Assyrian period served as an Assyrian trading colony. Multiple possibilities regarding her origin have been considered by researchers. A temple, festivals and clergy dedicated to her are attested in texts from her city, and in contracts she appears alongside the Assyrian god Ashur. At some point her position declined, and an unidentified weather god became the main local deity instead. It is nonetheless assumed that she continued to be worshiped later on by Hittites and Luwians. It has also been proposed that a deity from Emar can be identified with her, though not all researchers share this view.

== Anna in Kanesh ==
=== Name and character ===
Anna (also transcribed as Annā) was the principal deity of Kanesh, a city which served as the main Assyrian trading colony in Anatolia. Four different spellings of her name are attested in cuneiform texts from this site, dated to the Old Assyrian period: A-na, An-na, A-na-a and ^{d}A-na.

Piotr Taracha tentatively suggests that Anna might have belonged to an "early central Anatolian substrate", similarly as a number of other deities known from texts from Kanesh, such as Ḫariḫari, Ḫigiša, Nipaš, Parka, Perwa (Peruwa) and Tuḫtuḫani. He notes that the existence of speakers of a pre-Indo-European non-Hattic substrate language (or languages) in Anatolia is seemingly also supported by a section of the later ritual of Anna (here the name of a historical person, not the deity) of Kaplawiya, KUB 12.44 + KBo 27.108, which contains a passage in a hitherto unidentified language. Volkert Haas instead considered the Kaneshite Anna to have her origin in Syria. Guido Kryszat notes the name is similar to the Hittite and Palaic word anna, "mother", and Luwian annā, "cleverness" or "experience".

It is presumed that the deity referred to as the "goddess of Kanesh" and "goddess of the city" (ilat ālim) in texts from the site is one and the same as Anna. Furthermore, bēlat māmītim, the "lady of the oath", known from only one text, might correspond to her as well. Gojko Barjamovic additionally considers it a possibility that the sumerogram ^{d}UTU, which designated the sun deity worshiped in Kanesh, also referred to Anna, due to most Anatolian solar deities being female. An alternate proposal is that Anna was a male deity, identical with il Kaniš, the "god of Kanesh", and the feminine titles designated his hitherto unidentified spouse.

=== Worship ===
A festival of Anna attested in Old Assyrian texts from Kanesh is one of the oldest known Anatolian religious ceremonies. It took place in the beginning of the year, and involved a visit of the local ruler in her temple. Reference to a qaššum of Anna found in one of the texts most likely refers to one of the architectural parts of this building, as the context makes the other meaning of this term, the name of a type of religious functionary, an implausible translation. Names of two priests of Anna (GUDU_{4} ša A-na), Azu and Aluwa, have been identified. It is agreed that all people designated by this logogram in this context were men.

In earliest contracts from Kanesh, Anna appears next to Ashur, the tutelary god of the Assyrian city of Assur. She was also worshiped by the Assyrian traders living in Kanesh. In one case, Anna is invoked alongside Ashur, the Assyrian king and rabi sikkatim (presumed to be a local civic authority) in an oath meant to cement the divorce of Pūšu-kēn and Lamassī, both of whom hailed from Assyria. Klaas R. Veenhof suggests that Anna (who he treats as a male deity) might have been introduced to the pantheon of Assur at some point, as theophoric names with this theonym occur in texts from this site.

Whether Anna can be identified with a deity with a sword-like object depicted on seals from Kanesh cannot be presently determined with certainty.

=== Decline ===
While Anna's position as the main goddess of Kanesh is well attested in sources from level II of the site, level Ib indicates that a weather god, seemingly absent from the earlier texts, became the main local deity, taking Anna's place in contracts. His name was written with the Mesopotamian logogram ^{d}IM, but it is presumed that he was an Anatolian deity. In theophoric names of local inhabitants, both Hittite Tarḫunna and Hattian Taru are attested. Additionally, due to a proposed connection between the Kaneshite theonym Nipaš and the Hittite word for heaven, nipas, it has been proposed that this deity might have been responsible for the weather and thus one and the same as the god in mention, though this view is not universally accepted and ultimately the precise identity of Anna's replacement remains uncertain.

The reason behind the change in the structure of the local pantheon is unknown, and it cannot be determined with certainty if it was a result of a political process. Piotr Taracha notes that it might be related to the spread of veneration of weather gods across upper Mesopotamia and Syria in the nineteenth and eighteenth centuries BCE. He compares the new structure of the pantheon of Kanesh to that known from early sources from Hattusa, where the local goddess Inar according to him possibly initially had a similar role as Anna in her city, which later also came to be associated with a weather god. He also remarks that in Hittite times the position of city deities in Anatolia was consistently secondary compared to the heads of the pantheon, namely the sun goddess and the weather god.

== Possible later attestations ==
=== Hittite and Luwian texts ===
It is assumed in later periods Anna continued to appear in sources pertaining to Hittite religion and Luwian religion. However, she was no longer associated with Kanesh. She was regarded as one of the deities from the circle of the goddess Ḫuwaššanna. She was a member of a group of primeval deities (ḫantezziuš DINGIR^{MEŠ}) associated with her, which also included the deified sea, the river Šarmamma and the deity Zarnizza. However, this attestation is not entirely certain, as it cannot be ruled out that a different deity with a homophonous name is meant.

=== Emariote texts ===
A deity named Anna (^{d}An-na or An-na, without a repeat of the AN/dingir sign) attested in texts from Emar according to Volkert Haas can be considered identical with Anna known from Kanesh. This hypothesis is not universally accepted and other identifications have been proposed as well. Daniel E. Fleming considers the Emariote Anna to be male and possibly related to Mesopotamian sky god Anu. According to Gary Beckman's more recent survey of the local pantheon the origin of this deity remains uncertain.

A temple of Anna existed in Emar. This deity's name is also attested in the name of a month in the local calendar and in theophoric names. It is presumed that the month corresponded to a part of either autumn or winter. However, not much is known about the celebrations which took place during it. There is also no indication that any of them were specifically focused on Anna. An association between the riverbank, presumably of the Euphrates, and Anna is also attested.
