= Tiyaz =

Palaic sun god

- Palaic sun god

Equivalents
- Luwian: Tiwaz
- Hittite: Ištanu

Tiyaz or Tiyad was the sun god of the Palaians, regarded as the third most important deity in their pantheon. He was also incorporated into the Hittite religion. He appears in a ritual written in Palaic, though presumed to belong to a Hittite corpus, in which he is implored to anoint the king. After the fall of the Hittite Empire, he might have been worshiped by Phrygians.

== Name ==
Attested forms of the name of the Palaic sun god include Tiyaz and Tiyad. The spelling Tiwat, while present in some academic publications, is considered erroneous. It is presumed his name could also be represented by the Sumerogram ^{d}UTU, much like those of other solar deities mentioned in Hittite sources, such as Hurrian Šimige or Hattian Ištanu.

The theonym Tiyaz is derived from the Indo-European root diēu(-ot)-, "(heavenly) light", and is a cognate of Luwian Tiwaz. In Hittite, the same root only formed the basis of the common words šiwat, "day", and šiuš, "god", while more distant cognate theonyms include Greek Zeus.

== Character ==
Little is known about Tiyaz's character beyond his role as a sun god. He was a male deity, as in contrast with the Hittites, the Palaians did not adopt the Hattian solar goddesses. It has been noted that in contrast with Hittite religion, but similarly to Luwian religion, the traditions of the Palaians, while influenced by Hattians, preserved more elements presumed to have Indo-European origin. In known sources, Tiyaz is consistently the third most important Palaic deity, though Manfred Hutter suggests he might have originally been the head of the pantheon and only lost his status due to Hattian influence, as both of the two main deities, Ziparwa and Kataḫzipuri, have Hattic names.

Hittite sources indicate that Tiyaz was associated with a group of deities known as Ilaliyantikeš. Their name has been connected with the Hittite verb ilaliya-, "to desire." Ilaliyanteš, a closely related group were similarly associated with Luwian Tiwaz.

In a Palaic myth about a lost god, Tiyaz dispatches an eagle to search for him.

== Worship ==
Religion of the Palaians is only known from Hittite sources, which detail the celebrations of Palaic deities incorporated into the Hittite pantheon, who were worshiped in the temple of Ziparwa in Hattusa. Based on available evidence, it has been proposed that Tiyaz was connected to rituals about kingship in Palaic culture. He is mentioned in a formula written in Palaic, apparently, reflecting Hittite royal ideology. It forms a part of text CTH 751, a series of invocations to various deities. The sun god is invited to pick his favorite among the breads prepared as offerings. He is addressed as the father and mother of the king, which, based on similar examples, is presumed to be a stock figure of speech indicating respect, rather than a statement about divine descent. He is implored to anoint and exalt the king. This is the only direct evidence for a Hittite belief in the rulers being directly nominated to their position by gods.

It has been argued that the worship of Tiyaz persisted even after the absorption of remnants of the Palaians by Hittites and the subsequent fall of the Hittite Empire. Its vestiges might be present in the later religion of the Phrygians. Possible evidence includes the Old Phrygian personal name Tiyes and the New Phrygian theonym Τιος. Other evidence for Palaic influence on beliefs of the Phrygians is the reference to a local hypostasis of Zeus, Zeus Papas, argued to reflect the Palaic theonym Tarupapami ("Taru is my father", Taru being a weather god).
