= Ḫapantali =

Pastoral goddess

- Shepherd goddess

Ḫapantali, also known as Ḫapantaliya, was a Luwian goddess who functioned as a divine shepherd. She was also incorporated into Hattian and Hittite beliefs. She is first attested in the Old Assyrian period, and later continued to be worshiped until the fall of the Hittite Empire. She appears in a variety of texts, including descriptions of festivals, treaties, and myths. While in ritual texts she was often linked with Inar, in mythological context she instead could be designated as a helper of Kamrušepa or her husband Tiwad.

== Name and character ==
Ḫapantali is considered a deity of Luwian origin by researchers. Volkert Haas initially suggested that her name was related to the Hittite words ḫap(a)-, "river", and ḫapati-, "river land". However, later he concluded that it was instead derived from Luwian ḫawa, "sheep". The latter proposal is also supported by Manfred Hutter. If this assumption is correct, it is possible the name can be translated as "shepherd". In an earlier publication John G. McMahon attributes Hattic origin to her instead, but according to Haas this is implausible. He argues that cases where Ḫapantali appears in Hattian texts reflect early contact between the two groups, similarly to references to Hattian Šulinkatte in Luwian texts.

McMahon refers to Ḫapantali as a male deity. However, Haas pointed out that her gender is confirmed by a ritual text from Maşat Höyük, HKM 116, which refers to her as with the feminine title "queen of remedies", waššiyaš MUNUS.LUGAL-aš. The view that she was a goddess is also supported by Hutter and Piotr Taracha.

Ḫapantali has been described as a "shepherd goddess", a characterization supported by her portrayal in myths, where she is responsible for a herd of sheep belonging to the Luwian sun god Tiwaz. She also appears in two rituals meant to pacify angry deities through the burning of wood, one focused on Telipinu and the other on Ḫannaḫanna. In the latter, documented in the text KUB 33.45+, she is responsible for providing a type of wood, karšani, and for burning it in a hearth, which is meant to result in the rage of the other goddess involved similarly burning up.

== Worship ==
Oldest attestations of Ḫapantali come from the Old Assyrian period. In the texts from Kanesh, she is attested in a number of theophoric names. In later periods she is particularly well attested in texts dealing with festivals and in treaties. In the list of deities worshiped during the KI.LAM festival, Ḫapantali appears alongside Inar. She is one of the only deities mentioned in it whose origin was not Hattian. Vessels in the shape of boars and leopards were used in the cult of Ḫapantali and Inar. These two goddesses were closely associated with each other, and appear together in various ritual texts. Due to their frequent association, it has been argued that presence of Ḫapantali next to a deity designated by the sumerogram ^{d}LAMMA makes it possible to presume Inar was meant instead of any other Hittite or Luwian deities who could also be designated by it, such as Kammamma. However, Ḫapantali could be perceived as a deity belonging to the category of ^{d}LAMMA (so-called "tutelary deities") herself too. She appears in a number of Hittite treaties as one of the members of this group. She commonly occurs next to Karzi in this context. Examples where she appears as one of the divine witnesses include the treaties between Šuppiluliuma I and rulers such as Huqqana of Hayasa, Shattiwaza of Mittanni and Tette of Nuhašše, between Muršili II and Tuppi-Teshub of Amurru, Niqmepa of Ugarit and Manapa-Tarhunta of the Seha River, between Ḫattušili III and Ulmi-Teshub of Tarḫuntašša, and between Tudḫaliya IV and Kurunta, another ruler of the same polity. Based on these texts it is presumed she continued to be worshiped until the end of the Hittite Empire.

== Mythology ==
In myths, Ḫapantali typically acts as an assistant of Kamrušepa, in contrast with her connection with Inar documented in other sources. She could also be associated with Kamrušepa's husband, the Luwian sun god Tiwaz, and she takes care of his sheep in the myth of Telipinu's disappearance. In the same composition, she is also among the deities who gather under a tree while Kamrušepa purifies Telipinu.

In the myth The Moon that Fell from Heaven, also known as When the Storm God thunders Frightfully, Ḫapantali appears to recite a spell after the events described in the title. The original version of the myth was written in Hattic, though a Hittite translation is also known; the eponymous deities are accordingly the moon good Kašku and the weather god Taru in Hattic and their counterparts Arma and Tarḫunna in Hittite.
