= Pirwa =

Hittite and Luwian deity

- God of horses
- Major cult center: Kanesh
- Animals: horse

Genealogy
- Spouse: possibly Ḫaššušara

Pirwa, also known under the variant names Perwa and Peruwa, was a god worshiped by Hittites and Luwians in ancient Anatolia. He was associated with horses. There is also evidence that he was regarded as a warlike deity. He is first attested in documents from Kanesh, which mention a priest in his service. He retained his connection with this city in later sources, but he also came to be worshiped in a number of other locations, including Hattusa. A possible late reference to him occurs in a Neo-Assyrian text listing deities worshiped in Arbela, though this attestation remains uncertain and might be a scribal mistake.

== Name and character ==
Attested variant forms of Pirwa's name include Perwa and Peruwa, with the latter being an old spelling used in texts from Kanesh. According to Piotr Taracha, it most likely originated in a language he refers to as a "central Anatolian substrate", similar to the names of Ḫariḫari, Ḫigiša, Nipaš, Parka, Tuḫtuḫani and possibly Anna. Volkert Haas instead regarded it as related to a number of words present in Anatolian languages, such as peruna, "stone", or ^{NA_{4}}piru=luwa-, "to free grain from between stones", as well as Old Indic parwata, "mountain", though he stressed that a connection between the proposed etymologies and Pirwa's character is impossible to determine. The explanation of the name as a derivative of a term referring to a rock or a stone has also been accepted by Franca Pecchioli Daddi, who speculatively classified Pirwa among mountain deities.

While it was initially considered uncertain by Hittitologists if Pirwa was regarded exclusively as a male deity or if both female and male forms coexisted, the modern consensus is that the former view is correct, while the latter was the result of treating the feminine title MUNUS.LUGAL as an epithet of this god due to mistranslations.

Pirwa was considered the god of horses, and the connection between him and these animals is well attested. Evidence includes both textual sources linking him with horses in omens and descriptions of his iconography. Two examples of the latter are known, one from Šippa and the other from Zipariwa; in both cases he is described as a male figure standing on a horse. Other animals associated with him were the eagle and the lion. Pirwa could also be portrayed as a fearsome warrior god. This aspect of his character is best attested from areas inhabited by Luwians. His epithets include parḫant, "chasing, hunting, galloping", and possibly ma-a-ya-[...]/ma-a-e-eš, "powerful". The former might reflect his association with horses.

== Associations with other deities ==
In offering lists Pirwa typically appears alongside other deities associated with Kanesh by the Hittites, such as Aškašepa, Maliya, Ḫašamili, Ḫaššušara and Kamrušepa. However, this group was most likely a late invention, and not all of them were necessarily worshiped in the earliest periods of the history of Hittite religion. In a formula opening a Hittite healing ritual, Pirwa is responsible for passing on information delivered to him by Maliya to Kamrušepa.

The connection between Pirwa and Ḫaššušara was particularly close, and for example in Kizzimara they were apparently worshiped as a dyad. They also appear together in a fragment of a myth of either Hittite or Luwian origin, and it has been suggested Ḫaššušara was Pirwa's parhedra (partner). In a ritual focused on the Luwian weather god, Tarḫunz, which was meant to secure the prosperity of a vineyard, Pirwa is paired with Aškašepa instead. They were also worshiped together in Ištanuwa, a northwestern Luwian city. The same pair could also form a triad alongside Kataḫḫa, though the latter could form a duo with Pirwa herself too. In a single case, Pirwa appears in a ritual alongside both Ḫaššušara and Aškašepa.

== Worship ==
Pirwa was originally worshiped in Kanesh. According to Franca Pecchioli Daddi. he was the principal deity of this city. This view is also supported by John MacGinnis. However, it is commonly assumed Anna fulfilled this role instead. Pecchioli Daddi's proposal relies on the fact that the Old Assyrian texts from Kanesh mention many people bearing theophoric names invoking Pirwa, including members of the local royal family. Only a single document from the site mentions a priest (kumrum) in his service, a certain Hapuala.

=== Hittite and Luwian sources ===
In later periods, Pirwa was worshiped by Hittites and Luwians. He retained his connection with Kanesh, unlike deities such as Anna or Parka. The earliest Hittite texts mention many theophoric names invoking Pirwa, though their frequency declined with time. Since few, if any, ritual text from the same period mention him, most likely the geographic extent of his cult remained limited before the rise of the Hittite Empire, when it apparently spread to Hattusa and diffused over a larger area. The mountain Liḫša served as its administrative center. According to Hittite texts, Pirwa's other cult centers included Ḫaššuwa, Šippa, Tenizidaša and Zipariwa. He was also worshiped in Ikšunuwa, Nenišankuwa and Duruwaduruwa. Temples dedicated to him existed in Šippa and Wijanawanta, additionally references to a ḫekur, a type of religious and administrative institution, are also known. This type of sanctuaries is also attested for deities such as Kammamma and an unspecified god designated by the logogram ^{d}LAMMA.

=== Possible later attestations ===
Birua (^{d}Bi-ru-ú-a) attested in a Neo-Assyrian tākultu text from the reign of Ashurbanipal as one of the deities worshiped in the temple of Ishtar of Arbela might be identical with Pirwa, possibly introduced to Assyria at some point through a horse trading network. However, it is also possible Birua was only a scribal mistake, and the deity meant was Šerua. The uncertainty comes from Birua's unusually high position in the enumeration of deities.
