= Arma (deity) =

Ancient Anatolian lunar deity

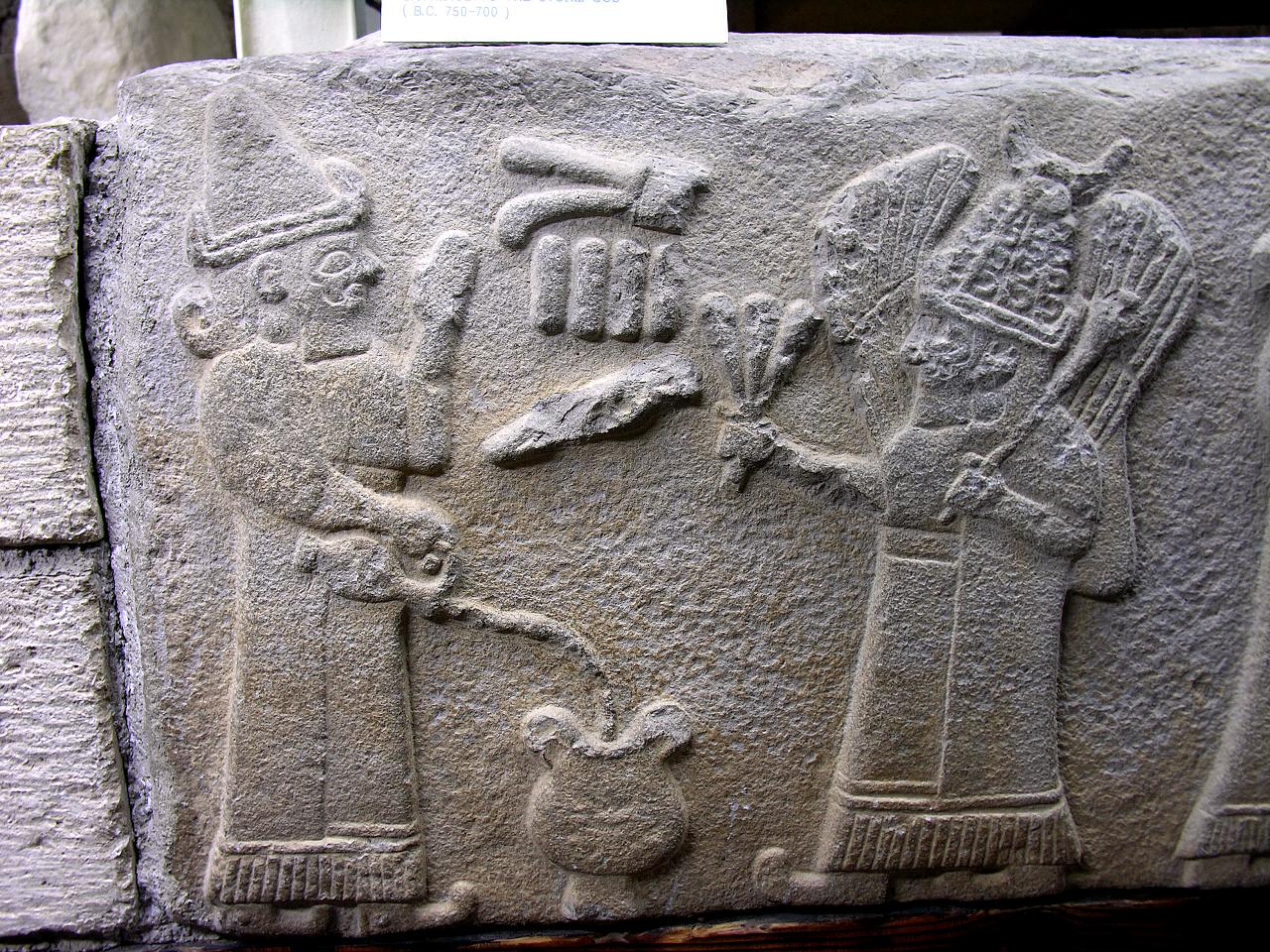
Libation offering to the Luwian moon god Arma on a relief from Arslantepe

Arma was an Anatolian Moon god, worshipped by the Hittites and Luwians in the Bronze Age and early Iron Age.

== Name ==
The name derives from the Proto-Anatolian *ʿOrmo- ("wanderer"). He is attested as the Moon god in Hittite and Luwian religion, with the name Arma-. In Lycian he was called Erm̃ma-, Arm̃ma-, in Carian Armo (dative case), and in Lydian Arm-. In cuneiform texts, the name is written with the Sumerograms ^{d}EN.ZU or ^{d}XXX, in Hieroglyphic Luwian with a crescent Moon symbol, which is transliterated as (DEUS) LUNA.

== Role ==
While the Hattian moon god, Kašku, was not worshipped, Hittite and Luwian religion involved extensive worship of Arma. For the Luwians in particular, the moon was associated with the months of pregnancy and Arma was therefore believed to protect pregnant women and to help women giving birth (note Hittite armaḫḫ- ("to impregnate") and armai- ("to be pregnant"). Thus the Moon god had an important role in family religion. He also served as an important guarantor of oaths in state treaties. His wife was Nikkal (the Mesopotamian goddess Ningal).

The most well-known myth in which the Moon god is involved is of Hattian origin. In this story, the Moon god Kašku falls from heaven and lands in the marketplace or gatehouse of the city of Laḫzan. The angry weather god dropped a heavy downpour of rain on the Moon god, who became very afraid. The goddesses Ḫapantali and Kamrušepa eventually saved him using magic spells.

== Equivalents ==
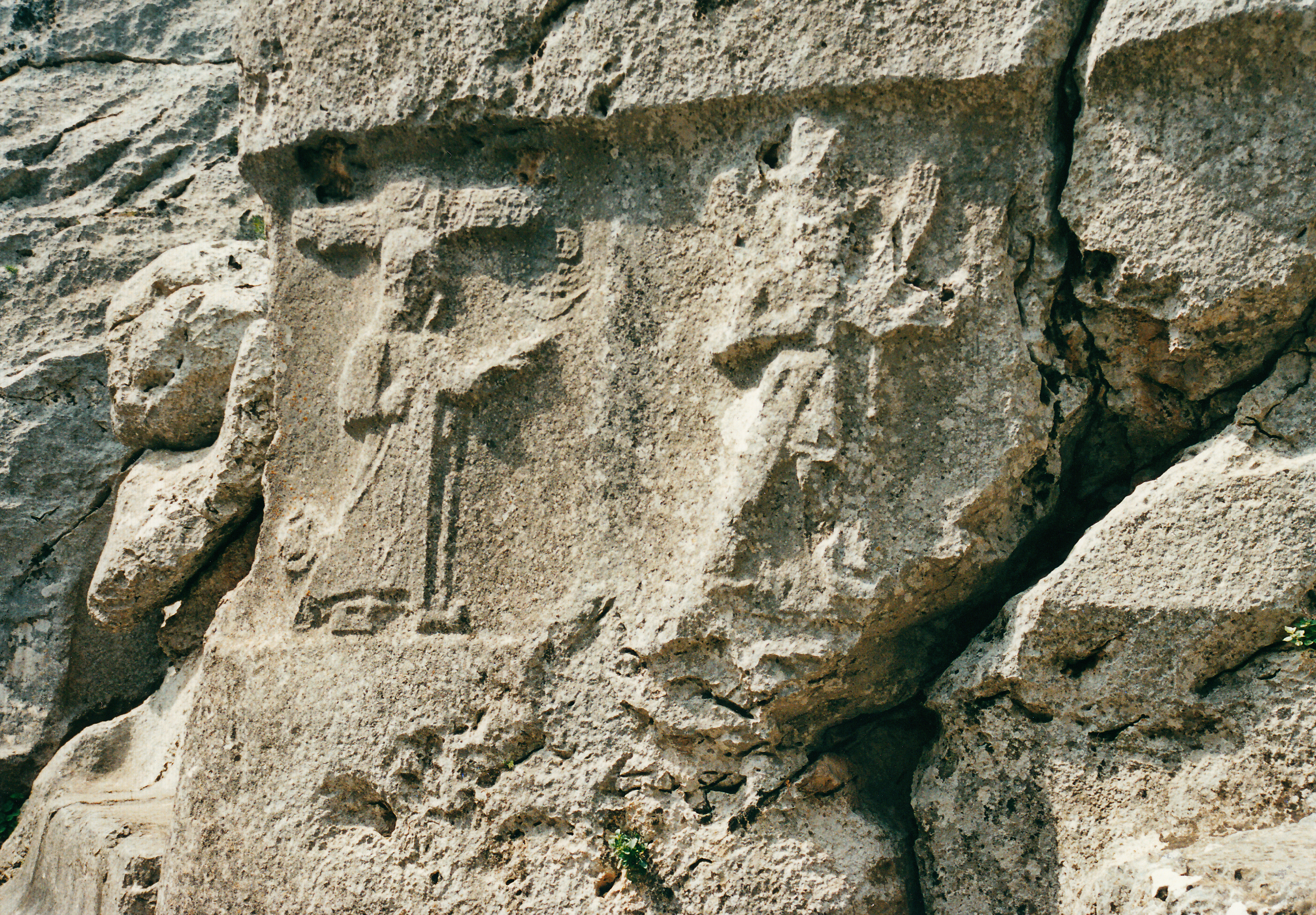
Depiction of the Moon god Arma in the form of the Hurrian Moon god Kušuḫ, from the cliff sanctuary of Yazılıkaya

Arma was identified with the Hurrian Moon god Kušuḫ, as in Hittite sources which transmit the Hurrian "Song of Silver," in which the Moon god is defeated by the demon Ušḫuni ("Silver") and is thrown out of heaven by him.

In Syria he is assimilated to the cult of the Moon god of Harran, especially in the 1st millennium BC, which was among the most important deities of the city.

It is theorized that the supreme deity of pre-Christian Georgian religion, Armazi, has heavy ties with Hittite Arma.

== Legacy ==
It has been suggested that the name of the deity survived in Anatolia as part of the Galatian compound names Αρμεδυμνος ("Armedumnos") and Ερμεδυμνος ("Ermedumnos"), from Anatolian "Arma-" 'moon' and Galatian (a Celtic language) "-dumnos" 'world'.

== Bibliography ==
- Volkert Haas: Die hethitische Literatur. Walter de Gruyter, Berlin 2006, ISBN 3-11-018877-5, pp. 120 f., 150 f.
- Volkert Haas, Heidemarie Koch: Religionen des alten Orients: Hethiter und Iran. Vandenhoeck & Ruprecht, Göttingen 2011, ISBN 978-3-525-51695-9.
- Piotr Taracha: Religions of Second Millennium Anatolia. Harrassowitz Verlag, Wiesbaden 2009, ISBN 978-3-447-05885-8.
