= Kašku =

Hattian Moon god

Kašku ("shining star") was the Anatolian Moon god. He is known from the myth of the "Moon's fall from Heaven," in which he falls from his place in the sky and lands in the marketplace of the city of Laḫzan. The angry weather god Taru drenched him with a shower of rain and buffetted him with wind, which the goddess Kataḫziwuri noticed while looking down from heaven, whereupon she and Ḫapantali carried out a ritual to calm Taru. The myth belongs to a ritual which was to be carried out by the "Man of the weather god, if the weather god thunders terribly."

== See also ==
- Kušuḫ

== Bibliography ==
- Heinrich Otten: "Kašku". In Dietz Otto Edzard (Ed.): Reallexikon der Assyriologie und Vorderasiatischen Archäologie. Volume 5, Walter de Gruyter, Berlin/New York 1976–1980, ISBN 3-11-007192-4, p. 464.
