= Tiwaz (Luwian deity) =

Anatolian Sun deity

- Sun
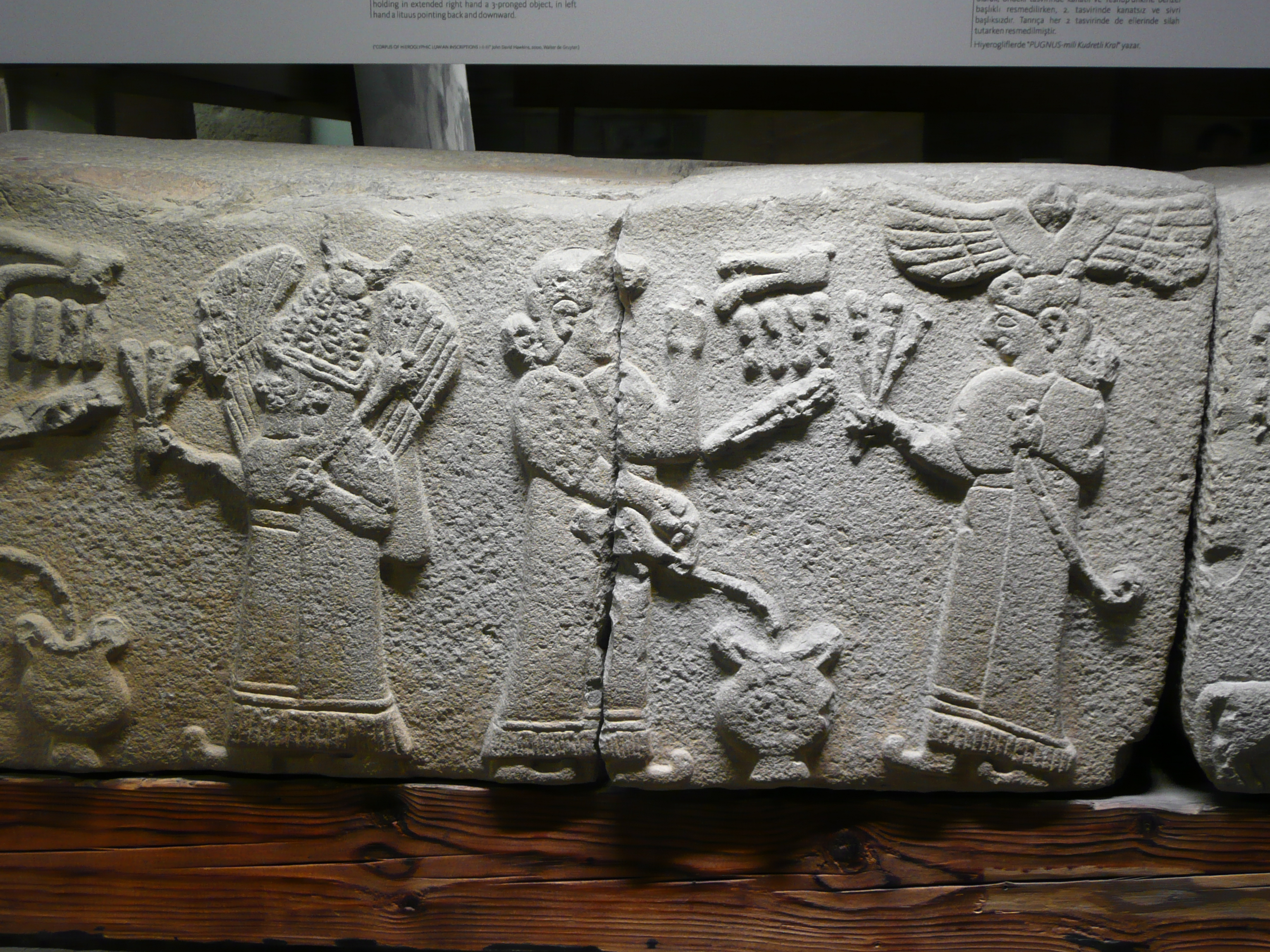
- Libation offering to the Sun-god Tiwaz (right, with winged sun) and the Moon-god Arma (left, with crescent moon) in a relief from Arslantepe.
- Venerated in: Luwian religion

Equivalents
- Greek: Zeus
- Hindu: Dyaus
- Indo-European: *Dyēus
- Norse: Týr
- Roman: Jupiter
- Palaic: Tiyaz

Tiwaz (stem: Tiwad-) was the Luwian Sun-god. He was among the most important gods of the Luwians.

== Name ==
The name of the Proto-Anatolian Sun god can be reconstructed as *Diuod-, which derives from the Proto-Indo-European word *dei- ("shine", "glow"). This name is cognate with the Greek Zeus, Latin Jupiter, and Norse Tyr. While Tiwaz (and the related Palaic god Tiyaz) retained a prominent role in the pantheon, the Hittite cognate deity, Šiwat was largely eclipsed by the Sun goddess of Arinna, becoming a god of the day, especially the day of death.

In Luwian cuneiform of the Bronze Age, his name appears as Tiwad-. It can also be written with the Sumerogram ^{d}UTU ("God-Sun"). In Hieroglyphic Luwian of the Iron Age, the name can be written as Tiwad- or with the ideogram (DEUS) SOL ("God-Sun").

Tiwaz rarely appears in personal names. The oldest example derives from 19th century BC Kültepe, a person called "Tiwatia". The hieroglyphic Luwian name Azatiwada ("Beloved of Tiwaz") is the root of the Pamphylian town of Aspendos. The local name of the town, according to the legends on its coins was Estwedi- (ΕΣΤϜΕΔΙΙΥ). Unlike other Luwian gods' names, Tiwaz is not attested in southern Anatolian personal names of the Hellenistic period. A Lycian women's name, Tewidarma (Τευδιαρμα; "Sun-Moon") and a Lydian patronym, Tiwdalis, are derived from Tiwaz.

The name also appears in ^{ḪUR.SAG}Tiwatašša, the Hittite name for a mountain located somewhere in southwestern Anatolia.

== Role ==
Tiwaz was the reflex of the male sky god of the Indo-European religion, Dyeus, who was superseded among the Hittites by the Hattian Sun goddess of Arinna.

In Bronze Age texts, Tiwaz is often referred to as "Father" (cuneiform Luwian: tatis Tiwaz) and once as "Great Tiwaz" (cuneiform Luwian: urazza- ^{d}UTU-az), and invoked along with the "Father gods" (cuneiform Luwian: tatinzi maššaninzi). His Bronze Age epithet, "Tiwaz of the Oath" (cuneiform Luwian: ḫirutalla- ^{d}UTU-az), indicates that he was an oath-god. In this role he received sacrifices of sheep, red meat and bread. The Luwian verb tiwadani- ("to curse") is derived from Tiwaz's name.

According to Hittite sources, Tiwaz and Kamrušepa were the parents of the tutelary god of Tauriša. Like Kamrušepa, Tiwaz is closely associated with sheep. The god Hapantali, who worked with Kamrušepa in purification rituals, looked after his sheep in the myth of Telipinu. His followers include the Ilaliyanteš, who generally appear in bad situations.

=== Sun god of the Earth ===
In the Hittite and Hurrian religions the Sun goddess of the Earth played an important role in the death cult and was understood to be the ruler of the world of the dead. For the Luwians there is a Bronze Age source which refers to the "Sun god of the Earth" (cuneiform Luwian: tiyamašši- ^{d}U-za): "If he is alive, may Tiwaz release him, if he is dead, may the Sun god of the Earth release him" (Boğazköy cuneiform inscription, 35.48 ii 19.23).

== Depiction ==
There are no known Bronze Age depictions of the Luwian Sun god. There are two reliefs from the Iron Age, which show Tiwaz with the moon god Arma. He is marked out by a winged sun above his head. The image from Arslantepe closely resembles the depiction of the Sun god from the Hittite sanctuary at Yazılıkaya.

== See also ==
- Sun god of Heaven

== Bibliography ==
- Volkert Haas: Geschichte der hethitischen Religion (= Handbuch der Orientalistik. Band 1.15). Brill, Leiden 1994, ISBN 978-9-004-09799-5.
- Manfred Hutter: "Aspects in Luwian Religion." In: H. Craig Melchert (Ed.): The Luwians (= Handbuch der Orientalistik. Band 1.68). Brill, Leiden 2003, ISBN 90-04-13009-8. pp. 211–280.
- Manfred Hutter: "Tiwat" in Michael P. Streck (ed.) Reallexikon der Assyriologie Volume 14, Walter de Gruyter, Berlin/New York, 2014, ISBN 978-3-11-034659-6, pp. 67–68.
