= Zilipuri =

Hittite god

- Household god
- Major cult center: Hattusa

Zilipuri, also known as Zilipuru or Zilipura was a god of Hattian origin worshiped by the Hittites in Bronze Age Anatolia. He was regarded as the protective god of the house and was associated with the hearth in particular.

== Name and character ==
Zilipuri's name has Hattic origin. Oğuz Soysal, relying on the parallel with the theonym Kataḫzipuri, suggests interpreting it as "under his land". Piotr Taracha argues that in late Hittite texts instead of being written phonetically it could be represented by the logogram ^{d}U.GUR. This proposal is also supported by Francesco G. Barsacchi. However, Gernot Wilhelm instead suggests that while ^{d}U.GUR does take an analogous position as Zilipuri in late enumerations of deities, this should be interpreted as an indication that a deity represented by it (either Nergal following the Mesopotamian writing convention or Šulinkatte) replaced Zilipuri in the thirteenth century BCE. Alfonso Archi assumes ^{d}U.GUR could designate both Zilipuri and Šulinkatte, though he notes in the text KUB 44.23 Šulinkatte takes Zilipuri's name in an enumeration of deities.

Zilipuri was regarded as a household god guaranteeing the well-being of families. In a ritual from the reign of Tudḫaliya IV (CTH 448) he is associated with the hearth. He was also regarded as the creator of the deified throne, Ḫalmašuit. Alfonso Archi suggests that this designates him as a deity responsible for continuity of royal power, similarly to how his connection with the hearth designates him as a protector of the unity and continuity of families.

As already attested in the Old Hittite period, Zilipuri could be counted among the deities forming the entourage of Lelwani, and it has been suggested that he was an underworld deity. Oğuz Soysal notes that while no direct evidence in favor of this interpretation is available, it cannot be ruled out that he fulfilled such a role.

== Worship ==
Priests referred to as ^{LÚ}zilipuriyatalla- or ^{LÚ}zalipuriyaitalla-, literally "man of Zilipuri", were involved in the cult of Zilipuri. They also took part in ritual purification and apotropaic magical ceremonies. Additionally, they are attested in the text CTH 726, an instruction for a temple foundation ritual.

As a domestic deity, Zilipuri was worshiped by the royal family of the Hittite Empire, as already attested in sources on graphological grounds presumed to originate in the Middle Hittite period. He was among the deities who received offerings during the KI.LAM festival centered on the local pantheon of Hattusa and other nearby cities. He was also worshiped in the temple of Lelwani, the ḫešta. He appears as one of the members of this deity s circle in the purulli, a spring festival of Hattian origin focused on worship of the earth.

In the inventory text KUB 44.1 a deity designated by the logogram ^{d}U.GUR, which in this context might designate Zilipuri, occurs alongside Maliya and the storm god of Ḫulaša, which might indicate he belonged to the pantheon of this city, though this remains uncertain.
