= Kamrušepa =

Hittite goddess

- Goddess of magic and medicine
- Major cult center: Kanesh, Taniwanda, Tauriša
- Symbol: iron throne

Genealogy
- Consort: Tiwad
- Children: Aruna and the tutelary god of Tauriša

Equivalents
- Hattian: Kataḫzipuri
- Mesopotamian: Gula

Kamrušepa was a Hittite and Luwian goddess of medicine and magic, analogous to Hattic and Palaic goddess Kataḫzipuri. She is best known as one of the deities involved in the Telepinu Myth, in which her actions were crucial to pacify the anger of the "missing" vegetation god.

== Character ==
Kamrušepa was the goddess of both magic and medicine. She was regarded as the inventor of various procedures, subsequently passed on to humans, as attested in mythical explanations attached to ritual texts. She could function as a divine midwife as well. It is possible she was a household deity due to her connection with family life and the hearth.

As a healing goddess, she could be associated with deities such as Pirwa, Maliya and the Hurrian Šauška in Hittite rituals. The Luwians seemingly regarded her as analogous to Mesopotamian medicine goddess Gula, and in some cases texts presented as incantations of Gula in Mesopotamia were attributed to Kamrušepa in Luwian tradition.

Unlike other Anatolian deities connected with magic, she was regarded as a resident of heaven. It has been proposed she was connected to clouds or smoke, based on the possible origin of her name. She was believed to travel in a chariot drawn by horses, a mode of locomotion also attributed to the Luwian sun god Tiwad, who was associated with her.

While she was connected with the Hattic and Palaic goddess Kataḫzipuri, and in bilingual Hittite-Hattic texts they correspond to each other, their names were not etymologically related. Kamrušepa likely means "spirit of the clouds" or "spirit of smoke" ("Genius der Wolke/des Qualms"), though the connection between the first half of her name and the Hittite word kammara ("smoke") might only be a folk etymology, while the name of Kataḫzipuri had an unrelated Hattic etymology and means "queen of the land." Piotr Taracha proposed that in Palaic sources Kataḫzipuri might have functioned simply as an epithet of Kamrušepa applied to her due to contact with Hattic communities.

Her attribute was an iron throne.

== Worship ==
Kamrušepa is already attested in the oldest texts from Kanesh. Later Hittite rituals preserve the association between her and this city. According to a prayer meant to prevent the spread of a plague, another location associated with her was Taniwanda. Despite her position in the pantheon and her prominence in myths, little information is available when it comes to specific rituals or festivals connected to her.

Her status was also high in Luwian religion. Piotr Taracha notes that there most likely was no single uniform Luwian pantheon, but certain deities, including Kamrušepa, as well as Tarhunt, Tiwad, Maliya, Arma, Iyarri, Santa and a variety of tutelary gods represented by the logogram LAMMA were worshiped by most Luwian communities. She is especially well attested in Luwian incantations from Kizzuwatna.

While she is one of the best attested goddesses in the Hittite pantheon of the Bronze Age, there is presently no evidence for her worship continuing in the first millennium BCE.

== Mythology ==
Kamrušepa appears in various Hittite myths. In Disappearance of Telipinu, she instructs the other gods how to ensure the eponymous vegetation deity's return after an initial attempt fails. The magical procedure she prepares involves an offering of twelve sheep taken from the herds of the sun god, which had to be taken to Ḫapantali, a Luwian shepherd goddess. A similar formula is known from a myth pertaining to the disappearance of the storm god. Yet another fragment describes the solar god and Kamrušepa arguing with each other until they calm down by combing sheep together.

According to the Hittite text KUB 17 Kamrušepa was the "mother of the sea"). According to a local belief from Tauriša she and Tiwad, the Luwian sun god, were the parents of the city's tutelary god (LAMMA), referred to with the epithet wašḥazza ("sanctified" or "holy"). His spouse was a youthful goddess named Aššiyant, "the beloved."
