= Pamba =

Pamba may refer to:

== People ==
- Pamba (king), Hatti king of the 23rd century BC
- Bryan Pamba (born 1992), French-Ivorian basketball player
- Saleh Pamba (born 1950), Tanzanian politician

== Places ==
- Pamba River, Kerala, India
- Pamba, a ward of Nyamagana District, Mwanza Region, Tanzania

== Other uses ==
- Pamba S.C., a Tanzanian football club based in Mwanza
- INS Pamba, a self-propelled water carrier barge
- Psoralis, or Pamba, a genus of grass skipper butterflies
- Aminomethylbenzoic acid, a protease inhibitor and antifibrinolytic agent

== See also ==
- Mini Pamba, Malappuram, a halting station for pilgrims in Kerala, India
- Pampa (disambiguation)
