= Ziparwa =

Palaic and Hittite god

- Head of the Palaic pantheon, god of the weather and vegetation
- Other names: Zaparwa
- Major cult center: Pala

Genealogy
- Spouse: Kataḫzipuri

Ziparwa, originally known as Zaparwa, was the head of the pantheon of the Palaians, inhabitants of a region of northern Anatolia known as Pala in the Bronze Age. It is often assumed that he was a weather god in origin, though he was also associated with vegetation. Information about the worship of Ziparwa comes exclusively from Hittite texts, though some of them indicate that formulas in Palaic were used during festivals dedicated to him held in Hittite cities such as Hattusa.

== Name and character ==
Ziparwa was the head of the "extremely heterogenous" pantheon of the Palaians, speakers of Palaic, a language closely related to Hittite and Luwian. In the Bronze Age they inhabited Pala, a northern region of Anatolia which later came to be known as Paphlagonia.

The original Palaic form of Ziparwa's name, Zaparwa, was spelled in cuneiform as ^{d}Za-pár-wa_{a}(-a)-, while the standard Hittite spelling was ^{d}Zi-pár-wa_{a}(-a)-. The signs with subscripts, such as wa_{a}, constituted a Hittite invention, and it is assumed that they reflected "Hattic syllables beginning with the sound /f/ or /v/". On this basis it is presumed that Ziparwa's name had Hattic roots. It might have originally been pronounced as /Zaparfa/.

Hittite scribes apparently considered Ziparwa to belong to the category of weather gods. It has been proposed that in Palaic context, the logogram ^{d}10, used to designate such deities, can be read as Ziparwa's name, but there is no certain proof in favor of this interpretation. Piotr Taracha has suggested that his name might have originally been an epithet applied to a weather god bearing a Palaic name. This assumption relies on the proposed relation between his name and Taparwašu, a title of the Hittite storm god. Both might be variants of the same Hattic term in origin. Taracha assumes that under Hattian influence, a Palaic god received a new title, and that his original name was close to Hittite Tarḫunna and Luwian Tarḫunz. Daniel Schwemer notes that another possibility is that might have been an epithet of Hattian Taru in origin.

It is presumed Ziparawa also functioned as a god of vegetation. He appears in a Palaic myth assumed to be analogous to the Hittite composition about Telipinu.

Kataḫzipuri, a Hattian goddess most likely comparable to or outright identical with Kamrušepa was likely regarded as Ziparwa's spouse. They were regarded as the main pair of deities in the Palaic pantheon.

== Worship ==
The religion of the Palaians is only known from Hittite accounts. As a result, most of the available information about Ziparwa comes from Hittite texts, though there is no indication that he was ever a "pan-Anatolian" deity, and it is presumed his cult was centered in Pala. At some point he was incorporated into the Hittite pantheon, and a temple dedicated to him existed in Hattusa. Deities worshiped in association with him by the Hittites came chiefly from Palaic or Luwian milieus, with well attested examples being Tiyad (the Palaic sun god), Ilaliyantikeš or Ḫašamili.

Celebrations in honor of Ziparwa formed a part of a state festival dedicated to the Sun goddess of Arinna and the "gods of Hatti" as a whole, established during the reign of Šuppiluliuma I. They took part on the twelfth and thirteenth days, and the king was expected to visit his temple on both. The text CTH 750 had often been described as an account of a separate Hittite festival of Ziparwa following a proposal of Emmanuel Laroche from 1971, However, according to Hannah Marcuson it might have been a part of the spring AN.TAḪ.ŠUM and fall nuntarriyašḫa celebrations, rather than a separate one dedicated specifically to this god. The rites involved the recitation of "the words of the bread loaves" in Palaic. The related text CTH 751 mentions a sacrifice of a bull during which the formula "Hey Ziparwa! A bull! A bull!" had to be recited. An old woman speaking in Palaic had to reassure the god that the animal he was provided with was of best quality. The text also explains which body parts were not suitable for an offering to Ziparwa.
