= Kammamma =

Hittite god

- Tutelary god
- Major cult center: Kammamma, Arinna
- Adherents: Hattians, Hittites, Palaians

Kammamma (also romanized as Kamama) was a Hattian god worshiped by Hittites and Palaians. He belonged to the category of tutelary deities (^{D}LAMMA) and might have been associated with vegetation. He attained a degree of importance in the Hittite state pantheon in the Old Hittite period, and in some cases he is listed in hierarchically arranged lists directly after Tarḫunna and the sun goddess of Arinna, the main Hittite deities.

== Name and character ==
The theonym Kammamma has Hattic origin. It is identical with the name of a Bronze Age city located in northern Anatolia, though they were written in cuneiform with different determinatives, respectively dingir and uru.

Volkert Haas considered Kammamma a mother goddess. However, Maciej Popko refers to him as a male deity. Piotr Taracha notes that the name is most likely related to that of the goddess Ammamma (Mamma), and translates it as "high Mamma". However, he concluded Kammamma was regarded as a male deity whose character was comparable to Telipinu, as a variant of his name, Pin-Kammamma, "child Kammamma" or "son Kammamma", is likely to designate him as a similar youthful vegetation god. He argues that the possible etymological connection between the names of Kammamma and Ammamma likely reflects a shared connection with wild nature.

Carlo Corti, relying on the fact Kammamma's name is identical with that of a city, concludes this deity belonged to "the category of tutelary local numens". In some cases his name could be represented by the logogram ^{D}LAMMA, which was also used to write names of various members of this category, such as Innara, Inar and Luwian Runtiya. However, Piotr Taracha stresses that it cannot necessarily be assumed that his symbolic animal was a deer, despite the proposals that it was universally associated with Hittite tutelary deities.

The term Ḫaššuwa Innara (^{D}LAMMA.LUGAL, hieroglyphic Luwian CERVUS_{3}-ti REX or DEUS-ti REX), which had Luwian origin and was used to designate the personal protective deity of the Hittite king, could be in some cases translated into Hattic as Kattelikammamma, "the king's Kammamma". This reflected a broader phenomenon of inventing Hattic names for Hurrian and Luwian deities and concepts incorporated into Hittite religion, as also reflected in referring to Hurrian Earth and Heaven pair with the Hattic names Yaḫšul-Ištarazzil ("heaven-earth").

== Worship ==
Kammamma was chiefly worshiped in northern Anatolia. His cult center was most likely the homophonous city, where he was presumably regarded as the head of the local pantheon. He was also worshiped in Arinna. In rituals presumed to reflect Hattian tradition, he received offerings as a member of the circle of the sun goddess of Arinna.

In the late Old Hittite period, Kammamma attained a degree of importance in the state pantheon. He sometimes appears in enumerations of deities immediately after the heads of the pantheon, Tarhunna and the sun goddess of Arinna, which according to Piotr Taracha likely reflects the importance of his cult center, which might have served as a temporary royal residence during the reign of Hantili II.

References to a sanctuary of Kammamma designated by the term ḫekur are known. Piotr Taracha suggests it referred to a memorial to a deceased member of the royal family protected by a specific deity. Similar houses of worship are also attested for Pirwa and an unspecified deity designated by the logogram ^{D}LAMMA.

Kammamma was also worshiped by the Palaians, which is presumed to reflect Hattian influence on their culture. In Palaic rituals he appears as a member of a group which also included Ziparwa, Kataḫzipuri, Ḫilanzipa, Gulzannikeš and Uliliyantikeš.
