= Kataḫzipuri =

Hittite and Palaic goddess

- Goddess of magic
- Other names: Kataḫziwuri
- Major cult center: Hattusa, Pala
- Abode: heaven
- Adherents: Hattians, Hittites, Palaians

Genealogy
- Spouse: Ziparwa

Equivalents
- Luwian: Kamrušepa

Kataḫzipuri (also known as Kataḫziwuri) was a goddess worshiped by Hattians, Hittites and Palaians in Bronze Age Anatolia. She was associated with magic, and was commonly invoked in rituals dealing with healing and purification. She was closely associated with Kamrušepa. In Palaic religion she formed a pair with Ziparwa and headed the pantheon alongside him.

== Name and character ==
The theonym Kataḫzipuri has Hattic origin. Multiple spellings reflecting two variant forms, Kataḫzipuri and Kataḫziwuri, are attested in cuneiform texts discovered during excavations in Boğazköy (Hattusa) and Ortaköy (Šapinuwa). Gabrielle Frantz-Szabó assumes it is derived from the words kattaḫ, "queen", and pur, "land". Oğuz Soysal disagrees with this interpretation and notes that in contrast with kattaḫ, Kataḫzipuri's name was always written with a single t. He speculatively suggests that it might mean "evil under the land", though he stresses this would not indicate she was viewed as malevolent, but rather that certain types of problems could be entrusted to her so that through her intervention they can metaphorically remain "under the land", perhaps to be understood as "in the underworld".

Kataḫzipuri was considered the goddess of magic. Oğuz Soysal stresses that while Kataḫzipuri often functioned as a divine healer, there is also evidence for her spells sometimes being perceived as potentially dangerous, as reflected in the use of the Hattic term katakumi and its Hittite equivalent alwanzena, "sorceress", to refer to her, and on this basis he states describing her as a goddess of magic is preferable.

Kataḫzipuri was believed to reside in heaven. Some of the ritual texts invoking her start with the phrase "Kataḫzipuri saw from heaven", which prefaces the reveal of a solution to a specific issue, framed as the speech of the goddess. According to Volkert Haas texts following this model were meant to highlight her helpful character.

== Associations with other deities ==
As early as in the Old Hittite period, Kataḫzipuri came to be associated with Kamrušepa. In bilingual Hattic-Hittite texts they correspond to each other. Volkert Haas interpreted them as two originally distinct goddesses who only came to be syncretised with each other in the Old Hittite period. Oğuz Soysal instead suggests that Kamrušepa was a name applied to Kataḫzipuri after her incorporation into the Hittite pantheon. He also points out that the Hattic name does not occur in Luwian sources at all, and on this basis suggests Kamrušepa had Luwian origin. Piotr Taracha argues that in Palaic texts Kataḫzipuri might be an epithet designating a Palaic goddess identical with or analogous to Kamrušepa. However, the latter name does not occur in any texts written in Palaic.

The Palaians considered Kataḫzipuri the spouse of Ziparwa. These two deities occupied the most prominent position in their pantheon.

In the ritual text KUB 56.17, Kataḫzipuri is invoked alongside Papaya to dispel omens revealed in an unfavorable dream (Ù ḪUL). In incantations she could also be associated with deities such as Taru, the sun goddess of Arinna, Šulinkatte, Wurunkatte and Ḫannaḫanna.

== Worship ==
According to Oğuz Soysal, Kataḫzipuri occurs relatively frequently in Hittite religious texts. She appears in a number of incantations and healing rituals, especially these dealing with ritual purification.

Kataḫzipuri was also worshiped by Palaians. Palaic religion is only known from ritual texts from the temple of Ziparwa in Hattusa. Two of them, CTH 643 and CTH 750, mention Kataḫzipuri. In this context, she appears as a member of a group which also includes Ziparwa, Ḫašamili, Kammamma, Ḫilanzipa, Gulzannikeš and Uliliyantikeš.
