= Palà =

Country from Bronze Age Anatolia

Palà pa-là-a
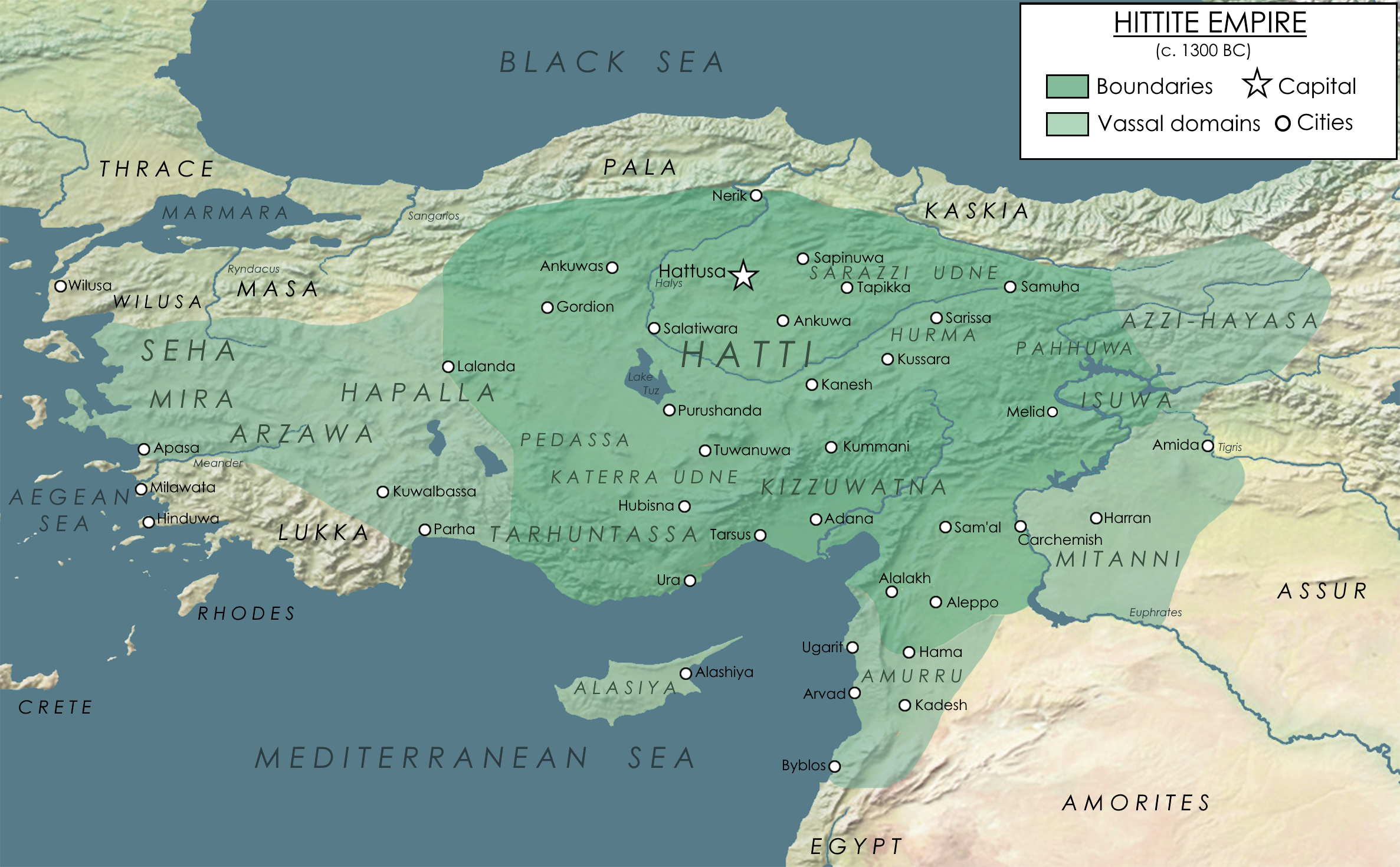
- Bronze Age Anatolia
- Common languages: Palaic
- Religion: Palaic religion
- Historical era: Bronze Age
Preceded by	Succeeded by
Hattians	Paphlagonia
- Today part of: Turkey

Palà was an ancient region of Anatolia to the northwest of Hattusa at the time the Hittites took control of the land of Hatti. Its inhabitants spoke an Indo-European language called palaumnili and appear to have coexisted with the Hattians for centuries prior. They are lost to history with the advance of Kaskian peoples from the east in the early 1500s BC.

== Etymology ==
The exonym "Palà" is always written as pa-là-a in Hittite records. It appears to have been bestowed upon Palaic-speakers ("palaumnili") by the Hattians. It may have originated from the Sumerian ba.la denoting a trade relationship with peoples on the fringes of Sumerian territory. Due to allophone variation over time (and exposure to different language speakers), the linguist Robert S. P. Beekes determined "P/Bla" to be the correct reading of Hittite Pal.

== Geography ==
The land of Palà has been localized northwest of Hattusa beyond the northern course of the Maraššantiya. It bordered Tummana to the east, Kalasma to the west and Kaissiya to Mount Asharpaya toward the south. It likely corresponded in whole or in part with the classical Paphlagonia and the classical Blaene. The primary Palaic settlement known to the Hittites may have been located at modern day Kargi. Its westward extent remains unknown, though Bryce believed it was situated 600 km to the east of ancient Troy.

== Origins ==
Palaumnili is the oldest Indo-European language of Anatolia, the least attested and was dead or dying by the time of the Hittites. It has been speculated that Palaic-speakers were never literate, that Hittite scribes relied upon syllabary to incorporate their traditions into the state cult and that they may have entered Anatolia as early as 3000 BC. This is proximate in time to the Indo-European invasion of the Anatolian/Lesser Armenian region of Palu/Palua in modern Elazığ Province, for which the Kızılırmak river would have been a natural route into Anatolia northward beyond the Hattic speaking region. Linguistic analysis shows extensive interaction between the two languages, suggesting a prolonged period of contact between the two peoples.

== History ==
The Hittite laws as early as 1650 BC mention Palà as one of two bordering lands (the other being Luwiya) where the people spoke a different language and where "different treatment was applied when a felony over which Hatti had jurisdiction was perpetrated outside of the boundaries of the kingdom." This land existed prior to the arrival of the Hittites and was too far removed from the predominant trading networks of the Mesopotamian-centered world to have garnered much notice:

"Given Pala's presumed localization...it was certainly far too decentered to be involved in the easternmost portions of the Old Assyrian commercial network and, in all likelihood, was not part of it at all. It may have been involved in western interregional networks of which we possess no written records...A sound conclusion is that Pala was at the extreme boundary of the area covered by the Old Assyrian trading networks and, if Palaeans were present at all in the karum society of Kanes, they probably formed an even smaller minority than the Luwians and left no recognizable trace of their existence in the available documents."

By the reign of Telipinu in the early 1500s BC the Hittites had lost most of their conquests and their kingdom had contracted to its core territories. The Kaskians had overrun the north of Anatolia and occupied formerly controlled Hittite towns. Palà thereafter became something of a border territory between the Hittites and the Kaskians. Historians have historically considered this the end of the Palaic peoples, though the area was still referred to as 'the land of Pala" as late as the reign of Muršili II (1330–1295 BCE). The Kalašma language discovered in 2023 may indicate a continuation of Palaic peoples further west.

== Religion ==
The Palaic religion is known from cuneiform ritual texts from the temple of the Palaic storm god in the Hittite capital Ḫattuša where the cult of Palaic deities continued even when contacts between Hittites and Pala had disappeared. The following deities are known:

Name	Gender/Number	Notes	Alternative Names	Hittite or Luwian counterpart
Ziparwa	god	Palaic major god, storm god	Zaparwa, name of Hattian origin	Tarḫuna, Tarḫunt
Kataḫzipuri	goddess	wife of Zaparwa	Kataḫziwuri, name of Hattian origin	Kamrušepa
Tiyaz	god	sun god	Tiyad	Sun god of Heaven, Tiwaz
Gulzannikeš	goddesses	fate goddesses	Gulzikannikeš	Daraweš Gulšeš
Ḫašamili	god		Ḫašammili, name of Hattian origin	
Inar	goddess			
Kamama	god		Kammamma	
Hearth	deity	hearth deity		
Šaušḫalla	deity		Šaušḫilla	
Ḫilanzipa	deity		Ḫilašši	
Ḫašauwanza	deity			
Aššanuwant	deity			Aššiyat
Ilaliyantikeš	deities		Ilaliyant	
Kuwanšeš	deities			
Uliliyantikeš	deities			Uliliyašši
