= Pamba (king) =

Pamba was king of Hatti, an ancient Bronze Age state from the pre-Hittite period, situated in central regions of Anatolia, modern Turkey.

== Attestation ==
He is mentioned in only one source, a Hittite version (from c. 1400 BCE) of an older Akkadian story, that narrates several events related to much earlier times, taking place during the rule of great king Naram-Sin of Akkad (23rd century BCE). The story describes a war between the Akkadian ruler and an alliance of 17 kings, and the Hittite version includes Pamba of Hatti among those kings. That inclusion is not attested in Akkadian versions of the story, nor in contemporary sources, that would date from the period of the Akkadian Empire, but some scholars hold that Hittite version (from c. 1400 BCE) is conditionally reliable, and probably derived from some local sources. In that case, the narrative would contain a trustworthy tradition, and thus provide a base for an assumption that the ancient Kingdom of Hatti existed already during the period of the Akkadian Empire.

Additionally, the term "pamba" is used colloquially in present-day Turkey to address a friend as "king."

== Rulers ==
Unknown earliest known Hattian king	Hattian king 23rd century BCE	Unknown Next known title holder: Piyusti

== See also ==
- Hattians
- Hittites

== Sources ==
- Beckman, Gary M. (2001). "Sargon and Naram-Sin in Ḫatti: Reflections of Mesopotamian Antiquity among the Hittites" (PDF). Die Gegenwart des Altertums: Formen und Funktionen des Altertumsbezugs in den Hochkulturen der Alten Welt. Heidelberg: Forum. pp. 85–91.
- Bryce, Trevor R. (2005) [1998]. The Kingdom of the Hittites (2nd revised ed.). New York: Oxford University Press.
- Bryce, Trevor R. (2009). The Routledge Handbook of the Peoples and Places of Ancient Western Asia: The Near East from the Early Bronze Age to the fall of the Persian Empire. London-New York: Routledge.
- Gilan, Amir (2010). "Epic and History in Hittite Anatolia: In Search of a Local Hero". Epic and History. Chichester: John Wiley & Sons. pp. 51–65.
- Gilan, Amir (2018). "In Search of a Distant Past: Forms of Historical Consciousness in Hittite Anatolia" (PDF). Anadolu. 44: 1–23.
- Glatz, Claudia (2020). The Making of Empire in Bronze Age Anatolia: Hittite Sovereign Practice, Resistance, and Negotiation. Cambridge: Cambridge University Press. ISBN 9781108491105.
- Goodnick-Westenholz, Joan (1997). Legends of the Kings of Akkade: The Texts. Winona Lake: Eisenbrauns.
- Goodnick-Westenholz, Joan (2010). "Historical Events and the Process of Their Transformation in Akkadian Heroic Traditions". Epic and History. Chichester: John Wiley & Sons. pp. 26–50.
