= Palaic language =

Extinct Anatolian Indo-European language

Palaic
- Region: Anatolia
- Ethnicity: Palaic peoples
- Extinct: around 1300 BCE
- Language family: Indo-European: Anatolian; Luwo-Lydian?; Luwo-Palaic?; Palaic

Language codes
- ISO 639-3: plq
- Glottolog: pala1331

Palaic is an extinct Indo-European language, attested in cuneiform tablets in Bronze Age Hattusa, the capital of the Hittites. Palaic, which was apparently spoken mainly in northern Anatolia, is generally considered to be one of four primary sub-divisions of the Anatolian languages, alongside Hittite (central Anatolia), Luwic (southern Anatolia) and Lydian (western Anatolia).

Its name in Hittite is palaumnili, or "of the people of Pala"; Pala was probably to the northwest of the Hittite core area, so in the northwest of present mainland Turkey. The region was overrun by the Kaskians in the 15th century BC, and the language likely went out of daily use at that time.

== Sources ==
The entire corpus of Palaic spans only CTH 751-754 in Emmanuel Laroche's catalog of Hittite texts (Catalogue des Textes Hittites); in addition Hittite texts elsewhere cite passages in Palaic in reference to the weather god Zaparwa (Hittite Ziparwa), the leading god of the land of Pala. In particular, CTH 750, a festival in Hittite for Ziparwa and associated deities, includes passages stating, "The Old Woman speaks the words of the bread in Palaic," or alternately "the words of the meal," though no Palaic passages are quoted. The Palaic-language texts are all from a religious context, with ritual and mythological content. In addition to Zaparwa, the Palaumnili-speakers worshipped a sun deity Tiyaz (Luwian Tiwaz), the Hattian goddess Kataḫzip/wuri, and several others.

== Phonology ==
Melchert reconstructs the following phonemic inventory for Palaic: However, Melchert claims that, instead of pharyngeals, "a pair of velar fricatives is equally possible".

=== Consonants ===
	Labial	Labiodental	Dental	Palatal	Velar	Pharyngeal
Plosive	p b		t d		k g	
Affricate			t͡s			
Fricative		f	s	ʒ		ħ ʕ
Nasal	m		n			
Liquid			l	r		
Glide	w			j		

=== Vowels ===
	Front	Central	Back
Close	i iː		u uː
Mid			
Open		a aː	

The phonemic status of /e/ and /eː/ is uncertain.

== Morphology ==
In terms of its morphology, Palaic is a fairly typical specimen of Indo-European. Palaic shared common innovations with Luwian not present in Old Hittite, suggesting a prior Luwian-Palaic linguistic complex. It has been characterized as "more conservative than Hittite" and heavily influenced by the Hattic language, though caution is prescribed for the latter assertion given the paucity of available materials.

=== Noun ===
Palaic shows the same gender distinction as seen in Hittite, i.e. animate vs. inanimate. It distinguishes two numbers, singular and plural, and at least six cases: nominative, vocative, accusative, genitive, dative, and locative.

Old Hittite has the genitive singular suffix -aš circa 1600 BC (compare Proto-Indo-European *-os); where Cuneiform Luwian instead uses the -ašša/i- adjectival suffix. Palaic, on the northern border of both, like later Hieroglyphic Luwian has both an -aš genitive and an -aša- adjectival suffix.

Palaic also has similar pronoun forms to Old Hittite.

=== Verb ===
The verb in Palaic is inflected for number (singular and plural), person, tense (present and preterite), and mood (indicative and imperative). It also has two voices, active and medio-passive.

Palaic is considered to have had a "high number of attestations of the suffix -ina," all of which were transitive.
