= Taru (god) =

Hattian weather god

- Hattian weather god
- Major cult center: Nerik, Zippalanda
- Weapon: mace
- Animals: bull
- Symbol: lightning

Equivalents
- Hittite: Tarḫunna
- Luwian: Tarḫunz
- Palaic: Ziparwa

Taru was a weather god worshiped in ancient Anatolia by Hattians. He was associated with the bull, and could be depicted in the form of this animal. It is presumed that the names of the Hittite and Luwian weather gods, Tarḫunna and Tarḫunz, while etymologically Indo-European, were meant to resemble Taru's as a result of Hattian cultural influence on other cultures of the region.

== Name and character ==
Taru was the Hattian weather god. The term "Hattian" refers to the native inhabitants of the northern part of ancient Anatolia. As a weather god, he was believed to control phenomena such as thunder and lightning; additionally he was responsible for the well-being of people and animals, and for the growth of plants. A hymn dedicated to him, awan kaitgaḫillu ^{d}Taru elli lipḫaippin, most likely focuses on guaranteeing the flourishing of grain (kait).

In cuneiform Taru's name was written as ^{d}Ta-a-ru, ^{d}Da-a-ru or sporadically ^{d}Ša-a-ru . It could also be represented with the sumerograms ^{d}IŠKUR and ^{d}10, same as the names of other weather gods. It has been proposed that Taru's name might mean "bull" in Hattic. A connection between it and the Greek word taurus, and more broadly with terms referring to bulls in various Indo-European and Semitic languages, has also been proposed, but the matter remains unresolved. It is nonetheless assumed that Taru can be characterized as a bull god. He could be depicted in theriomorphic form as this animal. Bulls not accompanied by any other figures on seals from Kanesh might represent him. In addition to his symbolic animal, his attributes were a mace and lightning.

== Relations to other Anatolian weather gods ==
According to Piotr Taracha, it can be assumed that the theonym Taru referred to multiple individual weather deities worshiped in various locations. Volkert Haas identified the Weather god of Nerik, the head of the local pantheon of Nerik in Hittite times, as Taru. It has also been suggested that the names Wašezzili (likely to be identified as the Weather god of Zippalanda) and Ziparwa referred to local forms of Taru. Furthermore, the deity Tahaštaru, whose name according to Carlo Corti can be interpreted as combination of Taru and a prefix also attested in a number of other northern Anatolian theonyms (Tahašail, Tahattenuit, Tahawašezzu, Tahpillanu) was the weather god of Dahattaruna. Theophoric names invoking Taru have also been identified in texts from Kanesh, but there is no indication in known sources that Hattian culture had influence on the local pantheon. There is evidence that a weather god did belong to it, though Guido Kryszat assumes he might have been Tarḫunna or less plausibly Nipas.

=== Taru, Tarḫunna and Tarḫunz ===
It is assumed that the early Hittites "were impressed by Hattic religious culture and attempted to imitate the kind of complex society that they encountered in central Anatolia". Daniel Schwemer states that the scope of this process makes it impossible to study either the Hattian or Hititte weather god on his own, without considering the other. While the names of both Hittite (Tarḫunna) and Luwian (Tarḫunz) weather gods are derived from an Indo-European root, they are not cognate with the names of other weather gods in pantheons of speakers of languages from this group, and might have been formed specifically to resemble the name of Taru. Schwemer goes as far as suggesting both gods were effectively adaptations of Taru. Gary Beckman more cautiously calls them "a melding of the Indo-European Sky-god with the Hattic weather god Taru". Further derivatives of the Hittite and Luwian names include later deities such as Lycian Trqqas, who continued to appear as an element in theophoric names from Anatolia as late as in the Hellenistic period.

The myth of Illuyanka, whose Hittite version (CTH 321) casts Tarḫunna as the protagonist, most likely goes back to an earlier Hattian tale, which presumably had Taru confront the monster instead. Schwemer suggests that the epithet "storm god of heaven", which designated the primary manifestation of Tarḫunna in Hittite sources from the Old Hittite period onward, could be analogously applied to Taru as well.

Eventually the use of the same logograms to refer to a large number of weather gods (Anatolian Taru, Tarḫunna and Tarḫunz, Hurrian Teshub, as well as Syro-Mesopotamian Adad/Hadad) in Hittite texts resulted in interchange of traits between them, leading to the creation of what Michael B. Hundley has described as a "constellation of deities with shared traits, who nonetheless often maintain their individual identities".

== Family ==
Similarly to Hittite Tarḫunna in later tradition, Taru was presumably paired with the Sun goddess of Arinna and was regarded as the father of Telipinu, Inara and Mezulla. The goddess Zintuḫi, whose name is seemingly derived from the Hattic word zintu, "grandchild", likely was regarded as the weather god's granddaughter in Hattian culture already.

It is presumed that references to anonymous grandfather and father of the weather god in a myth about said deity going missing might reflect Taru's genealogical position in the Hattian pantheon. However, it is not possible to identify his ancestors with any specific gods known by name. In Nerik, the local weather god, possibly to be identified as Taru, was regarded as a son of Šulinkatte. While a reference to a weather god being a son of a moon god (^{d}U DUMU ^{d}30) is known from the text KUB 33.89, according to Jörg Klinger it most likely belongs to the Hurrian milieu and reflects a variant genealogy of Teshub, with Kušuḫ as his father in place of Kumarbi, and should not be treated as evidence that a similar connection existed between Taru and the Hattian moon god Kašku.
