= Luwians =

Group of Anatolian peoples

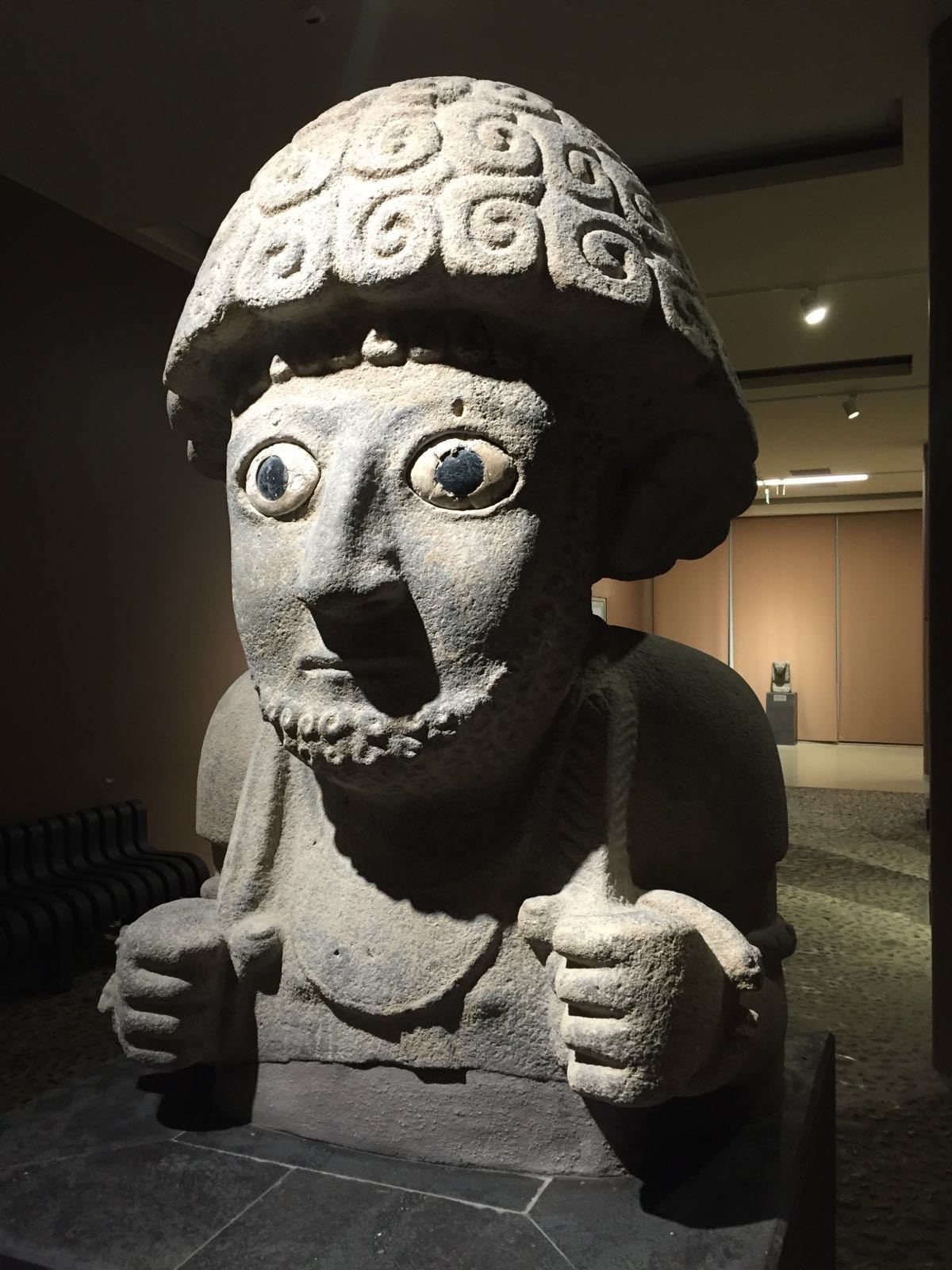
Statue from the Post-Hittite period, representing king Šuppiluliuma, ruler of the Luwian state of Pattin (Unqi)

The Luwians /ˈluːwiənz/ (also known as Luvians) were an ancient people in Anatolia who spoke the Luwian language. During the Bronze Age, Luwians formed part of the population of the Hittite Empire and adjoining states such as Kizzuwatna. During the Hittite New Kingdom, Luwian replaced Hittite as the empire's dominant language. In the early Iron Age, a number of Luwian-speaking Neo-Hittite states arose in northern Syria. The Luwians are known largely from their language, and it is unclear to what extent they formed a unified cultural or political group.

== Etymology ==
"Luwian" is an exonym first used by the Hittites as an "ethno-linguistic term referring to the area where Luwian was spoken" in Bronze Age Anatolia. It has been suggested that the name is a foreign ethnic designation (Assyrian) borrowed from another foreign ethnic designation (Hurrian) - nuwā-um. An alternate derivation is ascribed to the Luwian lūwa meaning "plain."

== Origins ==
The Luwian language is a member of the Anatolian language family, sharing a common ancestor with Hittite and Palaic. These languages are believed to have split off from one another over a period of less than a millennium. There is no consensus on Luwian origins or their entry point into Anatolia, only that Indo-European speakers were intrusive to Anatolia. Archaeological evidence suggests disruptions dating to roughly 2200 BC, which could be associated with the arrival of new populations including speakers of Anatolian languages. Within the earliest known geographical area of luwili and proximate to the location where Luwian names appear in Assyrian records. The Konya plain is a plausible candidate for the initial settlement of the Luwians.

== Geography ==
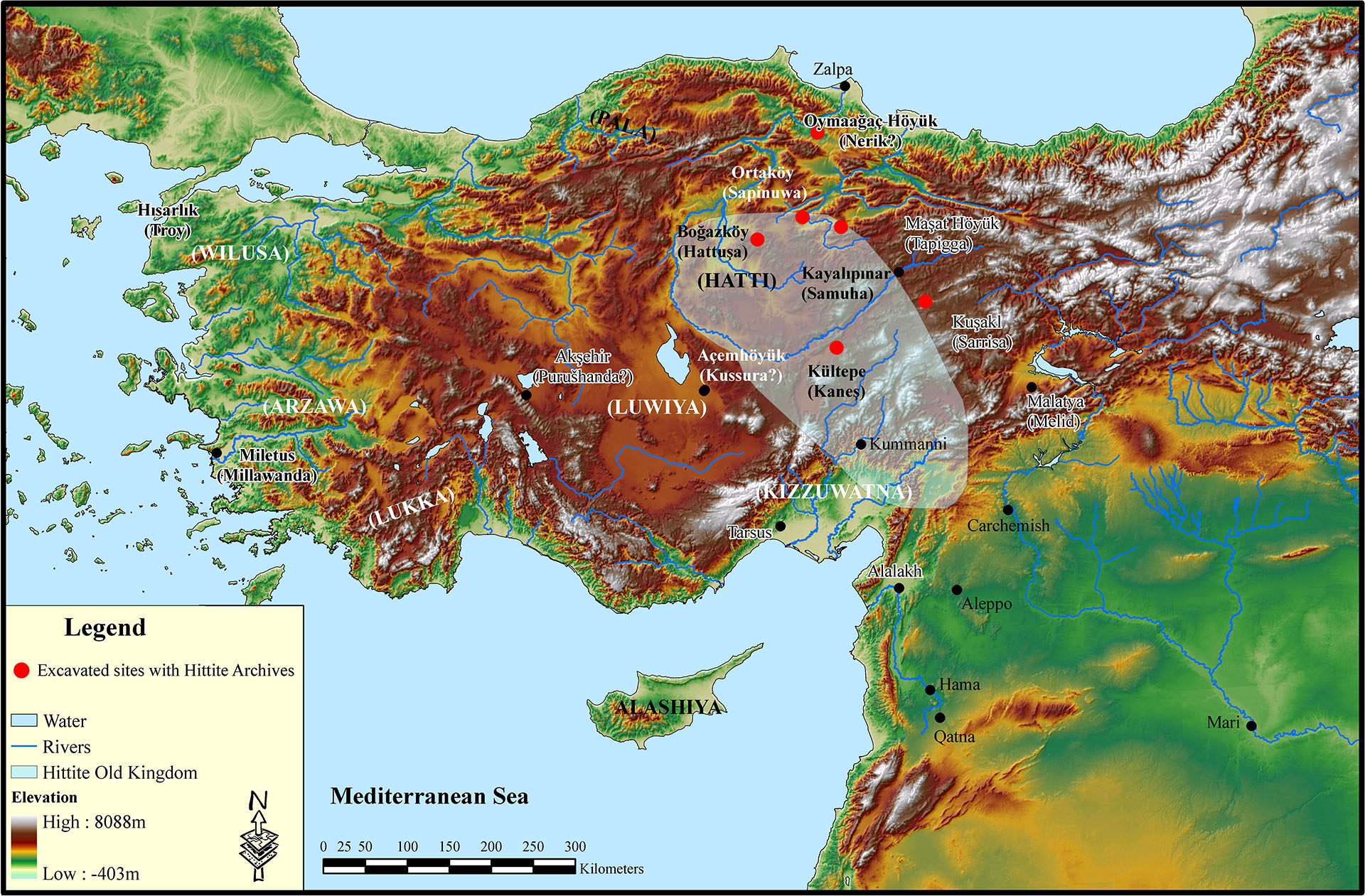
Land of Luwiya

The linguist Ilya Yakubovich has given the most succinct quote concerning the Luwians, stating:

The Hittite laws contain a handful of references to the country named Luviya, which is not accompanied by the geographic identification of this region, while a number of other texts introduce passages that were expected to be uttered luwili (in the Luvian language), even though not all of them are actually recorded in Luvian. This is all the historical information that is available about Luviya and the Luvians.

Nevertheless, archaeology suggests the arrival of Luwians at Acemhöyük sometime after 2157 BC and westward expansion thereafter. They are believed to have settled south-central Anatolia, the southern end of the Sakarya River valley, modern İzmir and most if not all of southwestern Anatolia. Fred Woudhuizen has argued that Luwian-speakers populated the Greek mainland and the Aegean Islands prior to the arrival of the Mycenaeans.

== History ==
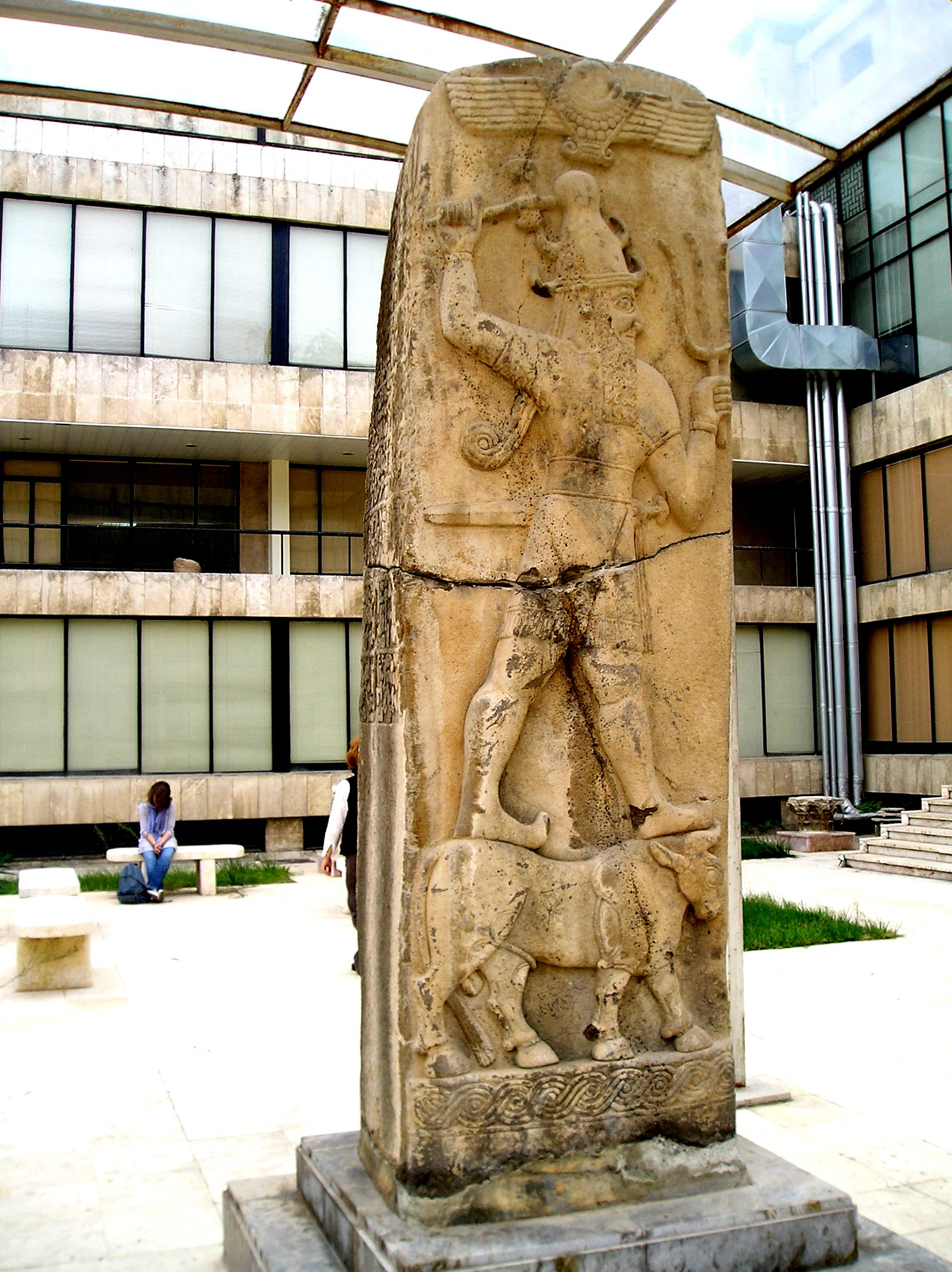
Luwian storm god Tarḫunz in the National Museum of Aleppo.

=== Land of Luwiya ===
Luwians first appear in the historical record around 2000 BCE, with the presence of personal names and loan words in Old Assyrian period documents from the Assyrian colony of Kültepe, dating from between 1950 and 1700 BCE (Middle Chronology), which shows that Luwian and Hittite were already two distinct languages at this point. The Luwians most likely lived in southern and western Anatolia, perhaps with a political centre at Purushanda. The Assyrian colonists and traders who were present in Anatolia at this time refer to the local people as nuwaʿum without any differentiation. This term seems to derive from the name of the Luwians, with the change from l/n resulting from the mediation of Hurrian.

Linguistic models suggest the existence of a common Luwian-speaking state circa 2000 BCE, stretching from the central Anatolian plateau (modern Konya) northward to the western bend of the Maraššantiya (where modern Ankara, Kırıkkale and Kırşehir provinces meet). The region was dominated by the kingdom of Purushanda, the etymology of which suggests a takeover of Hattic lands by Luwian elites and a region made up of an eclectic mix of Luwian-speaking Luwians, Hattic-speaking Luwians, Luwian-speaking Hattians and Hattic-speaking Hattians.

Archaeology at Acemhöyük has confirmed the remains of central Anatolian, Mesopotamian and north Syrian pottery - as well as traces of monumental structures - which tree ring analysis establish 2157 BCE as the final dating for wood used in construction, providing a plausible terminus a quo for the Luwian takeover of the region.

The Old Hittite laws from the 17th century BCE contain cases relating to the then independent regions of Palā and Luwiya. Traders and displaced people seem to have moved from one country to the other on the basis of agreements between Ḫattusa and Luwiya. It has been argued that the Luwians never formed a single unified Luwian state but populated a number of polities where they mixed with other population groups, though a minority opinion holds that the Luwians formed a unified socio-political group.

During the Hittite period, the kingdom of Kizzuwatna had its own dialect of Luwian, distinct from that spoken in Hattusa. Kizzuwatna was the Hittite and Luwian name for ancient Cilicia. The area was conquered by the Hittites in the 16th century BCE. Around 1500, the area broke off and became the kingdom of Kizzuwatna, whose ruler used the title of "Great King", like the Hittite ruler. The Hittite king Telipinu had to conclude a treaty with King Išputaḫšu, which was renewed by his successors. Under King Pilliya, Kizzuwatna became a vassal of the Mitanni. Around 1420, King Šunaššura of Kizzuwatna renounced the Mitannian control of Kizzuwatna and concluded an alliance with the Hittite king Tudḫaliya I. Soon after this, the area seems to have been incorporated into the Hittite empire and remained so until its collapse around 1190 BC at the hands of Assyria and Phrygia.

Western Anatolian kingdoms such as Seha, Arzawa, and Wilusa may have had at least partially Luwian-speaking populations, though current evidence leaves room for doubt, and this is a matter of controversy in contemporary scholarship.

Petra Goedegebuure of the Oriental Institute has argued that Luwian was spoken from the eastern Aegean coast to Melid and as far north as Alaca Hoyuk during the Hittite Kingdom.

=== Post-Hittite period ===
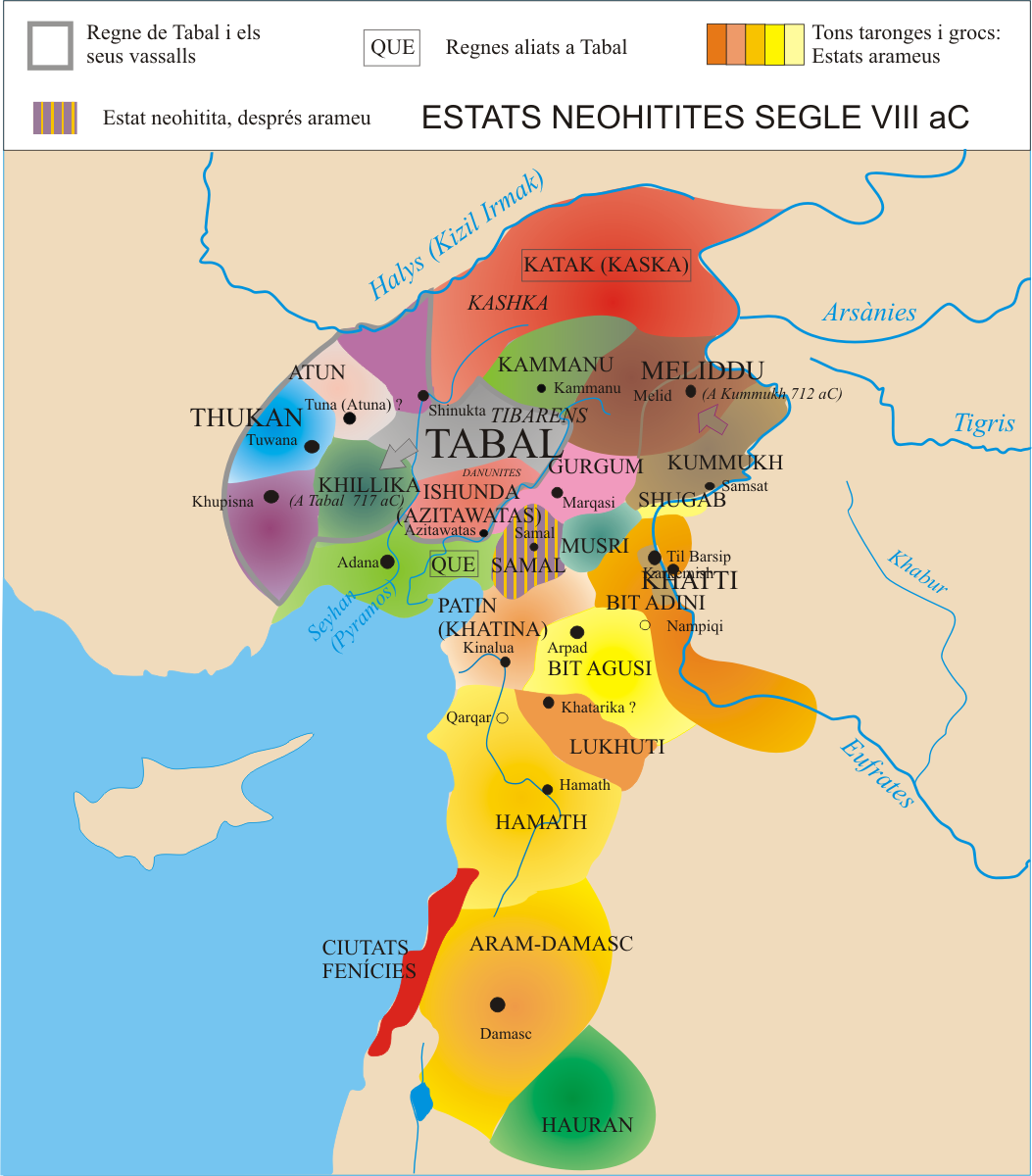
Various Luwian (Post-Hittite) and Aramean (orange shades) states in the 8th century BCE

After the collapse of the Hittite Empire c. 1180 BCE, several small principalities developed in northern Syria and southwestern Anatolia. In south-central Anatolia was Tabal which probably consisted of several small city-states, in Cilicia there was Quwê, in northern Syria was Gurgum, on the Euphrates there were Melid, Kummuh, Carchemish and (east of the river) Masuwara, while on the Orontes River there were Unqi-Pattin and Hamath. The princes and traders of these kingdoms used Hieroglyphic Luwian in inscriptions, the latest of which date to the 8th century BC. The Karatepe Bilingual inscription of prince Azatiwada is particularly important.

These states were largely destroyed and incorporated into the Neo-Assyrian Empire (911–605 BC) during the 9th century BC.

== Popular culture ==
The non-profit Luwian Studies foundation was established in 2014 to promote the study of the Luwians and their cultures.

In 2018 it was revealed that prominent British historian James Mellaart had fabricated Luwian inscriptions over the course of his career, invalidating any research based upon his work.

== See also ==
- Luwian language
- Luwian religion
- Hieroglyphic Luwian
- Luwian-Aramean states

== Sources ==
- Hartmut Blum. “Luwier in der Ilias?”, Troia – Traum und Wirklichkeit: Ein Mythos in Geschichte und Rezeption, in: Tagungsband zum Symposion im Braunschweigischen Landesmuseum am 8. und 9. Juni 2001 im Rahmen der Ausstellung “Troia: Traum und Wirklichkeit”. Braunschweig: Braunschweigisches Landesmuseum, 2003. ISBN 3-927939-57-9, pp. 40–47.
- Bryce, Trevor R. (2002). Life and Society in the Hittite World. New York: Oxford University Press. ISBN 9780199241705.
- Bryce, Trevor R. (2005) [1998]. The Kingdom of the Hittites (2nd revised ed.). New York: Oxford University Press. ISBN 9780199279081.
- Bryce, Trevor R. (2012). The World of The Neo-Hittite Kingdoms: A Political and Military History. New York: Oxford University Press. ISBN 9780191505027.
- Bryce, Trevor R. (2016). "The Land of Hiyawa (Que) Revisited". Anatolian Studies. 66: 67–79. doi:10.1017/S0066154616000053. JSTOR 24878364. S2CID 163486778.
- Billie Jean Collins, Mary R. Bachvarova, & Ian C. Rutherford, eds. Anatolian Interfaces: Hittites, Greeks and their Neighbours. London: Oxbow Books, 2008.
- Gilibert, Alessandra (2011). Syro-Hittite Monumental Art and the Archaeology of Performance: The Stone Reliefs at Carchemish and Zincirli in the Earlier First Millennium BCE. Berlin-New York: Walter de Gruyter. ISBN 9783110222258.
- Hawkins, John David (1982). "The Neo-Hittite States in Syria and Anatolia". The Cambridge Ancient History. Vol. 3. Cambridge: Cambridge University Press. pp. 372–441. ISBN 9780521224963.
- Hawkins, John David (1994). "The end of the Bronze age in Anatolia: New Light from Recent Discoveries". Anatolian Iron Ages. Vol. 3. London-Ankara: British Institute of Archeology at Ankara. pp. 91–94. ISBN 9781912090693.
- Hawkins, John David (1995a). "Karkamish and Karatepe: Neo-Hittite City-States in North Syria". Civilizations of the Ancient Near East. Vol. 2. New York: Simon & Schuster Macmillan. pp. 1295–1307. ISBN 9780684197210.
- Hawkins, John David (1995b). "Great Kings and Country Lords at Malatya and Karkamiš". Studio Historiae Ardens: Ancient Near Eastern Studies. Istanbul: Nederlands Historisch-Archaeologisch Instituut te Istanbul. pp. 75–86. ISBN 9789062580750.
- Hawkins, John David (1995c). "The Political Geography of North Syria and South-East Anatolia in the Neo-Assyrian Period". Neo-Assyrian Geography. Roma: Università di Roma. pp. 87–101.
- H. Craig Melchert, ed. The Luwians. Leiden: Brill, 2003, ISBN 90-04-13009-8.
  - also in: Die Hethiter und ihr Reich. Exhibition catalog. Stuttgart: Theiss, 2002, ISBN 3-8062-1676-2.
- Melchert, Craig (2020). "Luwian". A Companion to Ancient Near Eastern Languages. Hoboken: John Wiley & Sons. pp. 239–256. ISBN 9781119193296.
- Osborne, James F. (2014). "Settlement Planning and Urban Symbology in Syro-Anatolian Cities". Cambridge Archaeological Journal. 24 (2): 195–214. doi:10.1017/S0959774314000444. S2CID 162223877.
- Osborne, James F. (2017). "Exploring the Lower Settlements of Iron Age Capitals in Anatolia and Syria". Antiquity. 91 (355): 90–107. doi:10.15184/aqy.2016.254. S2CID 164449885.
- Osborne, James F. (2020). The Syro-Anatolian City-States: An Iron Age Culture. New York: Oxford University Press. ISBN 9780199315833.
- Simon, Zsolt (2019). "Aramaean Borders: the Hieroglyphic Luwian Evidence". Aramaean Borders: Defining Aramaean Territories in the 10th–8th Centuries B.C.E. Leiden-Boston: Brill. pp. 125–148. ISBN 9789004398535.
- Fred Woudhuizen. The Luwians of Western Anatolia: Their Neighbours and Predecessors. Oxford: Archaeopress, 2018.
- Ilya S. Yakubovich. Sociolinguistics of the Luvian Language. Leiden: Brill, 2010. ISBN 978-90-04-17791-8.
- Eberhard Zangger. The Luwian Civilisation: The Missing Link in the Aegean Bronze Age. Istanbul: Yayinlari, 2016, ISBN 978-605-9680-11-0.
