= Hattians =

Ancient people of central Anatolia

The Hattians (/ˈhætiənz/) were an ancient Bronze Age people that inhabited the land of Hatti, in central Anatolia (modern Turkey). They spoke a distinctive Hattian language, which was neither Semitic nor Indo-European. Hattians are attested by archaeological records from the Early Bronze Age and by historical references in later Hittite and other sources. Their main centre was the city of Hattush. Faced with Hittite expansion (since c. 2000 BC), Hattians were gradually absorbed (by c. 1700 BC) into the new political and social order, imposed by the Hittites, who were one of the Indo-European-speaking Anatolian peoples. The Hittites kept the country name ("land of Hatti") unchanged, which also became the main designation for the Hittite state.

== Terminology ==
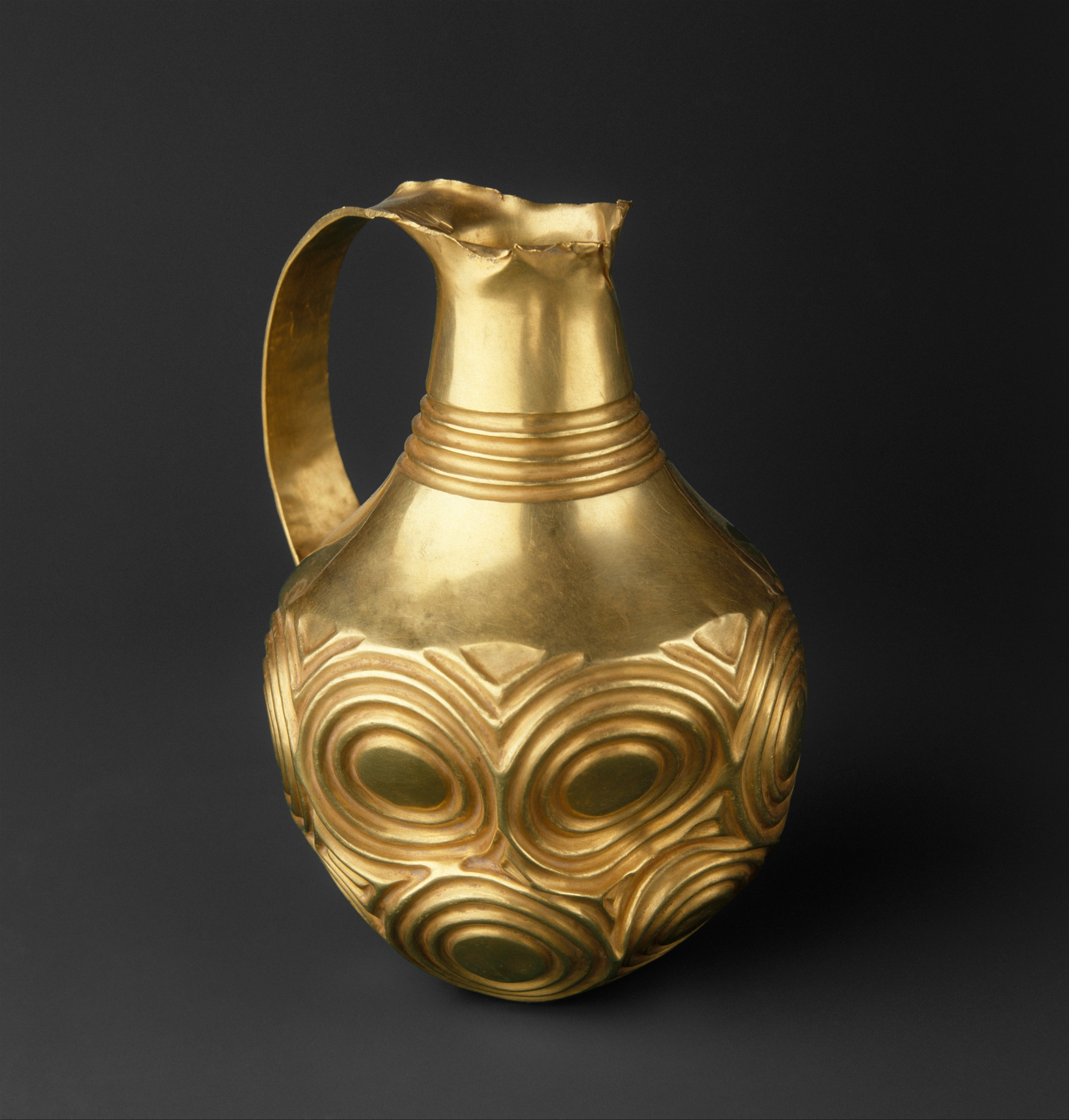
Hattian metalwork: golden ewer decorated with concentric circles

Complex questions related to etymology of native names for Hattians, their land, language and capital city (Hatti, Hattili, Hattush) are debated among scholars. Later conquerors (Hittites) did not change the name of the city (Hattush). They also adopted the regional name (Land of Hatti), and even expanded its use, transforming it into the most common designation for their entire country, that grew to be much larger than the land of ancient Hattians.

It is therefore assumed that Hattian designations had some special significance already during the pre-Hittite period, and it is also accepted, as a convention among scholars, that Hattian labels can be used as designations for the pre-Hittite population of central Anatolia, although it is not known whether ethnically related inhabitants of neighboring regions and city-states (surrounding the city-state of Hattush) ever saw themselves as Hattians.

The use of the term "Proto-Hittite" as a designation for Hattians is inaccurate. The Hittite language (self-designation: Nešili, "[in the language] of Neša") is an Indo-European language and thus linguistically distinct from the (non-Indo-European) Hattian language. The Hittites continued to use the term “Land of Hatti” for their own state. The Hattians eventually merged with people who spoke Indo-European languages of the Anatolian group, including Hittite, Luwian, and Palaic.

== History ==
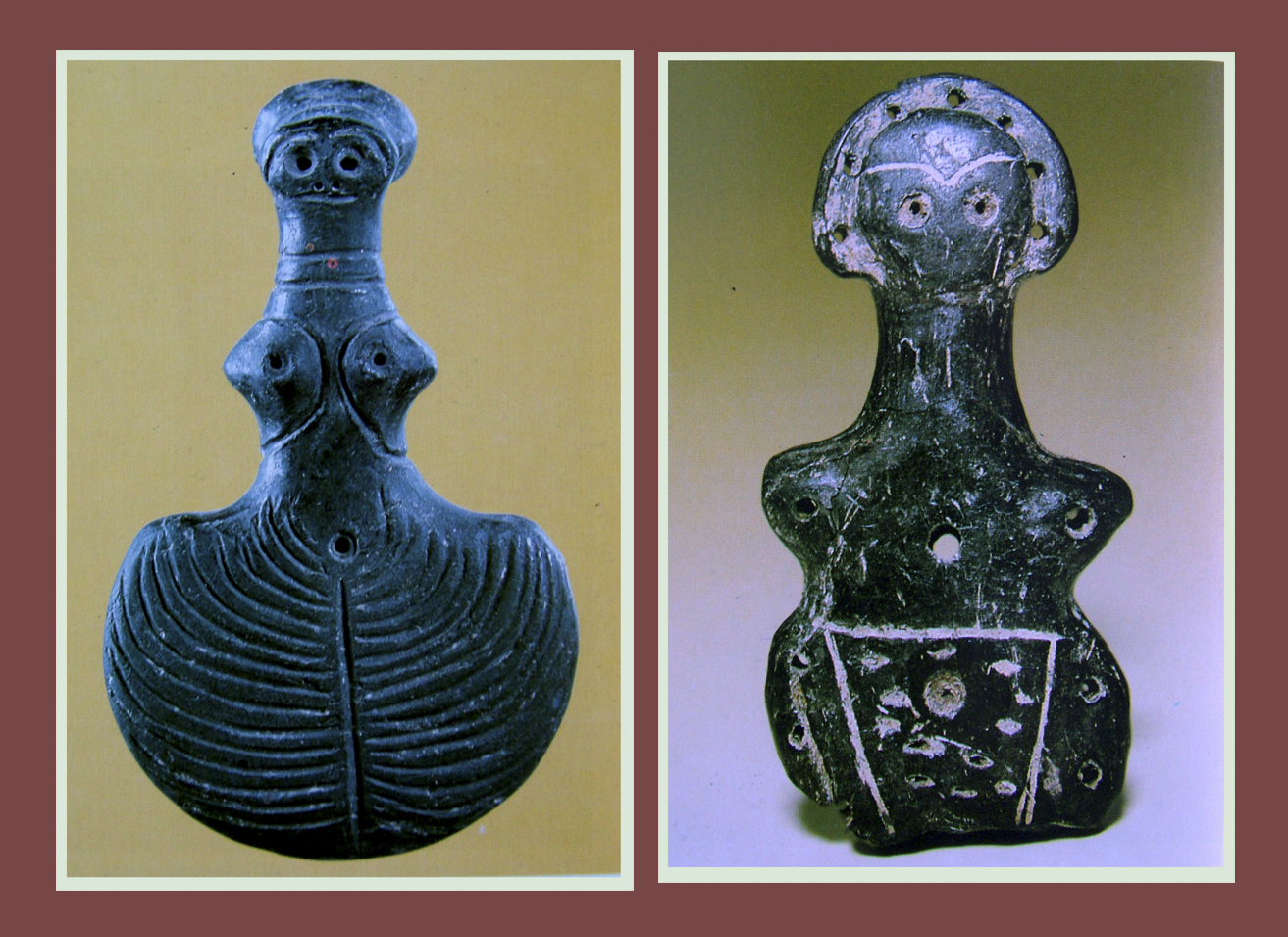
Goddess figurines (featuring stylised navels, breasts and vulvas) discovered at Alacahöyük.

Several archaeological sites in central Anatolia, dating from the Early Bronze Age (second half of the 3rd millennium BC) are attributed to ancient Hattians. The structure of archaeological finds in some sites, like Hattush, reveal the existence of a complex culture with distinct social stratification. Most scholars believe that the first Hattian states existed already during the period of the Akkadian Empire. That assumption is based on some later sources, mainly Hittite and Assyrian. The epic known as the "King of Battle" (recorded in several versions from the 14th century BC onward) narrates about a war between Sargon the Great of Akkad (24th-23rd century BC) and king Nur-Daggal of Purushanda, but those events are not attested in contemporary sources, that would date from the period of the Akkadian Empire.

A Hittite version from c. 1400 BC of an older Akkadian story also narrates some events that are related to early times, taking place during the rule of king Naram-Sin of Akkad (23rd century BC). The story describes a conflict between Naram-Sin and an alliance of 17 kings. The Hittite version of that story includes Pamba of Hatti among those kings, but that inclusion is not attested in Akkadian versions of the story, nor in contemporary sources, that would date from the period of the Akkadian Empire. Some scholars hold that the Hittite version (from c. 1400 BC) can be accepted as reliable and derived from some local sources. In that case, the narrative would contain a trustworthy tradition, thus providing a base for an assumption that the ancient Kingdom of Hatti existed already during the period of the Akkadian Empire.

The Hattians were organized in monarchical city-states. These states were ruled as theocratic kingdoms or principalities. Hattian regions of Anatolia came to be influenced by mighty Mesopotamian polities, such as those of the Akkadian Empire (24th-22nd century BC). Assur traders set up trading colonies called karum, located throughout eastern and central Anatolia. During the first centuries of the 2nd millennium BC, an Assyrian trade colony existed in the city of Hattush, and several Assyrian inscriptions mention (usually by office, not by name) the existence of local rulers (kings) of Hattush, also referring to their relations with other city-states in the region.

== Language ==
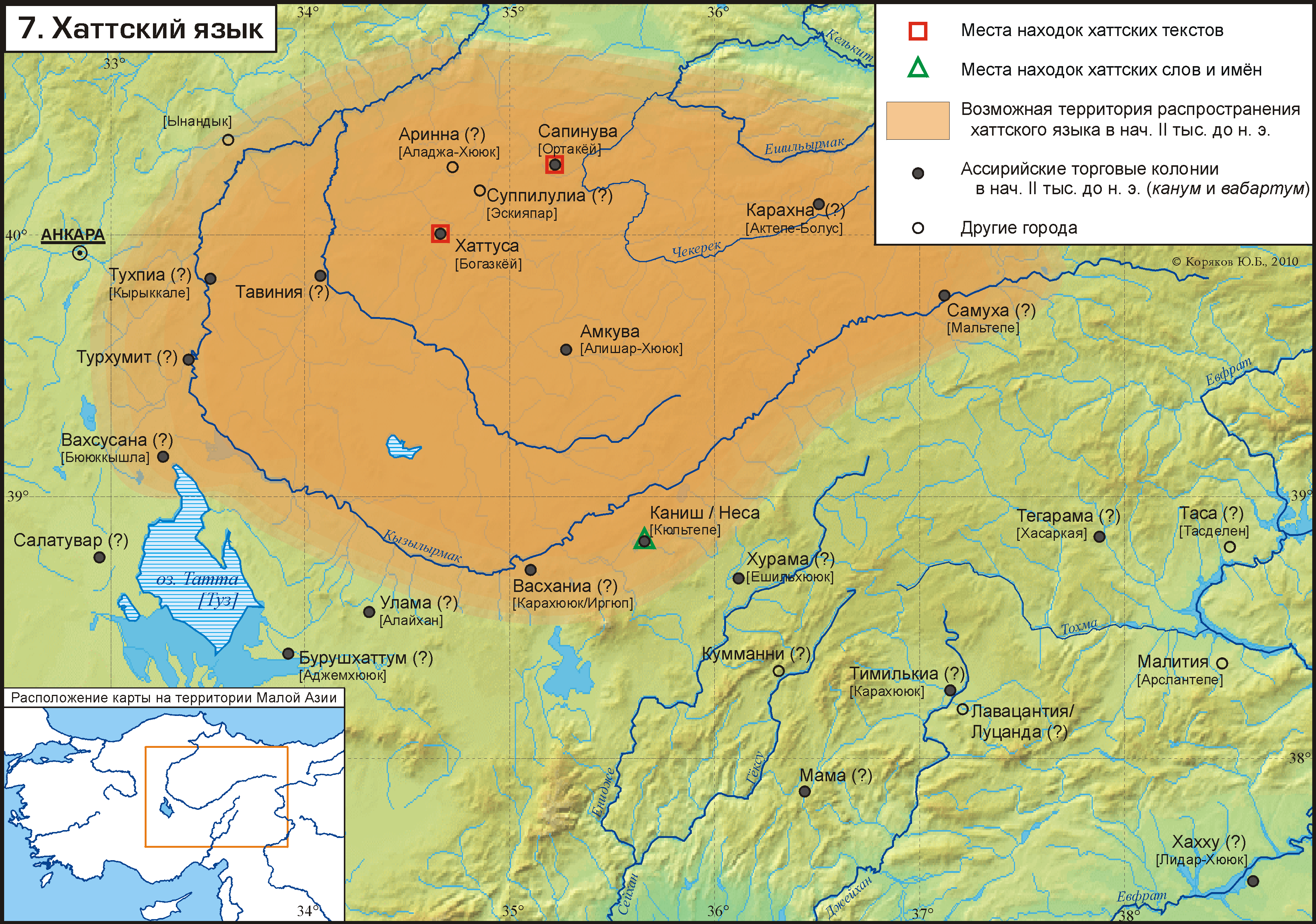
Linguistic homeland of Hattian language in central Anatolia

Hattians spoke the Hattian language, a non-Indo-European and non-Semitic language of uncertain affiliation. Hattian is now believed by some scholars to be related to the Northwest Caucasian language group. Trevor Bryce writes:

Evidence of a 'Hattic' civilization is provided by the remnants of one of the non-Indo-European languages found in the later Hittite archives. The language is identified in several of the texts in which it appears by the term hattili- '(written) in the language of Hatti.' The few texts that survive are predominantly religious or cultic in character. They provide us with the names of a number of Hattic deities, as well as Hattic personal and place-names.

About 150 short specimens of Hattian text have been found in Hittite cuneiform clay tablets. Hattian leaders perhaps used scribes who wrote in Old Assyrian. Ekrem Akurgal wrote, "the Anatolian princes used scribes knowing Assyrian for commerce with Mesopotomia as at Kanesh (Kültepe)" to conduct business with Assyria. From the 21st to the mid-18th centuries BC, Assyria established trade outposts in Hatti, such as at Hattum and Zalpa.

Scholars have long assumed that the predominant population of the region of Anatolia "in the third millennium [BC] was an indigenous pre-Indo-European group called the Hattians." Another non-Indo-European group were the Hurrians. But it is thought possible that speakers of Indo-European languages were also in central Anatolia by then. The scholar Petra Goedegebuure has proposed that before the conquest of the Hittites, an Indo-European language, probably Luwian, had already been spoken alongside the Hattian language for a long time.

Hattian became more ergative towards the New Hittite period. This development implies that Hattian remained alive until at least the end of the 14th century BC.

Alexei Kassian proposed that the Northwest Caucasian languages (also known as Abkhazo-Adyghe), which are syntactically subject–object–verb, had lexical contacts with Hattian.

== Religion ==
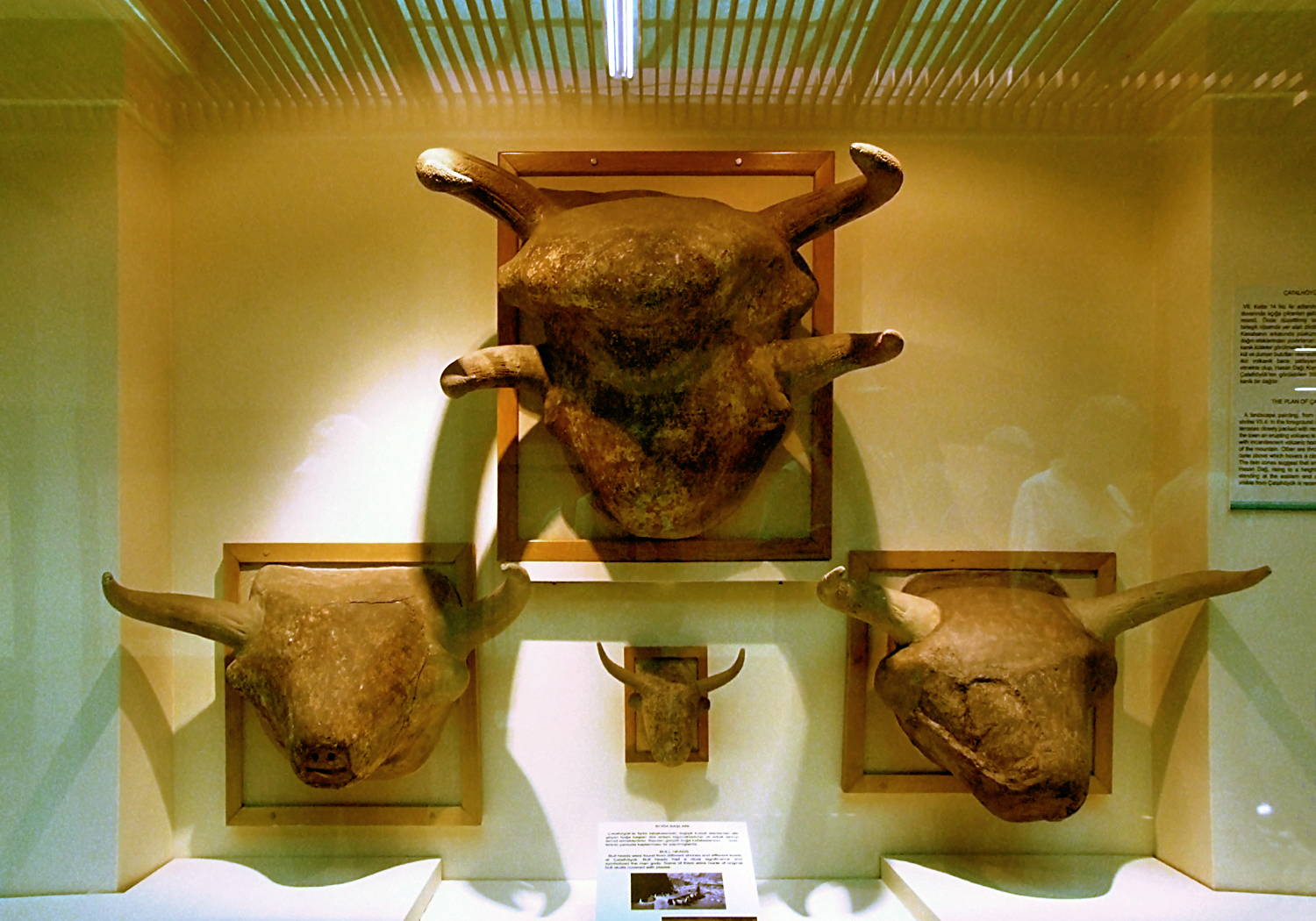
The Storm-God, represented by a bull; Museum of Anatolian Civilizations, Ankara

Hattian religion may be traced back to the Stone Age. It involved worship of the earth, personified as a mother goddess, whom the Hattians honored in order to ensure bountiful harvests and their own well-being. The Hattian pantheon of gods included the storm-god Taru (represented by a bull), the sun-goddess Furušemu or Wurunšemu (represented by a leopard), and a number of other elemental gods.

Later on, the Hittites subsumed much of the Hattian pantheon into their own religious beliefs. James Mellaart has proposed that the indigenous Anatolian religion revolved around a water-from-the-earth concept. Pictorial and written sources show that the deity of paramount importance to the inhabitants of Anatolia was the terrestrial water-god. Many gods are connected with the earth and water. In Hittite cuneiform, the terrestrial water god is generally represented with ^{d}IM. The storm gods of Anatolia were written with about one hundred catalogue variants of ^{d}U, mostly described as the Stormgod of Hatti or with a city name.

The Hittite legends of Telipinu and the serpentine dragon Illuyanka find their origin in the Hattian civilization.

== See also ==
- Hattian language

== Sources ==
- Akurgal, Ekrem (2001). The Hattian and Hittite Civilizations. Ankara: Ministry of Culture. ISBN 9789751727565.
- Barjamovic, Gojko (2011). A Historical Geography of Anatolia in the Old Assyrian Colony Period. Copenhagen: Museum Tusculanum Press. ISBN 9788763536455.
- Beckman, Gary M. (2001). "Sargon and Naram-Sin in Ḫatti: Reflections of Mesopotamian Antiquity among the Hittites" (PDF). Die Gegenwart des Altertums: Formen und Funktionen des Altertumsbezugs in den Hochkulturen der Alten Welt. Heidelberg: Forum. pp. 85–91.
- Bryce, Trevor R. (2005) [1998]. The Kingdom of the Hittites (2nd revised ed.). New York: Oxford University Press. ISBN 978-0-19-927908-1.
- Bryce, Trevor R. (2009). The Routledge Handbook of the Peoples and Places of Ancient Western Asia: The Near East from the Early Bronze Age to the fall of the Persian Empire. London-New York: Routledge. ISBN 9781134159079.
- Bryce, Trevor R. (2014). "Hittites and Anatolian Ethnic Diversity". A Companion to Ethnicity in the Ancient Mediterranean. Chichester: John Wiley & Sons. pp. 127–141. ISBN 9781444337341.
- Burney, Charles A. (2004). Historical Dictionary of the Hittites. Lanham: Scarecrow Press. ISBN 9780810865648.
- Gilan, Amir (2010). "Epic and History in Hittite Anatolia: In Search of a Local Hero". Epic and History. Chichester: John Wiley & Sons. pp. 51–65. ISBN 9781444315646.
- Gilan, Amir (2018). "In Search of a Distant Past: Forms of Historical Consciousness in Hittite Anatolia" (PDF). Anadolu. 44: 1–23.
