= 2024 French legislative election in Isère =

Following the first round of the 2024 French legislative election on 30 June 2024, runoff elections in each constituency where no candidate received a vote share greater than 50 percent were scheduled for 7 July. Candidates permitted to stand in the runoff elections needed to either come in first or second place in the first round or achieve more than 12.5 percent of the votes of the entire electorate (as opposed to 12.5 percent of the vote share due to low turnout).

== Isère ==
=== 1st constituency ===
Candidate	Party or alliance		First round		Second round	
Candidate	Party or alliance		Votes	%	Votes	%
Hugo Prevost	New Popular Front	La France Insoumise	25,207	40.19	26,438	42.35
Olivier Véran	Ensemble	Renaissance	21,089	33.62	25,120	40.24
Alexandre Lacroix	Union of the far right	The Republicans	11,504	18.34	10,865	17.41
Nathalie Béranger	The Republicans		4,379	6.98		
Rémi Adam	Far-left	Lutte Ouvrière	541	0.86		
Total			62,720	100.00	62,423	100.00
Valid votes			62,720	98.57	62,423	98.27
Invalid votes			237	0.37	274	0.43
Blank votes			675	1.06	826	1.30
Total votes			63,632	100.00	63,523	100.00
Registered voters/turnout			83,879	75.86	83,946	75.67

=== 2nd constituency ===
Candidate	Party or alliance		First round		Second round	
Candidate	Party or alliance		Votes	%	Votes	%
Cyrielle Châtelain	New Popular Front	The Ecologists	22,185	42.17	30,855	62.07
Edouard Robert	National Rally		16,043	30.50	18,854	37.93
Louve Carrière	Ensemble	Renaissance	10,114	19.23		
Raphaele de Carvalho	The Republicans		3,064	5.82		
Chantal Gomez	Far-left	Lutte Ouvrière	661	1.26		
Bruno Lafeuille	Reconquête		540	1.03		
Total			52,607	100.00	49,709	100.00
Valid votes			52,607	97.78	49,709	92.79
Invalid votes			295	0.55	729	1.36
Blank votes			898	1.67	3,136	5.85
Total votes			53,800	100.00	53,574	100.00
Registered voters/turnout			79,215	67.92	79,236	67.61

=== 3rd constituency ===
Candidate	Party or alliance		First round		Second round	
Candidate	Party or alliance		Votes	%	Votes	%
Élisa Martin	New Popular Front	La France Insoumise	16,933	42.84	24,837	69.61
Christel Dupré	National Rally		8,989	22.74	10,844	30.39
Emilie Chalas	Ensemble	Renaissance	7,908	20.01		
Stéphane Gemmani	Miscellaneous left	Socialist Party (Note: Dissident who ran without the backing of the New Popular Front)	3,059	7.74		
Coline Genevois	The Republicans		1,103	2.79		
M'Hamed Benharouga	Union of Democrats and Independents		370	0.94		
Khemisti Boubeker	Miscellaneous left	Independent	289	0.73		
Isabelle Fassion	Reconquête		251	0.63		
Catherine Brun	Far-left	Lutte Ouvrière	223	0.56		
Louiliam Clot	Ecologists	Independent	181	0.46		
Baptiste Anglade	Far-left	New Anticapitalist Party (Note: Dissident who ran without the backing of the New Popular Front)	142	0.36		
Samuel Le Fourn	Far-left	Independent Workers' Party (Note: Dissident who ran without the backing of the New Popular Front)	82	0.21		
Total			39,530	100.00	35,681	100.00
Valid votes			39,530	98.27	35,681	90.63
Invalid votes			250	0.62	792	2.01
Blank votes			446	1.11	2,898	7.36
Total votes			40,226	100.00	39,371	100.00
Registered voters/turnout			57,458	70.01	57,526	68.44

=== 4th constituency ===
Candidate	Party or alliance		First round		Second round	
Candidate	Party or alliance		Votes	%	Votes	%
Marie-Noëlle Battistel	New Popular Front	Socialist Party	27,548	42.52	37,148	59.92
Anne-Marie Malandrino	Union of the far right	The Republicans	20,812	32.12	24,849	40.08
Evelyne de Caro	Ensemble	Democratic Movement	7,751	11.96		
Alexandra Veyret	The Republicans		7,219	11.14		
David Babut	Reconquête		838	1.29		
Alain Ziegler	Far-left	Lutte Ouvrière	619	0.96		
Total			64,787	100.00	61,997	100.00
Valid votes			64,787	97.84	61,997	93.72
Invalid votes			329	0.50	799	1.21
Blank votes			1,100	1.66	3,358	5.08
Total votes			66,216	100.00	66,154	100.00
Registered voters/turnout			92,601	71.51	92,613	71.43

=== 5th constituency ===
Candidate	Party or alliance		First round		Second round	
Candidate	Party or alliance		Votes	%	Votes	%
Jérémie Iordanoff	New Popular Front	The Ecologists	27,874	36.25	43,281	59.95
Frédérique Schreiber	National Rally		23,710	30.83	28,914	40.05
Jean-Charles Colas Roy	Ensemble	Renaissance	15,895	20.67		
Dominique Escaron	Miscellaneous centre	The Republicans	7,257	9.44		
Philippe Garrigos	Sovereigntist right	Independent	789	1.03		
Christine Tulipe	Far-left	Lutte Ouvrière	749	0.97		
Béatrice Lacrouts	Reconquête		622	0.81		
Total			76,896	100.00	72,195	100.00
Valid votes			76,896	97.83	72,195	92.29
Invalid votes			405	0.52	1,029	1.32
Blank votes			1,297	1.65	5,005	6.40
Total votes			78,598	100.00	78,229	100.00
Registered voters/turnout			106,949	73.49	106,961	73.14

=== 6th constituency ===
Candidate	Party or alliance		First round		Second round	
Candidate	Party or alliance		Votes	%	Votes	%
Alexis Jolly	National Rally		29,167	47.55	34,116	62.16
Yaqine Di Spigno	New Popular Front	La France Insoumise	12,791	20.85	20,768	37.84
Cendra Motin	Ensemble	Horizons	10,712	17.46		
Annie Pourtier	The Republicans		7,816	12.74		
Denise Gomez	Far-left	Lutte Ouvrière	664	1.08		
Pierre Fabre	Far-left	New Anticapitalist Party	185	0.30		
Total			61,335	100.00	54,884	100.00
Valid votes			61,335	97.59	54,884	88.42
Invalid votes			316	0.50	1,202	1.94
Blank votes			1,201	1.91	5,988	9.65
Total votes			62,852	100.00	62,074	100.00
Registered voters/turnout			91,054	69.03	91,071	68.16

=== 7th constituency ===
Candidate	Party or alliance		First round		Second round	
Candidate	Party or alliance		Votes	%	Votes	%
Benoît Auguste	National Rally		28,531	42.10	30,623	45.67
Yannick Neuder	The Republicans		18,676	27.56	36,434	54.33
Dominique Dichard	New Popular Front	Communist Party	13,427	19.81		
Helena Chesser	Ensemble	Renaissance	6,507	9.60		
Bruno Perrodin	Far-left	Lutte Ouvrière	630	0.93		
Total			67,771	100.00	67,057	100.00
Valid votes			67,771	97.95	67,057	96.57
Invalid votes			378	0.55	560	0.81
Blank votes			1,042	1.51	1,825	2.63
Total votes			69,191	100.00	69,442	100.00
Registered voters/turnout			97,000	71.33	97,024	71.57

=== 8th constituency ===
Candidate	Party or alliance		First round		Second round	
Candidate	Party or alliance		Votes	%	Votes	%
Hanane Mansouri	Union of the far right	The Republicans	22,847	39.92	28,995	54.10
Cécile Michel	New Popular Front	The Ecologists	14,021	24.50	24,601	45.90
Caroline Abadie	Ensemble	Renaissance	11,727	20.49		
Jean-Claude Lassalle	The Republicans		7,923	13.84		
Jacques Lacaille	Far-left	Lutte Ouvrière	623	1.09		
Aurore Galves	Independent		91	0.16		
Total			57,232	100.00	53,596	100.00
Valid votes			57,232	97.68	53,596	91.39
Invalid votes			336	0.57	990	1.69
Blank votes			1,026	1.75	4,059	6.92
Total votes			58,594	100.00	58,645	100.00
Registered voters/turnout			82,842	70.73	82,869	70.77

=== 9th constituency ===
Candidate	Party or alliance		First round		Second round	
Candidate	Party or alliance		Votes	%	Votes	%
Cécile Bene	National Rally		24,106	34.04	30,079	47.38
Sandrine Nosbé	New Popular Front	La France Insoumise	19,825	27.99	33,412	52.62
Elodie Jacquier-Laforge	Ensemble	Democratic Movement	19,307	27.26		
Héloïse Baradel	The Republicans		5,468	7.72		
Gaelle Offranc Piret	Ecologists	Independent	833	1.18		
Claude Detroyat	Far-left	Lutte Ouvrière	756	1.07		
Salvador Vero	Reconquête		397	0.56		
Valentin Radlo	Independent		124	0.18		
Emma Vassal	Far-left	Independent	9	0.01		
Total			70,825	100.00	63,491	100.00
Valid votes			70,825	97.58	63,491	87.72
Invalid votes			309	0.43	1,394	1.93
Blank votes			1,447	1.99	7,494	10.35
Total votes			72,581	100.00	72,379	100.00
Registered voters/turnout			101,320	71.64	101,341	71.42

=== 10th constituency ===
Candidate	Party or alliance		First round		Second round	
Candidate	Party or alliance		Votes	%	Votes	%
Thierry Perez	National Rally		28,348	42.83	33,413	55.40
Joëlle Richol	New Popular Front	La France Insoumise	16,833	25.43	26,904	44.60
Marjolaine Meynier-Millefert	Ensemble	Renaissance	14,688	22.19		
Aurélien Lepretre	The Republicans		5,318	8.03		
Clément Bordes	Far-left	Lutte Ouvrière	999	1.51		
Total			66,186	100.00	60,317	100.00
Valid votes			66,186	97.74	60,317	89.04
Invalid votes			380	0.56	1,308	1.93
Blank votes			1,152	1.70	6,119	9.03
Total votes			67,718	100.00	67,744	100.00
Registered voters/turnout			99,395	68.13	99,416	68.14
