= Nipas =

God worshiped in Kanesh

Nipas (also spelled Nipaš or Nepaš) was a god worshiped in Kanesh. His name might have been derived from the Hittite word nepis, "heaven", and he might have been a weather god. While he was most likely one of the main deities of the city, and a temple, festival and clergy associated with him are attested, for unknown reasons he does not appear in any later sources.

== Name and character ==
Nipas' name was rendered as Ni-pá-as in cuneiform. According to Piotr Taracha, it most likely originated in a language he refers to as a "central Anatolian substrate", similar to these of other local deities of Kanesh: Ḫariḫari, Ḫigiša, Parka, Tuḫtuḫani and possibly Anna. Guido Kryszat instead connects it with the Hittite word nepis, "heaven". This explanation is also accepted by authors such as Manfred Hutter and Gojko Barjamovic. However, it has been criticized by Daniel Schwemer, who argues that as a neuter noun, this word would be an unusual theonym, and additionally points out that to accept Kryszat's view one has to assume the word preserved the initial n as in Hittite, but developed the same suffix as its Luwian cognate, which starts with a t.

Nipas might have been was a weather god, though the deity represented by the logogram ^{d}IM in texts from Kanesh is more likely to be Hittite Tarḫunna than him.

It has been proposed that seals from Kanesh showing a family of deities might depict Nipas and Anna accompanied by divine children, but this interpretation is far from certain.

== Worship ==
Since Nipas, Anna and Parka appear particularly often in known texts from Kanesh from the karum period, it is possible that they formed the core of the local pantheon. Guido Kryszat outright refers to him as the most important deity of this city next to Anna. Despite their prominence, these deities are largely absent from theophoric names.

A temple dedicated to Nipas existed in Kanesh. A festival held in his honor is also attested. It is presumed it occurred in the fourth month in the contemporary Assyrian calendar, in which the year started in October. It took place after the festival of Anna, the city goddess. The local ruler visited Nipas' temple during it. In one text, "when the ruler leaves the temple of Nipas" is the date by which a loan has to be repaid.

A priest of Nipas named Šulili is mentioned in a single document. However, the name is otherwise unattested in the entire corpus of texts from this site.

Nipas is not attested in any Hittite sources postdating the Kanesh text corpus. Later Assyrian texts similarly do not mention him in any capacity. The reasons behind his apparent loss of relevance are not known.
