= Michèle Bonneton =

French politician

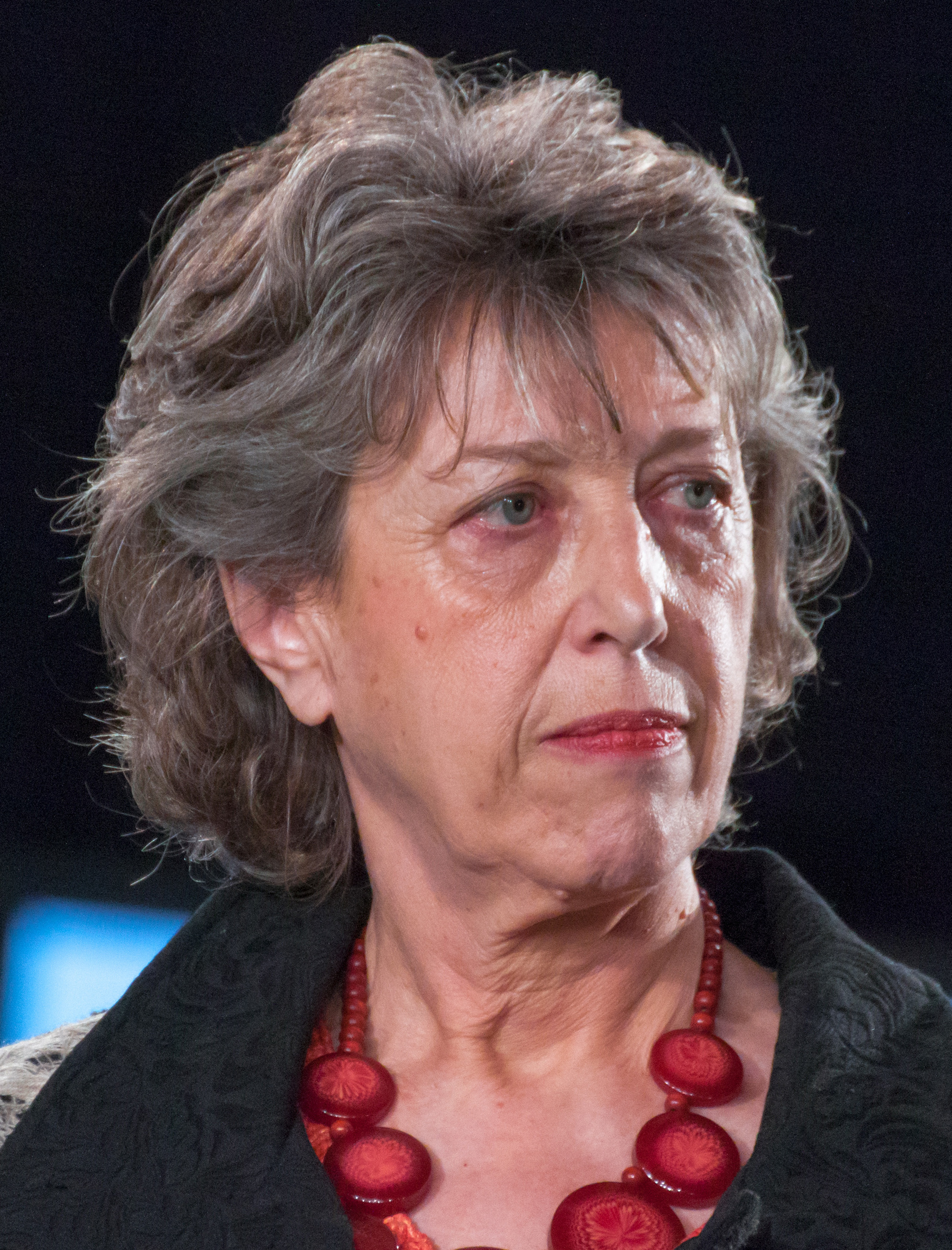
- Michèle Bonneton in April 2012

Member of the National Assembly for Isère's 9th constituency
- In office 20 June 2012 – 20 June 2017
- Preceded by: André Vallini
- Succeeded by: Élodie Jacquier-Laforge
- Parliamentary group: Ecologist Group (fr) 2012-2016, independent 2016-2017

Personal details
- Born: 15 July 1947 (age 78) Tullins, France
- Party: Europe Ecology – The Greens

Michèle Bonneton (born 15 July 1947 in Tullins) was a deputy in the 14th legislature of the French Fifth Republic for Isère's 9th constituency from 2012 to 2017 as a member of Europe Ecology and with the support of the Socialist Party.

She was an associate professor of Physical Sciences and an organic walnut grower. She was a municipal councilor for 13 years. In the 2012 election she won against the UMP candidate in the 2nd round with 53.93% of the vote (27,187 votes). She did not run in the legislative elections of 2017, but was the substitute for Patrick Cholat (EELV).
