= Yves Pillet =

French teacher and politician (1939–2024)

Deputy of the French National Assembly for Isère's 9th constituency
- In office 23 June 1988 – 1 April 1993
- Preceded by: proportional representation
- Succeeded by: Michel Hannoun

Mayor of Pont-en-Royans
- In office 1977–2014
- Succeeded by: Bernard Grindatto

Member of the General Council of Isère
- In office 1976–1994
- Preceded by: Pierre Salazard
- Succeeded by: Bernard Pérazio
- Constituency: Canton of Pont-en-Royans

Personal details
- Born: 13 May 1939 Arvillard, France
- Died: 10 March 2024 (aged 84)
- Party: PS
- Occupation: Teacher

Yves Pillet (13 May 1939 – 10 March 2024) was a French politician of the Socialist Party (PS).

== Biography ==
Born in Arvillard on 13 May 1939, Pillet worked as a history and geography teacher before his election as Mayor of Pont-en-Royans in 1977 and his election to the General Council of Isère in 1976. He was elected to the National Assembly in 1988, serving until 1993. He was president of the Communauté de communes de la Bourne à l'Isère and a member of the tourism committee. He was also first vice-president of the Pays du Sud-Grésivaudan. He was also president of the Vercors Regional Natural Park and president of the board of directors of the Musée de l'eau de Pont-en-Royans.

Yves Pillet died on 10 March 2024, at the age of 84.
