= André Vallini =

French politician

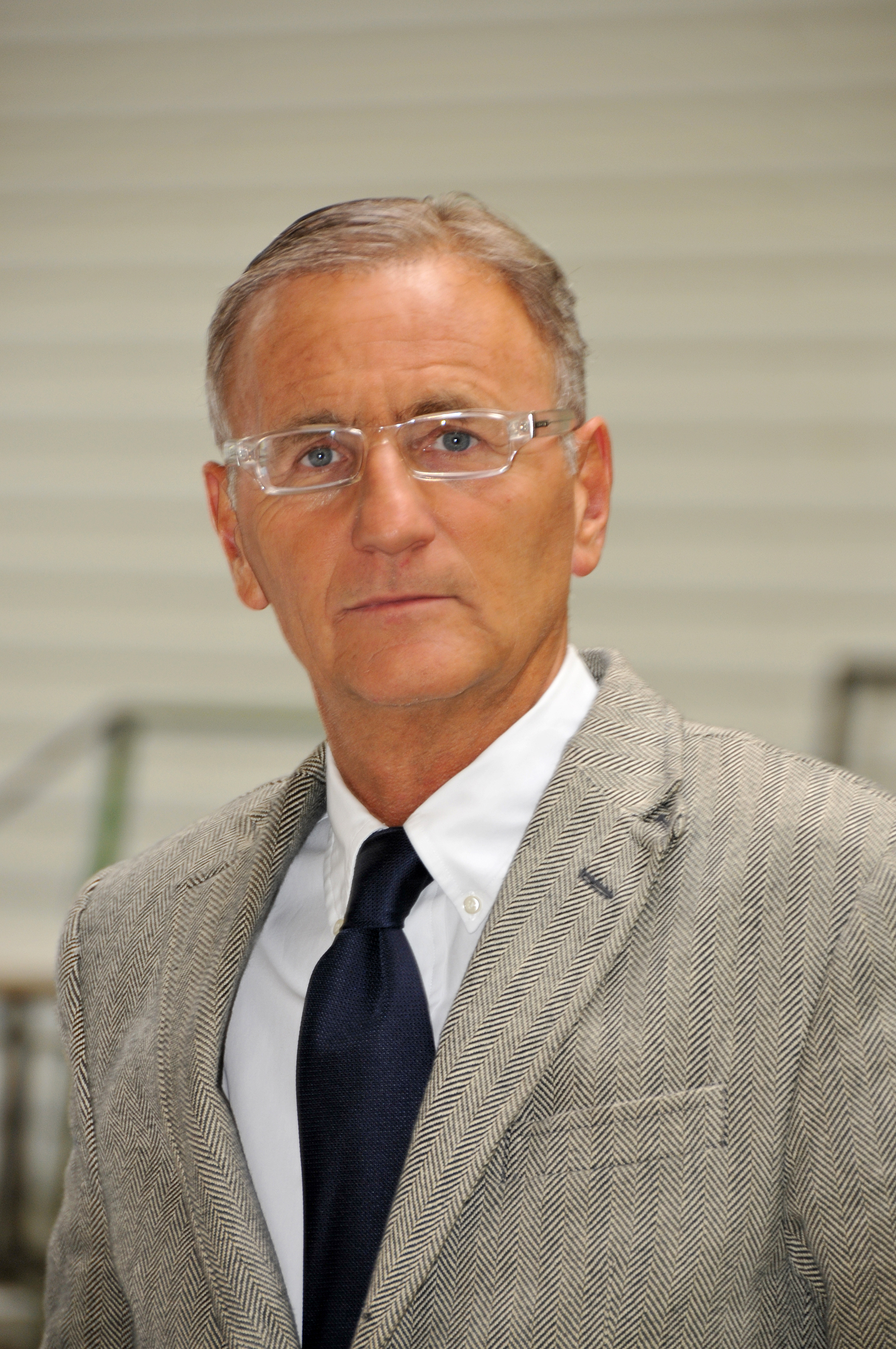
- André Vallini in 2012

Member of the French Senate for Isère
- Incumbent
- Assumed office 18 June 2017
- Preceded by: Éliane Giraud

Secretary of State for Francophonie
- In office 11 February 2016 – 6 December 2016
- President: François Hollande
- Prime Minister: Manuel Valls
- Preceded by: Annick Girardin
- Succeeded by: Jean-Marie Le Guen

Member of the National Assembly for Isère's 9th constituency
- In office 1997–2011
- Preceded by: Michel Hannoun
- Succeeded by: Michèle Bonneton

Personal details
- Born: 15 July 1956 (age 70) Tullins, France
- Party: Socialist Party
- Education: Grenoble Institute of Political Studies

André Vallini (born 15 July 1956) is a French politician of the Socialist Party (PS) who has been serving as a member of the Senate since 2017.

== Early life ==
Vallini is the grandson of Italian immigrants and the son of a small industrialist from Tullins.

== Political career ==
=== Member of the National Assembly, 1997–2011 ===
Vallini served as the deputy for Isère's 9th constituency in the National Assembly of France from 1997 to 2011.

Under the leadership of successive chairs François Hollande and Martine Aubry, Vallini served the Social Party’s national spokesperson for legal affairs from 2003 to 2012.

=== Member of the Senate, 2011–2014 ===
Vallini was the president of the general council for Isère from 2011 to 2014. He also served as member of the French Senate from 2011 to 2014.

In the Socialist Party's 2011 primaries, Vallini endorsed François Hollande as the party's candidate for the 2012 presidential election.

In 2016, Vallini briefly served as State Secretary for Francophonie in the government of Prime Minister Manuel Valls.

=== Member of the Senate, 2017–present ===
In the 2017 elections, Vallini became a member of the Senate. In the Senate, he serves on the Committee on Foreign Affairs and Defense.

In addition to his role in the Senate, Vallini has been serving as member of the French delegation to the Parliamentary Assembly of the Council of Europe since 2017. He is part of the Socialists, Democrats and Greens Group and serves on the Committee on Legal Affairs and Human Rights as well as on the Sub-Committee on the implementation of judgments of the European Court of Human Rights. He is also part of the Inter-Parliamentary Alliance on China.
