= Isère's 9th constituency =

Constituency of the National Assembly of France

9th constituency of Isère
- inline Constituency of the National Assembly of France

- Constituency in Department

- Location of Isère in France
- Deputy: Sandrine Nosbé; LFI
- Department: Isère

The 9th constituency of Isère is one of ten French legislative constituencies in the Isère département.

After the 2010 redistricting of French legislative constituencies added a tenth constituency to Isère, the 9th constituency consists of the (pre-2015 cantonal re-organisation) cantons of Pont-en-Royans, Rives, Saint-Marcellin, Tullins, Vinay, and Voiron.

== Deputies ==
Election	Member	Party
1988	Yves Pillet	PS
1993	Michel Hannoun	UPF - RPR
1997	André Vallini	PS
2002	André Vallini	PS
2007	André Vallini	PS
2012	Michèle Bonneton	EELV
2017	Élodie Jacquier-Laforge	MoDem
2022	Élodie Jacquier-Laforge	MoDem
2024	Sandrine Nosbé	LFI

== Election results ==
=== 2024 ===
Candidate	Party	Alliance	First round			Second round		
Candidate	Party	Alliance	Votes	%	+/–	Votes	%	+/–
Cécile Bene	RN		24,106	34.04	+14.79	30,079	47.38	new
Sandrine Nosbé	LFI	NFP	19,825	27.99	-2.55	33,412	52.62	+6.42
Élodie Jacquier-Laforge	MoDEM	Ensemble	19,307	27.26	-2.70	withdrew		
Héloïse Baradel	LR	UDC	5,468	7.72	-4.55			
Gaelle Offranc Piret	DIV		833	1.18	new			
Claude Detroyat	LO		756	1.07	-0.26			
Salvador Vero	REC		397	0.56	-3.02			
Valentin Radlo	DIV		124	0.18	new			
Emma Vassal	DIV		9	0.01	new			
Votes			70,825	100.00		63,491	100.00	
Valid votes			70,825	97.58	-0.50	63,491	87.72	-4.48
Blank votes			1,447	1.99	+0.44	7,494	10.35	+4.38
Null votes			309	0.43	+0.06	1,394	1.93	+0.09
Turnout			72,581	71.64	+21.00	72,379	71.42	+22.50
Abstentions			28,739	28.36	-21.00	28,962	28.58	-22.50
Registered voters			101,320			101,341		
Result			LFI GAIN FROM MoDEM					

=== 2022 ===
Legislative Election 2022: Isère's 9th constituency
Party	Candidate	Votes	%	±%
LFI (NUPÉS)	Sandrine Nosbé	15,271	30.54	+3.56
MoDem (Ensemble)	Élodie Jacquier-Laforge	14,981	29.96	-9.06
RN	Cécile Bène	9,626	19.25	+6.44
LR (UDC)	Bruno Gattaz	6,135	12.27	−4.74
REC	Sandrine Seror	1,789	3.58	N/A
Others	N/A	2,200	-	−
Turnout		50,002	50.64	+1.13
2nd round result
MoDem (Ensemble)	Élodie Jacquier-Laforge	24,427	53.80	-6.45
LFI (NUPÉS)	Sandrine Nosbé	20,973	46.20	N/A
Turnout		45,400	48.92	+8.36
MoDem hold				

=== 2017 ===
Candidate	Label	First round		Second round	
Candidate	Label	Votes	%	Votes	%
Élodie Jacquier-Laforge	MoDem	18,427	39.02	20,544	60.25
Bruno Gattaz	LR	8,034	17.01	13,554	39.75
Patrick Cholat	ECO	6,490	13.74		
Marie-Pierre Micoud	FI	6,253	13.24		
Bruno Desies	FN	6,048	12.81		
Mickaël Julian	DLF	937	1.98		
Claude Detroyat	EXG	455	0.96		
Julien Jousset	DIV	348	0.74		
Thibault Barge	EXD	234	0.50		
Votes		47,226	100.00	34,098	100.00
Valid votes		47,226	98.16	34,098	86.50
Blank votes		695	1.44	4,263	10.81
Null votes		192	0.40	1,059	2.69
Turnout		48,113	49.51	39,420	40.56
Abstentions		49,071	50.49	57,758	59.44
Registered voters		97,184		97,178	
Source: Ministry of the Interior

=== 2012 ===
2012 legislative election in Isere's 9th constituency
Candidate	Party	First round		Second round	
Candidate	Party	Votes	%	Votes	%
Michèle Bonneton	EELV	19,770	37.20%	27,187	53.93%
Julien Polat	UMP	14,251	26.81%	23,226	46.07%
Nadine Garcin	FN	8,741	16.45%		
Christian Toillier	FG	4,319	8.13%		
Claude Mahier	NC	2,026	3.81%		
Marie-Liane Deschizeaux	MoDem	986	1.86%		
Anne Gerin	PR	688	1.29%		
Huguette Grindler	??	642	1.21%		
Emmanuel Rodary	PFE	511	0.96%		
Alice Pelletier	NPA	320	0.60%		
Claude Detroyat	LO	307	0.58%		
André Rodrigues	DLR	305	0.57%		
Philippe Noviant	Cap 21	282	0.53%		
Valid votes		53,148	98.20%	50,413	96.51%
Spoilt and null votes		975	1.80%	1,824	3.49%
Votes cast / turnout		54,123	57.94%	52,237	55.92%
Abstentions		39,291	42.06%	41,179	44.08%
Registered voters		93,414	100.00%	93,416	100.00%

=== 2007 ===
Legislative Election 2007: Isère's 9th constituency
Party	Candidate	Votes	%	±%
PS	André Vallini	24,693	45.73	
UMP	Fabien de Sans Nicolas	19,996	37.03	
MoDem	Jacqueline Joannon	2,709	5.02	
LV	Danièle Falchier	1,863	3.45	
FN	Annie Delapierre	1,648	3.05	
Others	N/A	3,085		
Turnout		54,676	61.43	
2nd round result
PS	André Vallini	32,589	59.73	
UMP	Fabien de Sans Nicolas	21,969	40.27	
Turnout		55,654	62.54	
PS hold				

=== 2002 ===
Legislative Election 2002: Isère's 9th constituency
Party	Candidate	Votes	%	±%
PS	André Vallini	21,081	40.78	
UMP	Robert Pinet	13,105	25.35	
FN	Jean-Pierre Georgelin	6,004	11.62	
DVD	Eric Silvestrini	3,698	7.15	
DVD	Delphine Nadjar-Arthaud	2,344	4.53	
LV	Michele Bonneton-Caillat	1,292	2.50	
Others	N/A	4,166		
Turnout		52,697	65.51	
2nd round result
PS	André Vallini	25,924	54.06	
UMP	Robert Pinet	22,026	45.94	
Turnout		49,511	61.56	
PS hold				

=== 1997 ===
Legislative Election 1997: Isère's 9th constituency
Party	Candidate	Votes	%	±%
RPR	Michel Hannoun	14,390	30.06	
PS	André Vallini	13,180	27.54	
FN	Christian Mollier	8,111	16.95	
PCF	Robert Veyret	6,533	13.65	
LO	Jean-Claude Poissonnier	1,360	2.84	
GE	Catherine Duc	1,044	2.18	
DIV	Emmanuel Cabau	1,011	2.11	
Others	N/A	2,237		
Turnout		50,405	68.04	
2nd round result
PS	André Vallini	27,026	53.46	
RPR	Michel Hannoun	23,531	46.54	
Turnout		54,254	73.24	
PS gain from UDF				
