= Alexis Jolly =

French politician (born 1990)

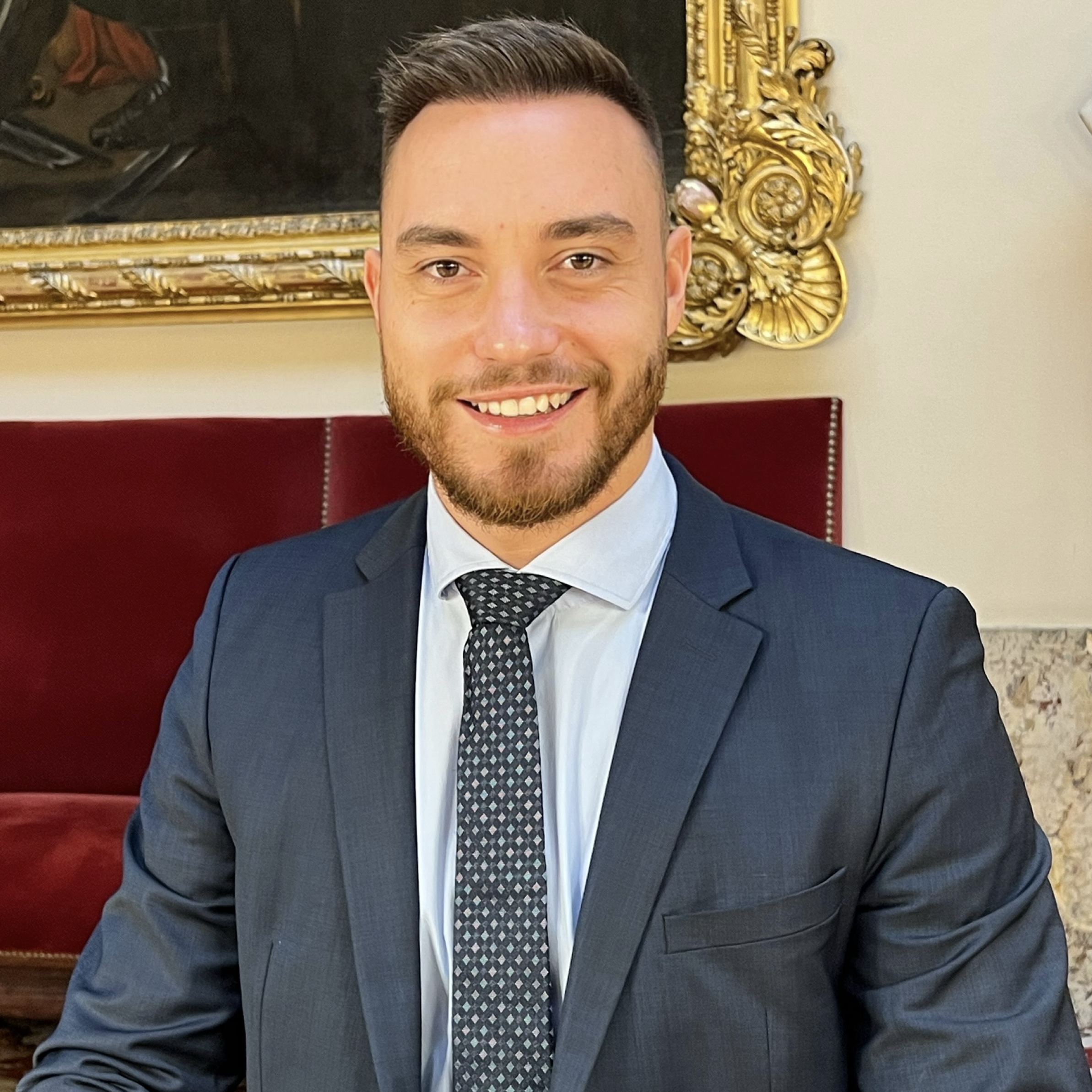

Member of the National Assembly for Isère's 6th constituency
- Incumbent
- Assumed office 22 June 2022
- Preceded by: Cendra Motin

Member of the Regional Council of Auvergne-Rhône-Alpes
- Incumbent
- Assumed office 4 January 2016

Personal details
- Born: 22 December 1990 (age 35) Besançon, France
- Party: National Rally
- Occupation: Businessman

Alexis Jolly (born 22 December 1990) is a French businessman and politician who has represented the 6th constituency of the Isère department in the National Assembly since 2022. He is a member of the National Rally (RN).

== Biography ==
Jolly was born in 1990. He is the co-founder and manager of a business selling and renting mountaineering and camping equipment. He joined the National Rally (then National Front) at age 18.

He was elected as a municipal councillor in Échirolles in 2014 and as a regional councillor in Auvergne-Rhône-Alpes in 2015. As a municipal councillor of Échirolles, he sat as a metropolitan councillor of Grenoble-Alpes Métropole from 2014 until his resignation from the municipal council in 2022. (Note: A conseiller communautaire until 2015, when he became a conseiller métropolitain as Grenoble-Alpes Métropole became a métropole from a communauté d'agglomération.)

Ahead of the 2022 legislative election, Jolly, the party leader in Isère, was selected by the National Rally to contest its 6th constituency. His campaign messages included cutting VAT tax on energy bills and restoring purchasing power for French citizens. He was elected to the constituency, defeating outgoing La République En Marche! representative Cendra Motin. He became the first Member of Parliament elected for the National Rally in Isère since Bruno Mégret in 1986. In Parliament, Jolly sits on the Foreign Affairs Committee.
