= Isère's 6th constituency =

Constituency of the National Assembly of France

6th constituency of Isère
- inline Constituency of the National Assembly of France

- Constituency in Department

- Location of Isère in France
- Deputy: Alexis Jolly; RN
- Department: Isère

The 6th constituency of Isère is one of ten French legislative constituencies in the Isère département.

After the 2010 redistricting of French legislative constituencies added a tenth constituency to Isère, the 6th constituency consisted of the (pre-2015 cantonal re-organisation) cantons of Bourgoin-Jallieu-Nord, Crémieu, Morestel and Pont-de-Chéruy.

== Deputies ==
Election	Member	Party
1988	Alain Moyne-Bressand	UDF
1993	Alain Moyne-Bressand	UPF - UDF
1997	Alain Moyne-Bressand	UDF - PR
2002	Alain Moyne-Bressand	UMP - UDF
2007	Alain Moyne-Bressand	UMP
2012	Alain Moyne-Bressand	UMP then LR
2017	Cendra Motin	REM
2022	Alexis Jolly	RN
2024	Alexis Jolly	RN

== Election results ==
=== 2024 ===
Candidate	Party	Alliance	First round			Second round		
Candidate	Party	Alliance	Votes	%	+/–	Votes	%	+/–
Alexis Jolly	RN		29,167	47.55	+17.57	34,116	62.16	+11.24
Yaqine Di Spigno	LFI	NFP	12,791	20.85	-0.81	20,768	37.84	new
Cendra Motin	HOR	Ensemble	10,712	17.46	-8.71			
Annie Pourtier	LR	UDC	7,816	12.74	-0.70			
Denise Gomez	LO		664	1.08	-0.20			
Pierre Fabre	NPA		185	0.30	new			
Votes			61,335	100.00		54,884	100.00	
Valid votes			61,335	97.59	-0.44	54,884	88.42	-4.35
Blank votes			1,201	1.91	+0.31	5,988	9.65	+3.93
Null votes			316	0.50	+0.14	1,202	1.94	+0.42
Turnout			62,852	69.03	+22.85	62,074	68.16	+23.84
Abstentions			28,202	30.97	-22.85	28,997	31.84	-23.84
Registered voters			91,054			91,071		
Result			RN HOLD					

b

=== 2022 ===
Legislative Election 2022: Isère's 6th constituency
Party	Candidate	Votes	%	±%
RN	Alexis Jolly	12,100	29.98	+3.32
HOR (Ensemble)	Cendra Motin	10,561	26.17	-6.23
LFI (NUPÉS)	Nicole Finas-Fillon	8,740	21.66	+1.91
LR (UDC)	Annick Merle	5,424	13.44	−5.62
REC	Amélie Jullien	2,201	5.45	N/A
Others	N/A	1,329		
Turnout		40,355	46.18	−0.80
2nd round result
RN	Alexis Jolly	18,667	50.92	+5.97
HOR (Ensemble)	Cendra Motin	17,994	49.08	−5.97
Turnout		36,661	44.32	+0.34
RN gain from LREM		Swing	+5.97	

=== 2017 ===
Candidate	Label	First round		Second round	
Candidate	Label	Votes	%	Votes	%
Cendra Motin	REM	12,499	32.40	18,444	55.05
Gérard Dézempte	FN	10,260	26.60	15,062	44.95
Alain Moyne-Bressand	LR	6,966	18.06		
Michael Aydin	FI	3,837	9.95		
Alexandre Bolleau	PS	2,401	6.22		
Cécile Viallon	ECO	767	1.99		
Frédérique Penavaire	PCF	612	1.59		
Bruno Liénard	ECO	494	1.28		
Isabelle Sadeski	ECO	272	0.71		
Jean-Baptiste Weber	DIV	240	0.62		
Denise Gomez	EXG	225	0.58		
Votes		38,573	100.00	33,506	100.00
Valid votes		38,573	98.61	33,506	93.63
Blank votes		396	1.01	1,702	4.76
Null votes		149	0.38	578	1.62
Turnout		39,118	46.98	35,786	42.98
Abstentions		44,152	53.02	47,480	57.02
Registered voters		83,270		83,266	
Source: Ministry of the Interior

=== 2012 ===
2012 legislative election in Isere's 6th constituency
Candidate	Party	First round		Second round	
Candidate	Party	Votes	%	Votes	%
Alain Moyne-Bressand	UMP	15,648	36.29%	22,834	57.70%
Michèle Corbin	PS	13,088	30.36%	16,740	42.30%
Bertrand Marie	FN	9,356	21.70%		
Frédérique Penavaire	FG	2,148	4.98%		
Renaud De Langlade		903	2.09%		
Anne Deverchere	??	575	1.33%		
Isabelle Sadeski	AEI	508	1.18%		
Marie Hennard	DLR	457	1.06%		
Dominique Ponsard	LO	179	0.42%		
Florence Hirsch	NPA	163	0.38%		
Laurent Simon	SP	91	0.21%		
Valid votes		43,116	98.96%	39,574	97.25%
Spoilt and null votes		453	1.04%	1,121	2.75%
Votes cast / turnout		43,569	56.48%	40,695	52.75%
Abstentions		33,572	43.52%	36,446	47.25%
Registered voters		77,141	100.00%	77,141	100.00%

=== 2007 ===
Legislative Election 2007: Isère's 6th constituency
Party	Candidate	Votes	%	±%
UMP	Alain Moyne-Bressand	28,891	49.85	
PS	Laurence Finet-Girard	10,967	18.92	
MoDem	Armelle Leroy-Camplan	3,869	6.68	
LV	Serge Revel	3,549	6.12	
FN	Maurice Faurobert	3,475	6.00	
Far left	Sébastien Jolivet	1,423	2.46	
PCF	Frédérique Penavaire	1,397	2.41	
Others	N/A	4,386		
Turnout		58,886	55.45	
2nd round result
UMP	Alain Moyne-Bressand	32,894	59.81	
PS	Laurence Finet-Girard	22,107	40.19	
Turnout		56,417	53.13	
UMP hold				

=== 2002 ===
Legislative Election 2002: Isère's 6th constituency
Party	Candidate	Votes	%	±%
UMP	Alain Moyne-Bressand	24,037	43.04	
PS	Armand Bonnamy	15,248	27.30	
FN	Maurice Faurobert	10,065	18.02	
DVD	Lucien Vincent	1,150	2.06	
Others	N/A	5,350		
Turnout		56,959	61.50	
2nd round result
UMP	Alain Moyne-Bressand	29,034	60.93	
PS	Armand Bonnamy	18,617	39.07	
Turnout		49,472	53.42	
UMP gain from UDF				

=== 1997 ===
Legislative Election 1997: Isère's 6th constituency
Party	Candidate	Votes	%	±%
UDF	Alain Moyne-Bressand	16,292	31.40	
PS	Armand Bonnamy	12,031	23.19	
FN	Christian Vellieux	11,821	22.78	
PCF	François Ginet	3,982	7.67	
DVD	Bruno Gindre	1,738	3.35	
LV	Lucien Tarchi	1,351	2.60	
MRC	Chantal Marion	1,075	2.07	
Others	N/A	3,601		
Turnout		54,619	65.27	
2nd round result
UDF	Alain Moyne-Bressand	25,060	43.46	
PS	Armand Bonnamy	22,587	39.17	
FN	Christian Vellieux	10,020	17.38	
Turnout		59,608	71.23	
UDF hold				
