= Gojko Barjamovic =

Assyriologist

Gojko Johansen Barjamovic is Senior Lecturer in Assyriology and Senior Research Scholar at Yale University. He received his training at the University of Copenhagen in Denmark and taught at Harvard University 2013-2024.

He is a specialist in the political and social history of Assyria in the 2nd and 1st millennia BC, and particularly trade and the development of early markets. He has also worked on absolute dating and the chronology of the Ancient Near East. He was a member of the team that used statistical methods to interrogate the records of ancient merchants found at Kültepe/Kanesh near the modern Turkish city of Kayseri to locate the probable location of ancient cities. His research also focuses on the development of early markets, trans-regional interaction, early state power, and the functioning of royal courts.

He has written or edited multiple books including A Historical Geography of Anatolia in the Old Assyrian Colony Period (2011).

== Selected publications ==
- A Historical Geography of Anatolia in the Old Assyrian Colony Period (2011).
- Ups and Downs at Kanesh (2012), co-authored with T. Hertel and M.T. Larsen.
- Problems of Canonicity and Identity Formation in Ancient Egypt and Mesopotamia (2016). (Editor with Kim Ryholt).
- Integrated Tree-Ring-Radiocarbon High-Resolution Timeframe to Resolve Earlier Second Millennium BCE Mesopotamian Chronology (2016). Sturt Manning, Carol B. Griggs, Brita Lorentzen, Gojko Barjamovic, Christopher Ramsey, Bernd Kromer and Eva Maria Wild.
- Trade, Merchants, and the Lost Cities of the Bronze Age (2017). Gojko Barjamovic, Thomas Chaney, Kerem Coşar and Ali Hortaçsu.
