= Cécile Michel =

French epigrapher and archaeologist

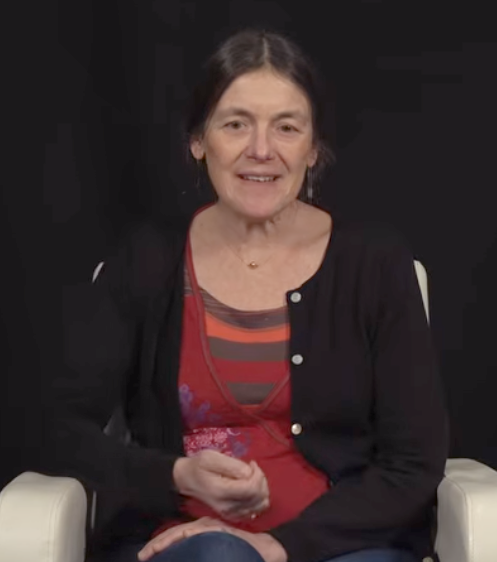
- In a 2026 interview
- Born: 20 April 1962 (age 64); Neuilly-sur-Seine, France
- Education: Pantheon-Sorbonne University
- Occupations: Epigrapher, archaeologist

Cécile Michel (born 20 April 1962) is a French epigrapher and archaeologist.

== Career ==
After Michel defended her thesis in 1988 (Les Marchands Inaya dans les tablettes cappadociennes) at the Pantheon-Sorbonne University, she joined the CNRS in 1990. She taught at the Paris 8 University and the Institut catholique de Paris. She won the Académie des Inscriptions et Belles-Lettres prize in 1999 and in 2002, the Prix Delalande-Guéreau. She supported a habilitation to direct research in 2004 at Paris VIII. Since 2007, she is Directeur de recherche au CNRS in the archaeology and sciences of antiquity laboratory. A visiting professor at the Centre for Textile Research in Copenhagen, she is a member of the Centre for the Study of Manuscript Cultures in Hamburg.

A member of the international group of Assyriologists responsible for deciphering the cuneiform tablets discovered at Kültepe (central Anatolia), she conducts research on archives, Mesopotamian trade, organization of society, women and the history of Gender. Her publications also deal with everyday life and material culture in Mesopotamia, as well as education, learning to read and write. Linking the observation of a solar eclipse with the archaeological, dendrochronological and textual data, she proposed an absolute dating for the chronology of the early second millennium BC.

In July 2014, she was elected president of the International Association for Assyriology.

== Bibliography ==
=== Books ===
- 1987 Nouvelles tablettes "cappadociennes" du Louvre, Revue d'Assyriologie 81
- 1991: Innāya dans les tablettes paléo-assyriennes, Éditions Recherche sur les Civilisations, A.D.P.F., Paris, 1991. Two volumes : I. Analyse, 290 p., II. Édition des textes
- 1997: (with P. Garelli) Tablettes paléo-assyriennes de Kültepe 1 (Kt 90/k), Istanbul
- 2001: Correspondance des marchands de Kaniš au début du IIe millénaire av. J.-C., Littératures du Proche-Orient ancien, n° 19, Éditions du Cerf
- 2001: (F. Joannès dir., assisted by C. Michel) Dictionnaire de la civilisation mésopotamienne, Collection BOUQUINS, Editions Robert Laffont
- 2003: Old Assyrian Bibliography of Cuneiform Texts, Bullae, Seals and the Results of the Excavations at Assur, Kültepe/Kanis, Acemhöyük, Alishar and Bogazköy, Old Assyrian Archives Studies 1, Publications de l'Institut historique-archéologique néerlandais de Stamboul, vol. XCVII, Leyden
- 2006: (with B. Lion, éd.) De la domestication au tabou : le cas des suidés au Proche-Orient ancien, Travaux de la Maison René-Ginouvès 1, Paris: De Boccard
- 2008: (éd.)Old Assyrian Studies in Memory of Paul Garelli, Old Assyrian Archives Studies 4, Publications de l'Institut historique-archéologique néerlandais de Stamboul, vol. CXII, Leyden
- 2008: (with B. Lion, éd.) Les écritures cunéiformes et leur déchiffrement, B. Lion et C. Michel (dir.), Travaux de la Maison René-Ginouvès 4, Paris: De Boccard
- 2009: (with B. Lion, éd.) Histoires de déchiffrements. Les écritures du Proche-Orient à l'Égée, Paris : éditions errance, coll. Les Hespérides
- 2010: (with M.-L. Nosch, éd.) Textile Terminologies in the Ancient Near East and Mediterranean from the Third to the First millennia BC, Ancient Textiles Series 8, Oxford: Oxbow Books
- 2013: (with C. Baroin, dir.) Richesse et sociétés, Colloques de la Maison René-Ginouvès 9, Paris : De Boccard
- 2014: (with C. Breniquet, éd.) Wool Economy in the Ancient Near East and the Aegean: from the Beginnings of Sheep Husbandry to Institutional Textile Industry, Ancient Textiles 17, Oxbow Books, Oxford
- 2014: (with P. Bordreuil, F. Briquel-Chatonnet, dir.)Les débuts de l'histoire. Civilisations et cultures du Proche-Orient ancien, Paris : Éditions Khéops
- 2015: (with T. Tessier) Le Tour du monde des écritures, Paris, Rue des Enfants

=== Articles (selection) ===
- 2011: The Kārum Period on the Plateau, in S. R. Steadman et G. McMahon (éd.), Handbook of Ancient Anatolian (10,000 – 323 B.C.E.), Oxford : Oxford University Press, p. 313-336
- 2011: The Private Archives from Kaniš Belonging to Anatolians, in M. Balza (ed.), Archival, Scribal, and Administrative Spaces among the Hittites, Altorientalische Forschungen 38, p. 94-115.
- 2011: Une liste paléographique de signes cunéiformes. Quand les scribes assyriens s'intéressaient aux écritures anciennes..., in F. Wateau (éd.), avec la collaboration de C. Perlès et Ph. Soulier, Profils d'objets, Approches d'anthropologues et d'archéologues, Colloques de la Maison René-Ginouvès 7, Paris, p. 245-257.
- 2012: L'alimentation au Proche-Orient ancien : les sources et leur exploitation », in B. Lion (éd.), L'histoire de l'alimentation dans l'Antiquité : Bilan historiographique, Dialogues d'Histoire Ancienne Supplément 7, Besançon, p. 17-45.
- 2013: Economic and Social Aspects of the Old Assyrian Loan Contract. In F. D'Agostino (éd.), L'economia dell'antica Mesopotamia (III-I millennio a.C.) Per un dialogo interdisciplinare, La Sapienza Orientale 9 (ISSN 2039-8557), p. 41-56
- 2013: Old Assyrian Kaniš (Akkadian Texts – Women in Letters), chapter 9a, in M. W. Chavalas (ed.), Women in the Ancient Near East, London & New York: Routledge, p. 205-212
- 2014: La comptabilité des marchands assyriens de Kaniš (XIX), Comptabilités 6,
- 2014: Central Anatolia in the 19th and 18th Centuries B. C., dans E. Cancik-Kirschbaum, N. Brisch et J. Eidem (éd.), Constituent, Confederate, and Conquered Space. The Emergence of the Mittani State, TOPOI. Berlin Studies of the Ancient World 17, p. 111-136
- 2014: Considerations on the Assyrian settlement at Kaneš », in L. Atici, F. Kulakoğlu, G. Barjamovic et A. Fairbairn (éd.), JCS suppl. 4, p. 69-84
- 2014: Se restaurer en voyage en haute Mésopotamie et Anatolie au début du IIe millénaire avant J.-C., in L. Milano (éd.), Paleonutrition and Food Practices in the Ancient Near East : Towards a Multidisciplinary Approach (HANE/M XIV), Padua : S.A.R.G.O.N, p. 309-326.
- 2014: The Assyrian Textile Trade in Anatolia (19th century BCE) : From Traded Goods to Prestigious Gifts, in K. Droß-Krüpe (éd.), Textile Trade and Distribution in Antiquity, Philippika 73, Wiesbaden, 111–122.
- 2014: Wool Trade in Upper Mesopotamia and Syria According to Old Babylonian and Old Assyrian Texts, in C. Breniquet & C. Michel (éd.) Wool Economy in the Ancient Near East and the Aegean : From the Beginnings of Sheep Husbandry to Institutional Textile Industry, Ancient Textiles Series 17, Oxford, Oxbow Books, p. 232-254.
