= Ali Hortaçsu =

Turkish economist (born 1974)

Ali Hortaçsu (born 1974) is a Turkish professor of economics at the University of Chicago. He is a member of the American Academy of Arts and Sciences and a fellow of the Econometric Society. He is a specialist in the functioning of markets. He was a member of the team that used statistical methods to interrogate the records of ancient merchants found at Kanes near the modern Turkish city of Kayseri to locate the probable location of ancient cities. He gathered micro-level data from the market and use it to estimate preference and technology parameters. This discovers rationalize human behaviors, create “efficient” benchmarks, and make the gap between current market outcomes and the efficient market outcome calculatable. His recent researches are industrial organization; auctions; search and matching models; production and financial networks; applications in finance, energy markets, and the internet .

[2]
