= Sandrine Nosbé =

French politician (born 1972)

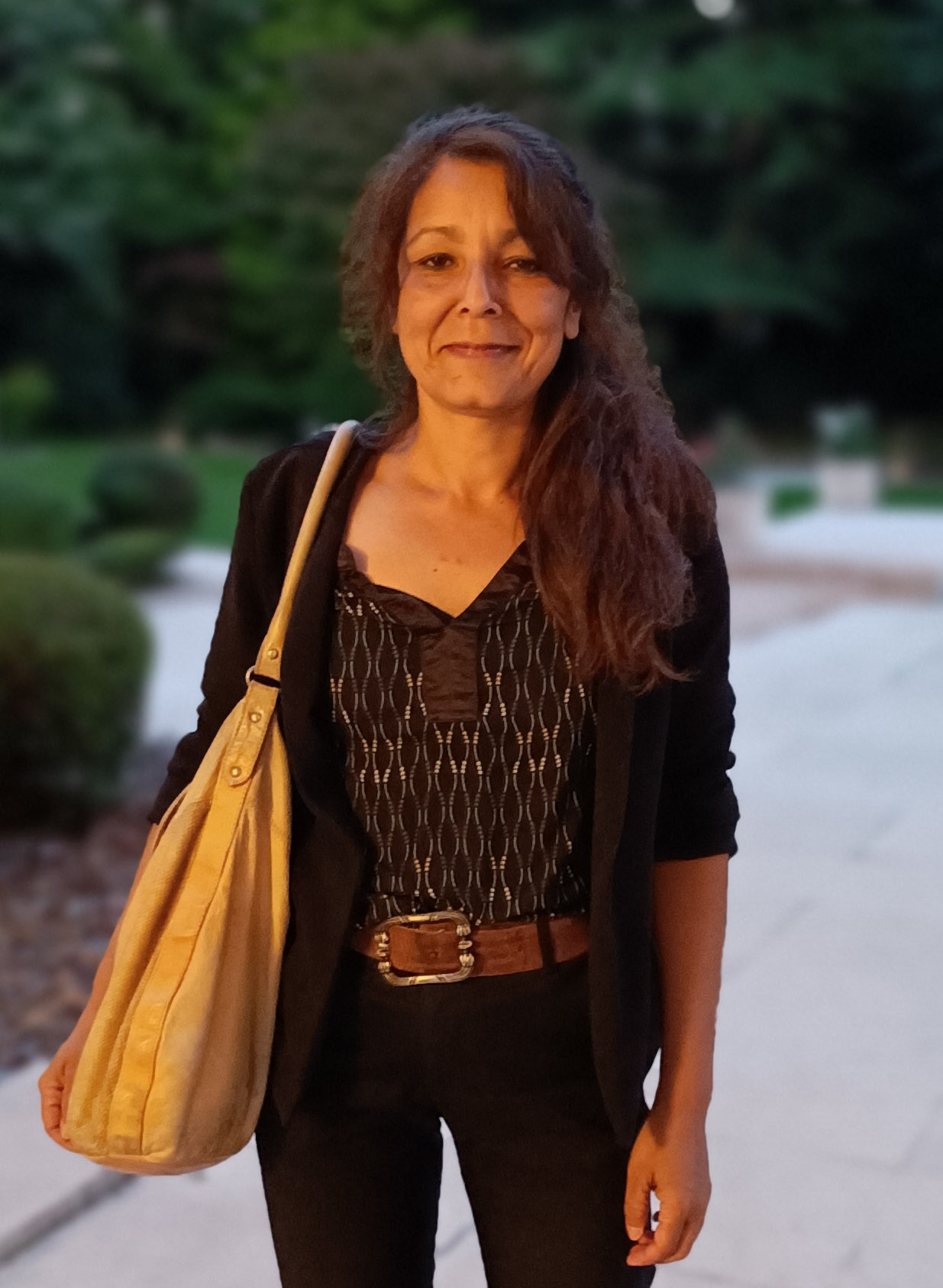
- Sandrine Nosbé in 2024

Member of the French National Assembly for Isère's 9th constituency
- Incumbent
- Assumed office 8 July 2024
- Preceded by: Élodie Jacquier-Laforge

Personal details
- Born: 29 October 1972 (age 53) La Réunion
- Party: La France Insoumise

Sandrine Nosbé (born 29 October 1972) is a French politician.

== Biography ==
Nosbé was born in 1972 in the department of Réunion. Sandrine Nosbé left the overseas department after obtaining her baccalaureate for mainland France. She was 21 when she decided to live for a while in England, then, at 24, she spent five years in Germany. In December 2021, she moved to Voiron, in Isère, and became involved in politics with La France Insoumise.

== Political career ==
She was a candidate in the 2022 French legislative election for the LFI-NUPES. She was beaten in the second round by Élodie Jacquier-Laforge (MoDem), representative of President Emmanuel Macron's coalition.

Sandrine Nosbé was elected to the National Assembly in the 2024 French legislative election under the New Popular Front label with 52.63% of the vote in the Isère's 9th constituency where she faced Cécile Bène of the National Rally (47.37% of the vote) in the second round. Her substitute was Christian Ferraris.

Sandrine Nosbé thus succeeded Élodie Jacquier-Laforge, former vice-president of the National Assembly, who withdrew, in opposition to the extreme right, after coming third in the first round, where Cécile Bène was clearly first.

== Mandates ==
- Since July 7, 2024: deputy for the 9th constituency of Isère
