= Cendra Motin =

French politician

Member of the National Assembly for Isère's 6th constituency
- Incumbent
- Assumed office 21 June 2017
- Preceded by: Alain Moyne-Bressand

Personal details
- Born: 29 January 1975 (age 51) Bagnols-sur-Cèze, France
- Party: La République En Marche!
- Education: Lumière University Lyon 2

Cendra Motin (born 29 January 1975) is a French politician of La République En Marche! (LREM) who was elected to the French National Assembly on 18 June 2017, representing the 6th constituency of the department of Isère.

== Early career ==
Motin studied computer sciences. She later worked in human resource consulting.

== Political career ==
In parliament, Motin serves as member of the Finance Committee. From 2017 until 2018, she was also one of the National Assembly's six vice-presidents, under the leadership of president François de Rugy; in this capacity, she was in charge of the application of the deputies' statute.

As part of her parliamentary activity, Motin has served as rapporteur on tax withholding (2018), pensions (2020) and on the supervision of government departments’ cooperation with external consulting firms (2022).

In September 2018, after de Rugy's appointment to the government, Motin ran for the presidency of the National Assembly. In an internal vote within the LREM parliamentary group, she came in third; the position eventually went to the group's then-chairman Richard Ferrand.

In addition to LREM, Motin joined the Horizons party in 2021.

== Controversy ==
In November 2021, news media reported that Motin had received anonymous death threats.
