= Élodie Jacquier-Laforge =

French politician (born 1978)

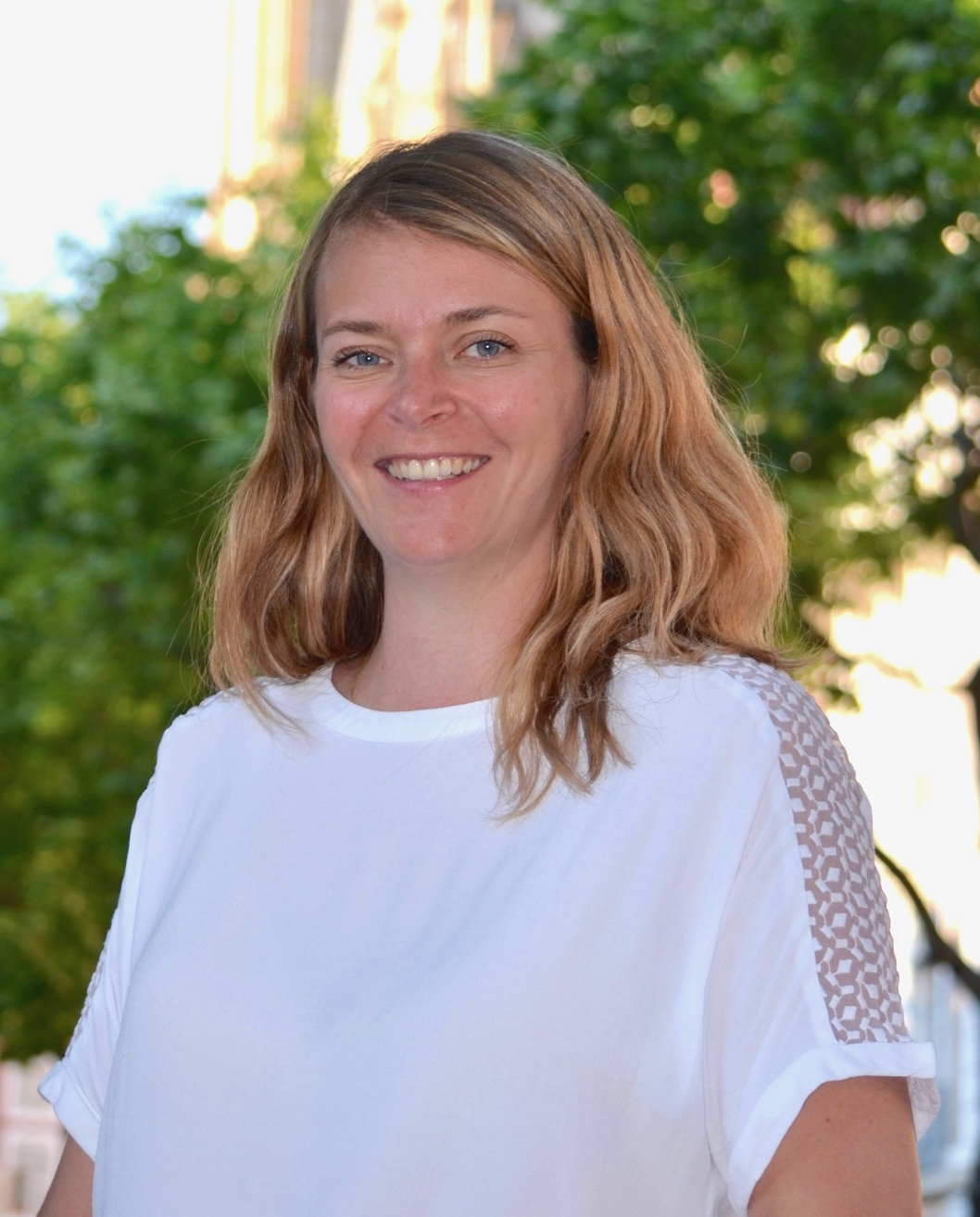

Member of the National Assembly for Isère's 9th constituency
- In office 21 June 2017 – 9 June 2024
- Preceded by: Michèle Bonneton
- Succeeded by: Sandrine Nosbé

Personal details
- Born: 15 April 1978 (age 48) Grenoble, France
- Party: MoDem
- Education: Panthéon-Assas University

Élodie Jacquier-Laforge (born 15 April 1978) is a French politician representing the Democratic Movement. She was elected to the French National Assembly on 18 June 2017, representing the department of Isère.

From 2004 until 2016, Jacquier-Laforge served as the parliamentary assistant to Jacqueline Gourault.

In parliament, Jacquier-Laforge serves as member of the Committee on Legal Affairs.

She was reelected in the 2002 elections. She has been vice-president of the National Assembly from 2022 to 2024.
