= Tullins =

- Commune
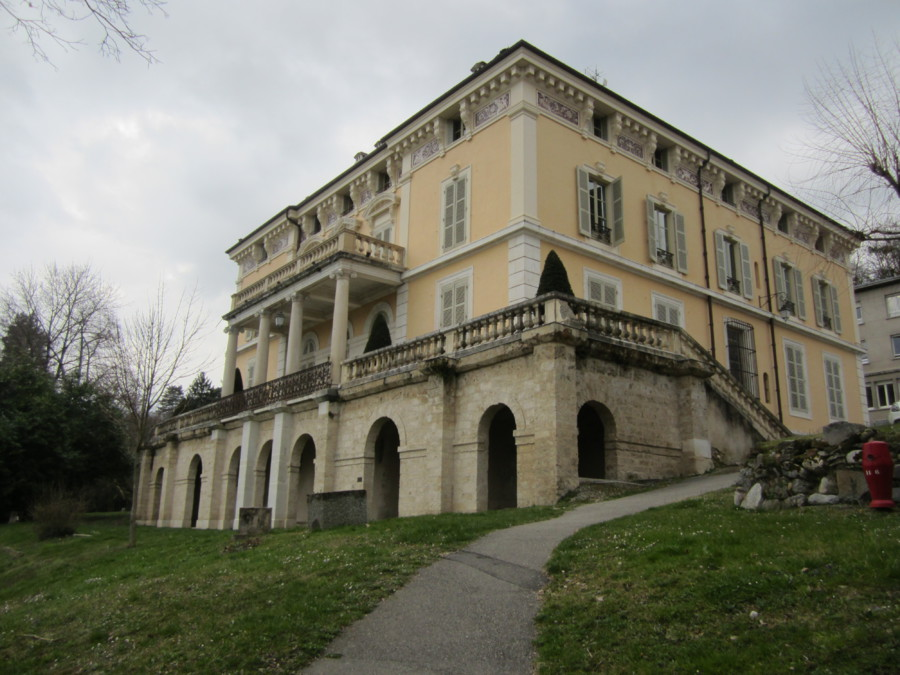
- The town hall of Tullins

- Coat of arms
- Location of Tullins
- Location within France Location within Auvergne-Rhône-Alpes
- Coordinates: 45°17′54″N 5°29′01″E
- Country: France
- Region: Auvergne-Rhône-Alpes
- Department: Isère
- Arrondissement: Grenoble
- Canton: Tullins
- Intercommunality: CA Pays Voironnais

Government
  - Mayor (2020–2026): Gérald Cantournet
- Area^{1}: 28.79 km^{2} (11.12 sq mi)
- Elevation: 210 m (690 ft)
- Highest elevation: 784 m (2,572 ft)
- Lowest elevation: 179 m (587 ft)
- Population (2023): 7,624
  - Density: 264.8/km^{2} (685.9/sq mi)
- Time zone: UTC+01:00 (CET)
  - Summer (DST): UTC+02:00 (CEST)
- INSEE/Postal code: 38517 /38210
- ^{1} French Land Register data, which excludes lakes, ponds, glaciers > 1 km^{2} (0.386 sq mi or 247 acres) and river estuaries.

Tullins (French pronunciation: [tylˈɛ̃]) is a commune in the Isère department in southeastern France.

== Geography ==
The agglomeration of Tullins is situated in forested foothills that flank Chambaran Plateau. At its foot lies the alluvial plain of the Isère, which is the agricultural and rural part of the area. The town is traversed by the Fure and bordered by the Isère.

It is located 13 kilometres (8.1 mi) from Vinay and Voiron, 17 kilometres (11 mi) from Le Grand-Lemps, 19 kilometres (12 mi) from Grenoble-Isère International Airport, 23 kilometres (14 mi) from Saint-Marcellin, 26 kilometres (16 mi) from La Côte-Saint-André, and 29 kilometres (18 mi) from Grenoble. The city is served by the Tullins-Fures train station on Grenoble line and the A49 autoroute, which can be accessed 3 kilometres (1.9 mi) from the city center.

== Population ==
Historical population

Year	Pop.	±% p.a.
1793	3,500	—
1800	3,715	+0.86%
1806	3,819	+0.46%
1821	3,765	−0.09%
1831	3,807	+0.11%
1836	4,712	+4.36%
1841	4,701	−0.05%
1846	4,920	+0.91%
1851	4,618	−1.26%
1856	4,497	−0.53%
1861	4,523	+0.12%
1866	4,991	+1.99%
1872	4,834	−0.53%
1876	4,881	+0.24%
1881	4,740	−0.58%
1886	4,590	−0.64%
1891	4,701	+0.48%
1896	4,740	+0.17%
1901	4,541	−0.85%

Year	Pop.	±% p.a.
1906	4,432	−0.48%
1911	4,578	+0.65%
1921	4,114	−1.06%
1926	4,594	+2.23%
1931	4,465	−0.57%
1936	4,403	−0.28%
1946	4,235	−0.39%
1954	4,514	+0.80%
1962	4,650	+0.37%
1968	5,319	+2.27%
1975	5,557	+0.63%
1982	6,044	+1.21%
1990	6,269	+0.46%
1999	7,068	+1.34%
2007	7,612	+0.93%
2012	7,638	+0.07%
2017	7,680	+0.11%
2023	7,624	−0.12%

Source: EHESS and INSEE (1968-2023)

== See also ==
- Communes of the Isère department
