= Alain Moyne-Bressand =

French politician

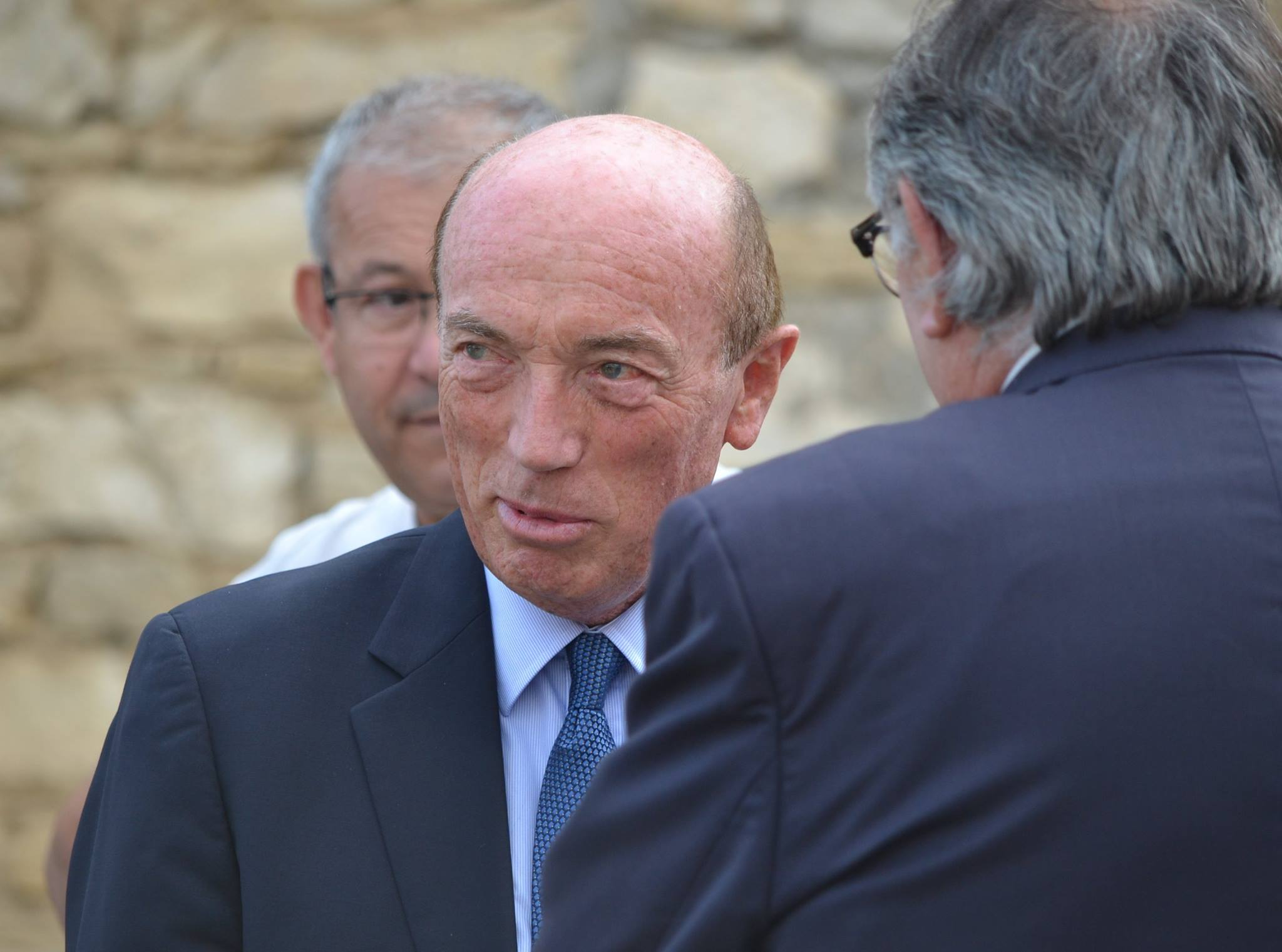
Alain Moyne-Bressand Portrait

Alain Moyne-Bressand (born 30 July 1945) was a member of the National Assembly of France from 1988 to 2017. He represented Isère's 6th constituency. He was a member of various parties through this time; UDF, Republican Party, Union for a Popular Movement and The Republicans.
