= Departmental Council of Isère =

Departmental legislature in France

Departmental Council of Isère Conseil départemental de l'Isère

Leadership
- President: Jean-Pierre Barbier, LR since 2 April 2015

Structure
- Seats: 58
- Political groups: Government (40): LR (18); DVD (14); UDI (5); MoDem (2); Agir (1); Opposition (18): LÉ (4); PS (4); PCF (3); DVG (2); LFI (2); G.s (1); MoDem (1); RE (1); www.isere.fr

The Departmental Council of Isère (French: Conseil Départemental de l'Isère) is the deliberative assembly of the Isère department in the region of Auvergne-Rhône-Alpes. It consists of 58 members (general councilors) from 29 cantons and its headquarters are in Grenoble.

The president of the general council is Jean-Pierre Barbier.

== See also ==
- Isère
- General councils of France
