= Kültepe =

Archaeological site in Turkey

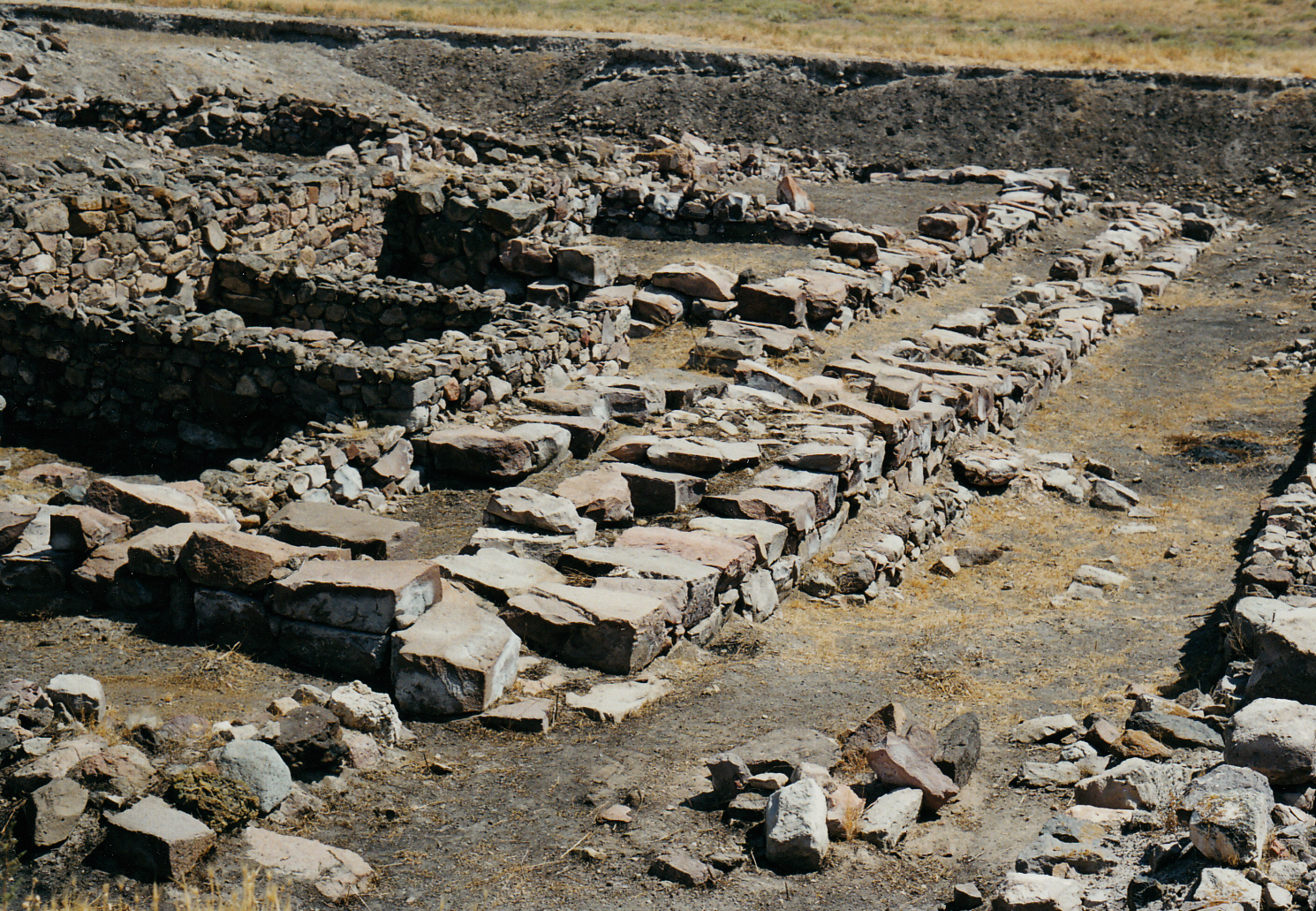
- Hittite palace at Kültepe

- Location within Turkey
- 38°51′N 35°38′E
- Type: Settlement
- Cultures: Hittite; Assyrian
- Location: Kayseri Province, Turkey
- Region: Anatolia

Site notes
- Excavation dates: 1906, 1925, 1948-2013
- Archaeologists: Hugo Grothe, Bedřich Hrozný, Tahsin Özgüç, Fikri Kulakoğlu
- Condition: In ruins

Kültepe (Turkish: lit. 'ash-hill'), ancient name Kaneš (Kanesh, also Kaniš/Kanish) or Neša (Nesha), was a Bronze Age (broadly, 3300–1200 BC) settlement and trading center on the Central Anatolian plateau in modern Turkey. It was a major settlement in the early 3rd millennium, and is particularly renowned for its regional importance in the early 2nd millennium. The archaeological site consists of a large mound (also known as höyük, tepe or tell), and a lower city, where a kārum (the Assyrian word for trading district) was established in the beginning of the 2nd millennium BC. The over 23,000 cuneiform tablets recovered from residences at Kültepe constitute the largest collection of texts found in non-administrative locales of the ancient Near East. In 2014, the archaeological site was inscribed in the Tentative list of World Heritage Sites in Turkey.

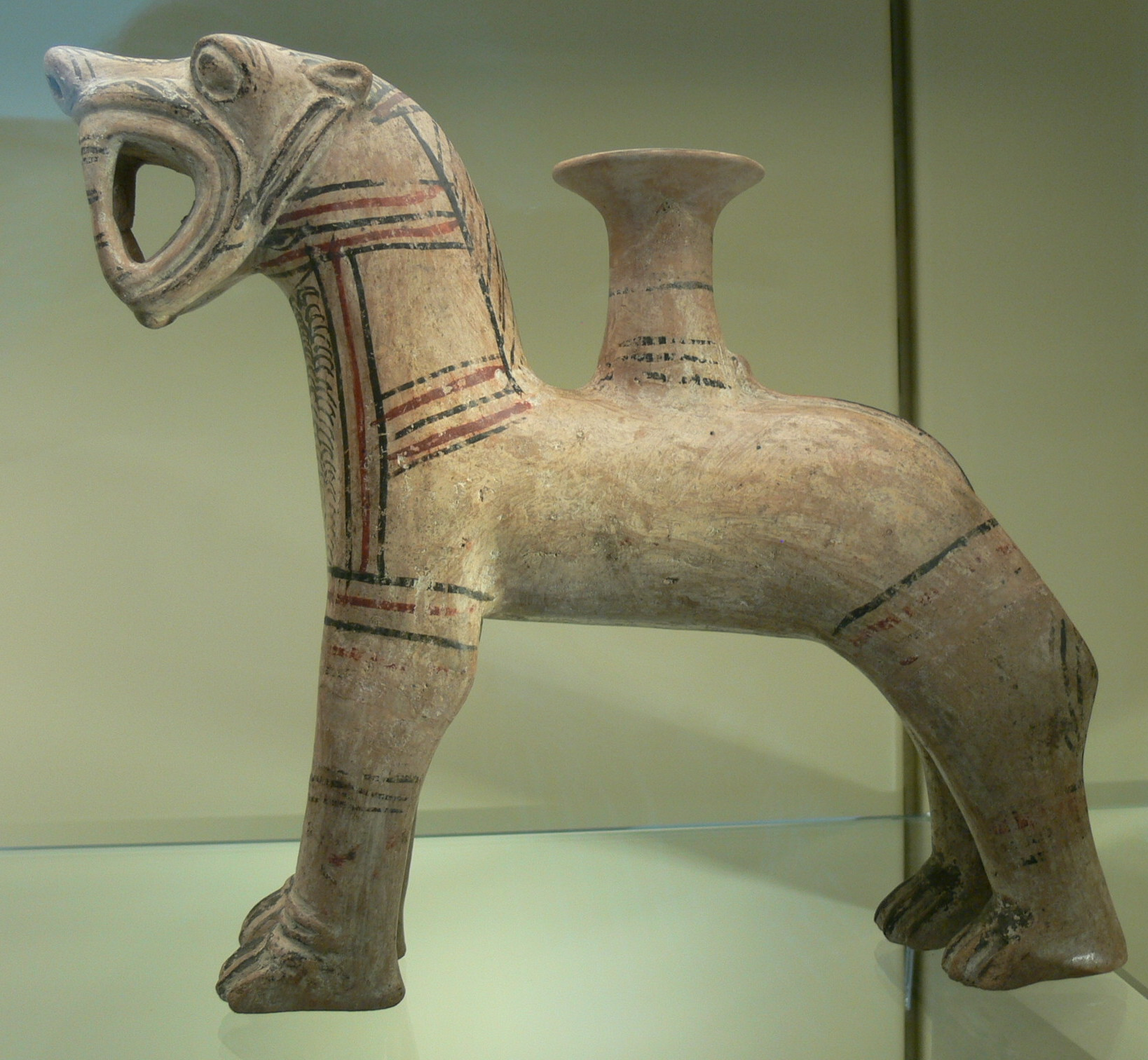
Animal shaped rhyton from Kanesh (19th century BC) Vorderasiatisches Museum Berlin

== History ==
Kültepe is located about 20 km northeast from the modern city Kayseri. Its ancient name is recorded in Assyrian and Hittite sources. In Assyrian inscriptions from the 20th and the 19th century BC, the city was mentioned as Kaneš (also transcribed as Kanesh); in later Hittite inscriptions, the city was mentioned as Neša (sometimes transcribed as Nesha, Nessa or Nesa. Neša derives from [Ka]neša).

The site is divided into two main areas: the circular mound (tepe, höyük) and the lower town to its northeast. The mound was inhabited (with discontinuity) from the Early Bronze Age through the Roman Empire, while the lower town was occupied only from the last decades of the third millennium to the early sixteenth century BCE. The lower town displays four levels of occupation, with only levels II (approximately 1945–1835 BCE) and Ib (approximately 1832–1700 BCE)—which roughly correspond to the Middle Bronze Age—yielding significant written records, totaling around 22,200 and 560 tablets, respectively. In contrast, only forty scattered tablets were found on the mound, where palaces and temples were uncovered, indicating that there are no surviving archives from the local authorities, if such archives ever existed. This kārum appears to have served as "the administrative and distribution centre of the entire Assyrian colony network in Anatolia". A late record, from circa 1400 BC, recounts the story of a king of Kaneš called Zipani, with seventeen local city-kings who rose up against Naram-Sin of Akkad, who ruled circa 2254–2218 BC.

During the kārum period, and before the conquest of Pitḫana, these local kings reigned in Kaneš:

- Ḫurmili (before 1790 BC)
- Paḫanu (a short time in 1790 BC)
- Inar (c. 1790–1775 BC), then
- Waršama (c. 1775–1750 BC)

The king of Zalpuwa, Uḫna, raided Kaneš, after which the Zalpuwans carried off the city's Šiuš idol. Pitḫana, the king of Kuššara, conquered Neša "in the night, by force", but "did not do evil to anyone in it". Neša revolted against the rule of Pitḫana's son, Anitta, but Anitta quashed the revolt and made Neša his capital. Anitta further invaded Zalpuwa, captured its king Huzziya, and recovered the Šiuš idol for Neša.

In the 17th century BC, Anitta's descendants moved their capital to Hattusa, which Anitta had cursed, thus founding the line of Hittite kings. The inhabitants thus referred to the Hittite language as Nešili 'the Neša tongue'.

== Archaeology ==
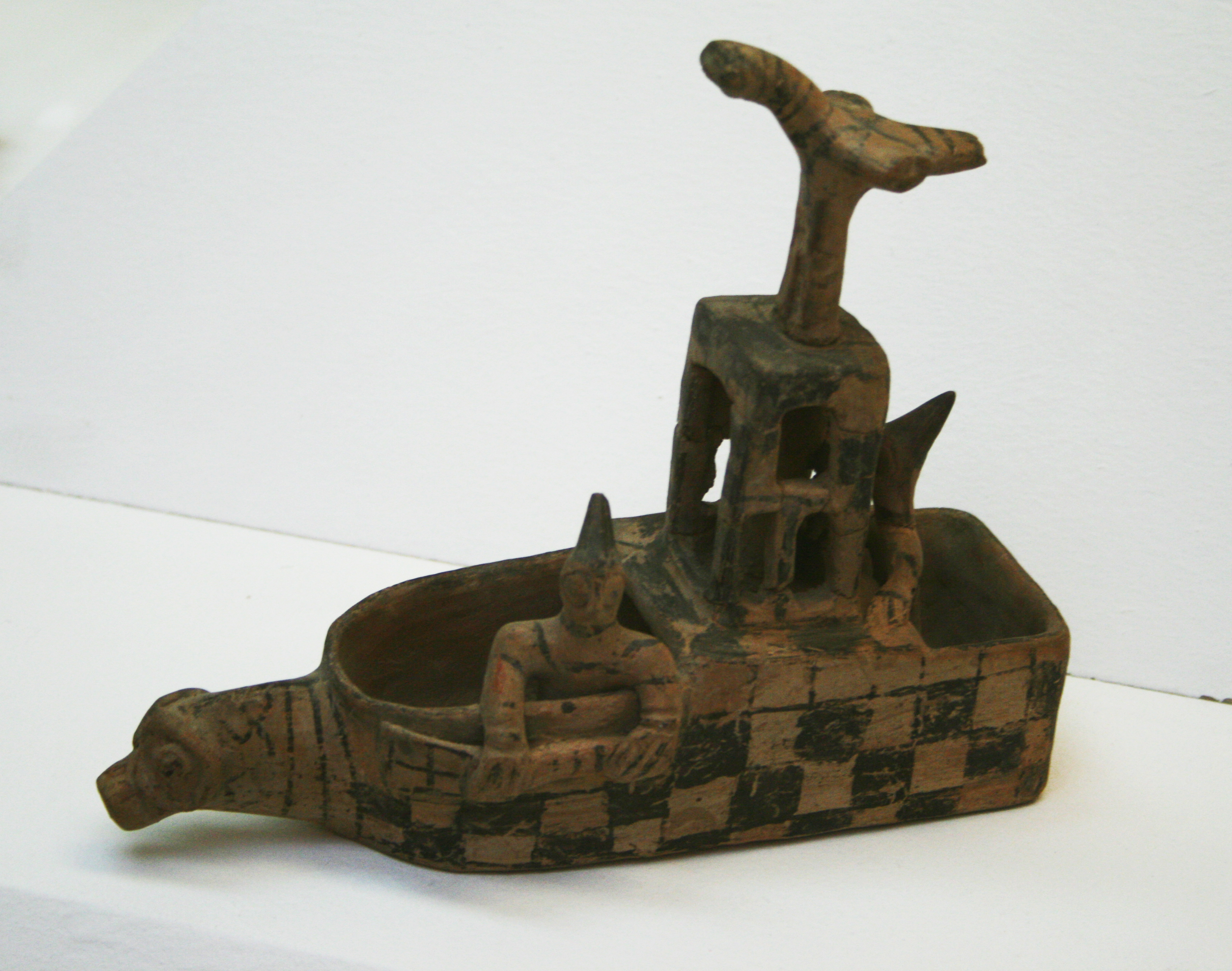
A vessel shaped rhyton from Kültepe

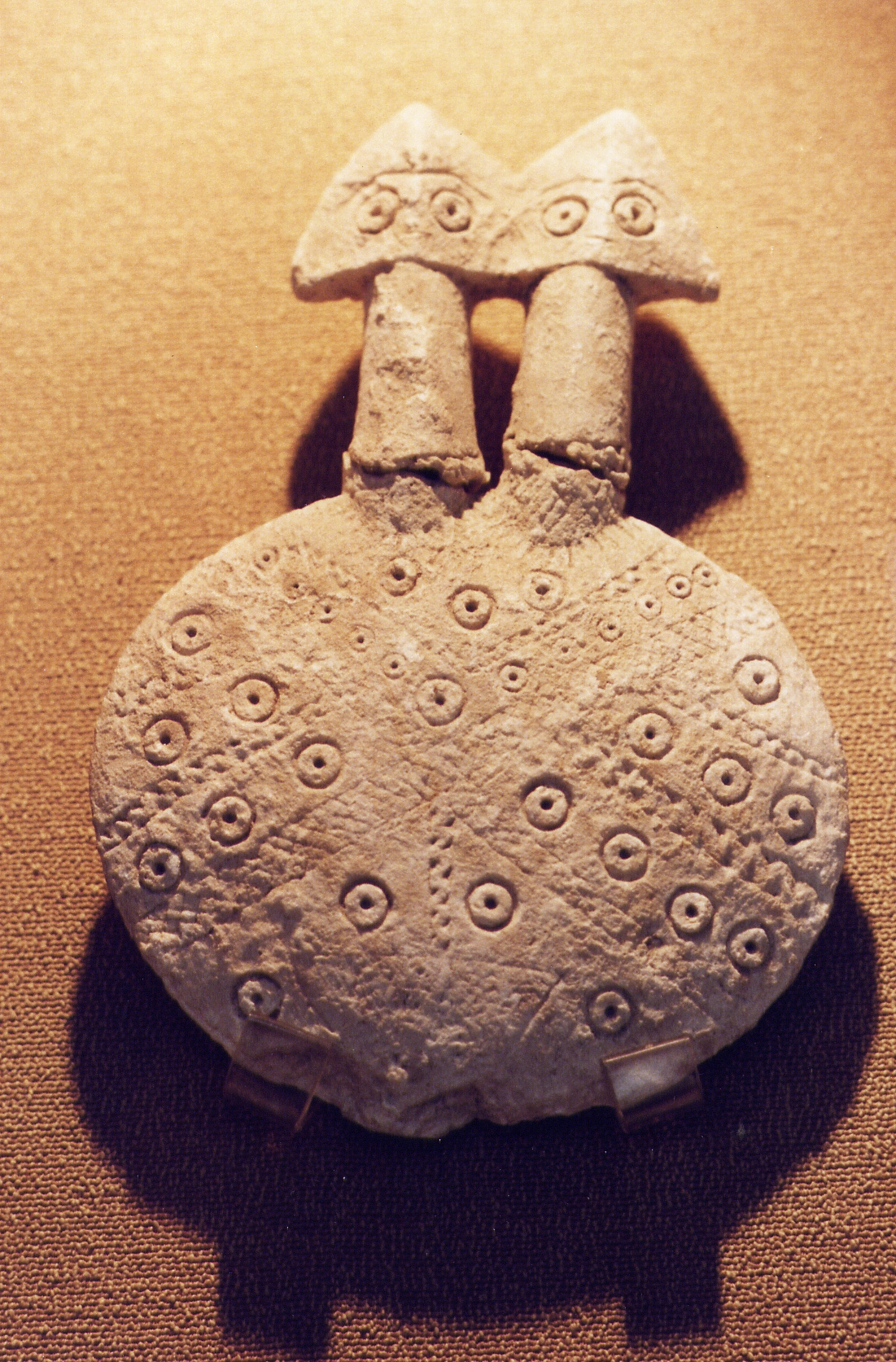
Artifacts in Museum of Anatolian Civilizations

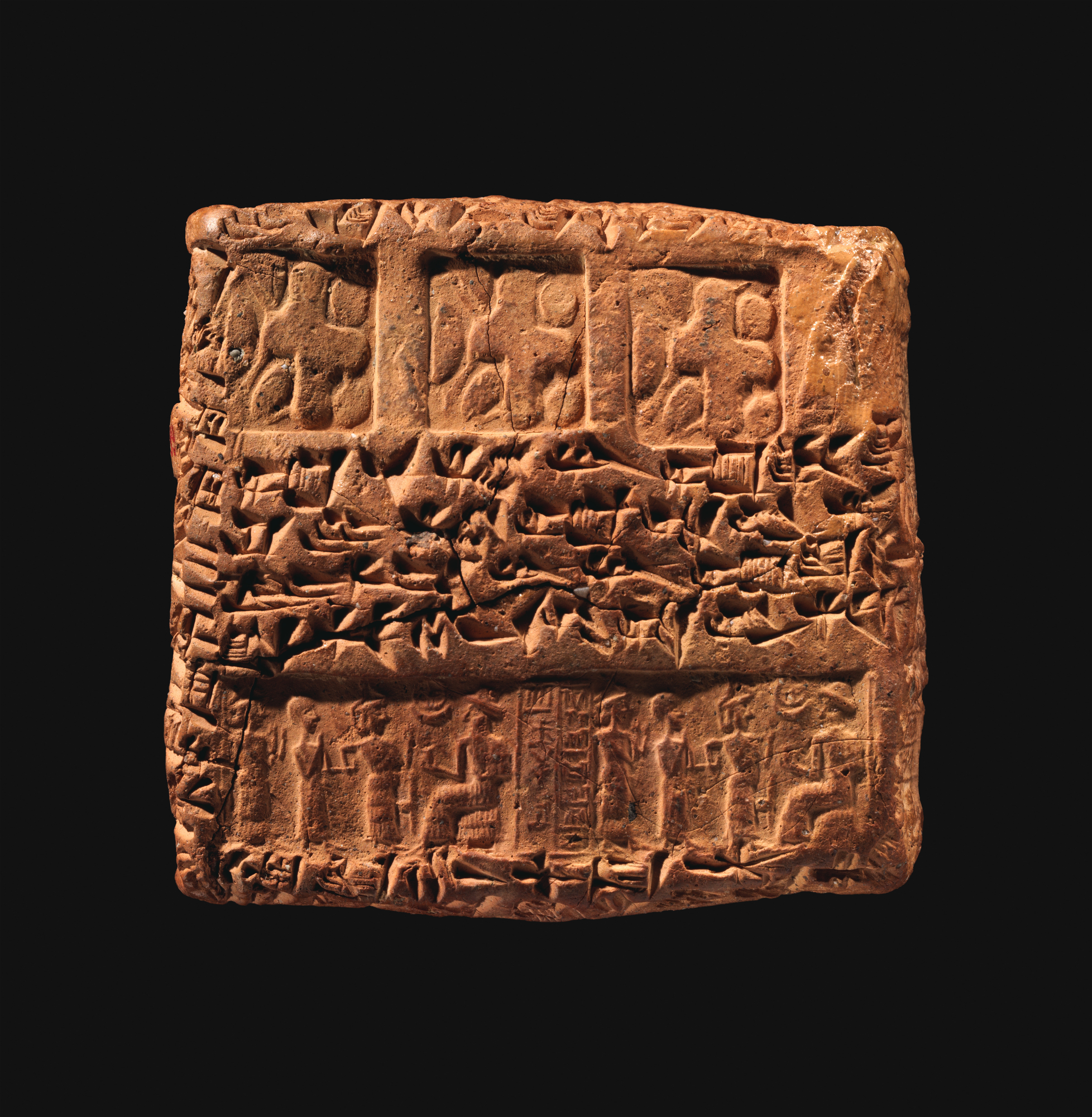
Clay tablet inscribed with seal impressions

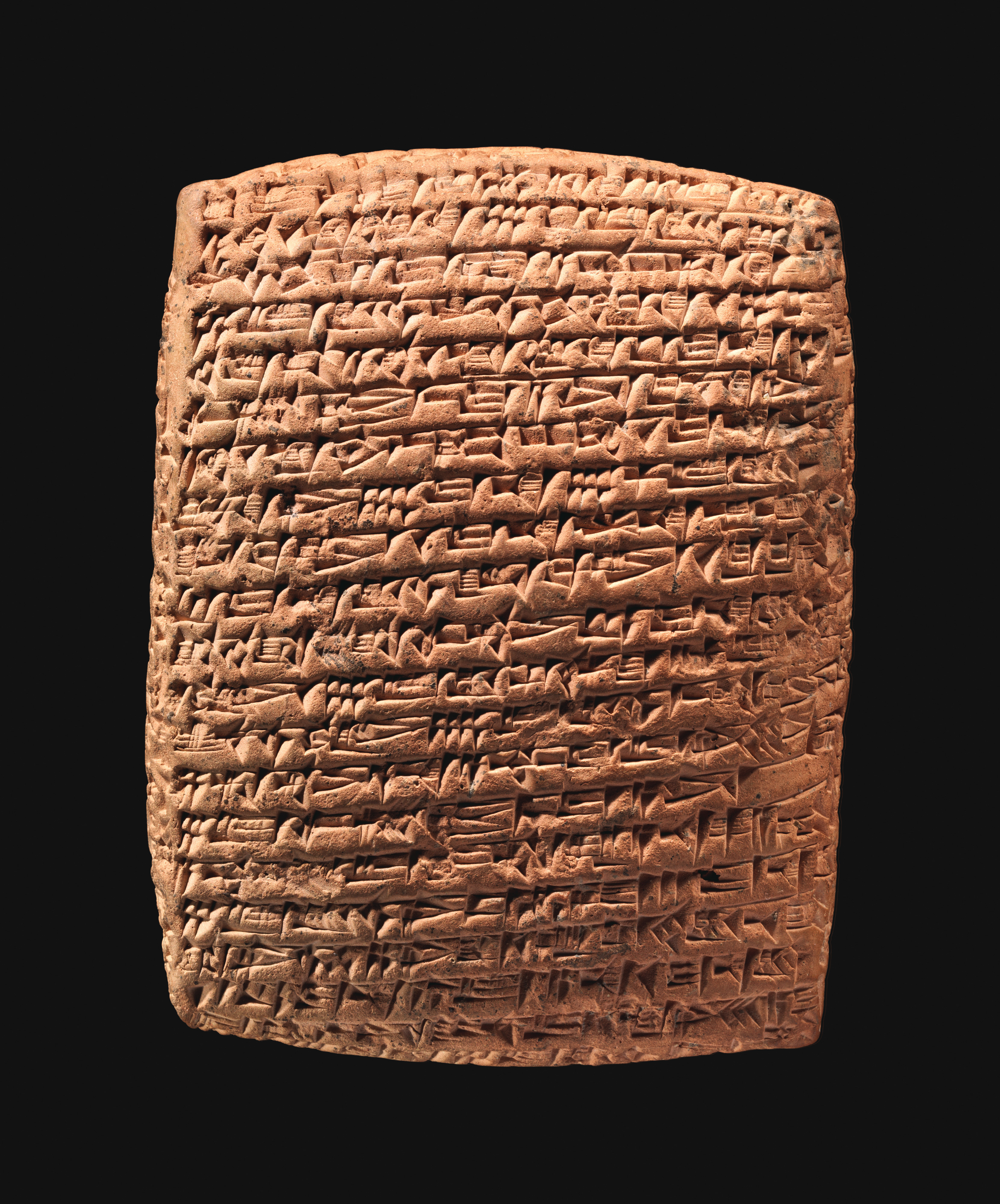
Cuneiform tablet

By 1880, cuneiform tablets said to be from Kara Eyuk ('black village') or Gyul Tepé ('burnt mound') near Kaisariyeh, had begun to appear on the market, some being thus bought by the British Museum. In response the site was worked by Ernest Chantre for two seasons, beginning in 1893. Hugo Grothe dug a small soundage in 1906. In 1925, Bedřich Hrozný excavated Kültepe and found over 1000 cuneiform tablets, some of which ended up in Prague and in Istanbul. In 1929 the site was visited and photographed by James Henry Breasted of the Oriental Institute of Chicago. There had been much digging for fertilizer, which had destroyed a quarter of the mound.

Modern archaeological work began in 1948, when Kültepe was excavated by a team from the Turkish Historical Society and the General Directorate of Antiquities and Museums. The team was led by Tahsin Özgüç until his death, in 2005. After 2005 the excavation was directed by Fikri Kulakoğlu.

- Level IV–III. Little excavation has been done for these levels, which represent the kārum's first habitation. No writing is attested, and archaeologists assume that both levels' inhabitants were illiterate.
- Level II, 1974–1836 BC (Mesopotamian middle chronology according to Veenhof). Craftsmen of this time and place specialised in animal-shaped earthen drinking vessels, which were often used for religious rituals. Assyrian merchants then established the kārum of the city: "Kaneš". Bullae of Naram-Sin of Eshnunna have been found toward the end of this level, which was burned to the ground.
- Level Ib, 1798–1740 BC. After an abandoned period, the city was rebuilt over the ruins of the old and again became a prosperous trade center. The trade was under the control of Ishme-Dagan I, who was put in control of Assur when his father, Shamshi-Adad I, conquered Ekallatum and Assur. However, the colony was again destroyed by fire. During excavations in 2001 140 cuneiform tablets were found in this level of the karum including a new rendition of the Kültepe eponym list.
- Level Ia. The city was reinhabited, but the Assyrian colony was no longer inhabited. The culture was early Hittite. Its name in Hittite acquired an extra sound as "Kaneša", which was more commonly contracted to "Neša".

Some attribute Level II's burning to the conquest of the city of Assur by the kings of Eshnunna, but Bryce blames it on the raid of Uhna. Some attribute Level Ib's burning to the fall of Assur, other nearby kings and eventually to Hammurabi of Babylon.

To date, over 22,000 cuneiform tablets have been recovered from the site, mainly from the kārum, with only 40 found in the Upper city.

Subsequent excavations attested the following stratigraphy of Kültepe:

Upper Town Level	Lower Town Level	Period	Name, Importance
18	—	Early Bronze Age I
17–14	—	Early Bronze Age II
13–11	—	Early Bronze Age III; 2500–2100 BC	Kaneš; first written as Ga-ni-šu ki Level 12 temple (megaron) and Level 11b building with pilasters
10	IV	Middle Bronze Age; 2100–2000 BC	Beginning of urban development
9	III	Middle Bronze Age; 2000–1970 BC
8	II	kārum-period 1974/1927–1836 BC	Kaniš; Anatolian center of Assyrian trade
7	Ib	kārum-period 1832/1800–1719 BC	Kaniš; Assyrian trading center
6	Ia	Old Hittite period	Neša; the place no longer has a central function
Settlement gap
5–4	—	Iron Age; 9/8 century BC	important central location in the Neo-Hittite state Tabal
Settlement gap
3	Graves	Hellenistic Age	Anisa; Polis; Coin finds from 323 BC
2–1	Graves	Roman Age	insignificant settlement; Coin finds up to 180 AD

Recently, in "a small cell-plan structure cutting the walls of the monumental building [o]f Kültepe [Level 13], dated to the second half of the 3rd Millennium BC, statuettes made of alabaster with various attributes and ritual vessels in unprecedented forms were found in situ," and inside a "monumental building [d]iscovered in 2018 [which] contains a room called the 'idol room,' [a] collection of the largest number of idols and statuettes ever discovered in the ancient Near East [was found]."

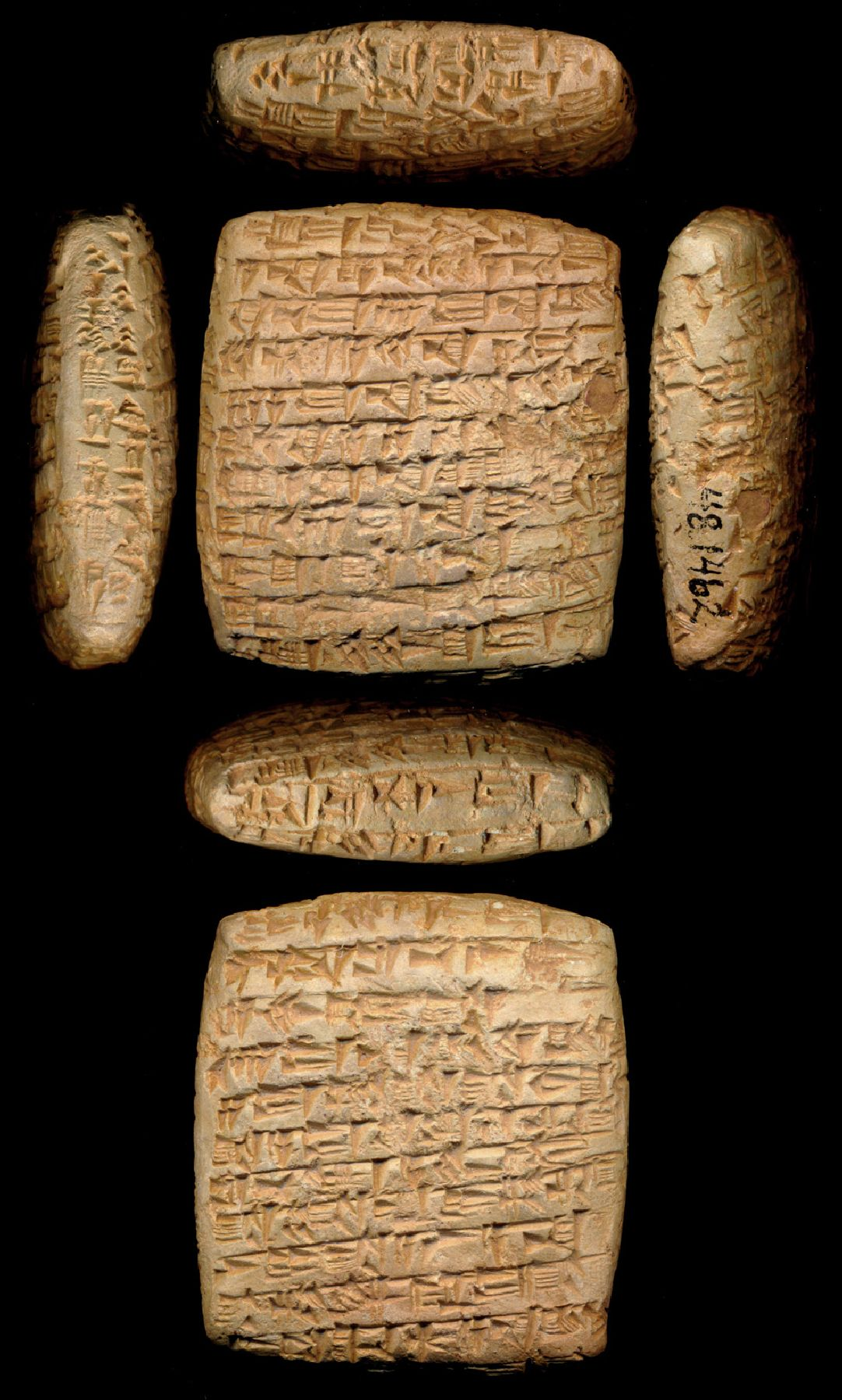
Around 20,000 clay tablets were found at the site of Kültepe

=== Kārum Kaneš ===
The quarter of the city that most interests historians is the kārum, a portion of the city that was set aside by local officials for the early Assyrian merchants to use without paying taxes as long as the goods remained inside the kārum. The term kārum means "port" in Akkadian, the lingua franca of the time, but its meaning was later extended to refer to any trading colony whether or not it bordered water.

Several other cities in Anatolia also had a kārum, but the largest was Kaneš, whose important kārum was inhabited by soldiers and merchants from Assyria for hundreds of years. They traded local tin and wool for luxury items, foodstuffs, spices and woven fabrics from the Assyrian homeland and Elam.

The remains of the kārum form a large circular mound 500 m in diameter and about 20 m above the plain (a tell). The kārum settlement is the result of several superimposed stratigraphic periods. New buildings were constructed on top of the remains of the earlier periods so there is a deep stratigraphy from prehistoric times to the early Hittite period.

The kārum was destroyed by fire at the end of levels II and Ib. The inhabitants left most of their possessions behind, as found by modern archaeologists.

The findings have included numerous baked-clay tablets, some of which were enclosed in clay envelopes stamped with cylinder seals. The documents record common activities, such as trade between the Assyrian colony and the city-state of Assur and between Assyrian merchants and local people. The trade was run by families rather than the state. The Kültepe texts are the oldest documents from Anatolia. Although they are written in Old Assyrian, the Hittite loanwords and names in the texts are the oldest record of any Indo-European language. Most of the archaeological evidence is typical of Anatolia rather than of Assyria, but the use of both cuneiform and the dialect is the best indication of Assyrian presence.

=== Dating of Waršama Sarayi ===
At Level II, the destruction was so total that no wood survived for dendrochronological studies. In 2003, researchers from Cornell University dated wood in level Ib from the rest of the city, built centuries earlier. The dendrochronologists date the bulk of the wood from buildings of the Waršama Sarayi to 1832 BC, with further refurbishments up to 1779 BC. In 2016 new research using radiocarbon dating and dendrology on timber used in this site and the palace in Acemhöyük show the likely earliest use of the palace as not before 1851–1842 BC (68.2% hpd) or 1855–1839 BC (95.4% hpd). In combination with the many Assyrian objects found here, this dating shows that only middle or low-middle chronology are the only remaining possible chronologies that fit these new data.

== Women at Kaneš ==
The cuneiform archives provide an extraordinary amount of information about daily life for women at Kaneš, including Assyrian women living in the city. Using this data, scholars have developed biographies for several of the women who either lived in the city or who had relatives in the city.

=== Zizizi ===
Zizizi was an Assyrian businesswoman at Kaneš, wife of an Assyrian merchant, and known for expressive letters delivered on ancient clay tablets written in cuneiform. Her journey started around 1860 B.C., when she followed her first husband to the Anatolian city of Kaneš. He later died and she remarried a local. Her father Imdi-ilum and mother Ishtar-bashti responded to her leaving home by stating "we are not important in your eyes". In Kaneš, Zizizi became a successful moneylender, providing support for the conclusion that "the tablets women wrote indicate that they served crucial roles in trading networks, managed finances and workers, and pushed against societal expectations..." An archived tablet found at Kaneš holds a letter from Zizizi to her parents which was written during an outbreak of disease, and shows her expressing anguish during that time. The tablet copy 688 found in a private archive at the city displays Zizizi expressing her emotional circumstances by stating "I can’t manage anymore."

=== Taram-Kubi ===
Taram-Kubi was an Assyrian businesswoman of the 19th c. BCE. She was married to Innaya, had a son, Ikuppiya, and had two siblings; her brother, Imdī-ilum, and a sister, Simat-Assur. Taram-Kubi lived in Assur while her husband lived and worked in Kaneš. Taram-Kubi was business partners with Innaya, and they communicated through cuneiform clay tablets transported by caravans between Assur and Kaneš. Taram-Kubi crafted textiles that were highly sought after, which were then sent to Innaya in Kaneš, where he would sell them and send silver back. Taram-Kubi was wealthy, having enough funds to lend silver to her brother for purchasing a house. She also covered a debt her husband had to city administration in Assur, which she then demanded he repay afterward. She also worked with authorities to resolve a lawsuit her husband had been involved in regarding suspicious sales of lapis lazuli. Although Tarem-Kubi was an independent woman and had arguments with and placed demands on her husband from their business dealings, she still missed him and in her letters requested he return to Assur to be by her side. One example of their quarrels included Innaya emptying their house of barley before he left for Kaneš, and then a famine coming, leaving Taram-Kubi with no food for her and their child. Her letters on the clay tablets showcased a more emotional side of communication, whereas the male counterpart's tablet communications were often more business-oriented.

== See also ==
- Hittite sites
- Cities of the ancient Near East
- List of archaeologically attested women from the ancient Mediterranean region
- Short chronology timeline
- Tahsin Özgüç
- Old Assyrian Period

== Sources ==
- Albayrak, Irfan, "The Toponym Balīhum in the Kültepe Texts", Altorientalische Forschungen, vol. 35, no. 1, pp. 28–34, 2009
- Akurgal, Ekrem (2001). The Hattian and Hittite Civilizations. Ankara: Ministry of Culture. ISBN 978-975-17-2756-5.
- Bachvarova, Mary R. (2010). "Manly Deeds: Hittite Admonitory History and Eastern Mediterranean Didactic Epic". Epic and History. Chichester: John Wiley & Sons. pp. 66–85. ISBN 978-1-4443-1564-6.
- Barjamovic, Gojko (2011). A Historical Geography of Anatolia in the Old Assyrian Colony Period. Copenhagen: Museum Tusculanum Press. ISBN 978-87-635-3645-5.
- Bryce, Trevor R. (2002). Life and Society in the Hittite World. New York: Oxford University Press. ISBN 978-0-19-924170-5.
- Bryce, Trevor R. (2005) [1998]. The Kingdom of the Hittites (2nd revised ed.). New York: Oxford University Press. ISBN 978-0-19-927908-1.
- Bryce, Trevor R. (2009). The Routledge Handbook of the Peoples and Places of Ancient Western Asia: The Near East from the Early Bronze Age to the fall of the Persian Empire. London-New York: Routledge. ISBN 978-1-134-15907-9.
- Bryce, Trevor R. (2014). "Hittites and Anatolian Ethnic Diversity". A Companion to Ethnicity in the Ancient Mediterranean. Chichester: John Wiley & Sons. pp. 127–141. ISBN 978-1-4443-3734-1.
- Burney, Charles A. (2004). Historical Dictionary of the Hittites. Lanham: Scarecrow Press. ISBN 978-0-8108-6564-8.
- Gilan, Amir (2010). "Epic and History in Hittite Anatolia: In Search of a Local Hero". Epic and History. Chichester: John Wiley & Sons. pp. 51–65. ISBN 978-1-4443-1564-6.
- Gilan, Amir (2018). "In Search of a Distant Past: Forms of Historical Consciousness in Hittite Anatolia" (PDF). Anadolu. 44: 1–23. Archived (PDF) from the original on 2024-03-09.
- Glatz, Claudia (2020). The Making of Empire in Bronze Age Anatolia: Hittite Sovereign Practice, Resistance, and Negotiation. Cambridge: Cambridge University Press. ISBN 978-1-108-49110-5.
- Goodnick-Westenholz, Joan (1997). Legends of the Kings of Akkade: The Texts. Winona Lake: Eisenbrauns. ISBN 978-0-931464-85-0.
- Goodnick-Westenholz, Joan (2010). "Historical Events and the Process of Their Transformation in Akkadian Heroic Traditions". Epic and History. Chichester: John Wiley & Sons. pp. 26–50. ISBN 978-1-4443-1564-6.
- Mellaart, J., Anatolian Chronology in the Early and Middle Bronze Age, 1957, Anatolian Studies, vol.7, pp. 55–88
- Michel, Cécile (2014). "Considerations on the Assyrian settlement at Kanesh". Current Research at Kültepe-Kanesh: An Interdisciplinary and Integrative Approach to Trade Networks, Internationalism, and Identity (in undetermined language). pp. 69–84. doi:10.5913/2014192.ch04. Wikidata Q130245408.
- Michel, Cécile (2020). Women of Assur and Kanesh: Texts from the Archives of Assyrian Merchants. ISBN 978-0-88414-455-7. LCCN 2020012833. Wikidata Q130241124.
- Strupler, Néhémie (2021). "An Overview of Sealing Practices at Kültepe" (PDF). Cultural Exchange and Current Research in Kültepe and its Surroundings Kültepe. Turnhout: Brepols. pp. 181–196.
- Tahsin Özgüç, Kültepe, Yapi Kredi, 2005, ISBN 975-08-0960-2
- Powell, W.; et al. (December 20, 2023). "Tin isotopes reveal changing patterns of tin trade, connectivity and consumption from Anatolia and Central Asia at Kültepe". Journal of Archaeological Science. 162 105917. doi:10.1016/j.jas.2023.105917. Archived from the original on December 28, 2023.
- Veenhof, K. R., Kanesh: an Old Assyrian colony in Anatolia, in Civilizations of the Ancient Near East ed. by J. Sasson, Scribners, 1995
- Veenhof, Klaas R.. "Some displaced Tablets from Kārum Kanesh (Kültepe)", Altorientalische Forschungen, vol. 35, no. 1, pp. 10–27, 2009
