= Hittites =

Ancient Anatolian people

Hittite Empire 𒆳𒌷𒄩𒀜𒋾 (KUR URU.ḪattI)
- c. 1650 BC–c. 1190 BC
- Royal seal of the king Šuppiluliuma I and Tawananna

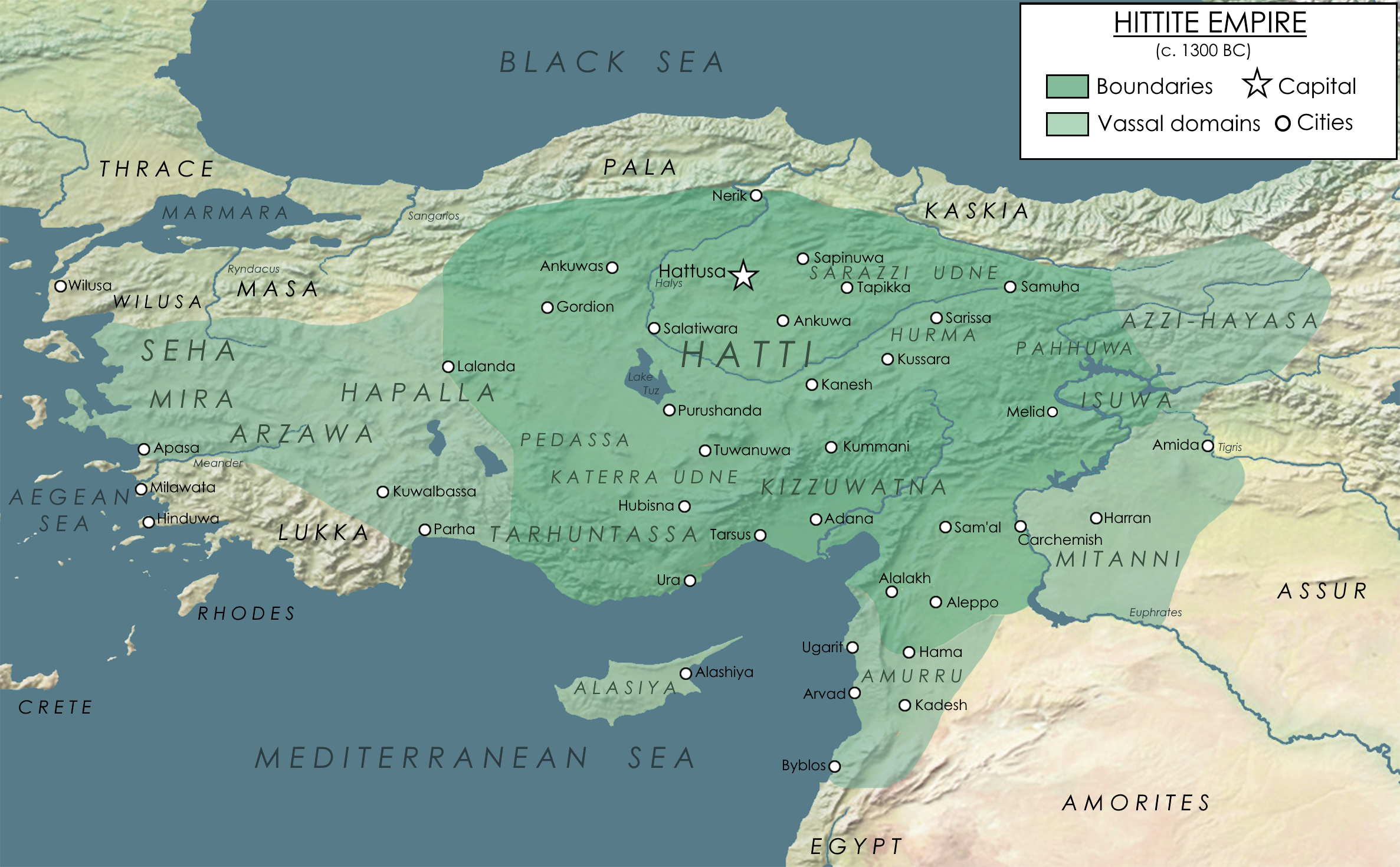
- Map of the Hittite Empire at its greatest extent, with Hittite rule c. 1300 BC
- Capital: Hattusa; Šamuḫa (In exile under Tudḫaliya III); Tarḫuntašša (Regnal period of Muwatalli II)
- Capital-in-exile: Šamuḫa (1400–1350 BC)
- Common languages: Hittite, Hattic, Luwian, Hurrian
- Religion: Hittite religion
- Government: Monarchy
- King
  - c. 1650 BC: Labarna I (first)
  - c. 1210–1190 BC: Šuppiluliuma II (last)
- Historical era: Bronze Age
  - Established: c. 1650 BC
  - Disestablished: c. 1190 BC

Population
  - Estimate: 200,000+
- Currency: Barter economy, gold, copper, silver and bronze common barter items of value.
Preceded by
Hattians
Kussara
Kanesh
Purushanda
Pala (Anatolia)
Third Eblaite Kingdom
Kizzuwatna
Assuwa
Arzawa
Wilusa
Alashiya
Mitanni
Succeeded by
Kaskians
Mushki
Urumeans
Syro-Hittite states
Tabal
Kummuh
Carchemish
Phrygia
Lydia
- Today part of: Turkey; Syria; Lebanon; Cyprus

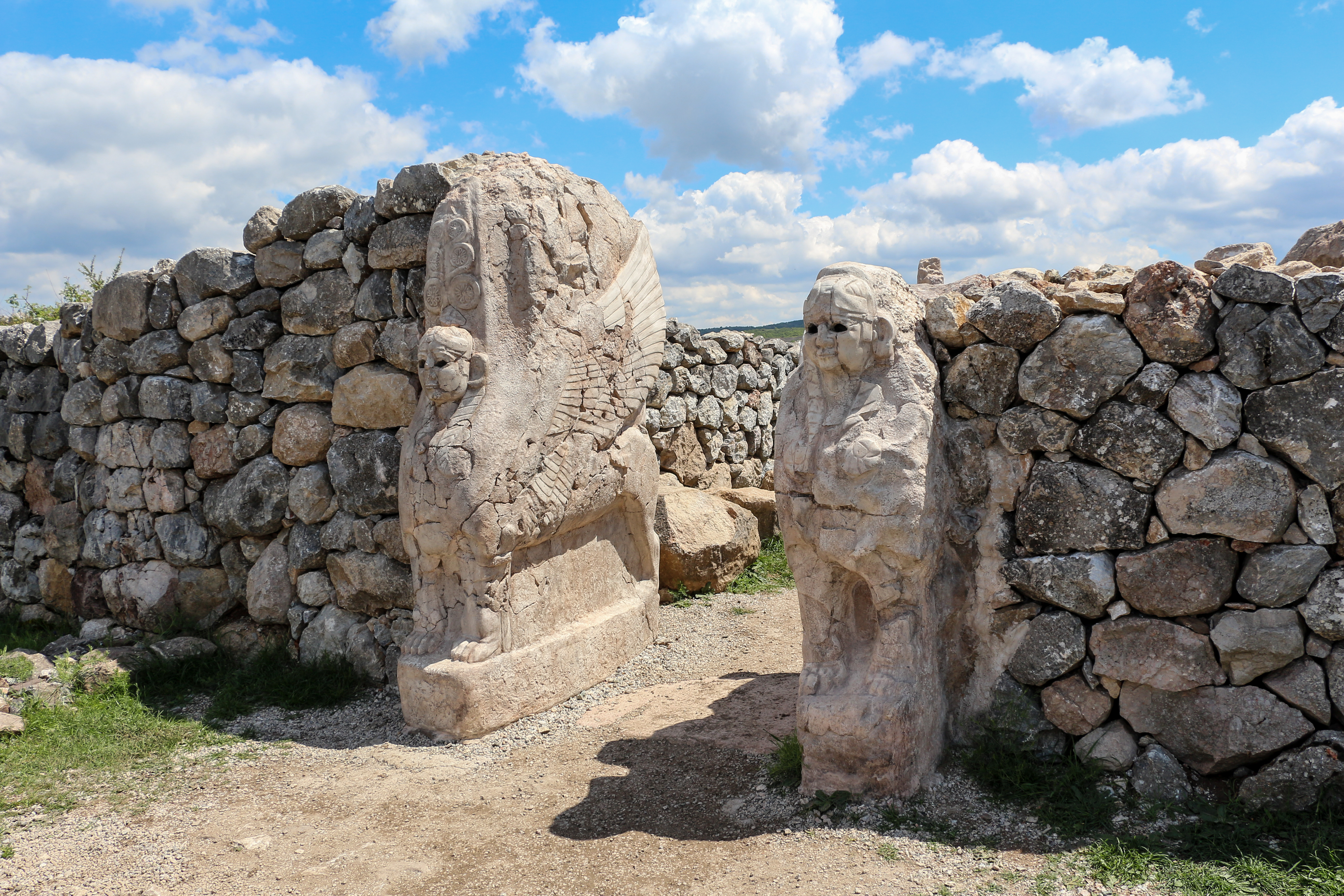
Sphinx Gate entrance to the city

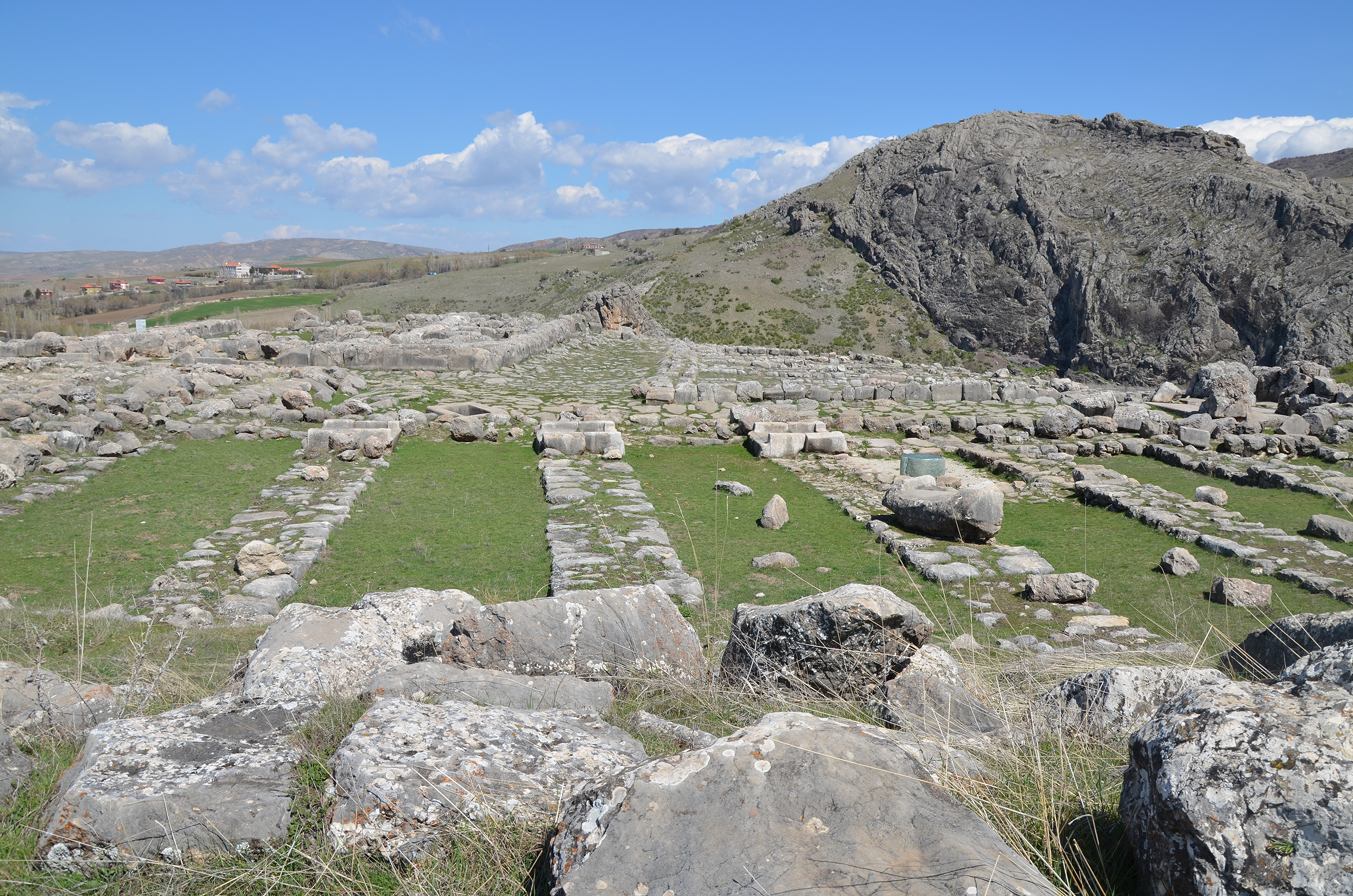
The Great Temple in the inner city of Hattusa

The Hittites (/ˈhɪtaɪts/) were an Anatolian Indo-European people who formed one of the first major civilizations of the Bronze Age in West Asia. The Hittite's ancestors migrated from the Proto-Indo-European homeland in the Pontic–Caspian steppe, arriving in central Anatolia some time before 2000 BC. They formed a succession of polities including Kussara (before 1750 BC), the Kanesh or Neša (c. 1750–1650 BC), and then an empire with its capital at Hattusa. The Hittite Empire reached its peak in the mid-14th century BC, encompassing most of Anatolia and parts of northern Syria and Upper Mesopotamia, and bordering the rival empires of the Hurri-Mitanni and Assyrians.

From the 15th to 13th centuries BC, the Hittites were a major power of the Near East, coming into conflict with the New Kingdom of Egypt, the Middle Assyrian Empire, and the empire of Mitanni. By the 12th century, much of the Hittite Empire had been annexed by the Middle Assyrian Empire. In the aftermath of the Late Bronze Age collapse at the end of the 12th century, the Hittites splintered into several small independent states; some of these survived into the 8th century BC before being absorbed into the Neo-Assyrian Empire. Lacking a unifying continuity, their descendants scattered and ultimately merged into the modern populations of the Levant and Mesopotamia.

The Hittite language belongs to the Anatolian branch of the Indo-European language family; it and the closely-related Luwian language are the oldest historically attested Indo-European languages.

== Etymology ==
The Hittites called their kingdom Hattusa (Hatti in Akkadian), a name received from the Hattians, an earlier people who had inhabited and ruled the central Anatolian region until the beginning of the second millennium BC, and who spoke an unrelated language known as Hattic. The modern conventional name "Hittites" is due to the initial identification of the people of Hattusa with the Biblical Hittites by 19th-century archaeologists, a view that has since come under greater academic scrutiny. The Hittites would have called themselves something closer to "Neshites" or "Neshians" after the city of Nesha, which flourished for some two hundred years until a king named Labarna renamed himself Hattusili I (meaning "the man of Hattusa") sometime around 1650 BC and established his capital city at Hattusa.

== Modern discovery ==
French scholar Charles Texier was the first modern investigator to encounter Hittite ruins, in 1834, near the village of Boğazköy in modern Turkey. Texier found what he described as "a city as big as Athens in its golden age". He wrote of finding a wall with two massive doors, one with a low relief representing a human form and another door decorated with stone lions. This was Hattusa, the Hittite capital. Texier was not aware of what he had uncovered; he was seeking the ruins of ancient Tavium on the shore of the old Halys River (Kızılırmak River) in modern Turkey.

Charles Texier companions' drawing during the first coummented archeological visit to Hattusa.

The earliest written attestation of the Hittites is in tablets found at the karum of Kanesh (now called Kültepe) which contain accounting records between Assyrian merchants and a "land of Hatti". Some names in the tablets were neither Hattic nor Assyrian, but clearly Indo-European.

The script on a monument at Boğazkale by a "People of Hattusas" discovered by William Wright in 1884 was found to match peculiar hieroglyphic scripts from Aleppo and Hama in Northern Syria. In 1887, excavations at Amarna in Egypt uncovered the diplomatic correspondence of Pharaoh Amenhotep III and his son, Akhenaten. Two of the letters from a "kingdom of Kheta"—apparently located in the same general region as the Mesopotamian references to "land of Hatti"—were written in standard Akkadian cuneiform, but in an unknown language.

British Assyriologist and linguist Archibald Sayce proposed that Hatti or Khatti in Anatolia was identical with the "kingdom of Kheta" mentioned in these Egyptian texts, as well as with the biblical Hittites. Others, such as Max Müller, agreed that Khatti was probably Kheta, but proposed connecting it with Biblical Kittim rather than with the Biblical Hittites. Sayce's identification came to be widely accepted over the course of the early 20th century; the name "Hittite" became attached to the civilization uncovered at Boğazköy. The Amarna letters also reference names of the kings of the Mittani which at the time were little known.

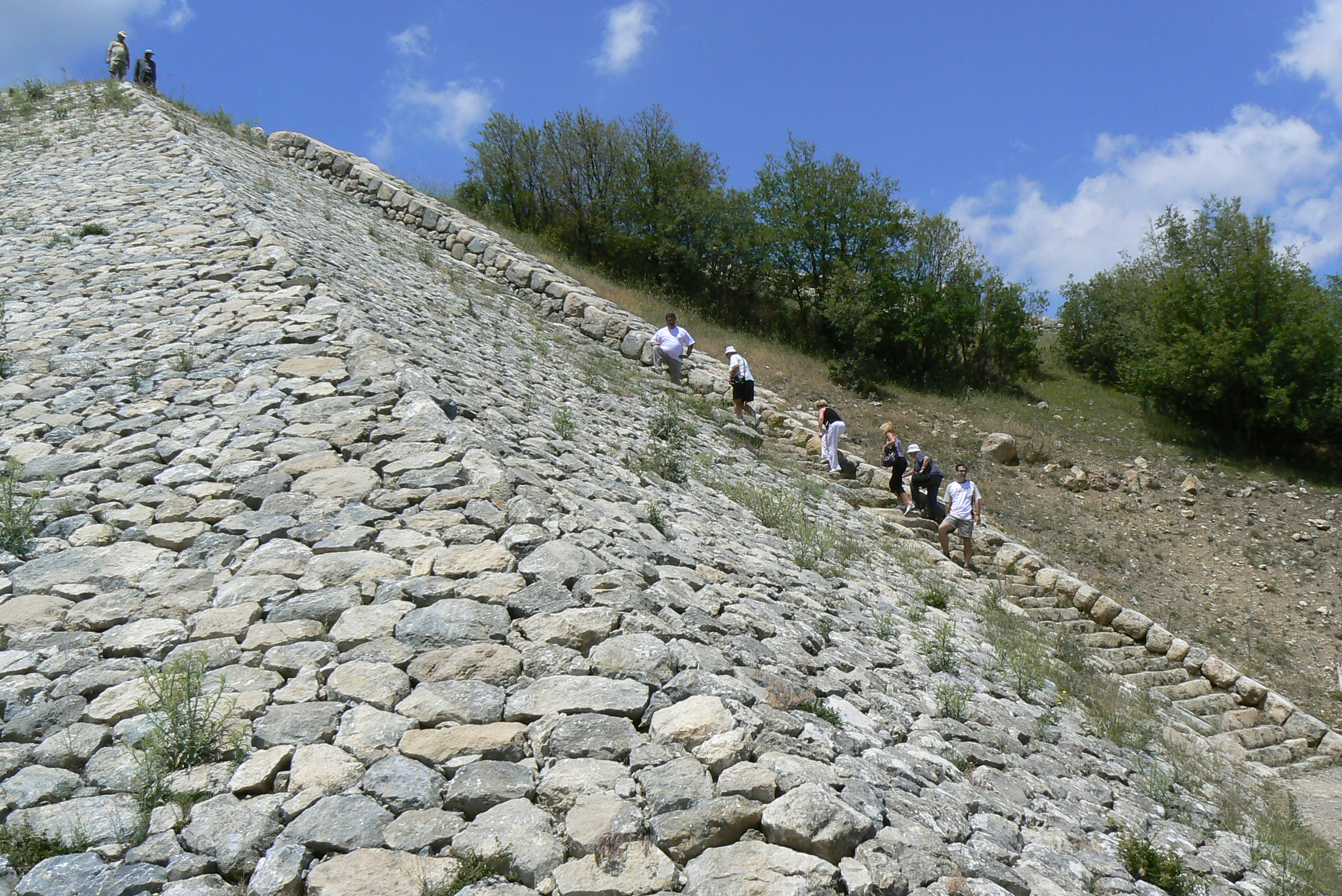
Hattusa ramp

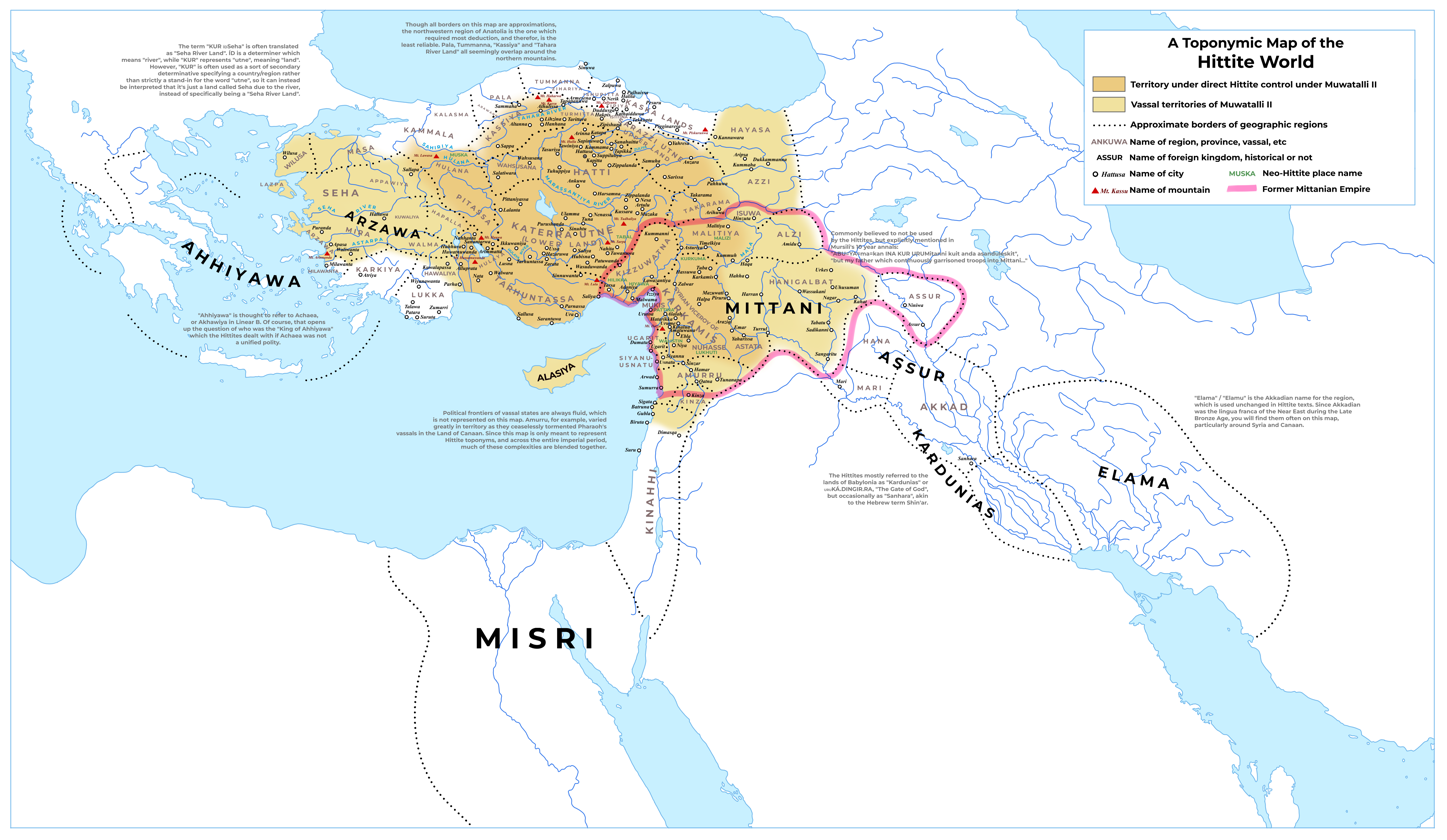
Map of Hittite place names

During sporadic excavations at Boğazköy (Hattusa) that began in 1906, the archaeologist Hugo Winckler found a royal archive with 10,000 tablets, inscribed in cuneiform Akkadian and the same unknown language as the Egyptian letters from Kheta—thus confirming the identity of the two names. He also proved that the ruins at Boğazköy were the remains of the capital of an empire that, at one point, controlled northern Syria.

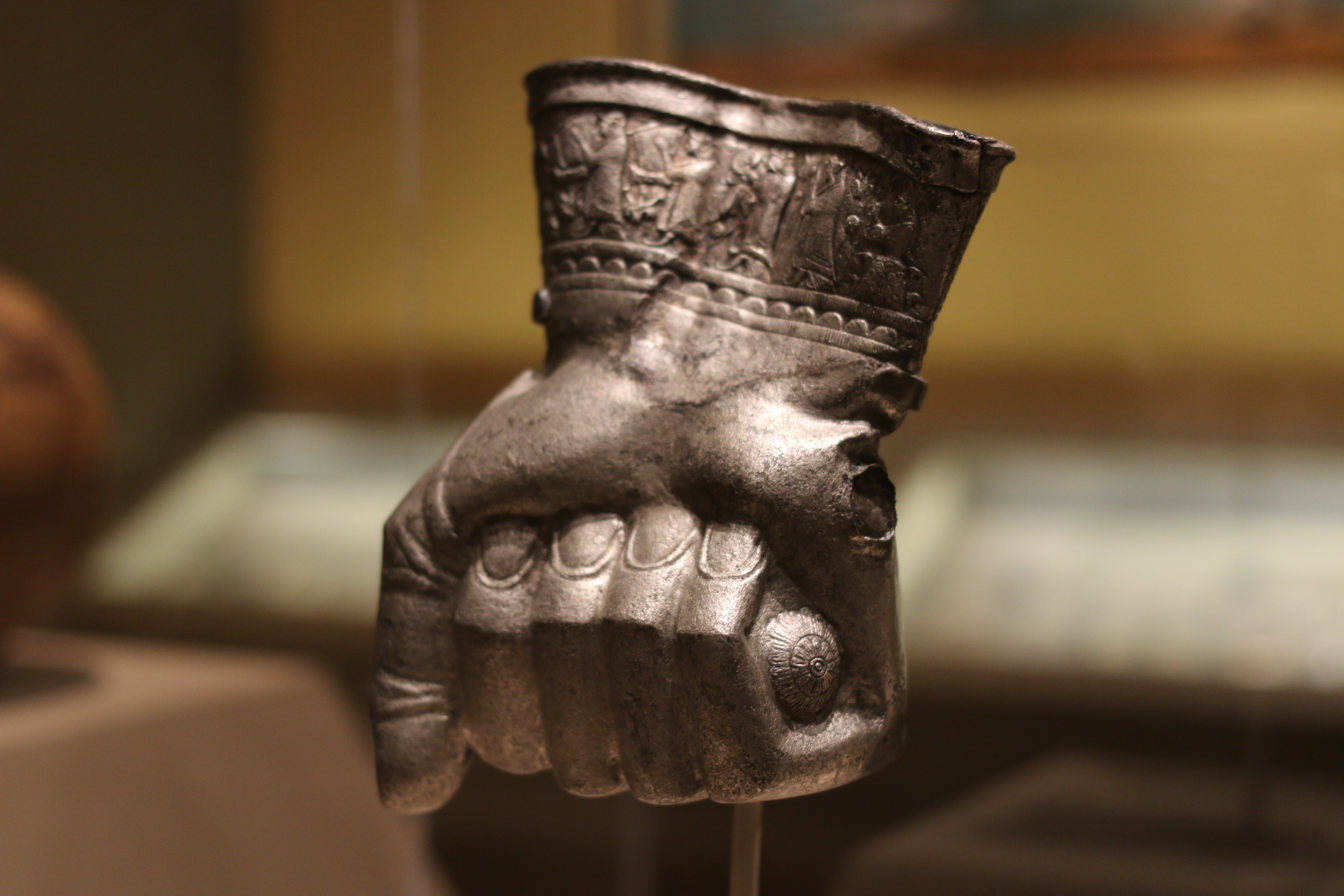
Drinking cup in the shape of a fist; 1400–1380 BC, Museum of Fine Arts, Boston

Under the direction of the German Archaeological Institute, excavations at Hattusa have been under way since 1907, with interruptions during the world wars. Kültepe was successfully excavated by Tahsin Özgüç from 1948 until 2005. Smaller scale excavations have also been carried out in the immediate surroundings of Hattusa, including the rock sanctuary of Yazılıkaya, which contains numerous rock reliefs portraying the Hittite rulers and the gods of the Hittite pantheon.

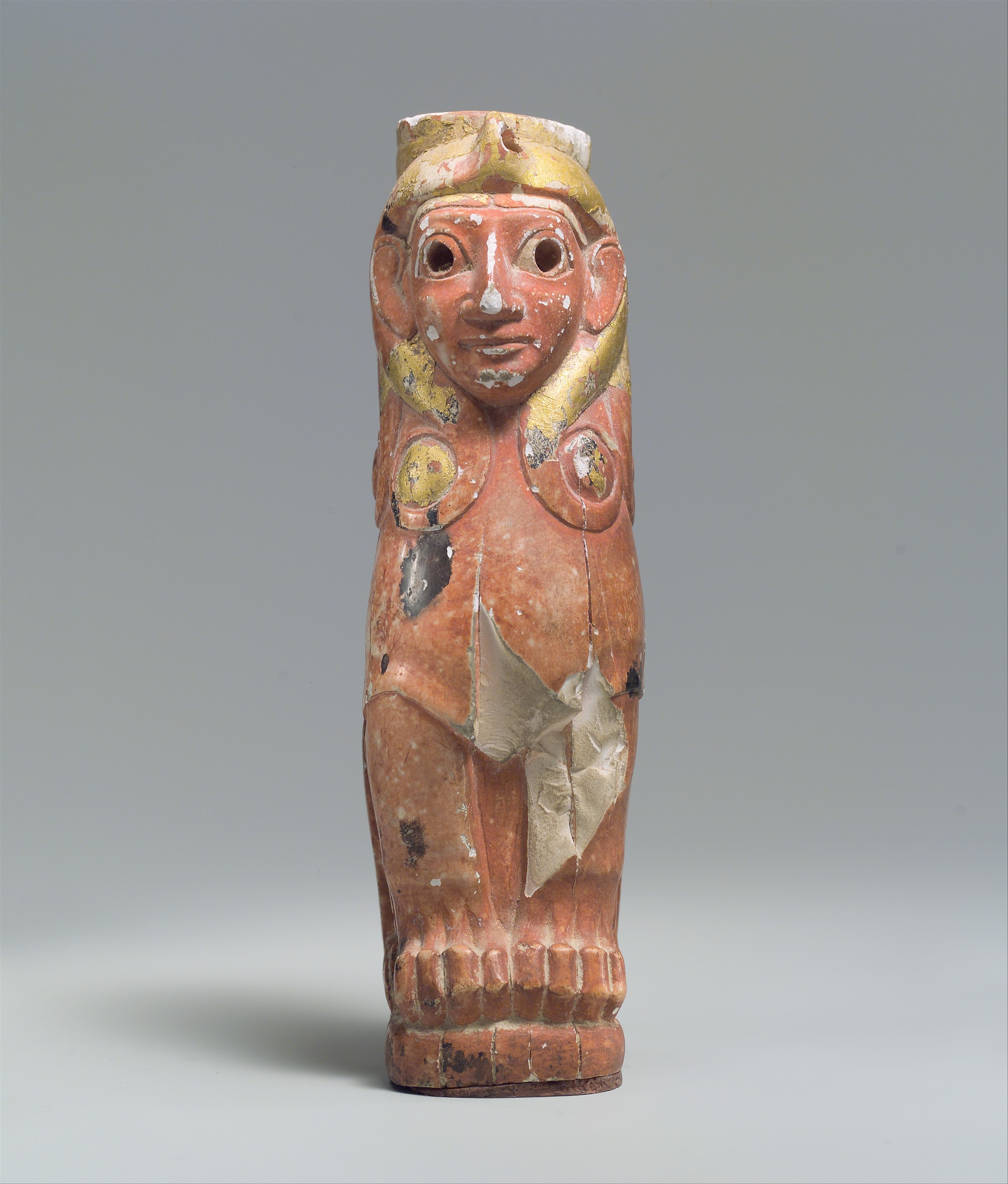
Ivory Hittite Sphinx, 18th century BC

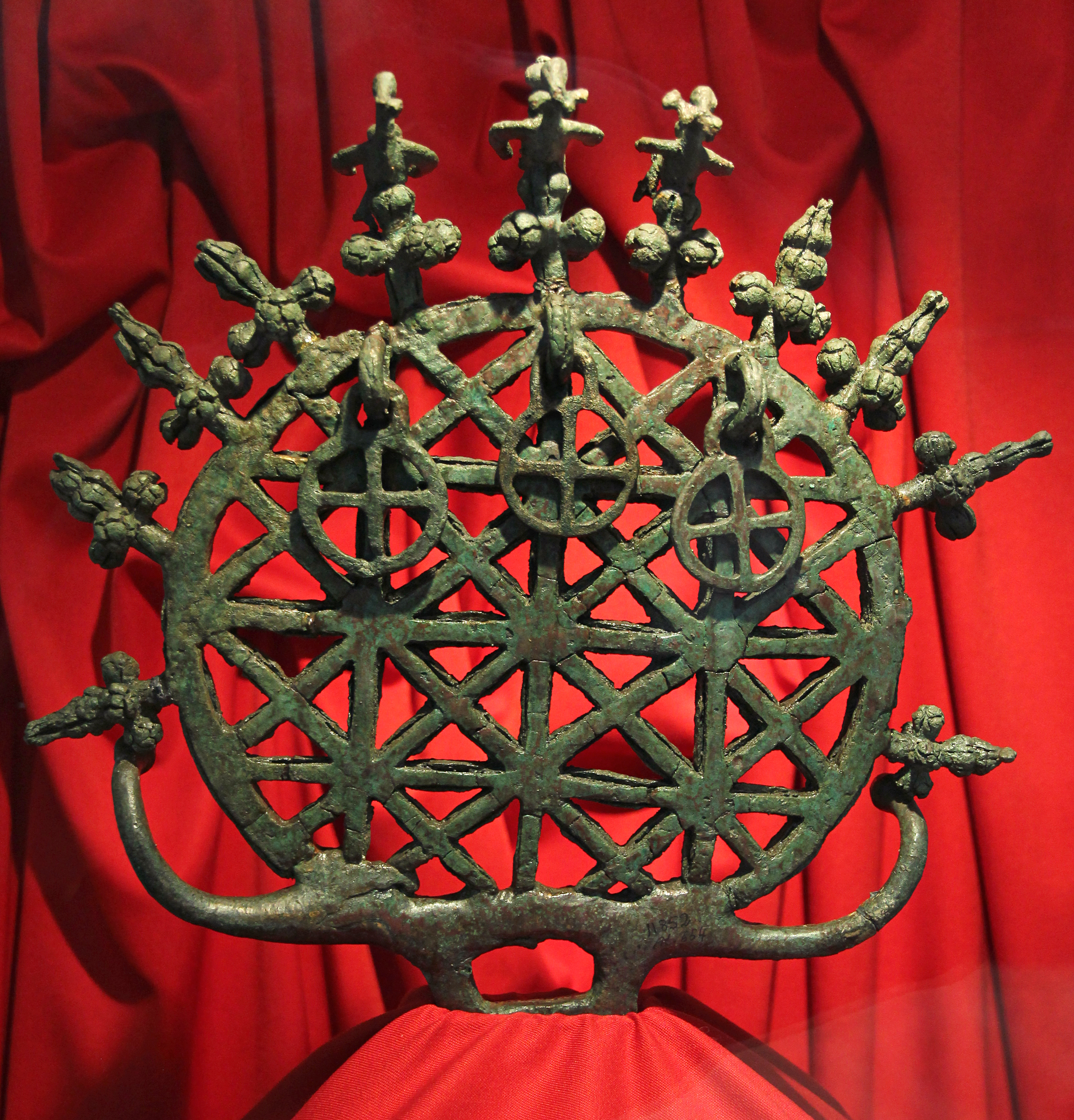
An Alaca Höyük bronze standard from a third millennium BC pre-Hittite tomb (Museum of Anatolian Civilizations, Ankara)

=== Writings ===
The Hittites used a variation of cuneiform called Hittite cuneiform. Archaeological expeditions to Hattusa have discovered entire sets of royal archives on cuneiform tablets, written either in Akkadian, the diplomatic language of the time, or in the various dialects of the Hittite confederation.

== Geography ==
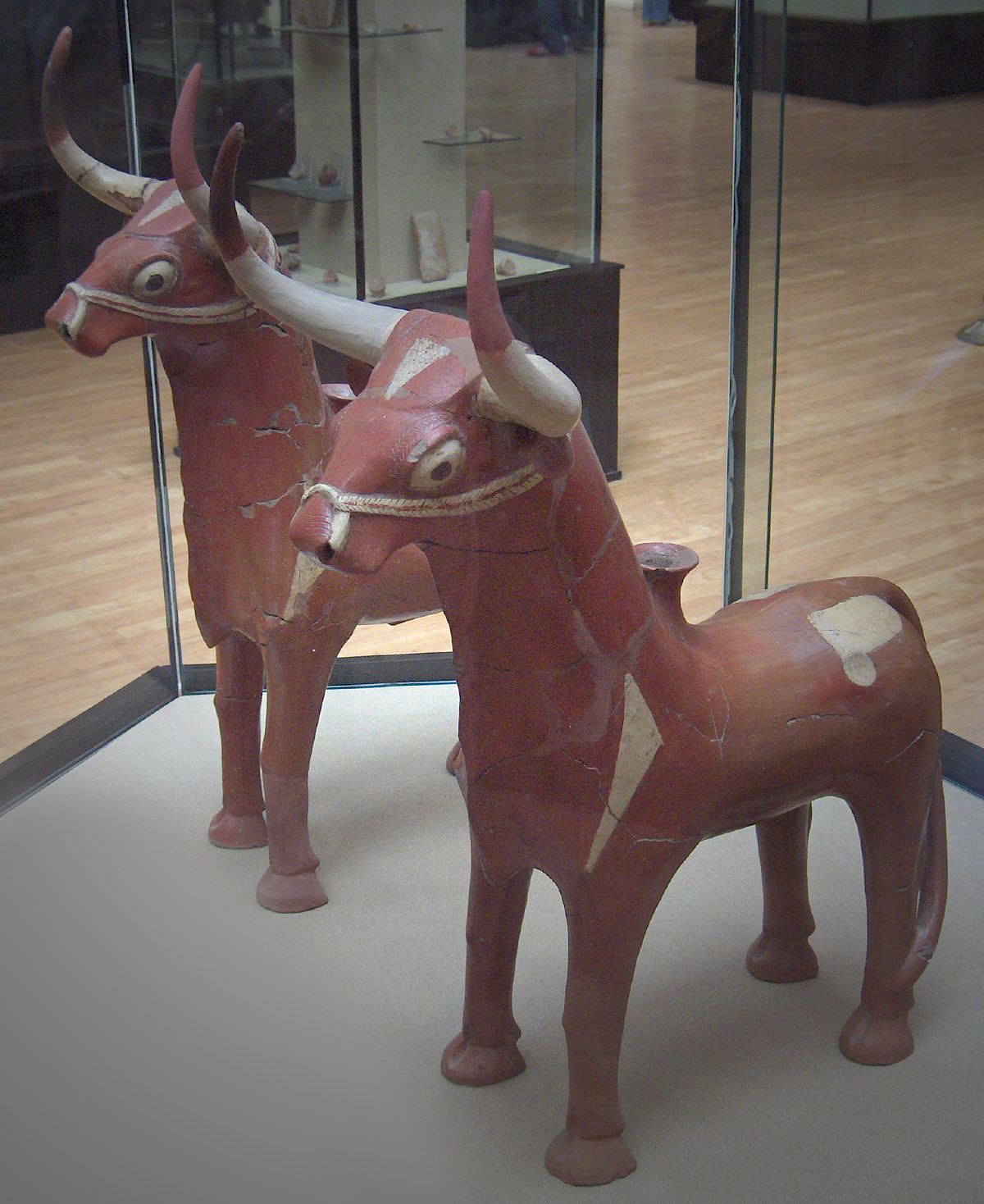
Ceremonial vessels in the shape of sacred bulls, called Hurri (Day) and Seri (Night) found in Hattusa, Hittite Old Kingdom (16th century BC) Museum of Anatolian Civilizations, Ankara

The Hittite kingdom was centered on the lands surrounding Hattusa and Neša (Kültepe), known as "the land Hatti" (^{URU}Ha-at-ti). After Hattusa was made the capital, the area encompassed by the bend of the Kızılırmak River (Hittite Marassantiya, Greek Halys) was considered the core of the Empire, and some Hittite laws make a distinction between "this side of the river" and "that side of the river". For example, the bounty for an escaped slave who had fled beyond the river is higher than for a slave caught on the near side.

To the west and south of the core territory lay the region known as Luwiya in the earliest Hittite texts. This terminology was replaced by the names Arzawa and Kizzuwatna with the rise of those kingdoms. Nevertheless, the Hittites continued to refer to the language that originated in these areas as Luwian. Prior to the rise of Kizzuwatna, the heart of that territory in Cilicia was first referred to by the Hittites as Adaniya. Upon its revolt from the Hittites during the reign of Ammuna, it assumed the name of Kizzuwatna and successfully expanded northward to encompass the lower Anti-Taurus Mountains as well. To the north lived the mountain people called the Kaskians. To the southeast of the Hittites lay the Hurrian empire of Mitanni.

At its peak during the reign of Muršili II, the Hittite empire stretched from Arzawa in the west to Mitanni in the east, and included many of the Kaskian territories north as far as Hayasa-Azzi in the far north-east, as well as south into Canaan near the southern border of Lebanon.

== Origins ==
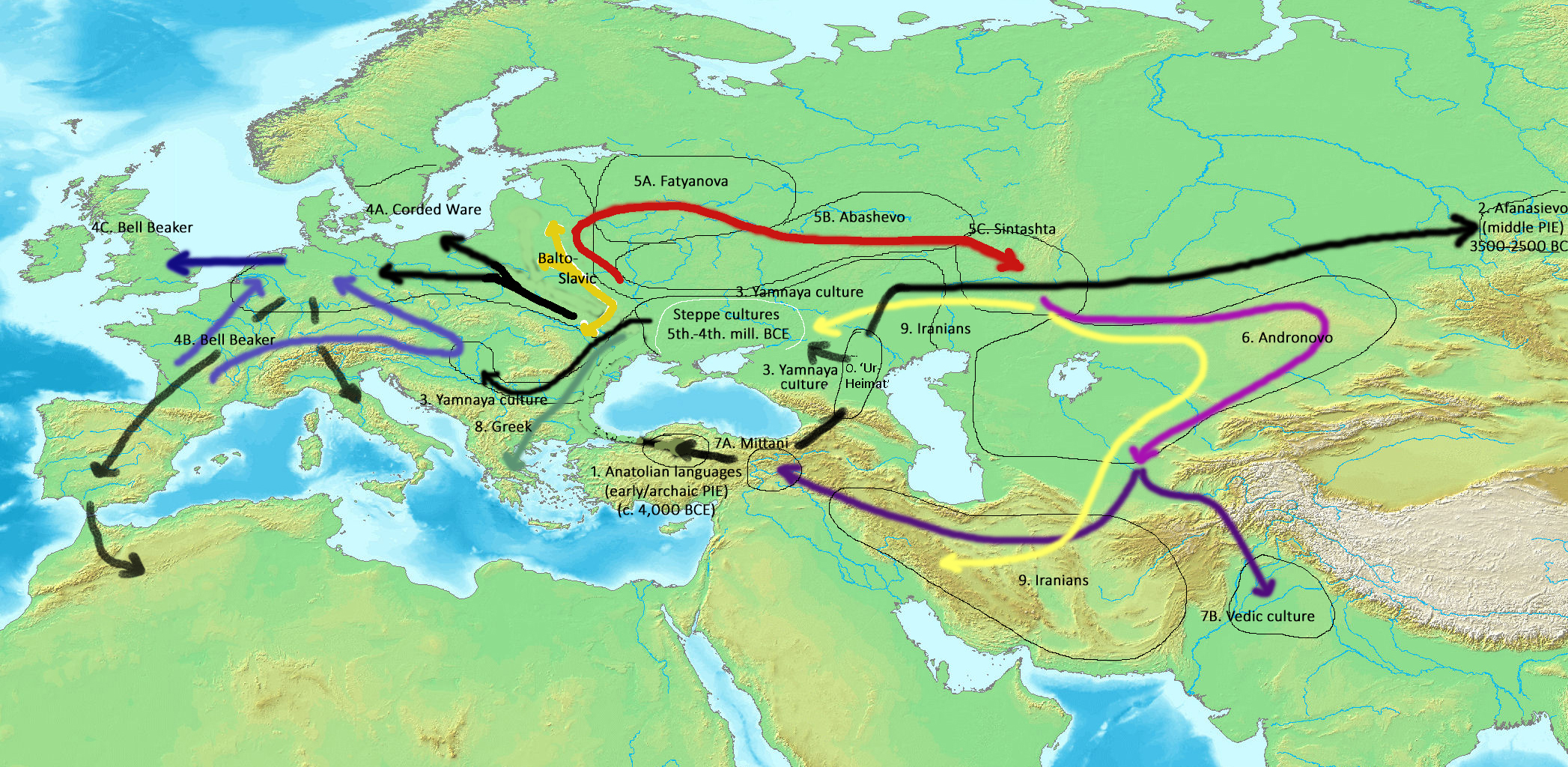
Scheme of Indo-European language dispersals from c. 4000 to 1000 BC according to the widely held Kurgan hypothesis. – Center: Steppe cultures 1 (black): Anatolian languages (archaic PIE) 2 (black): Afanasievo culture (early PIE) 3 (black) Yamnaya culture expansion (Pontic-Caspian steppe, Danube Valley) (late PIE) 4A (black): Western Corded Ware 4B-C (blue & dark blue): Bell Beaker; adopted by Indo-European speakers 5A-B (red): Eastern Corded ware 5C (red): Sintashta (proto-Indo-Iranian) 6 (magenta): Andronovo 7A (purple): Indo-Aryans (Mittani) 7B (purple): Indo-Aryans (India) [NN] (dark yellow): proto-Balto-Slavic 8 (grey): Greek 9 (yellow):Iranians – [not drawn]: Armenian, expanding from western steppe

The Early and Middle Late Bronze Age Anatolian samples from Kaman-Kalehöyük and Ovaören were modelled as being predominantly derived from a neolithic North Mesopotamian-like population, with the addition of around 10 percent ancestry from a Caucasus-Lower Volga steppe population. The researchers suggested the roots of the Anatolian languages originate from this steppe component.

The ancestors of the Hittites came into Anatolia between 4400 and 4100 BC, when the Anatolian language family split from Proto-Indo-European. Recent genetic and archaeological research has indicated that Proto-Anatolian speakers arrived in this region sometime between 5000 and 3000 BC. The Proto-Hittite language developed around 2100 BC, and the Hittite language itself is believed to have been in use in Central Anatolia between the 20th and 12th centuries BC. The Hittites are first associated with the kingdom of Kussara sometime prior to 1750 BC.

Hittites in Anatolia during the Bronze Age coexisted with Hattians and Hurrians, either by means of conquest or by gradual assimilation. Archaeological findings indicate connections between the Hittites, the Balkan Ezero culture, and the Caucasian Maykop culture; these connections have historically been interpreted as evidence of migration.

Analyses by David W. Anthony in 2007 concluded that steppe herders who were archaic Indo-European speakers spread into the lower Danube valley about 4200–4000 BC, either causing or taking advantage of the collapse of Old Europe. He thought their languages "probably included archaic Proto-Indo-European dialects of the kind partly preserved later in Anatolian," and that their descendants later moved into Anatolia at an unknown time but maybe as early as 3000 BC.

J. P. Mallory also thought it was likely that the Anatolians reached the Near East from the north either via the Balkans or the Caucasus in the 3rd millennium BC. According to Parpola, the appearance of Indo-European speakers from Europe into Anatolia, and the appearance of Hittite, was related to later migrations of Proto-Indo-European speakers from the Yamnaya culture into the Danube Valley at c. 2800 BC, which was in line with the "customary" assumption that the Anatolian Indo-European language was introduced into Anatolia sometime in the third millennium BC.

The Hittite language also borrowed many words related to agriculture from cultures on their eastern borders, indicating a migration route across the Caucasus and not the Balkans. The Yamnaya expansion into the Balkans carried a component of Eastern hunter-gatherer ancestry that does not exist in any ancient Anatolian DNA samples, indicating that the proto-Hittites and their cousin groups split off from the Proto-Indo-Europeans before the formation of the Yamnaya which did admix with Eastern Hunter Gatherers.

The dominant indigenous inhabitants in central Anatolia were Hurrians and Hattians who spoke non-Indo-European languages. Some have argued that Hattic was a Northwest Caucasian language, but its affiliation remains uncertain, whilst the Hurrian language was a near-isolate (i.e. it was one of only two or three languages in the Hurro-Urartian family). There were also Assyrian colonies in the region during the Old Assyrian Empire (2025–1750 BC); it was from the Assyrian speakers of Upper Mesopotamia that the Hittites adopted the cuneiform script. It took some time before the Hittites established themselves following the collapse of the Old Assyrian Empire in the mid-18th century BC, as is clear from some of the texts included here. For several centuries there were separate Hittite groups, usually centered on various cities. But then strong rulers with their center in Hattusa (modern Boğazkale) succeeded in bringing these together and conquering large parts of central Anatolia to establish the Hittite kingdom.

== History ==
=== Early period ===
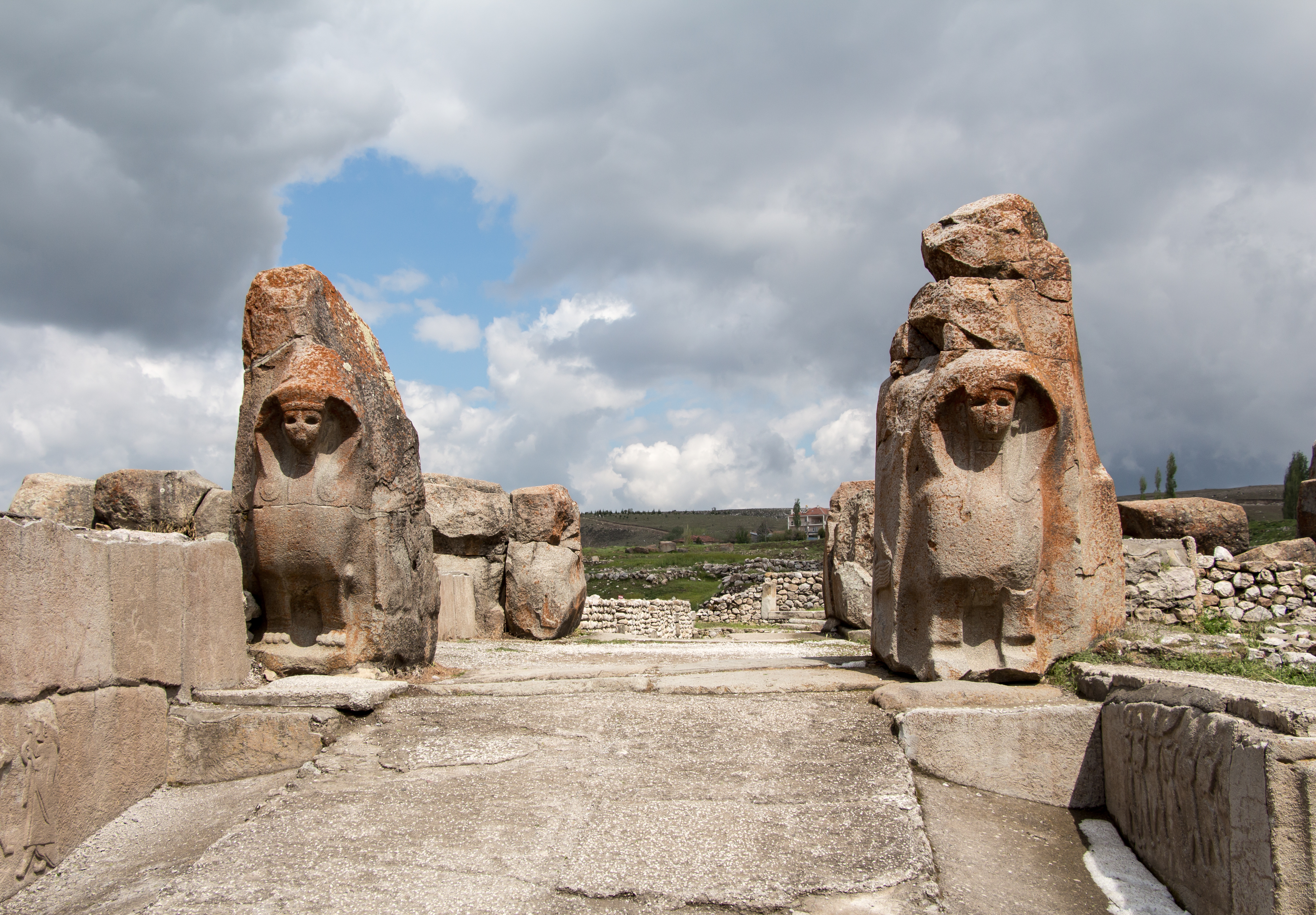
The Sphinx Gate (Alaca Höyük, Çorum, Turkey)

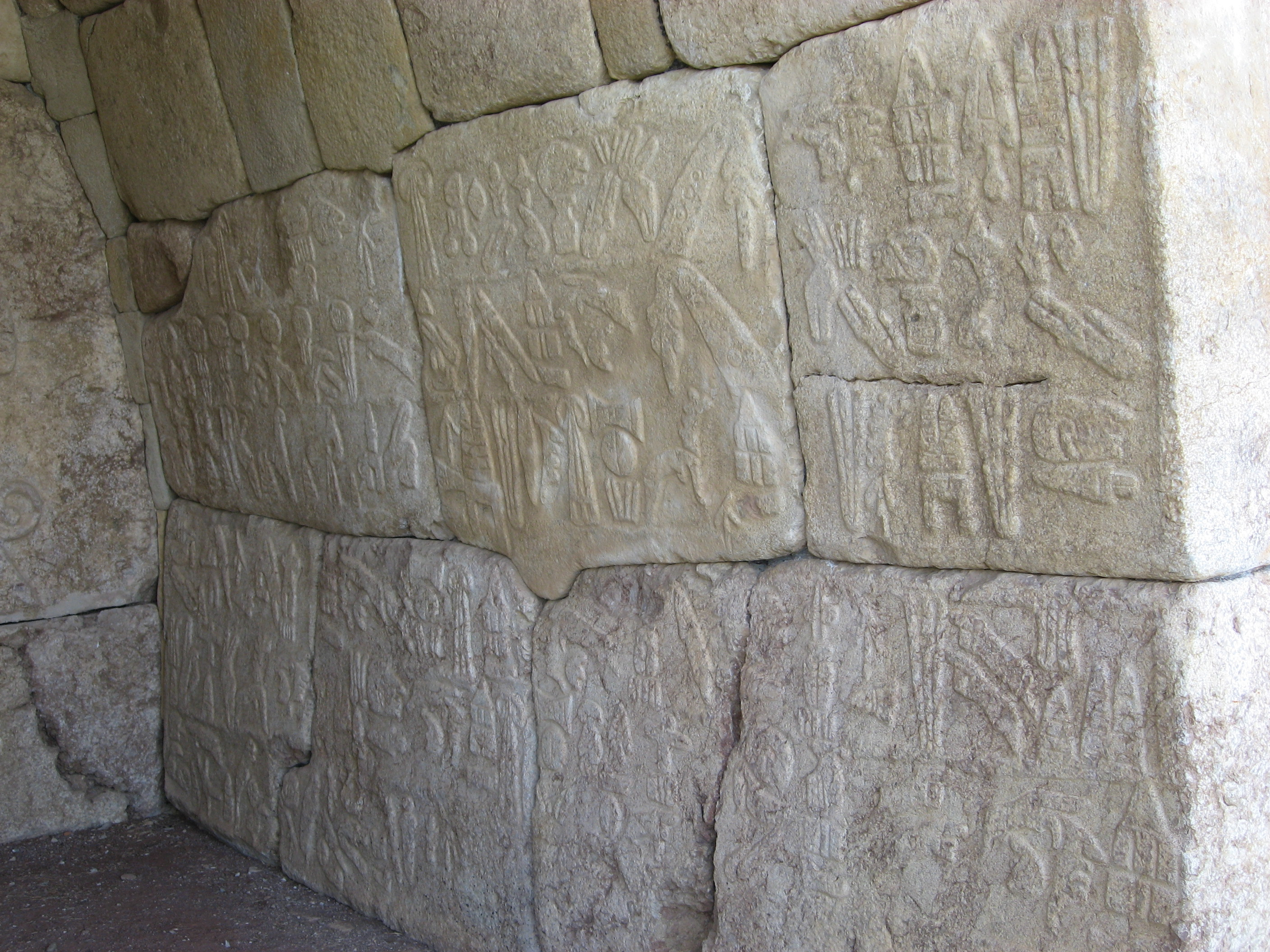
Reliefs and hieroglyphs from Chamber 2 at Hattusa built and decorated by Šuppiluliuma II, the last king of the Hittites

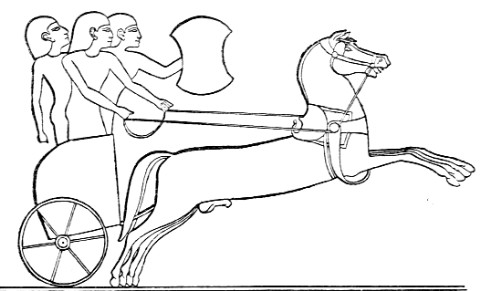
Hittite chariot, from an Egyptian relief

The Hittite state formed in the Middle Bronze Age (c. 1900–1650 BC) from small polities on the Kızılırmak River in north-central Anatolia. The early history of the Hittite kingdom is known through four "cushion-shaped" tablets, (classified as KBo 3.22, KBo 17.21+, KBo 22.1, and KBo 22.2), likely produced in Kussara, Nēša that may be dated to the 18th century BC. They are in Old Hittite; three of them using the Old Script". Most of the tablets are Akkadian copies dated to the 14th and 13th centuries BC. They reveal a rivalry within two branches of the royal family up to the Middle Kingdom: a northern branch based in Zalpuwa and Hattusa and a southern branch based in Kussara and Kanesh. The northerners have Hattian names; the southerners adopted Hittite and Luwian names.

Zalpuwa attacked Kanesh in 1833 BC. when an Old Assyrian kārum (merchant colony) flourished there.

One set of tablets, known collectively as the Anitta text, was likely propaganda for the southern branch of the royal family against the northern branch who had fixed on Hattusa as capital. They told of Pithana king of Kussara, who conquered neighbouring Neša (Kanesh), around 1750 BC, and of his son Anitta (r. 1745–1720 BC), who conquered northern cities including Hattusa and Zalpuwa. Another set, the "Tale of Zalpuwa", supports Zalpuwa and exonerates the later Ḫattušili I from the charge of sacking Kanesh.

Anitta was succeeded by Zuzzu (r. 1720–1710 BC); but sometime in 1710–1705 BC, Kanesh and its karum were destroyed, along with the Assyrian trading system with it. A Kussaran noble family survived to contest the Zalpuwan/Hattusan family, though whether these were of the direct line of Anitta is uncertain.

The ruling family of Zalpa maintained continuity during this time. Huzziya I took over Hatti. His son-in-law Labarna I, a southerner from Hurma, usurped the throne and adopted Huzziya's grandson Ḫattušili as his own son and heir.

=== Old Kingdom ===
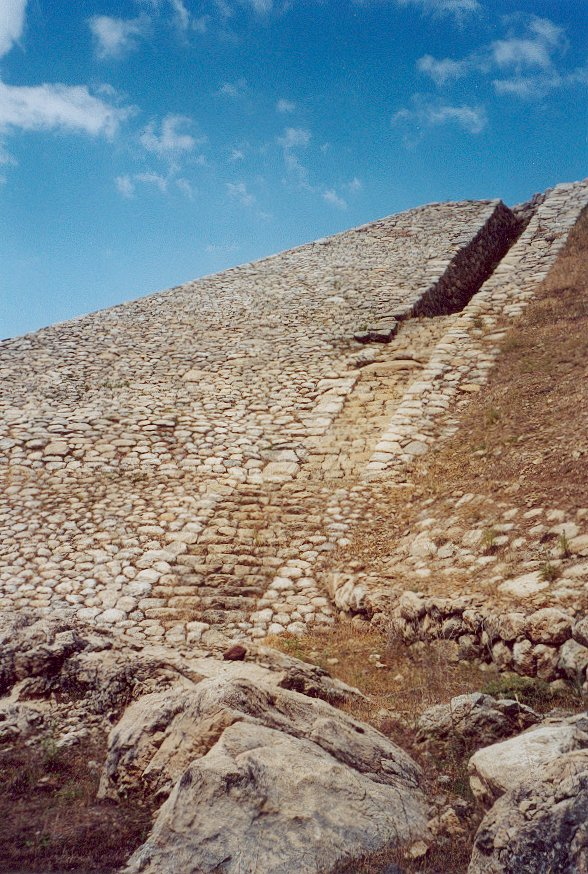
Hattusa ramp

The founding of the Hittite Kingdom is attributed to either Labarna I or Hattusili I (the latter might also have had Labarna as a personal name), who conquered the area south and north of Hattusa. Hattusili I campaigned as far as the Semitic Amorite kingdom of Yamkhad in Syria, where he attacked, but did not capture, its capital of Aleppo. Hattusili I did eventually capture Hattusa and was credited for the foundation of the Hittite Empire. Hattusili I chose his grandson Mursili I as his successor.

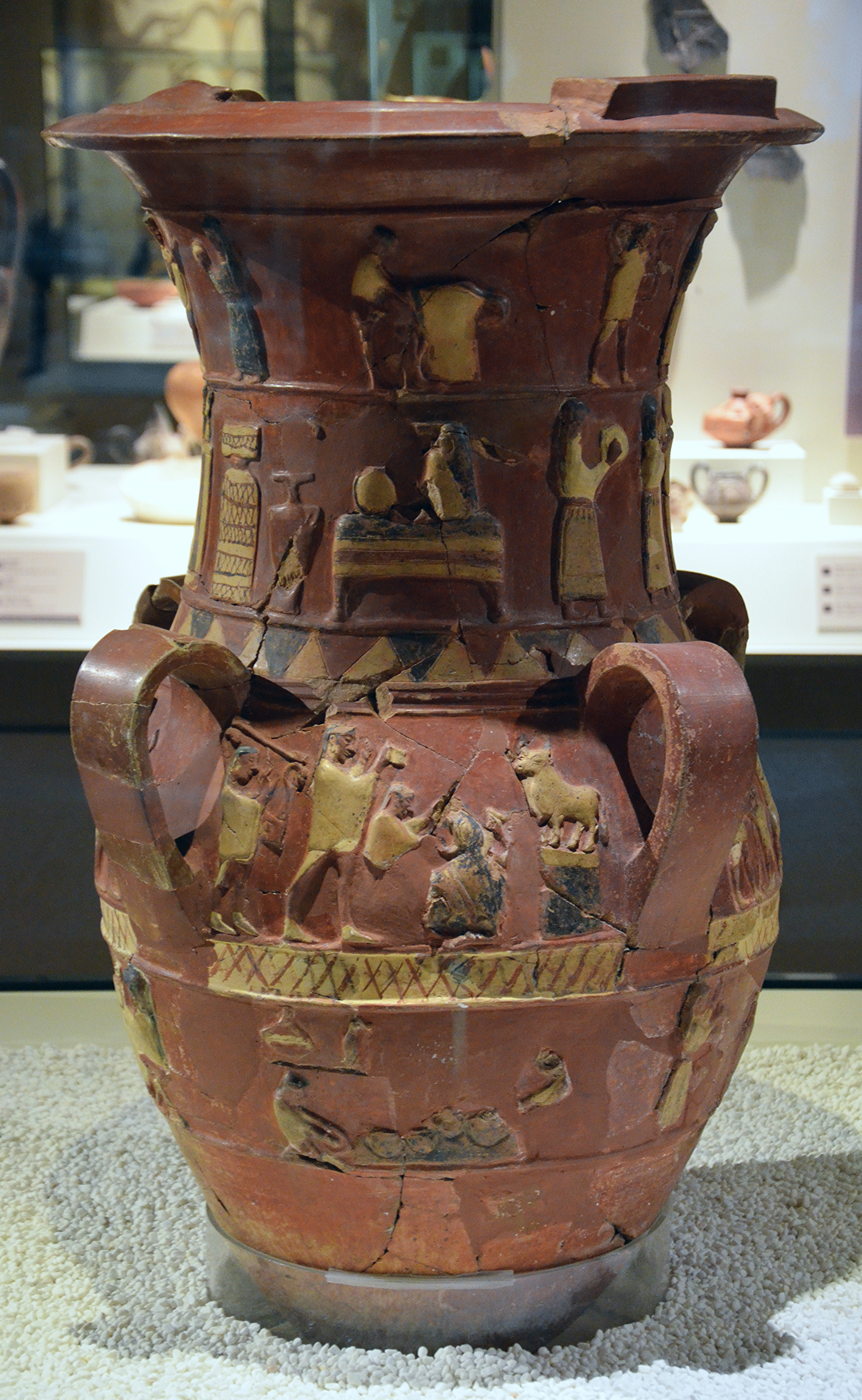
The İnandık vase, also known as a Hüseyindede vase, a large, four-handled Hittite terracotta vase with scenes in relief depicting a sacred wedding ceremony, mid 17th century BC, İnandıktepe, Museum of Anatolian Civilizations, Ankara

Mursili continued the conquests of Hattusili I. In 1595 BC (middle chronology) or 1587 BC (low middle chronology), Mursili I conducted a major raid down the Euphrates River, bypassing Assyria and sacking Aleppo and Babylon, ejecting the Amorite rulers of the Old Babylonian Empire in the process. Rather than incorporate Babylonia into Hittite domains, Mursili seems to have instead turned control of Babylonia over to his Kassite allies, who were to rule it for the next four centuries. Due to fear of revolts at home, he did not remain in Babylon for long. This lengthy campaign strained the resources of Hatti, and left the capital in a state of near-anarchy. Mursili was assassinated by his brother-in-law Hantili I during his journey back to Hattusa or shortly after his return home, and the Hittite Kingdom was plunged into chaos. Hantili took the throne. He was able to escape multiple murder attempts; his wife, Harapsili and her son were murdered. Other members of the royal family were killed by Zidanta I, who was then murdered by his own son, Ammuna.

All of the internal unrest among the Hittite royal family led to a decline of power. The Hurrians, a people living in the mountainous region along the upper Tigris and Euphrates rivers in modern southeast Turkey, took advantage of the situation to seize Aleppo and the coastal region of Adaniya, renaming it Kizzuwatna (later Cilicia). For the remainder of the 16th century, Hittite expansion was curtailed both by dynastic quarrels and continuous warfare with the Hurrians, who became the dominant power in Anatolia.

Telepinu (c. 1500 BC) won victories to the southwest, apparently by allying himself with Kizzuwatna against a rival Hurrian state. He also attempted to stabilize succession.

=== Middle Kingdom ===
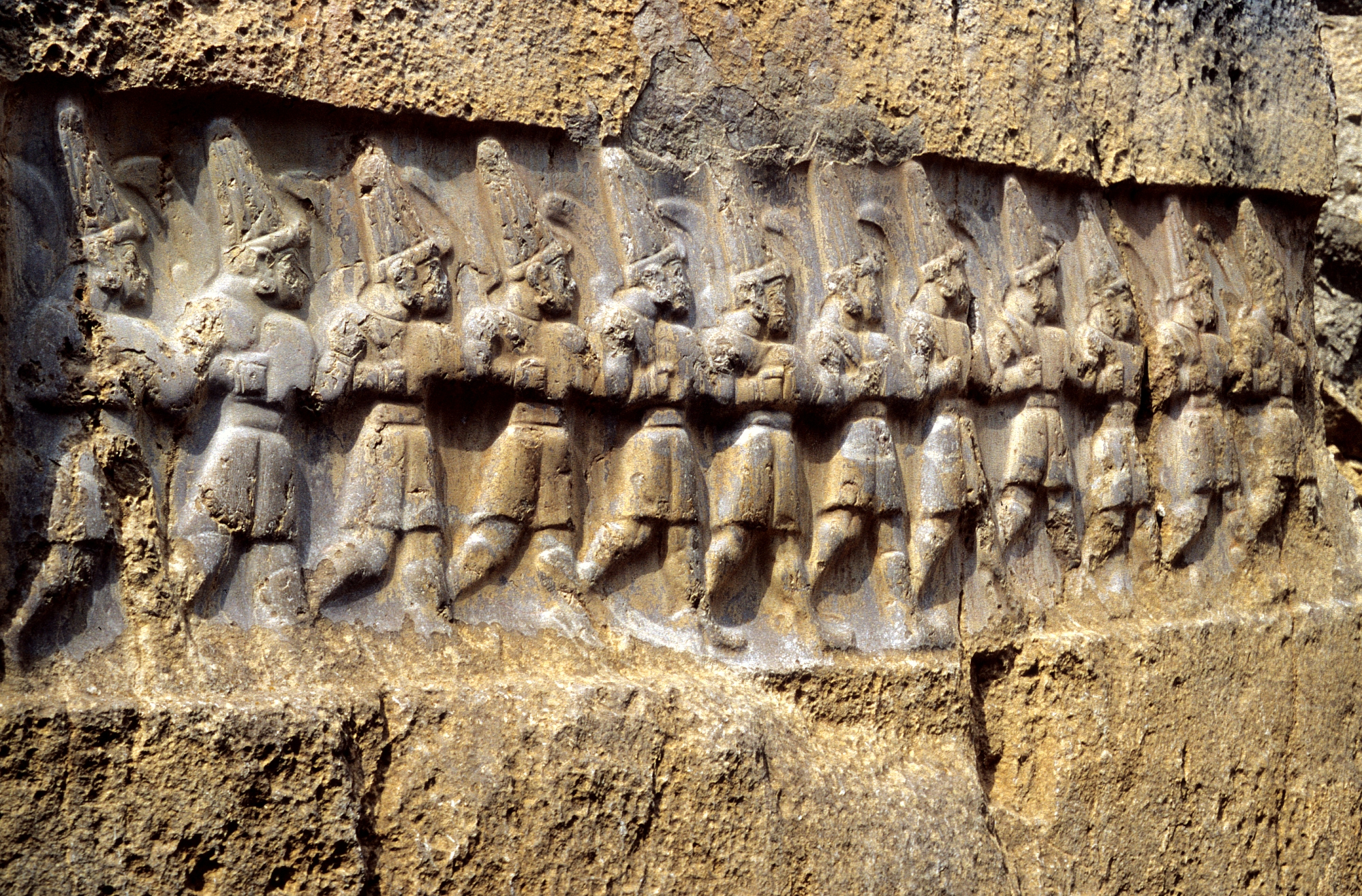
Twelve Hittite gods of the Underworld in the nearby Yazılıkaya, a sanctuary of Hattusa

Telepinu's reign marked the end of the "Old Kingdom" and the beginning of the lengthy weak phase known as the "Middle Kingdom". The period of the 15th century BC is largely unknown with few surviving records. The Hittites were under constant attack during this period, mainly from the Kaskians, a non-Indo-European people settled along the shores of the Black Sea. The capital was moved first to Sapinuwa and then to Samuha.

=== New Kingdom ===
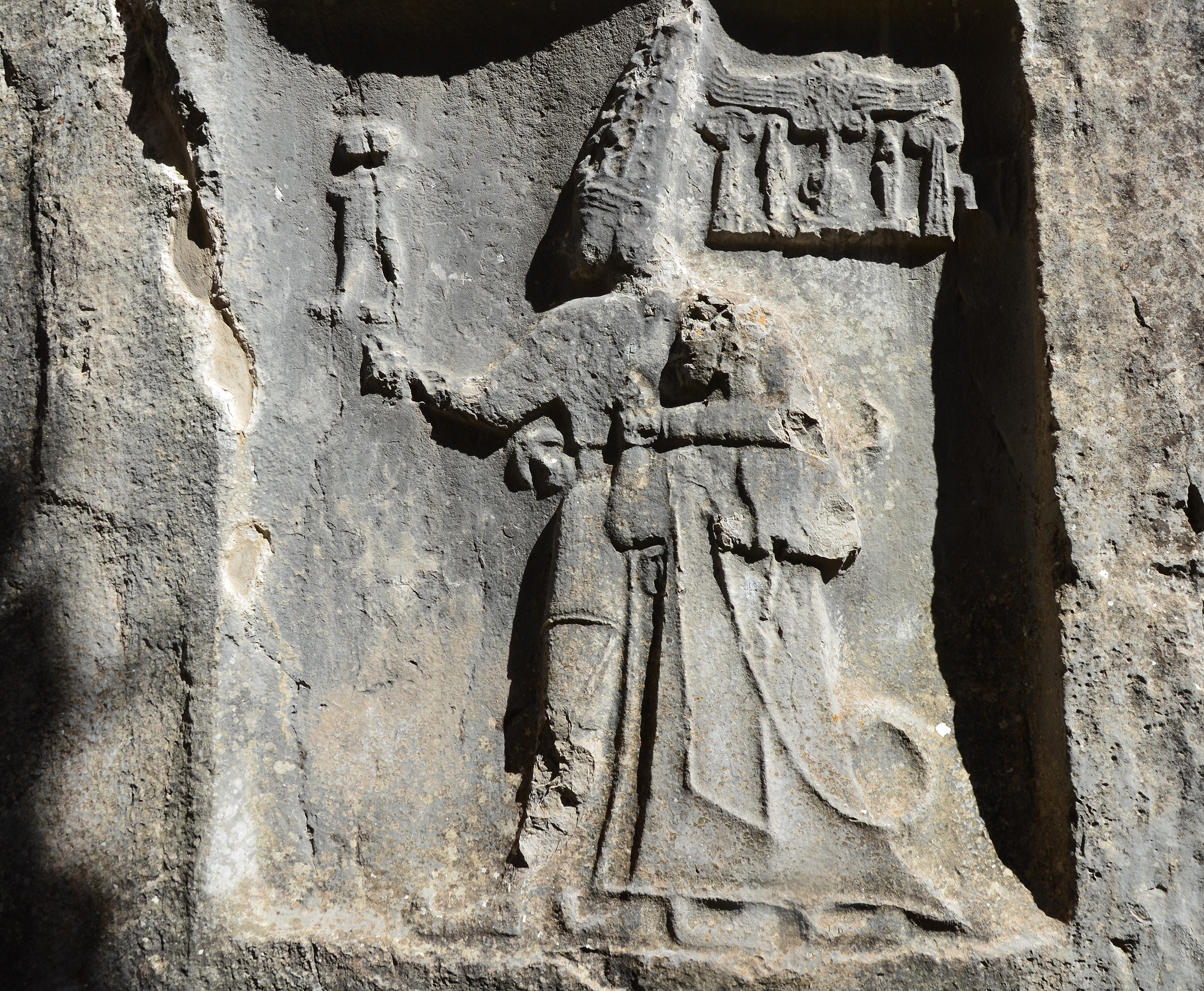
Tudhaliya IV (relief in Hattusa)

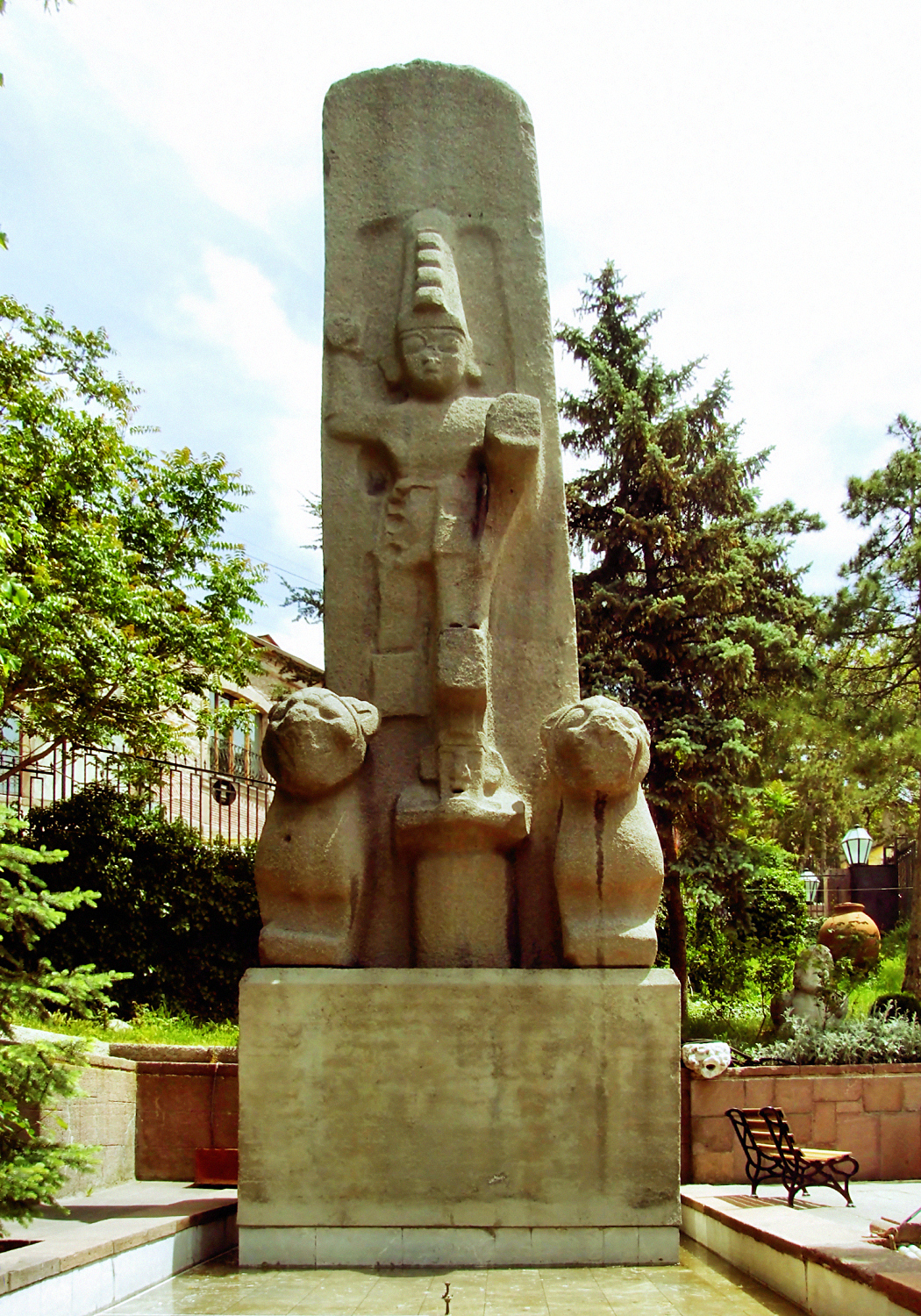
Exact replica of a Hittite monument from Fasıllar, c. 1300 BC (Museum of Anatolian Civilizations)

With the reign of Tudhaliya I, Hittite Kingdom entered the "Hittite Empire period". Hittite people tended to settle in the older lands of south Anatolia rather than the lands of the Aegean. As this settlement progressed, treaties were signed with neighboring peoples. During the Hittite Empire period the kingship became hereditary and the king took on a "superhuman aura" and began to be referred to by the Hittite citizens as "My Sun". The kings of the Empire period began acting as a high priest for the whole kingdom – making an annual tour of the Hittite holy cities, conducting festivals and supervising the upkeep of the sanctuaries.

Following Tudhaliya I, the Hittite Wars of Survival resulted in the destruction of Hattusa. The kingdom recovered under Šuppiluliuma I (c. 1350 BC), who re-conquered Aleppo. Mitanni was reduced to vassalage by the Assyrians under his son-in-law, and he defeated Carchemish, another Amorite city-state. With his own sons placed over all of these new conquests and Babylonia still in the hands of the allied Kassites, this made Šuppiluliuma a major power broker alongside the rulers of Assyria and Egypt, and Egypt sought an alliance by marriage of one of Šuppiluliuma's sons with the widow of Tutankhamen. That son was evidently murdered before reaching his destination and the alliance was never consummated. The Middle Assyrian Empire (1365–1050 BC) once more began to grow in power with the ascension of Ashur-uballit I in 1365 BC. Ashur-uballit I defeated Mattiwaza the Mitanni king. The lands of the Mitanni and Hurrians were appropriated by Assyria, enabling it to encroach on Hittite territory in eastern Asia Minor, and Adad-nirari I annexed Carchemish and northeast Syria from the control of the Hittites.

While Šuppiluliuma I reigned, the Hittite Empire was devastated by an epidemic of tularemia. The epidemic afflicted the Hittites for decades and tularemia killed Šuppiluliuma I and his successor, Arnuwanda II. After Šuppiluliuma I's rule, and the brief reign of his eldest son, Arnuwanda II, another son, Mursili II, became king (c. 1330 BC). Having inherited a position of strength in the east, Mursili attacked Arzawa. At a point when the Hittites were weakened by the tularemia epidemic, the Arzawans attacked the Hittites, who repelled the attack by sending infected rams to the Arzawans. This was the first recorded use of biological warfare. Mursili also attacked a city known as Millawanda (Miletus), which was under the control of Ahhiyawa, identified as all or part of Mycenaean Greece.

==== Battle of Kadesh ====
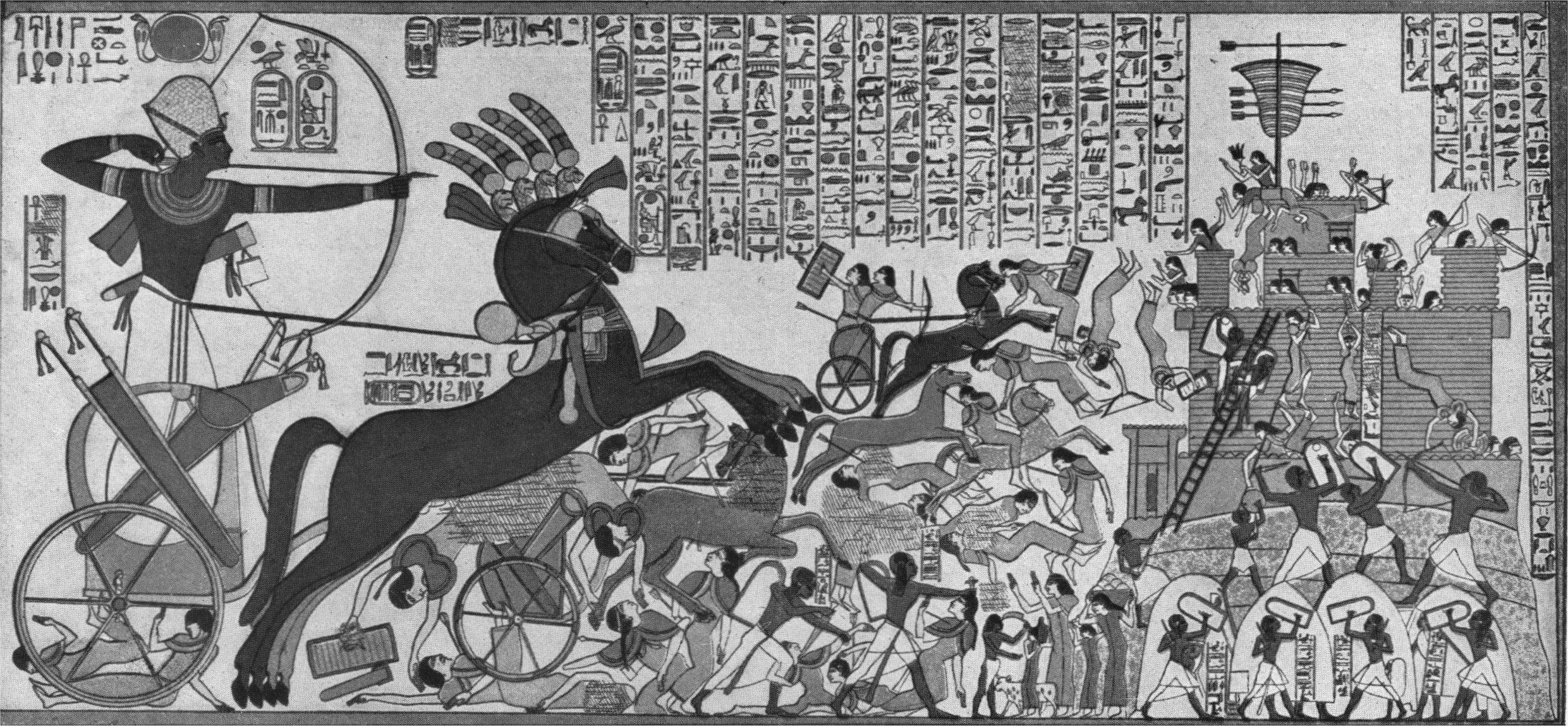
Egyptian pharaoh Ramesses II storming the Hittite fortress of Dapur

Hittite prosperity was mostly dependent on control of the trade routes and metal sources. Because of the importance of Northern Syria to the vital routes linking the Cilician gates with Mesopotamia, defense of this area was crucial, and threatened by Egyptian expansion under Pharaoh Ramesses II. The outcome of the Battle of Kadesh is uncertain, though it seems that the timely arrival of Egyptian reinforcements prevented total Hittite victory. The Egyptians forced the Hittites to take refuge in the fortress of Kadesh, but their own losses prevented them from sustaining a siege. This battle took place in the 5th year of Ramesses (c. 1274 BC by the most commonly used chronology).

==== Decline and fall ====
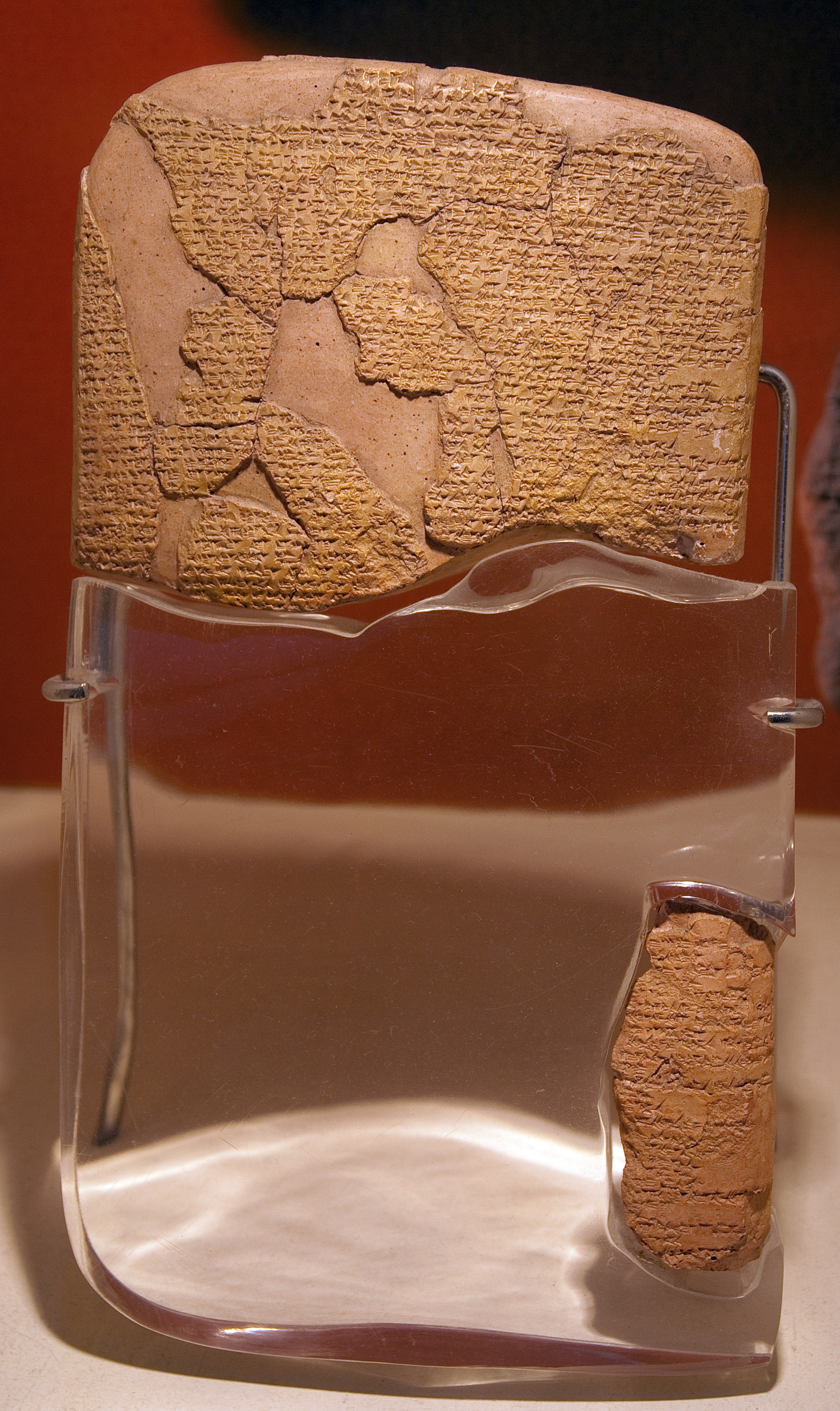
Egypto-Hittite Peace Treaty (c. 1258 BC) between Hattusili III and Ramesses II, the earliest known surviving peace treaty, sometimes called the Treaty of Kadesh after the Battle of Kadesh (Istanbul Archaeology Museum).

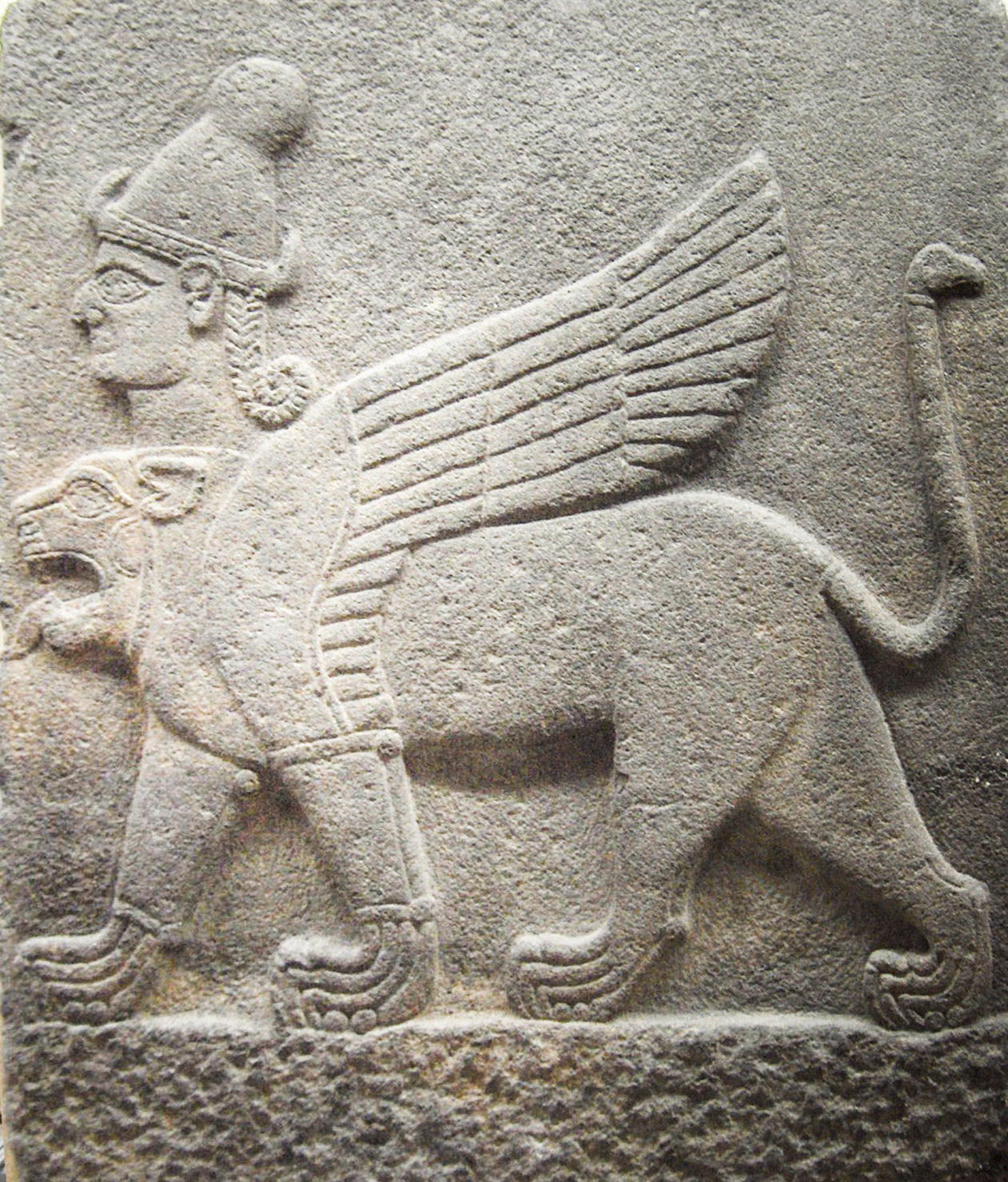
Chimera with a human head and a lion's body; Late Hittite period in Museum of Anatolian Civilizations, Ankara

After this date, the power of both the Hittites and Egyptians began to decline yet again because of the power of the Assyrians. The Assyrian king Shalmaneser I had seized the opportunity to vanquish Hurria and Mitanni, occupy their lands, and expand up to the head of the Euphrates, while Muwatalli was preoccupied with the Egyptians. The Hittites had vainly tried to preserve the Mitanni Kingdom with military support. Assyria now posed just as great a threat to Hittite trade routes as Egypt ever had. Muwatalli's son, Urhi-Teshub, took the throne and ruled as king for seven years as Mursili III before being ousted by his uncle, Hattusili III after a brief civil war. In response to increasing Assyrian annexation of Hittite territory, he concluded a peace and alliance with Ramesses II (also fearful of Assyria), presenting his daughter's hand in marriage to the Pharaoh. The Treaty of Kadesh, one of the oldest completely surviving treaties in history, fixed their mutual boundaries in southern Canaan, and was signed in the 21st year of Rameses (c. 1258 BC). Terms of this treaty included the marriage of one of the Hittite princesses to Ramesses.

Hattusili's son, Tudhaliya IV, was the last strong Hittite king able to keep the Assyrians out of the Hittite heartland to some degree at least, though he too lost much territory to them, and was badly defeated by Tukulti-Ninurta I of Assyria in the Battle of Nihriya. He even temporarily annexed the island of Cyprus, probably with naval assistance from Ugarit. To conquer Cyprus, a port would have been required in order to assemble the necessary fleet of ships. Tudhaliya IV had an ally in Ugarit, a small seagoing vassal state (destroyed c. 1185 BC) in what is today Syria. Information about the campaign appears on a tablet from the reign of his son Suppiluliuma II. Tablet translated:

“I seized the king of Alasiya with his wives, his children, [and his]. All the goods, including silver and gold, and all the captured people I removed and brought home to Hattusa. I enslaved the country of Alasiya, and made it tributary on the spot. (KUB xii 38 i, 3–8, after Güterbock (1967a: 77))”

Tudhaliya IV reigned c. 1245–1215 BC.

Ahhiyawa (Mycenean) and the Hittites fought over Alashiya since at least the reign of Arnuwanda I (c. 1390–1380/1370 BC). There was then a crisis involving a rebellious Hittite vassal Madduwatta who repeatedly raided Cyprus. Arnuwanda wrote to him and Madduwatta's reply was this:

“The Land of Alasiya is a Land of My Sun (wrote Arnuwanda) and brings him tribute. Why have you taken it?’ But Madduwatta spoke thus: ‘When Attar(i)ssiya and the Man of Piggaya were raiding the Land of Alasiya, I often raided it too. But the father of My Sun did not subsequently write to me, the father of My Sun never signified to me: ‘The Land of Alasiya is mine. Acknowledge it as this!’ If now My Sun demands back the prisoners taken from Alasiya, I will give them back to him. (Indictment §36, rev. 85–9)”

The last Hittite king, Šuppiluliuma II, won a naval battle against Alashiya off the coast of Cyprus.But the Assyrians, under Ashur-resh-ishi I had by this time annexed much Hittite territory in Asia Minor and Syria, driving out and defeating the Babylonian king Nebuchadnezzar I in the process, who also had eyes on Hittite lands.

Suppiluliuma II's reign began in c. 1207 BC and ended coinciding with the collapse of the Hittite Empire.

Casualties from war became ever more costly and unsustainable.

=== Late Bronze Age collapse ===
During the Late Bronze Age collapse, the Sea Peoples contributed to widespread instability in the eastern Mediterranean, affecting regions including Cilicia, Cyprus and Canaan. The resulting disruption of regional political and trade networks coincided with the decline of the Hittite Empire. Its capital, Hattusa, was gradually abandoned around 1190 BC, with archaeological evidence suggesting that the royal administration and elites had departed before parts of the city were destroyed by fire. Although invasions by the Kaskians, Phrygians and Bryges have traditionally been proposed as explanations for Hattusa's destruction, there is no conclusive evidence that these groups jointly attacked the city. The precise circumstances of its abandonment and destruction remain uncertain. The Hittite Kingdom thus vanished from historical records, much of the territory being seized by Assyria. Alongside these attacks, many internal issues also led to the end of the Hittite Kingdom. The end of the kingdom was part of the larger Bronze Age Collapse. A study of tree rings of juniper trees growing in the region showed a change to drier conditions from the 13th century BC into the 12th century BC with drought for three consecutive years in 1198, 1197 and 1196 BC.

=== Post-Hittite period ===
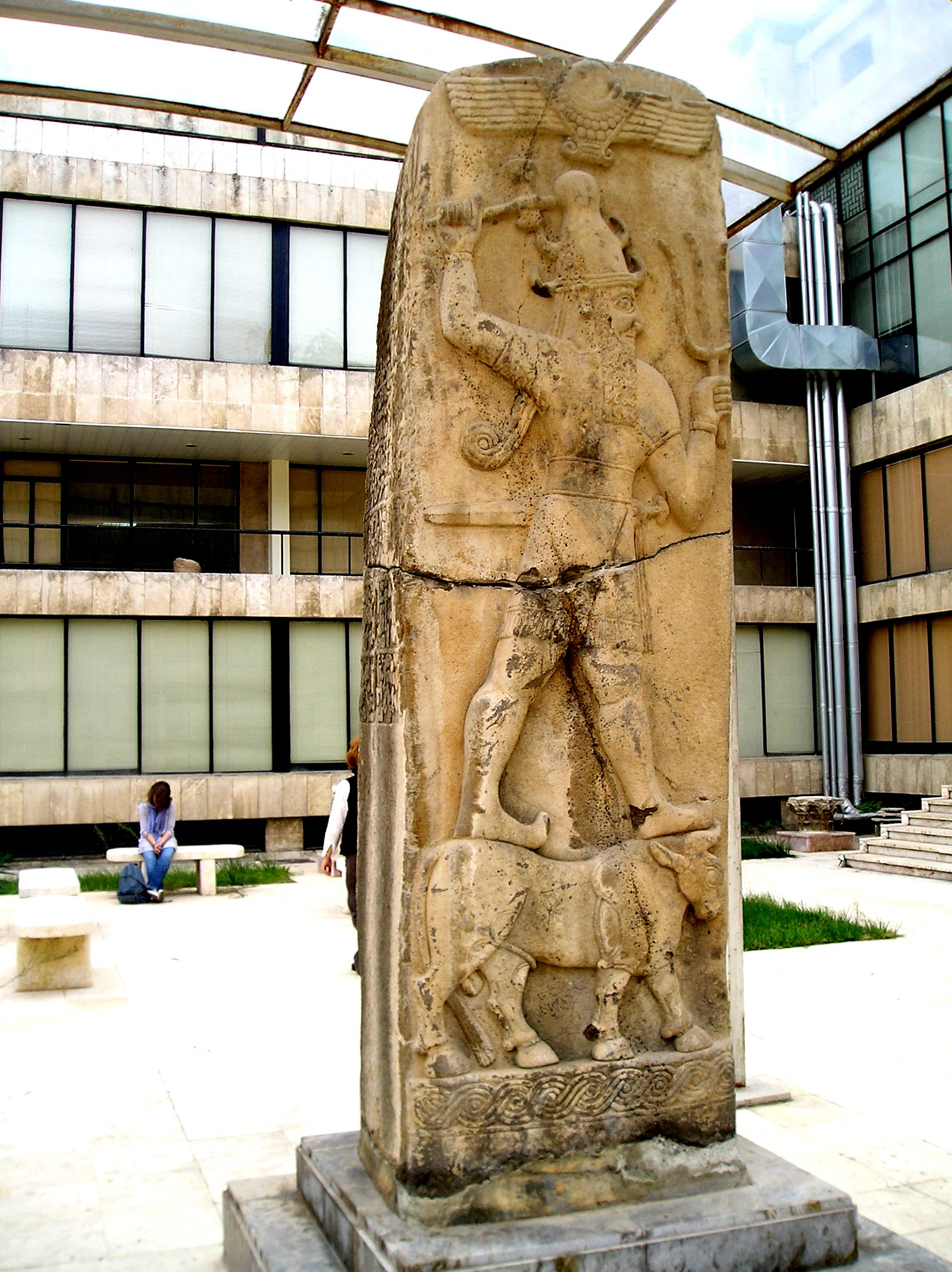
Luwian storm god Tarḫunz in the National Museum of Aleppo

Although the capital of Hattuša is recognized as having been abandoned around 1190 BCE, this abandonment was not absolute. For decades before this, since the reign of Muwatalli II, the population of the city had been in decline. The evacuation concerned mainly the officialdom, with a modest native population remaining in Hattuša until the 10th century BCE. Red-painted ceramic ware was introduced into the area, often associated with the Kaška. Two decades later, changes west around Gordion after the capital's abandonment saw the end of the wheel-made ceramics at the end of the 10th century. Eventually the Phrygians would take over. A rump state could have survived in the modern Karaman Province.

By 1160 BC, the political situation in Asia Minor looked vastly different from that of only 25 years earlier. In that year, the Assyrian king Tiglath-Pileser I was defeating the Mushki (Phrygians) who had been attempting to press into Assyrian colonies in southern Anatolia from the Anatolian highlands, and the Kaska people, the Hittites' old enemies from the northern hill-country between Hatti and the Black Sea, seem to have joined them soon after. The Phrygians had apparently overrun Cappadocia from the West, with recently discovered epigraphic evidence confirming their origins as the Balkan "Bryges" tribe, forced out by the Macedonians.

Although the Hittite Kingdom disappeared from Anatolia at this point, there emerged a number of "Neo-Hittite states" in Anatolia and northern Syria. In the aftermath of the collapse of Hattuša, Karkemiš under Kuzi-Teššub expanded the city and claimed the title "Great King. These states gradually fell under the control of the Neo-Assyrian Empire (911–608 BC). Carchemish and Melid were made vassals of Assyria under Shalmaneser III (858–823 BC), and fully incorporated into Assyria during the reign of Sargon II (722–705 BC).

A large and powerful state known as Tabal occupied much of southern Anatolia. Known as Greek Tibarenoi (Ancient Greek: Τιβαρηνοί), Latin Tibareni, Thobeles in Josephus, their language may have been Luwian, attested by monuments written using Anatolian hieroglyphs. This state too was conquered and incorporated into the vast Neo-Assyrian Empire.

== Government ==
The head of the Hittite state was the king, followed by the heir-apparent. The king was the sole ruler and supreme military commander, judicial authority, and high priest. Some officials were granted more autonomy, most importantly the gal mesedi (chief of the royal bodyguards). Another important position was gal gestin (chief of the wine stewards), who, like the gal mesedi, was generally a member of the royal family. The kingdom's bureaucracy was headed by the gal dubsar (chief of the scribes).

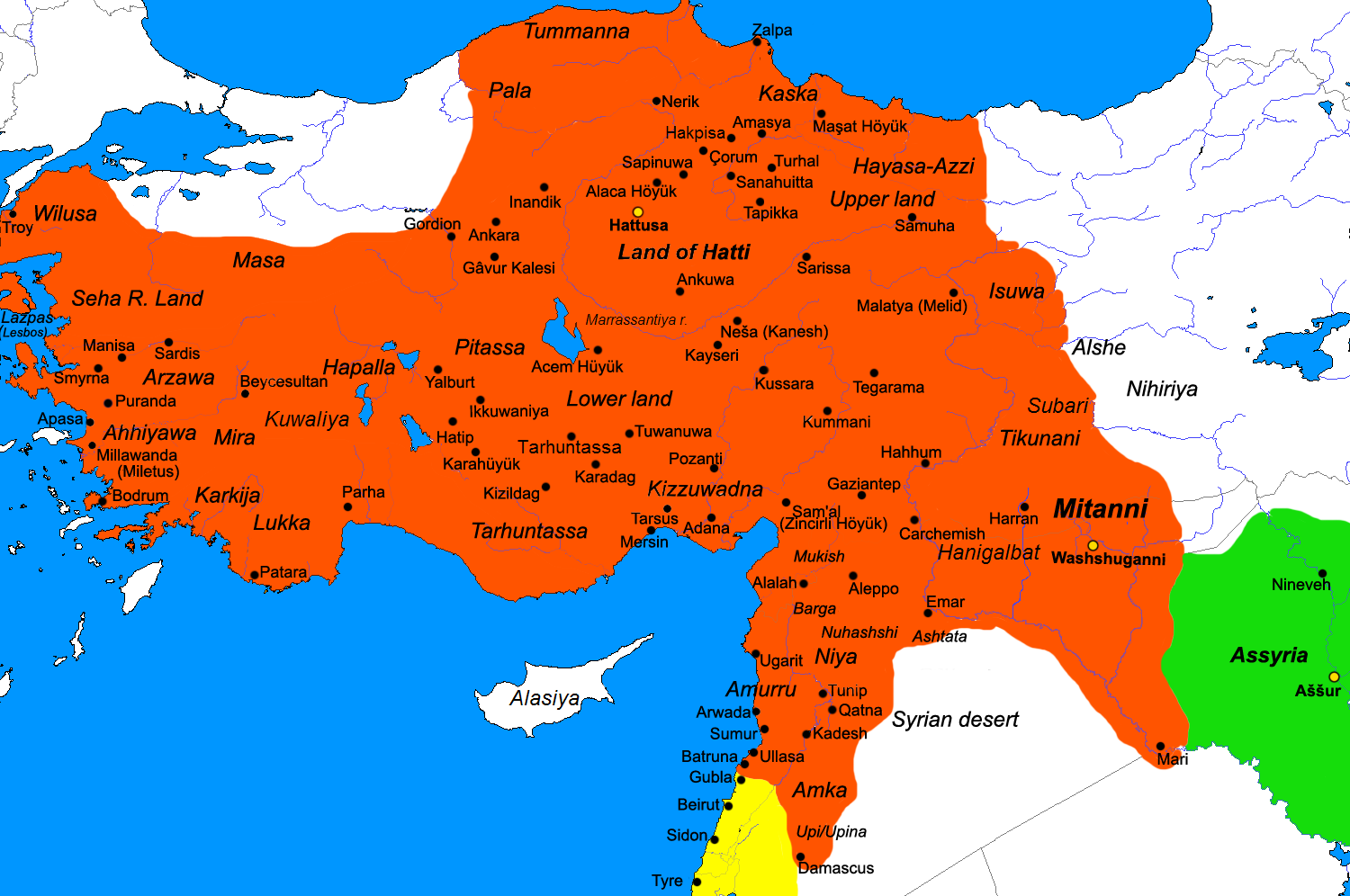
Map of the Hittite Empire at its greatest extent under Suppiluliuma I (c.1350–1322) and Mursili II (c.1321–1295).

=== Foreign policy and wars ===
The Hittites frequently took captives as slaves, who were important sources of labor in food production and population replacement. They may have had a non-aggression pact with the Ahhiyawa (possibly Achaeans), having taken then traded back Millawanda in negotiations. Hittites had a military and economic rivalry with Egypt, culminating in the Battle of Kadesh. Hittite queens could be influential in foreign policy, often through marriage alliances; Puduḫepa is one notable example. Modern historians count the Hittites as one of "club of great powers" of the Bronze Age. Hittite clashes with Assyria included the 13th century Battle of Nihriya. The Battles of Alashiya (1275–1205) were fought against polities on Cyprus.

Egyptian emissaries were received at Kadesh on the Orontes River and Carchemish on the River Euphrates in southern Anatolia.

Hatti maintained an alliance with Egypt after the Egyptian–Hittite peace treaty. Hatti's northern and eastern frontiers were often unstable as evidenced by the Battle of Ganuvara and the Hittite Wars of Survival.

=== The Pankuš ===
King Telipinu (reigned c. 1525 – c. 1500 BC) is considered to be the last king of the Old Kingdom of the Hittites. He seized power during a dynastic power struggle. To regulate royal succession, issued the Edict of Telipinus, creating a body called the Pankuš as a high court.

Murder and theft were not capital crimes under the Hittite law code. Most criminal penalties involved restitution.

== Economy ==
=== Agriculture and husbandry ===
The Hittite economy was largely agropastoral. Barley (Hittite ḫalki) and various wheat cultivars (ZÍZ-tar) were the main types of grain. Grain silos where usually placed in administrative centers such as Hattusa. Livestock included cattle, sheep, goats, horses, mules, and donkeys, and, to a lesser extent, pigs.

In theory the land was owned by the gods, while in practice the king controlled the best lands. Land could be granted by the king to individuals in exchange for military service. Food production was critical to the economy and wars taking workers away would impact the food supply.

=== Metallurgy ===
Scholars once attributed the development of iron-smelting to the Hittites, who were thought to have monopolized ironworking during the Bronze Age. This theory has been increasingly contested in the 21st century in favor of a gradual spread of ironworking technology across the region from just before the Late Bronze Age Collapse into the Iron Age. The number of iron objects recovered from Bronze Age Anatolia is comparable to that of other major polities including Egypt and Mesopotamia; only a small number of these objects are weapons. X-ray fluorescence spectrometry suggests that most or all irons from the Bronze Age are derived from meteorites.

=== Currency ===
Hittite currency was measured as shekels, minas and talents. A male laborer could earn one silver shekel per month and a woman half a shekel. Laborers could also be paid in kind with a part of the harvest.

== Population ==
Hattuša's population during the reign of Hattusili III (c. 1275–1245 BC) has been estimated at 2,300–4,600. The total population of the kingdom at its greatest may have been 200,000. Hatti was able to muster 100,000 for military service. Military campaigns that were costly in lives resulted in difficulties maintaining Hittite food production and economy. Captives were taken as slaves to maintain the Hittite labor force.

== Language ==
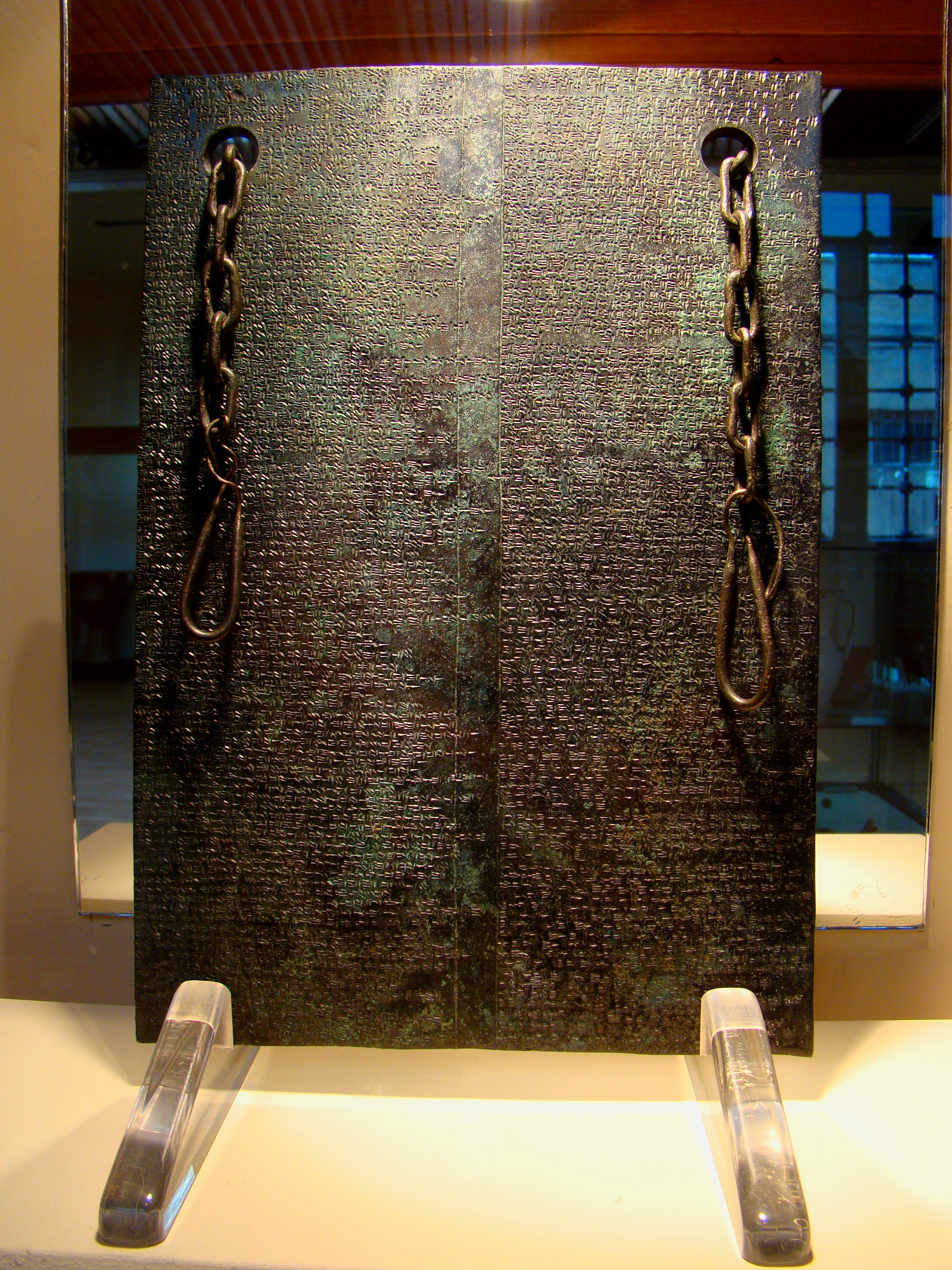
Bronze tablet from Çorum-Boğazköy dating from 1235 BC, photographed at Museum of Anatolian Civilizations, Ankara

Indo-European family tree in order of first attestation. Hittite belongs to the family of Anatolian languages and the oldest written Indo-European language.

The Hittite language is recorded fragmentarily from about the 19th century BC (in the Kültepe texts, see Ishara). It remained in use until about 1100 BC. Hittite is the best attested member of the Anatolian branch of the Indo-European language family, and the Indo-European language for which the earliest surviving written attestation exists, with isolated Hittite loanwords and numerous personal names appearing in an Old Assyrian context from as early as the 20th century BC.

The language of the Hattusa tablets was eventually deciphered by a Czech linguist, Bedřich Hrozný (1879–1952), who, on 24 November 1915, announced his results in a lecture at the Near Eastern Society of Berlin. His book about the discovery was printed in Leipzig in 1917, under the title The Language of the Hittites; Its Structure and Its Membership in the Indo-European Linguistic Family. The preface of the book begins with:

The present work undertakes to establish the nature and structure of the hitherto mysterious language of the Hittites, and to decipher this language [...] It will be shown that Hittite is in the main an Indo-European language.

The decipherment famously led to the confirmation of the laryngeal theory in Indo-European linguistics, which had been predicted several decades before. Due to its marked differences in its structure and phonology, some early philologists, most notably Warren Cowgill, had even argued that it should be classified as a sister language to Indo-European languages (Indo-Hittite), rather than a daughter language. By the end of the Hittite Empire, the Hittite language had become a written language of administration and diplomatic correspondence. The population of most of the Hittite Empire by this time spoke Luwian, another Indo-European language of the Anatolian family that had originated to the west of the Hittite region.

According to Craig Melchert, the current tendency is to suppose that Proto-Indo-European evolved, and that the "prehistoric speakers" of Anatolian became isolated "from the rest of the PIE speech community, so as not to share in some common innovations." Hittite, as well as its Anatolian cousins, split off from Proto-Indo-European at an early stage, thereby preserving archaisms that were later lost in the other Indo-European languages.

In Hittite there are many loanwords, particularly religious vocabulary, from the non-Indo-European Hurrian and Hattic languages. The latter was the language of the Hattians, the local inhabitants of the land of Hatti before being absorbed or displaced by the Hittites. Sacred and magical texts from Hattusa were often written in Hattic, Hurrian, and Luwian, even after Hittite became the norm for other writings.

The Hittites called their language nešili, "the language of Nesa". The history of the Hittite civilization is known primarily from textual evidence in the form of cuneiform writing on clay tablets recovered from sites within Hittite territory and from Assyria, Babylonia, Egypt and the broader Middle East; many of the texts found outside Hittite territory are diplomatic and commercial correspondence recovered from archival stores. The discovery of the Hittite language and its deciphering was a seminal event in Indo-European studies.

== Art and architecture ==
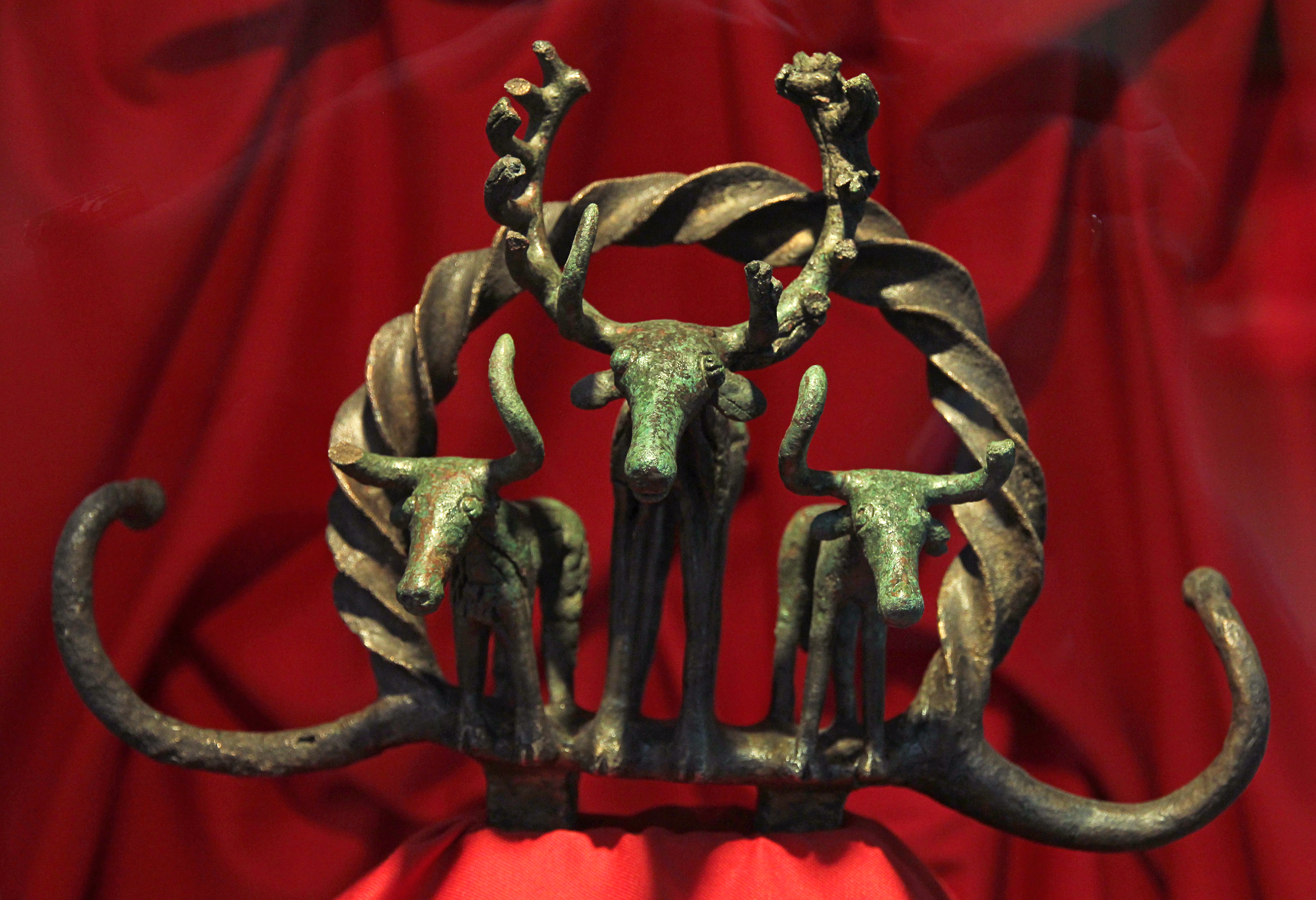
Bronze Hittite figures of animals (Museum of Anatolian Civilizations)

There are relatively few remains of Hittite art. Those that remain include some impressive monumental carvings, a number of rock reliefs, as well as metalwork, in particular the Alaca Höyük bronze standards, carved ivory, and ceramics, including the Hüseyindede vases. The Sphinx Gates of Alaca Höyük and Hattusa, with the monument at the spring of Eflatun Pınar, are among the largest constructed sculptures, along with a number of large recumbent lions, of which the Lion of Babylon statue at Babylon is the largest, if it is indeed Hittite. Nearly all are notably worn. Rock reliefs include the Hanyeri relief, and Hemite relief. The Niğde Stele from the end of the 8th century BC is a Luwian monument, from the Post-Hittite period, found in the modern Turkish city of Niğde.

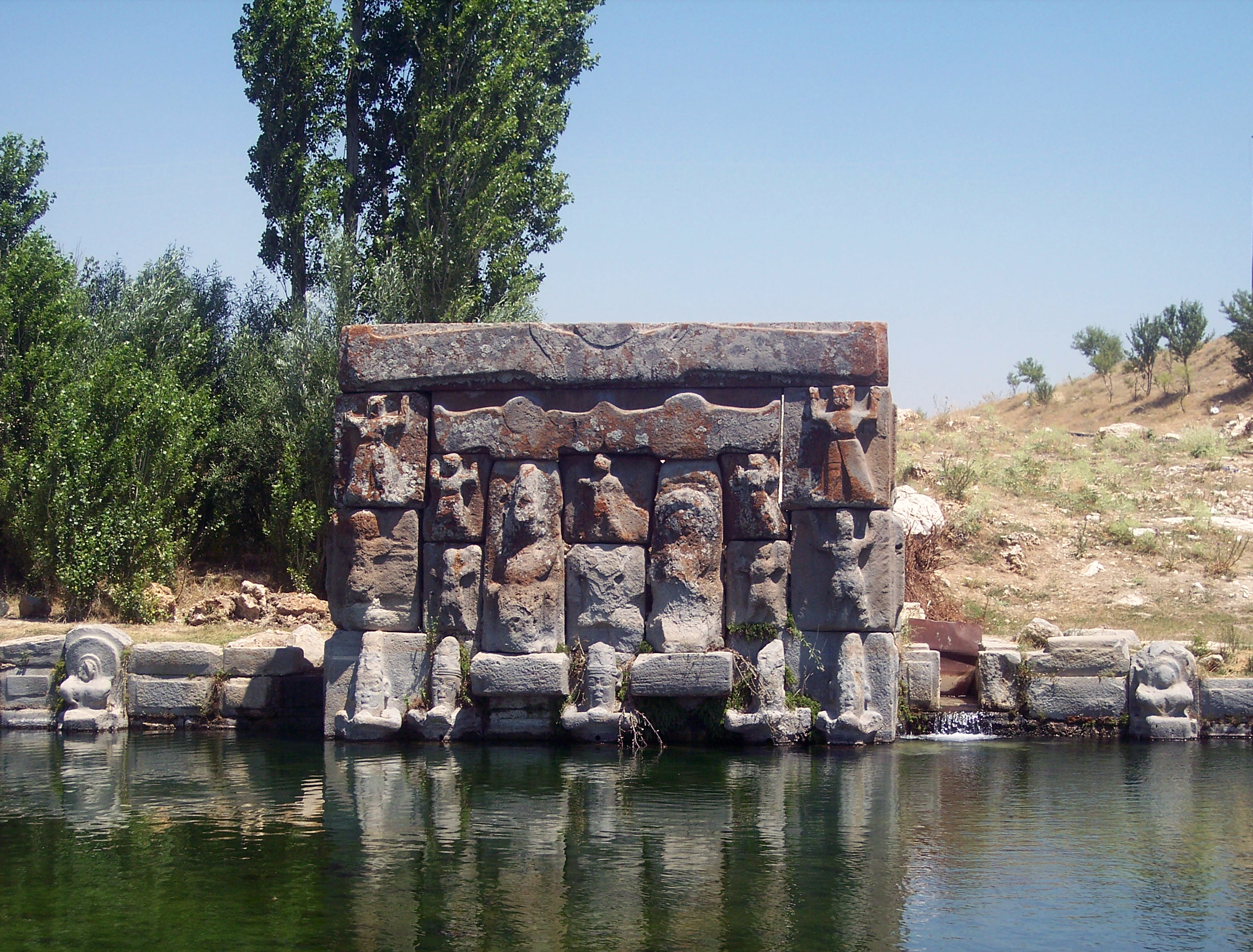
Monument over a spring at Eflatun Pınar

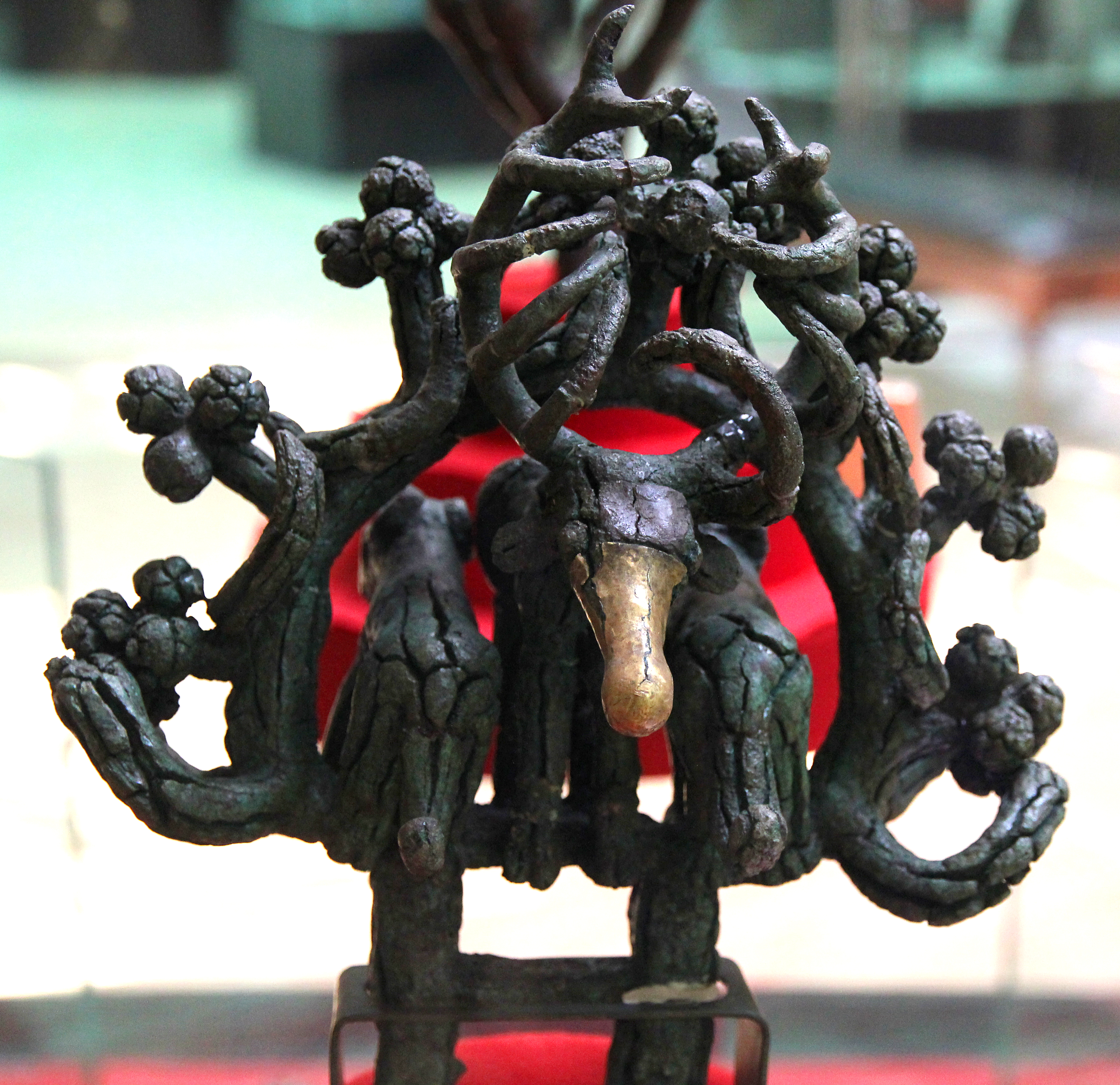
Alaca Höyük bronze standard deer with gold nose and two lions/panthers (Museum of Anatolian Civilizations)

== Religion and mythology ==
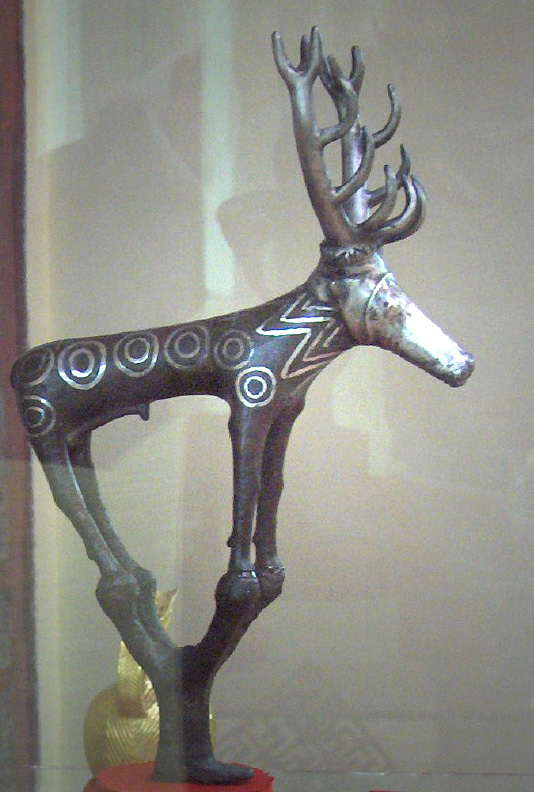
Stag statuette, symbol of a Hittite male god.

Hittite religion and mythology were heavily influenced by their Hattic, Mesopotamian, Canaanite, and Hurrian counterparts. In earlier times, Indo-European elements may still be clearly discerned.

Storm gods were prominent in the Hittite pantheon. Tarhunt (Hurrian's Teshub) was referred to as 'The Conqueror', 'The king of Kummiya', 'King of Heaven', 'Lord of the land of Hatti'. He was chief among the gods and his symbol is the bull. As Teshub he was depicted as a bearded man astride two mountains and bearing a club. He was the god of battle and victory, especially when the conflict involved a foreign power. Teshub was also known for his conflict with the serpent Illuyanka.

The Hittite gods were also honoured with festivals, such as Puruli in the spring, the nuntarriyashas festival in the autumn, and the KI.LAM festival of the gate house where images of the Storm God and up to thirty other idols were paraded through the streets.

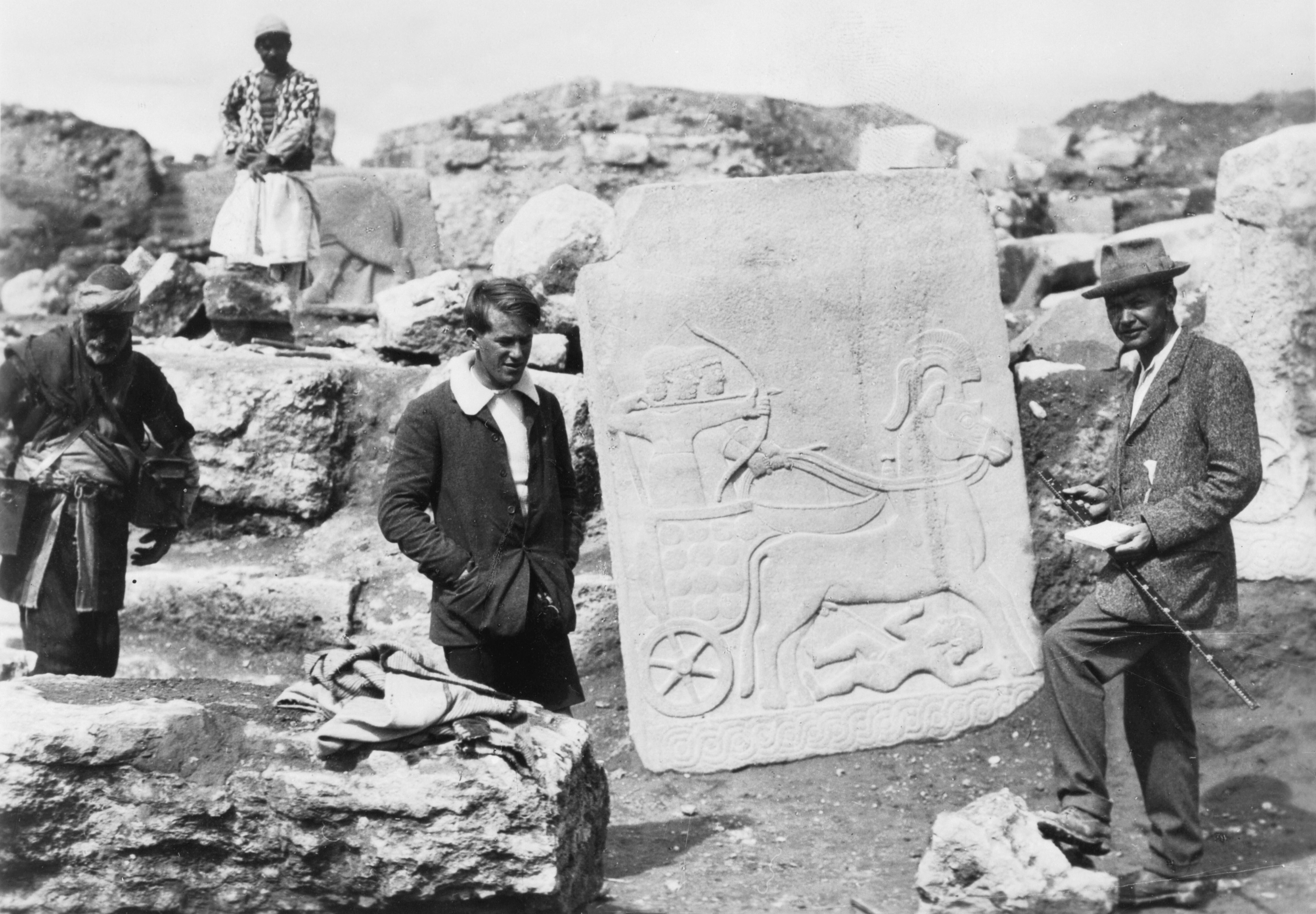
Early Hittite artifact found by T. E. Lawrence and Leonard Woolley (right) in Carchemish

=== Religion and imperial authority ===
The Hittite religion syncretized pre-existing Anatolian as a means to consolidate political and economic control. In the central Anatolian settlement of Ankuwa for example, the pre-Hittite goddess Hannikkun was renamed Kattaha and "downgraded" into a lesser deity of the greater Hittite pantheon.

== Law ==
Hittite laws, much like other records of the empire, are recorded on cuneiform tablets made from baked clay. What is understood to be the Hittite Law Code comes mainly from two clay tablets, each containing 186 articles, and are a collection of practiced laws from across the early Hittite Kingdom. In addition to the tablets, monuments bearing Hittite cuneiform inscriptions can be found in central Anatolia describing the government and law codes of the empire. The tablets and monuments date from the Old Hittite Kingdom (1650–1500 BC) to what is known as the New Hittite Kingdom (1500–1180 BC).

Between these time periods, different translations can be found that modernize the language and create a series of legal reforms in which many crimes are given more humane punishments. These changes could possibly be attributed to the rise of new and different kings throughout the history empire or to the new translations that change the language used in the law codes. In either case, the law codes of the Hittites provide very specific fines or punishments that are to be issued for specific crimes and have many similarities to Biblical laws found in the books of Exodus and Deuteronomy. In addition to criminal punishments, the law codes also provide instruction on certain situations such as inheritance and death.

=== Use of laws ===
The law articles used by the Hittites most often outline very specific crimes or offenses, either against the state or against other individuals, and provide a sentence for these offenses. The laws carved in the tablets are an assembly of established social conventions from across the empire. Hittite laws at this time have a prominent lack of equality in punishments in many cases, distinct punishments or compensations for men and women are listed. Free men most often received more compensation for offenses against them than free women did. Slaves, male or female, had very few rights, and could easily be punished or executed by their masters for crimes. Most articles describe destruction of property and personal injury, to which the most common sentence was payment for compensation of the lost property. Again, in these cases men oftentimes receive a greater amount of compensation than women. Other articles describe how marriage of slaves and free individuals should be handled. In any case of separation or estrangement, the free individual, male or female, would keep all but one child that resulted from the marriage.

Cases in which capital punishment is recommended in the articles most often seem to come from pre-reform sentences for severe crimes and prohibited sexual pairings. Many of these cases include public torture and execution as punishment for serious crimes against religion. Most of these sentences would begin to go away in the later stages of the Hittite Empire as major law reforms began to occur.

=== Law reform ===
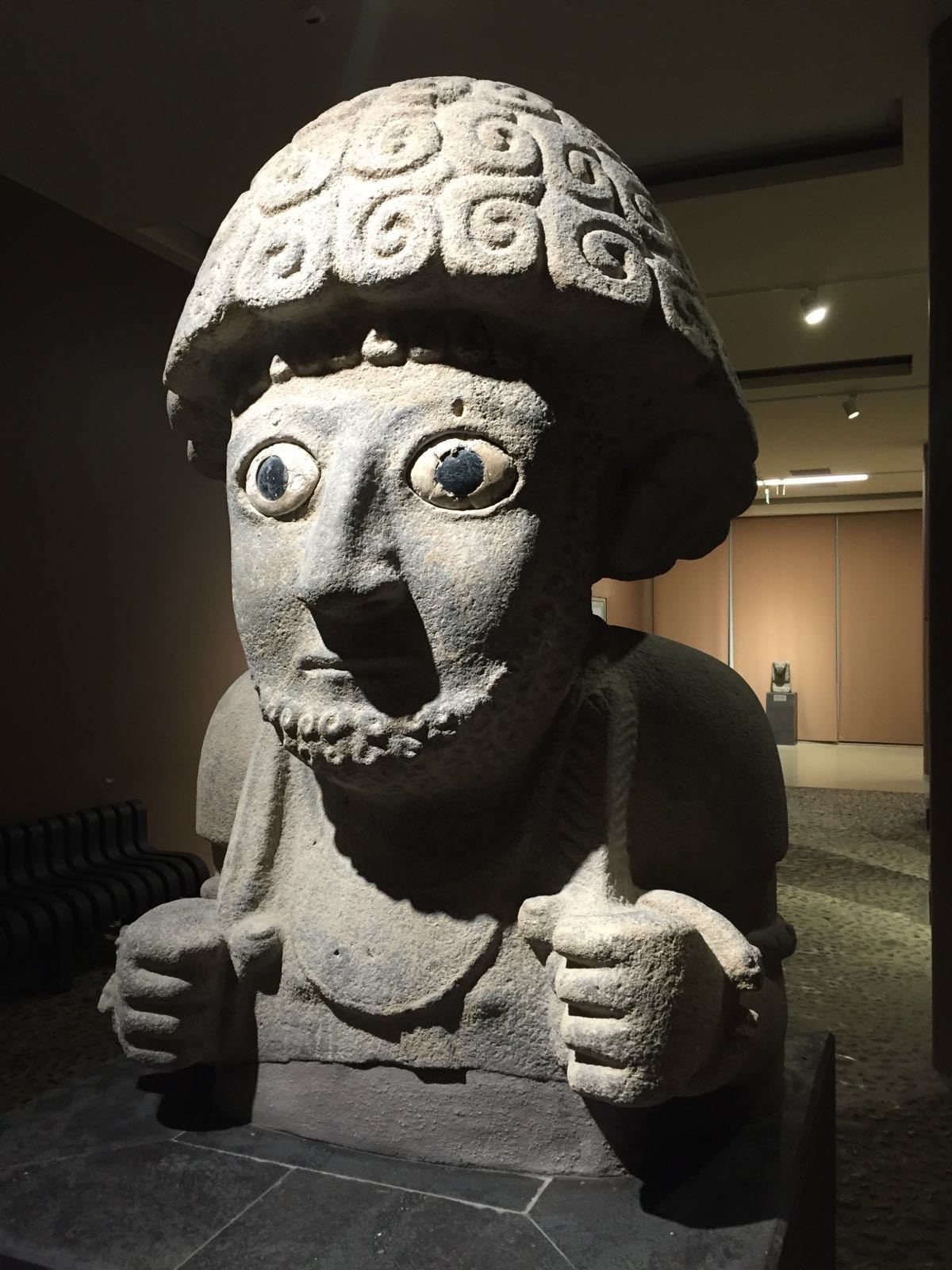
Post-Hittite period statue of king Šuppiluliuma of the Luwian state of Pattin (Hatay Archaeology Museum)

While different translations of laws can be seen throughout the history of the empire, the Hittite outlook of law was originally founded on religion and were intended to preserve the authority of the state. Additionally, punishments had the goal of crime prevention and the protection of individual property rights. The goals of crime prevention can be seen in the severity of the punishments issued for certain crimes. Capital punishment and torture are specifically mentioned as punishment for more severe crimes against religion and harsh fines for the loss of private property or life. The tablets also describe the ability of the king to pardon certain crimes, but specifically prohibit an individual being pardoned for murder.

At some point in the 16th or 15th century BC, Hittite law codes move away from torture and capital punishment and to more humanitarian forms of punishments, such as fines. Where the old law system was based on retaliation and retribution for crimes, the new system saw punishments that were much more mild, favoring monetary compensation over physical or capital punishment. Why these drastic reforms happened is not exactly clear, but it is likely that punishing murder with execution was deemed not to benefit any individual or family involved. These reforms were not just seen in the realm of capital punishment. Where major fines were to be paid, a severe reduction in penalty can be seen. For example, prior to these major reforms, the payment to be made for the theft of an animal was thirty times the animal's value; after the reforms, the penalty was reduced to half the original fine. Simultaneously, attempts to modernize the language and change the verbiage used in the law codes can be seen during this period of reform.

=== Examples of laws ===
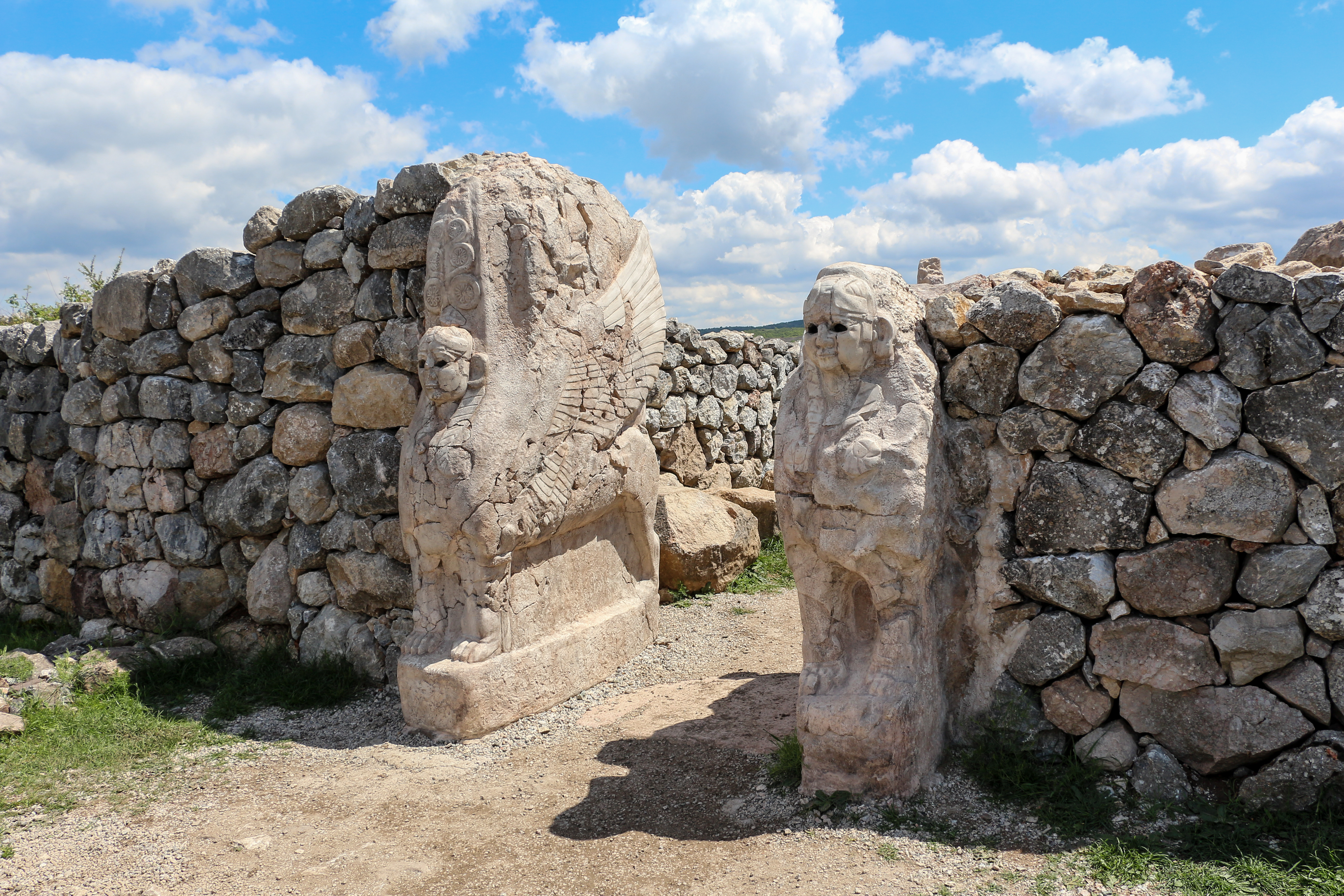
Sphinx Gate entrance of the city of Hattusa

Under both the old and reformed Hittite law codes, three main types of punishment can be seen: Death, torture, or compensation/fines. The articles outlined on the cuneiform tablets provide very specific punishments for crimes committed against the Hittite religion or against individuals. In many, but not all cases, articles describing similar laws are grouped together. More than a dozen consecutive articles describe what are known to be permitted and prohibited sexual pairings. These pairings mostly describe men (sometimes specifically referred to as free men, sometimes just men in general) having relations, be they consensual or not, with animals, step-family, relatives of spouses, or concubines. Many of these articles do not provide specific punishments but, prior to the law reforms, crimes against religion were most often punishable by death. These include incestuous marriages and sexual relations with certain animals. For example, one article states, "If a man has sexual relations with a cow, it is an unpermitted sexual pairing: he will be put to death." Similar relations with horses and mules were not subject to capital punishment, but the offender could not become a priest afterwards. Actions at the expense of other individuals most often see the offender paying some sort of compensation, be it in the form money, animals, or land. These actions could include the destruction of farmlands, death or injury of livestock, or assault of an individual. Several articles also specifically mention acts of the gods. If an animal were to die by certain circumstances, the individual could claim that it died by the hand of a god. Swearing that what they claim was true, it seems that they were exempt from paying compensation to the animal's owner. Injuries inflicted upon animals owned by another individual are almost always compensated with either direct payment, or trading the injured animal with a healthy one owned by the offender.

Not all laws prescribed in the tablets deal with criminal punishment. For example, the instructions of how the marriage of slaves and division of their children are given in a group of articles, "The slave woman shall take most of the children, with the male slave taking one child." Similar instructions are given to the marriage of free individuals and slaves. Other actions include how breaking of engagements are to be handled.

== Biblical Hittites ==
Before the archeological discoveries that revealed the Hittite civilization in Anatolia, the Hebrew Bible was the only source to mention a people by that name. Modern scholarship differentiates the Iron Age populations of Neo-Hittite states from the Bronze Age Hittites. English classicist Francis William Newman expressed a critical view common in the early 19th century that "no Hittite king could have compared in power to the King of Judah," illustrating the prevailing skepticism about the Hittites' historical significance among many scholars of his era.

As the discoveries in the second half of the 19th century revealed the scale of the Anatolian Hittite kingdom, Archibald Sayce asserted that, rather than being compared to Judah, the Anatolian civilization "[was] worthy of comparison to the divided Kingdom of Egypt", and was "infinitely more powerful than that of Judah". Sayce and other scholars also noted that Judah and the Hittites were never enemies in the Hebrew texts; in the Book of Kings, they supplied the Israelites with cedar, chariots, and horses, and in the Book of Genesis were friends and allies to Abraham. Uriah the Hittite was a captain in King David's army and counted as one of his "mighty men" in 1 Chronicles 11.

Biblical scholars following Max Müller have argued that the Bronze Age Hittites appear in Hebrew Bible literature and apocrypha as "Kittim", a people said to be named for a son of Javan.

== In ancient Greek mythology ==
One single mention of a Trojan ally named Keteians (Greek: Κητειοι) is made by Homer in the Odyssey. Some scholars have proposed that the Homeric Keteians correspond to the Bronze Age Hittites.

== Legacy ==
After the founding of the Republic of Turkey in 1923, Hittites attracted the attention of Turkish archaeologists such as Halet Çambel and Tahsin Özgüç. The new field of Hittitology also influenced the naming of Turkish institutions such as the state-owned Etibank ("Hittite bank"), and the founding of the Museum of Anatolian Civilizations in Ankara, 200 kilometers (120 mi) west of the Hittite capital of Hattusa, which houses the world's most comprehensive exhibition of Hittite art and artifacts.

== See also ==
- Hittite plague
- List of Hittite kings
- List of artifacts significant to the Bible
- Short chronology timeline

== Sources ==
- Akurgal, Ekrem (2001). The Hattian and Hittite Civilizations. Ankara: Ministry of Culture. ISBN 9789751727565.
- Anthony, David W. (2007), The Horse, the Wheel, and Language: How Bronze-Age Riders from the Eurasian Steppes Shaped the Modern World, Princeton University Press, ISBN 978-0-691-14818-2
- Anthony, David W. (2010). The horse, the wheel and language: how Bronze-Age riders from the Eurasian steppes shaped the modern world. Princeton, N.J. Woodstock: Princeton University Press. ISBN 978-0-691-14818-2.
- Archi, Alfonso (2010). "When Did the Hittites Begin to Write in Hittite?". Pax Hethitica: Studies on the Hittites and Their Neighbours in Honour of Itamar Singer. Wiesbaden: Harrassowitz Verlag. pp. 37–46. ISBN 9783447061193.
- Bachvarova, Mary R. (2010). "Manly Deeds: Hittite Admonitory History and Eastern Mediterranean Didactic Epic". Epic and History. Chichester: John Wiley & Sons. pp. 66–85. ISBN 9781444315646.
- Barjamovic, Gojko (2011). A Historical Geography of Anatolia in the Old Assyrian Colony Period. Copenhagen: Museum Tusculanum Press. ISBN 9788763536455.
- Beal, Richard H (1986). "The History of Kizzuwatna and the Date of the Šunaššura Treaty". Orientalia. Vol. 55. pp. 424ff.
- Beckman, Gary M. (1999). Hoffner, Harry A. (ed.). Hittite diplomatic texts (2nd ed.). Atlanta, Ga: Society of Biblical Literature, Scholars Press. ISBN 0-7885-0551-3.
- Bryce, Trevor R. (2002). Life and Society in the Hittite World. New York: Oxford University Press. ISBN 9780199241705.
- Bryce, Trevor R. (2005) [1998]. The Kingdom of the Hittites (PDF) (2nd ed.). New York: Oxford University Press. ISBN 9780199279081.
- Bryce, Trevor (October 2006). "The 'Eternal Treaty' from the Hittite perspective" (PDF). British Museum Studies in Ancient Egypt and Sudan (6): 1–11. Archived from the original (PDF) on 6 March 2009.
- Bryce, Trevor R. (2009). The Routledge Handbook of the Peoples and Places of Ancient Western Asia: The Near East from the Early Bronze Age to the fall of the Persian Empire. London, New York: Routledge. ISBN 9781134159079.
- Bryce, Trevor R. (2012). The World of The Neo-Hittite Kingdoms: A Political and Military History. New York: Oxford University Press. ISBN 9780191505027.
- Bryce, Trevor R. (2016). "The Land of Hiyawa (Que) Revisited". Anatolian Studies. 66: 67–79. doi:10.1017/S0066154616000053. JSTOR 24878364.
- Bryce, Trevor (2023). Warriors of Anatolia: A Concise history of the Hittites. Bloomsbury. ISBN 978-1-3503-4885-1.
- Ceram, C. W. (1963). The Secret of the Hittites: The Discovery of an Ancient Empire. Translated by Winston, Richard and Clara. New York: Alfred A. Knopf.
- Forlanini, Massimo (2010). "An Attempt at Reconstructing the Branches of the Hittite Royal Family of the Early Kingdom Period". Pax Hethitica: Studies on the Hittites and Their Neighbours in Honour of Itamar Singer. Wiesbaden: Harrassowitz Verlag. pp. 115–135. ISBN 9783447061193.
- Gilan, Amir. "Epic and History in Hittite Anatolia: In Search of a Local Hero". In Konstan & Raaflaub (2010), pp. 51–65.
- Gilan, Amir (2018). "In Search of a Distant Past: Forms of Historical Consciousness in Hittite Anatolia" (PDF). Anadolu. 44: 1–23. Archived from the original (PDF) on 20 March 2021.
- Gilibert, Alessandra (2011). Syro-Hittite Monumental Art and the Archaeology of Performance: The Stone Reliefs at Carchemish and Zincirli in the Earlier First Millennium BCE. Berlin-New York: Walter de Gruyter. ISBN 9783110222258.
- Giusfredi, Federico; et al. (2025). Contacts of Languages and Peoples in the Hittite and Post-Hittite World. Vol. 2. Brill. ISBN 978-90-04-72969-8.
- Goodnick-Westenholz, Joan (1997). Legends of the Kings of Akkade: The Texts. Winona Lake: Eisenbrauns. ISBN 9780931464850.
- Goodnick-Westenholz, Joan. "Historical Events and the Process of Their Transformation in Akkadian Heroic Traditions". In Konstan & Raaflaub (2010), pp. 26–50.
- Gurney, O.R. (1966). The Hittites. Penguin. ISBN 0-14-020259-5.
- Güterbock, Hans G. (1984). "Hittite Historiography: A Survey". History, Historiography and Interpretation. pp. 21–35. doi:10.1163/9789004631618_004. ISBN 978-90-04-63161-8.
- Hoffner, H. A. Jr. (1973). "The Hittites and Hurrians". In Wiseman, D.J. (ed.). Peoples of the Old Testament Times. Oxford: Clarendon Press. pp. 197–228.
- Beckman, Gary; Beal, Richard; McMahon, Gregory, eds. (2003). Hittite studies in honor of Harry A. Hoffner Jr: on the occasion of his 65th birthday. Winona Lake, Ind: Eisenbrauns. doi:10.5325/j.ctv1bxh2x6. ISBN 1-57506-079-5. JSTOR 10.5325/j.ctv1bxh2x6.
- Jasanoff, Jay H. (2003). Hittite and the Indo-European Verb. Oxford: Oxford University Press. ISBN 978-0-19-924905-3.
- Kloekhorst, Alwin (2007). Etymological Dictionary of the Hittite Inherited Lexicon. Brill. ISBN 978-90-04-16092-7.
- Kloekhorst, Alwin (19 June 2014). Personal names from Kaniš: the oldest Indo-European linguistic material. Farewell symposium Michiel de Vaan. Leiden. Archived from the original on 26 October 2020.
- Kloekhorst, Alwin; Waal, Willemijn (December 2019). "A Hittite Scribal Tradition Predating the Tablet Collections of Ḫattuša?". Zeitschrift für Assyriologie und vorderasiatische Archäologie. 109 (2): 189–203. doi:10.1515/za-2019-0014. hdl:1887/3199128.
- Kloekhorst, Alwin (2020). "The Authorship of the Old Hittite Palace Chronicle (cth 8): A Case for Anitta". Journal of Cuneiform Studies. 72: 143–155. doi:10.1086/709313. hdl:1887/3717115. JSTOR 48737334.
- Konstan, David; Raaflaub, Kurt A., eds. (2010). Epic and History. Chichester: John Wiley & Sons. ISBN 9781444315646.
- Macqueen, J. G. (1986). The Hittites and their contemporaries in Asia Minor (Rev. and enlarged ed.). London: Thames and Hudson. ISBN 0-500-02108-2.
- Mallory, J.P.; Adams, D.Q. (1997). Encyclopedia of Indo-European Culture. Taylor & Francis. ISBN 978-1-884964-98-5.
- Melchert, H. Craig. "The position of Anatolian". In Weiss, Michael; Garrett, Andrew (eds.). Handbook of Indo-European studies (PDF). Oxford: Oxford University Press. Archived (PDF) from the original on 24 September 2018. Listed as "to appear" on his website Archived 23 April 2024 at the Wayback Machine last updated on 29 May 2020.
- Melchert, Craig (2020). "Luwian". A Companion to Ancient Near Eastern Languages. Hoboken: John Wiley & Sons. pp. 239–256. ISBN 9781119193296.
- Mendenhall, George E. (1973). The tenth generation: the origins of the Biblical tradition. Baltimore: Johns Hopkins University Press. ISBN 0-8018-1654-8.
- Neu, Erich (1974). Der Anitta-Text (in German). Wiesbaden: O. Harrassowitz. ISBN 978-3-447-01571-4. Studien zu den Bogazkoy-Texten 18.
- Orlin, Louis L. (1970). Assyrian Colonies in Cappadocia. doi:10.1515/9783110816327. ISBN 978-3-11-081632-7.
- Parpola, Asko (2015). The Roots of Hinduism. doi:10.1093/acprof:oso/9780190226909.001.0001. ISBN 978-0-19-022690-9.
- Sürenhagen, Dietrich (October 2006). "Forerunners of the Hattusili-Ramesses treaty". British Museum Studies in Ancient Egypt and Sudan (6): 59–67. Archived from the original on 1 August 2019.
- Patri, Sylvain (2007). L'alignement syntaxique dans les langues Indo-Européennes d'Anatolie (in French). Wiesbaden: Harrassowitz Verlag. ISBN 978-3-447-05612-0. Archived from the original on 9 March 2025. Studien zu den Bogazkoy-Texten 49.
- Roebuck, Carl (1966). The World of Ancient Times. New York: Charles Scribner's Sons.
- Weeden, Mark (2013). "After the Hittites: The Kingdoms of Karkamish and Palistin in Northern Syria" (PDF). Bulletin of the Institute of Classical Studies. 56 (2): 1–20. doi:10.1111/j.2041-5370.2013.00055.x. Archived (PDF) from the original on 12 April 2021.
- Yakubovich, Ilya (2020). "Hittite". A Companion to Ancient Near Eastern Languages. Hoboken: John Wiley & Sons. pp. 221–237. ISBN 9781119193296.
