= List of state leaders in the 15th century BC =

State leaders in the 16th century BC – State leaders in the 14th century BC – State leaders by year

This is a list of state leaders in the 15th century BC (1500–1401 BC).

== Africa: Northeast ==
Egypt: New Kingdom

- Eighteenth Dynasty of the New Kingdom (complete list) –

- Thutmose I, King (1506–1493 BC)
- Thutmose II, King (1493–1479 BC)
- Thutmose III, King (1479–1425 BC)
- Hatshepsut, Queen (1479–1458 BC)
- Amenhotep II, King (1425–1398 BC)

== Asia ==
=== Asia: East ===
China

- Shang, China (complete list) –

- Tai Wu, King (c.1546–1471 BC)
- Yong Ji, King (c.1471–1459 BC)
- Zhong Ding, King (c.1459–1448 BC)
- Wai Ren, King (c.1448–1433 BC)
- He Dan Jia, King (c.1433–1424 BC)
- Zu Yi, King (c.1424–1405 BC)
- Zu Xin, King (c.1405–1389 BC)

=== Asia: Southeast ===
Vietnam

- Hồng Bàng dynasty (complete list) –

- Khôn line, (c.1632–c.1431 BC)
- Đoài line, (c.1431–c.1332 BC)

=== Asia: West ===
- Hittite: Old Kingdom, List –

- Hantili I, King (c.1526–1496 BC, short chronology)
- Zidanta I, King (c.1496–1486 BC, short chronology)
- Ammuna, King (c.1486–1466 BC, short chronology)
- Huzziya I, King (c.1466–1461 BC, short chronology)
- Telepinu, King (c.1430–1400 BC, short chronology)

- Hittite: Middle Kingdom, Asia Minor, Ruled c.mid to late 15th century BC —

- Alluwamna, King ( 000 )
- Tahurwaili, King ( 000 )
- Hantili II, King (c.1500–1450 BC, short chronology)
- Zidanta II, King ( 000 )
- Huzziya II, King ( 000 )
- Muwatalli I, King ( 000 )

- Mitanni, List –

- Kirta, ruler (c.1500 BC, short chronology)
- Shuttarna I, ruler ( 000 )
- Parshatatar or Parrattarna, ruler ( 000 )
- Shaushtatar, Ruler ( 000 ), contemporary of Idrimi of Alalakh
- Artatama I, Ruler ( 000 ), contemporary of Pharaohs Thutmose IV and Amenhotep II

- Tyre, Phoenecia, List –

- Agenor, King (c.1500 BC)

- Assyria: Old Assyrian Period, List

- Puzur-Ashur III, King (24 or 14 years), contemporary of Burna-Buriash I of Babylonia
- Enlil-nasir I, King (13 years)
- Nur-ili, King (12 years)
- Ashur-shaduni, King (1 month)
- Ashur-rabi I, King ( 000 )
- Ashur-nadin-ahhe I, King ( 000 )
- Enlil-Nasir II, King (c.1420–1415 BC, short chronology)
- Ashur-nirari II, King (c.1414–1408 BC, short chronology)
- Ashur-bel-nisheshu, King (c.1407–1399 BC, short chronology)

- First Sealand dynasty: rules Sumerian regions south of Old Babylonian Empire, but termed Second Dynasty of Babylon (complete list) –

- Ilum-ma-ili
- Itti-ili-nibi
- unknown king (?)
- Damqi-ilishu
- Ishkibal
- Shushushi
- Gulkishar
- ^{m}DIŠ+U-EN
- Peshgaldaramesh
- Ayadaragalama
- Akurduana
- Melamkurkurra

- First Sealand dynasty: rules Sumerian regions south of Old Babylonian Empire, but termed Second Dynasty of Babylon (complete list) –

- Ea-gamil, King (fl.c.1460 BC)

- Middle Babylonian period: Kassite dynasty, Third Dynasty of Babylon (complete list) –

- Agum II or Agum-Kakrime, King (c.1500 BC)
- Burnaburiash I, King (c.1500 BC), treaty with Puzur-Ashur III of Assyria
- Kashtiliash III, King (c.1500 BC)
- Ulamburiash, King (c.1480 BC)
- Agum III, King (c.1470 BC)
- Karaindash, King (c.1410 BC), contemporary of Amenophis III of Egypt
- Kadashman-Harbe I, King (c.1400 BC)

- Elam: Kidinuid dynasty (complete list) –

- Igi-hatet, King (early 15th century BC)
- Kidinu, King (early 15th century BC)
- Tan-Ruhuratir II, King (early 15th century BC)
- Shalla, King (uncertain)
- Tepti-Ahar, King (c.1440–1420 BC)
- Inshushinak-shar-ili, King (c.1400 BC)
