= Prehistory of Anatolia =

Prehistorical period in Western Asia

The prehistory of Anatolia stretches from the Paleolithic era through to the appearance of classical civilization in the middle of the 1st millennium BC. It is generally regarded as being divided into three ages reflecting the dominant materials used for the making of domestic implements and weapons: Stone Age, Bronze Age and Iron Age. The term Copper Age (Chalcolithic) is used to denote the period straddling the stone and Bronze Ages.

Anatolia (Greek: Ἀνατολία (Anatolía), Turkish: Anadolu), also known by the Latin name of Asia Minor, is considered to be the westernmost extent of Western Asia. Geographically it encompasses the central uplands of modern Turkey, from the coastal plain of the Aegean Sea east to the western edge of the Armenian Highlands and from the narrow coast of the Black Sea south to the Taurus Mountains and Mediterranean Sea coast.

The earliest representations of culture in Anatolia can be found in several archaeological sites located in the central and eastern part of the region. Stone Age artifacts such as animal bones and food fossils were found at Burdur (north of Antalya). Although the origins of some of the earliest peoples are shrouded in mystery, the remnants of Bronze Age civilizations, such as Troy, the Hattians, the Akkadian Empire, Assyria, and the Hittites, provide us with many examples of the daily lives of its citizens and their trade. After the fall of the Hittites, the new states of Phrygia and Lydia stood strong on the western coast together with Lykia and Caria. Only the threat from a distant Persian kingdom prevented them from advancing past their peak of success.

== Stone Age ==
The Stone Age is a prehistoric period in which stone was widely used in the manufacture of implements. This period occurred after the appearance of the genus Homo about 2.6 million years ago and roughly lasted 2.5 million years to the period between 4500 and 2000 BC with the appearance of metalworking.

=== Paleolithic ===
In 2014, a stone tool was found in the Gediz River that was securely dated to between 1.17 and 1.24 million years ago. Evidence of Paleolithic (prehistory 500,000–10,000 BC) habitation include the Yarimburgaz Cave (Istanbul), Karain Cave (Antalya), and the Okuzini, Beldibi and Belbasi, Kumbucagi and Kadiini caves in adjacent areas. Examples of paleolithic humans can be found in the Museum of Anatolian Civilizations (Ankara), in the Archaeological Museum in Antalya, and in other Turkish institutions.

Evidence of fruit and of animal bones has been found at Yarimburgaz. The caves of the Mediterranean region contain murals. Original claims (1975) of 250,000-year-old, Middle Pleistocene, Homo sapiens footprints at Kula and Karain Caves are now considered erroneous and have been revised to the Late Pleistocene era.

=== Mesolithic ===
Remains of a Mesolithic culture in Anatolia can be found along the Mediterranean coast and also in Thrace and the western Black Sea area. Mesolithic remains have been located in the same caves as the paleolithic artefacts and drawings. Additional findings come from the Sarklimagara cave in Gaziantep, the Baradiz cave (Burdur), as well as the cemeteries and open air settlements at Sogut Tarlasi, Biris (Bozova) and Urfa.

=== Neolithic ===
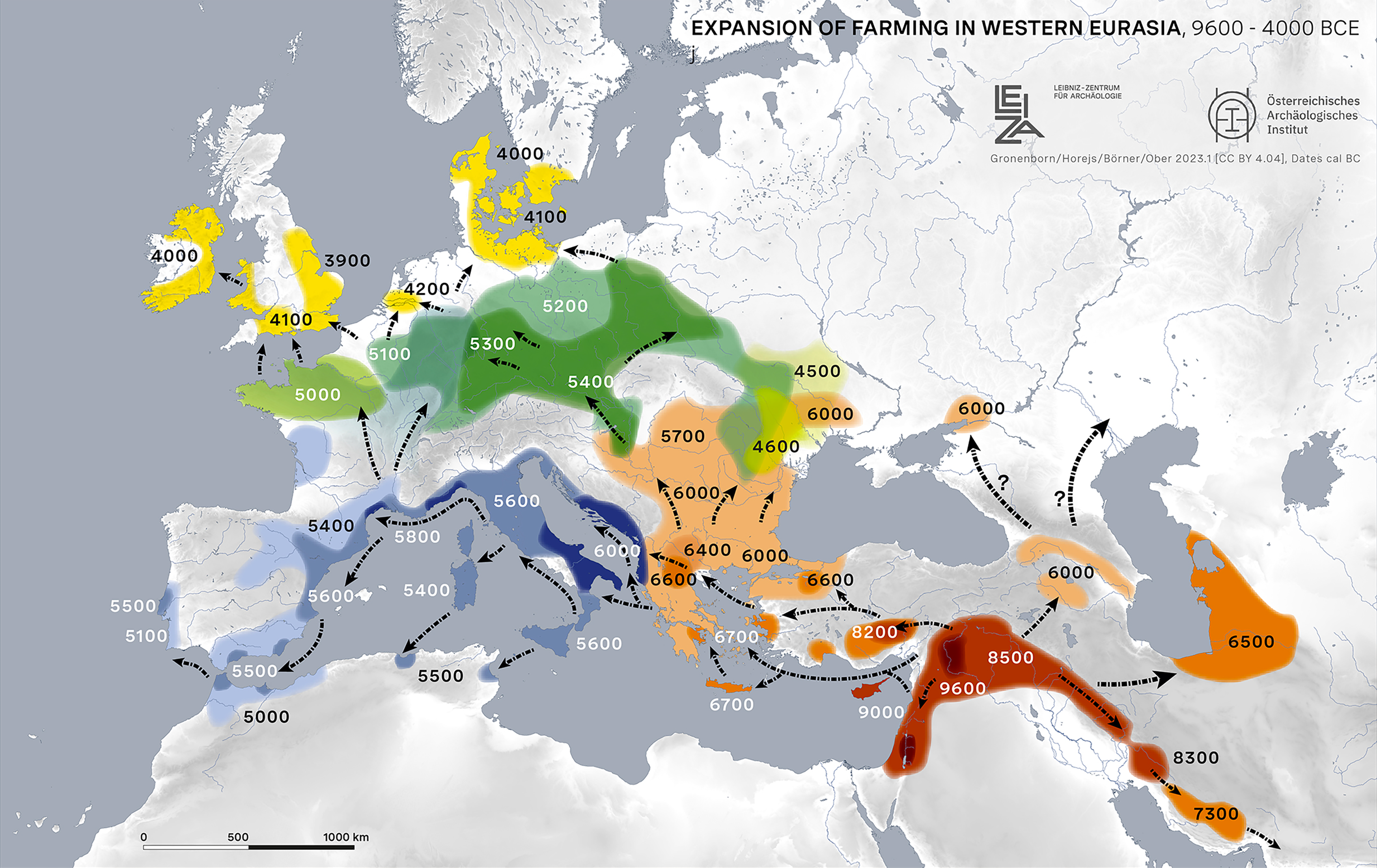
Spread of agriculture from Neolithic Anatolia into Europe

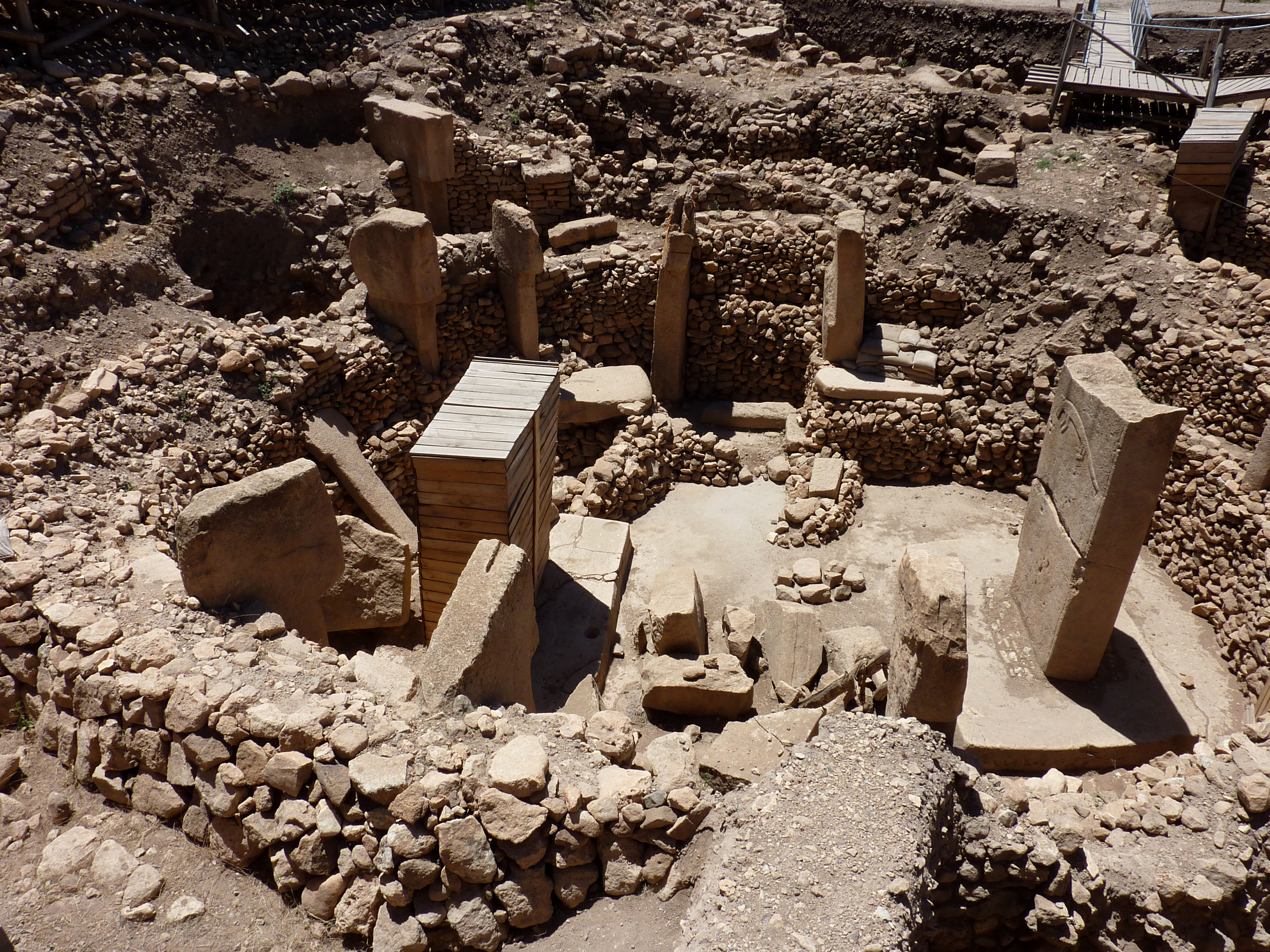
Göbekli Tepe site (1)

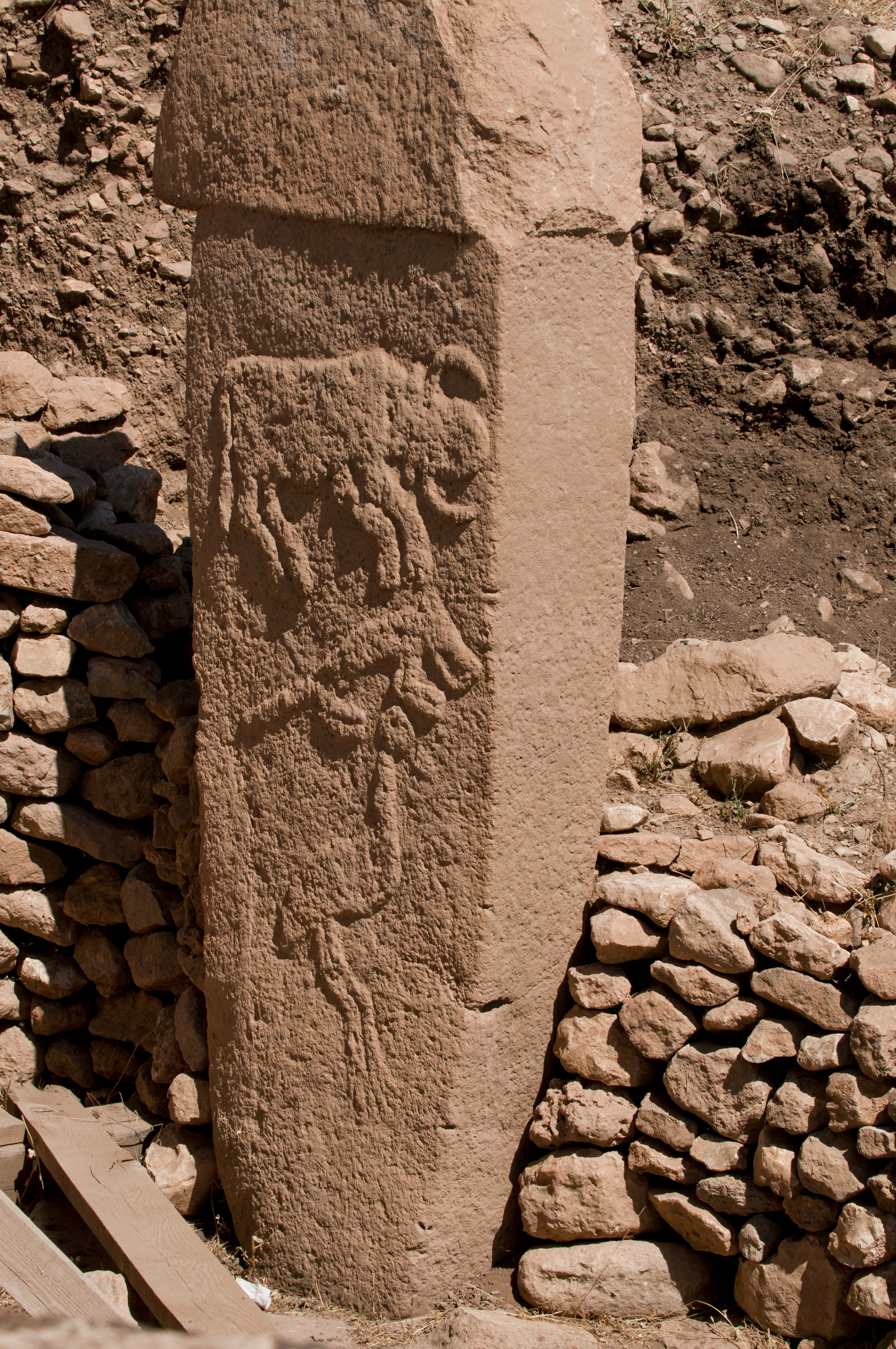
Pillar 2 from Enclosure A (Layer III) with low reliefs of what are believed to be a bull, fox, and crane.

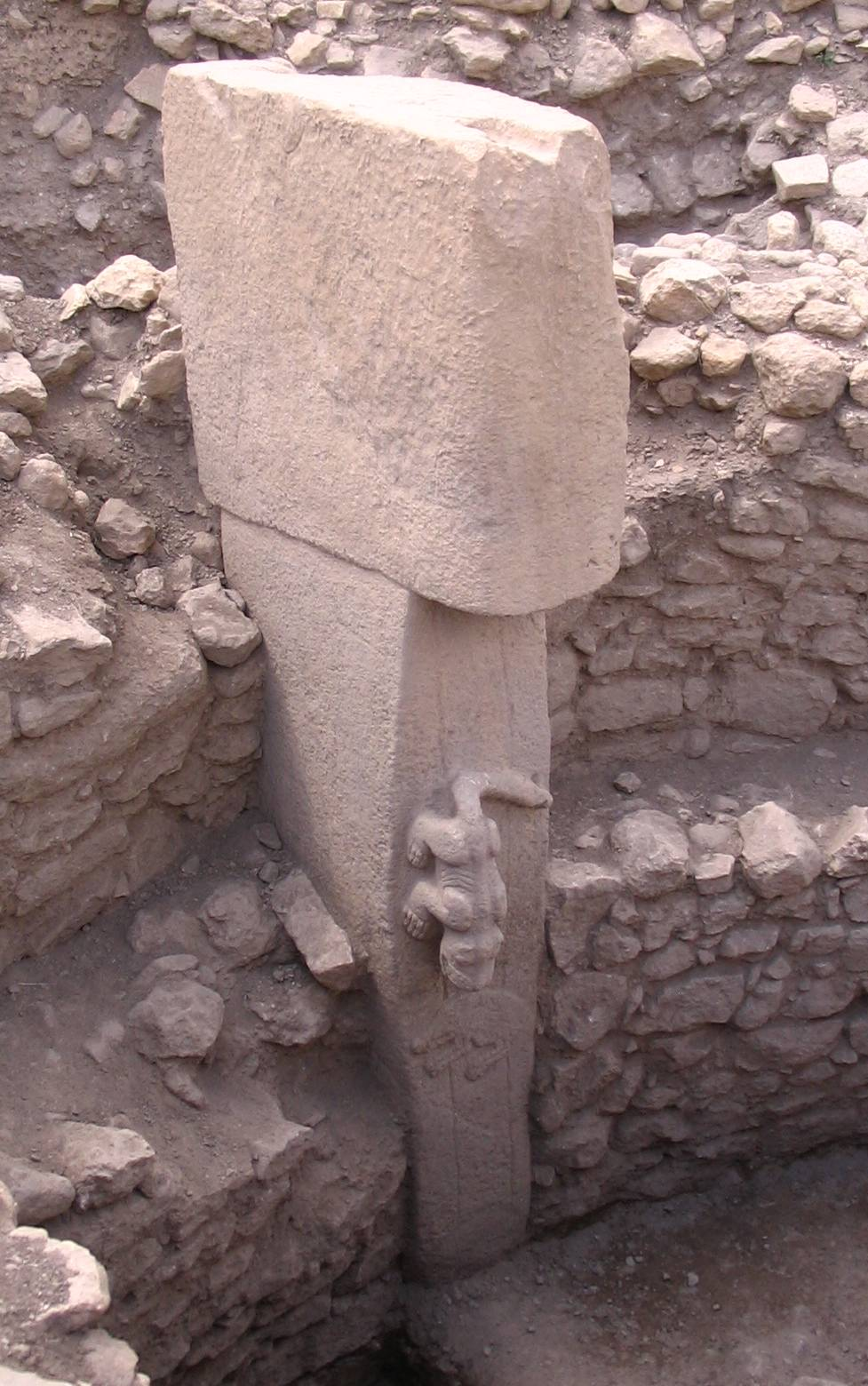
Pillar 27 from Enclosure C (Layer III) with the sculpture of a predatory animal

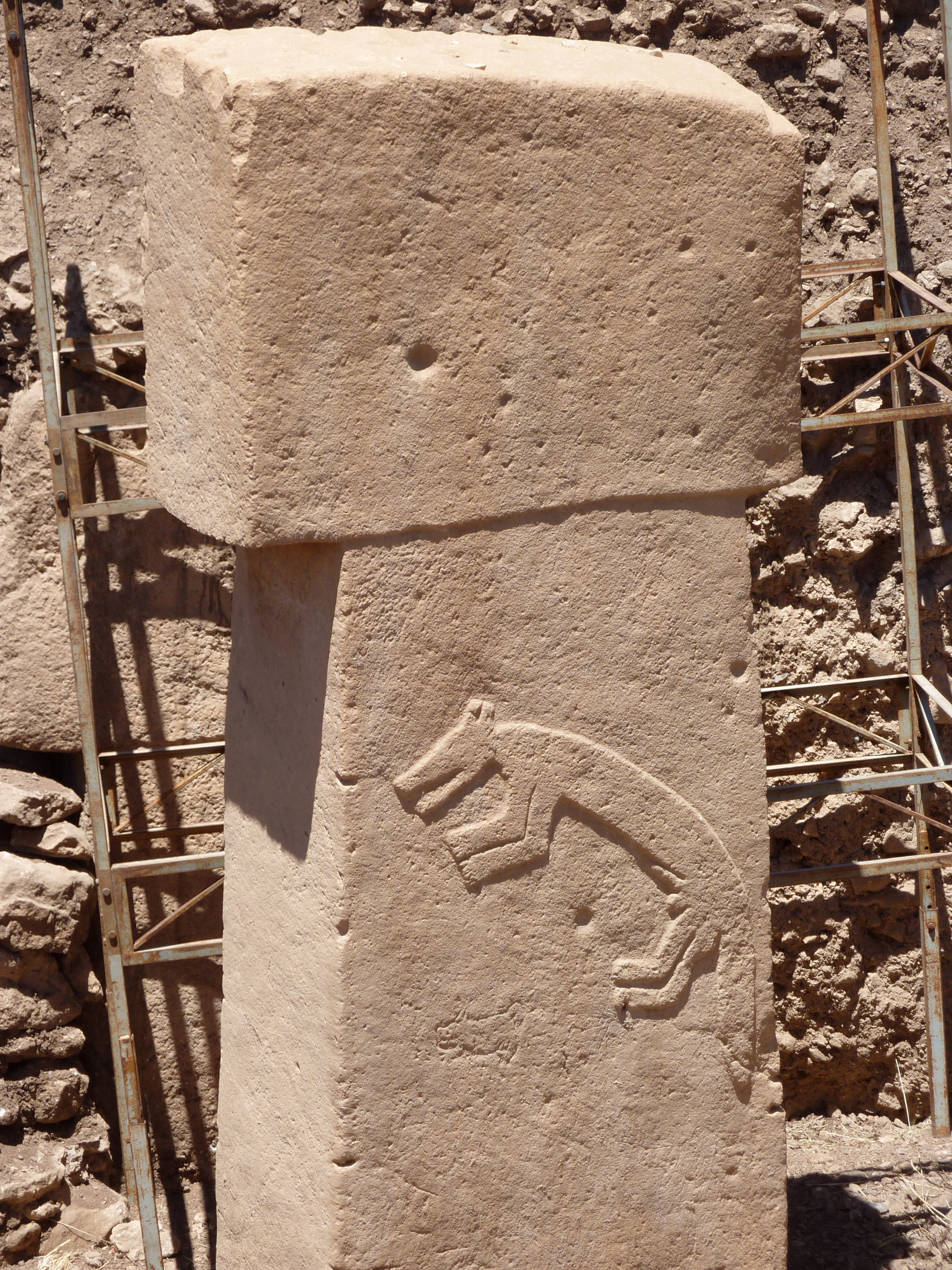
Pillar with the sculpture of a fox

Because of its strategic location at the intersection of Asia and Europe, Anatolia has been the center of several civilizations since prehistoric times. The Anatolian hypothesis, first developed by British archaeologist Colin Renfrew in 1987, proposes that the dispersal of Proto-Indo-Europeans originated in Neolithic Anatolia. It is the main competitor to the Kurgan hypothesis, or steppe theory, the more favoured view academically. Neolithic settlements include Çatalhöyük, Çayönü, Nevali Cori, Aşıklı Höyük, Boncuklu Höyük, Hacilar, Göbekli Tepe, Karahan Tepe, Norşuntepe, Kosk, and Mersin.

Çatalhöyük (Central Turkey) is considered the most advanced of these, and Çayönü in the east the oldest (c. 7250–6750 BC). We have a good idea of the town layout at Çayönü, based on a central square with buildings constructed of stone and mud. Archeological finds include farming tools that suggest both crops and animal husbandry as well as domestication of the dog. Religion is represented by figurines of Cybele, the mother goddess. Hacilar (Western Turkey) followed Çayönü, and has been dated to 7040 BC.

== Chalcolithic (Copper) Age ==
Straddling the Neolithic and early Bronze Age, the Chalcolithic era (c. 5500–3000 BC) is defined by the first metal implements made with copper. This age is represented in Anatolia by sites at Hacilar, Beycesultan, Canhasan, Mersin Yumuktepe, Elazig Tepecik, Malatya Degirmentepe, Norşuntepe, and Istanbul Fikirtepe.

== Bronze Age ==
The Bronze Age (c. 3300–1200 BC) is characterised by the use of copper and its tin alloy, bronze, for manufacturing implements. Asia Minor was one of the first areas to develop bronze making.

=== Early Bronze Age (3000–2500 BC) ===
Although the first habitation appears to have occurred as early as the 6th millennium BC during the Chalcolithic period, functioning settlements trading with each other occurred during the 3rd millennium BC. A settlement on a high ridge would become known as Büyükkaya, and later as the city of Hattush, the center of this civilization. Later still it would become the Hittite stronghold of Hattusha and is now Boğazköy. Remnants of the Hattian civilization have been found both under the lower city of Hattusha and in the higher areas of Büyükkaya and Büyükkale, Another settlement was established at Yarikkaya, about 2 km to the northeast.

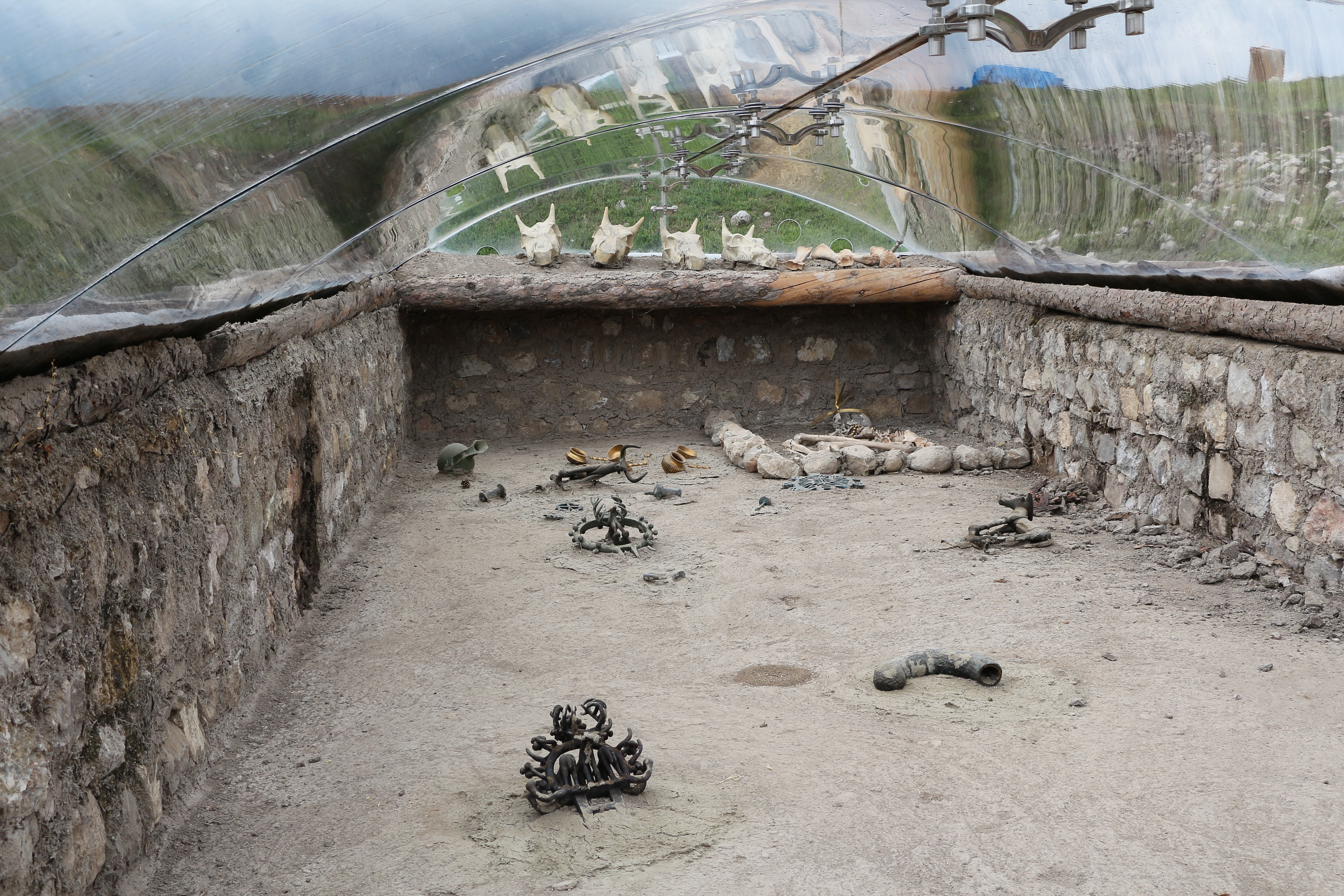
A royal tomb in Alaca Höyük

The discovery of mineral deposits in this part of Anatolia allowed Anatolians to develop metallurgy, producing items such as the implements found in the royal graves at Alaca Höyük, about 25 km from Boğazköy, which it preceded, dating from 2400 to 2200 BC. Other Hattian centers include Hassum, Kanesh, Purushanda, and Zalwar. During this time the Hattians engaged in trade with city-states such as those of Sumer, which needed timber products from the Amanus mountains.

Anatolia had remained in the prehistoric period until it entered the sphere of influence of the Akkadian Empire in the 24th century BC under Sargon of Akkad, particularly in eastern Anatolia. However, the Akkadian Empire suffered problematic climate changes in Mesopotamia, as well as a reduction in available manpower that affected trade. This led to its fall around 2150 BC at the hands of the Gutians. The interest of the Akkadians in the region as far as it is known was for exporting various materials for manufacturing. Bronze metallurgy had spread to Anatolia from the Transcaucasian Kura-Araxes culture in the late 4th millennium BC. While Anatolia was well endowed with copper ores, there was no evidence of substantial workings of the tin required to make bronze in Bronze-Age Anatolia.

=== Middle Bronze Age (2500–2000 BC) ===
At the origins of written history, the Anatolian plains inside the area ringed by the Kızılırmak River were occupied by the first defined civilization in Anatolia, a non-Indo-European indigenous people named the Hattians (c. 2500 BC – c. 2000 BC). During the middle Bronze Age, the Hattian civilization, including its capital of Hattush, continued to expand. The Anatolian middle Bronze Age influenced the early Minoan culture of Crete (3400 to 2200 BC) as evidenced by archaeological findings at Knossos.

=== Late Bronze Age (2000–1200 BC) ===
Map of the Ancient Near East around 1400 BC

==== Hattians ====
The Hattians came into contact with Assyrians traders from Assur in Mesopotamia such as at Kanesh (Nesha) near modern Kültepe who provided them with the tin needed to make bronze. These trading posts or Karums (Akkadian for Port), have lent their name to a period, the Karum Period. The Karums, or Assyrian trading colonies, persisted in Anatolia until Hammurabi conquered Assyria and it fell under Babylonian domination in 1756 BC. These Karums represented separate residential areas where the traders lived, protected by the Hattites, and paying taxes in return. Meanwhile, the fortifications of Hattush were strengthened with construction of royal residences on Büyükkale.

After the Assyrians overthrew their Gutian neighbours (c. 2050 BC) they claimed the local resources, notably silver, for themselves. However the Assyrians brought writing to Anatolia, a necessary tool for trading and business. These transactions were recorded in Akkadian cuneiform on clay tablets. Records found at Kanesh use an advanced system of trading computations and credit lines. The records also indicate the names of the cities where the transaction occurred.

==== Hittites ====
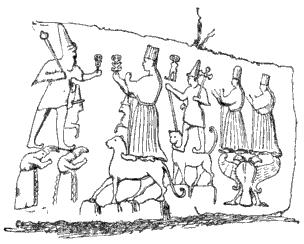
A drawing of rock-carved reliefs of a procession of Hittite deities in Yazılıkaya, Turkey.

The history of the Hittite civilization is known mostly from cuneiform texts found in the area of their empire, and from diplomatic and commercial correspondence found in various archives in Egypt and the Middle East.

===== Old Kingdom =====
Hattian civilization was also impacted by an invading Indo-European people, the Hittites, in the early 18th century BC, Hattush being burned to the ground in 1700 BC by King Anitta of Kussar after overthrowing King Piyushti. He then placed a curse on the site and set up his capital at Kanesh 160 km south east. The Hittites absorbed the Hattians over the next century, a process that was essentially complete by 1650 BC. Eventually Hattusha became a Hittite centre by the second half of the 17th century BC, and King Hattusili I (1586–1556 BC) moved his capital back to Hattusha from Neša (Kanesh).

The Old Hittite Empire (17th–15th centuries BC) was at its height in the 16th century BC, encompassing central Anatolia, north-western Syria as far as Ugarit, and upper Mesopotamia. Kizzuwatna in southern Anatolia controlled the region separating the Hittite Empire from Syria, thereby greatly affecting trade routes. The peace was kept in accordance with both empires through treaties that established boundaries of control.

===== Middle Kingdom =====
Following the reign of Telipinu (c. 1460 BC) the Hittite kingdom entered a relatively weak and poorly documented phase, known as the Middle Kingdom, from the reign of Telipinu's son-in-law, Alluwamna (mid-15th century BC) to that of Muwatalli I (c. 1400 BC).

===== New Kingdom =====
Approximate extent of Hittite rule, c. 1350–1300 BC, with Arzawa, the Lukka, and the Ahhiyawa to the west, and Mitanni to the southeast.

King Tudhaliya I (early 14th century BC) ushered in a new era of Hittite power, often referred to as the Hittite Empire. The Kings took on a divine role in Hittite society and the Hittite peoples, often allied with neighbours such as the Kizzuwatna began to expand again, moving into Western Anatolia, absorbing the Luwian state of Arzawa and the Assuwa League.

It was not until the reign of King Suppiluliumas (c. 1344–1322 BC) that Kizzuwatna was taken over fully, although the Hittites still preserved their cultural accomplishments in Kummanni (now Şar, Turkey) and Lazawantiya, north of Cilicia.

In the 13th century, after the reign of Hattusili III (c. 1267–1237 BC), Hittite power began to wane, threatened by Egypt to the South and Assyria to the East, effectively ending with Suppiluliuma II (c. 1207–1178 BC).

===== Syro-Hittite era =====
After 1180s BC, amid general turmoil in the Levant associated with the sudden arrival of the Sea Peoples, and the collapse of the Bronze Age the empire disintegrated into several independent Syro-Hittite (Neo-Hittite) city-states, some of which survived until as late as the 8th century BC. In the West, Greeks were arriving on the Anatolian coast, and the Kaskas along the northern Black Sea coast. Eventually Hattusha itself was destroyed around 1200 BC and the age of Empires shifted to that of regional states as the Bronze Age shifted into the Iron Age.

==== Mycenaean presence ====
There is very little information about early Mycenaean presence in Anatolia. Miletus was clearly a center of Mycenaean presence in Asia Minor in the period c. 1450–1100 BC. The zone of intense Mycenaean settlement extends as far as Bodrum/Halicarnassus.

The Mycenaean sphere of influence in Asia Minor is also relatively restricted geographically: Intense Mycenaean settlement is to be found in the archaeological records only for the region between the Peninsula of Halicarnassus in the south and Milet [Miletus] in the north (and in the islands off this coastline, between Rhodes in the south and Kos – possibly also Samos – in the north).

Attarsiya was a 15th–14th century BC military leader who was probably Greek. He conducted the first recorded Mycenaean military activity on the Anatolian mainland. His activities are recorded in the Hittite archives of c. 1400 BC.

British archaeologist J.M. Cook studied the Greek historical tradition about the Carians, and drew attention to the many similarities between the Carians and the Mycenaeans.

== Iron Age ==
The Iron Age (c. 1300–600 BC) was characterised by the widespread use of iron and steel. It is also an age known for the development of various alphabets and early literature. It formed the last phase of Pre-history, spanning the period between the collapse of the Bronze Age and the rise of classical civilisation. In Anatolia, the dissolution of the Hittite Empire was replaced by regional Neo-Hittite powers including Troad, Ionia, Lydia, Caria and Lycia in the west; Phrygia, centrally and Cimmeria and Urartu in the northeast, while the Assyrians occupied much of the southeast.

Regions of Anatolia, c. 500 BC. Aegean Greek settlements italicised

=== Western Anatolia ===
==== Troad ====
The Troad, on the Biga peninsula, was settled before 3000 BC. The site of Troy was occupied for more than three millennia, its archaeological layers numbered I-IX. Legends of the Trojan War may have a basis in historical events concerning Late Bronze Age Troy.

==== Aeolis ====
Ancient Greek settlements in western Anatolia (11th–8th centuries BC). Halikarnassus was initially Dorian, then Ionian. Smyrna changed from Aeolian to Ionian

Aeolis was an area of the northwestern Aegean coast, between Troad and Ionia, from the Hellespont to the Hermus River (Gediz), west of Mysia and Lydia. By the 8th century BC the twelve most important cities formed a league. In the 6th century the cities were progressively conquered by Lydia, and then Persia.

==== Ionia ====
Ionia was part of a group of settlements on the central Aegean coast bounded by Lydia to the east, and Caria to the south, known as the Ionian league. Ionians had been expelled from the Peloponnesus by the Dorians, and were resettled on the Aegean coastline of Anatolia by the Athenians to whose land they had fled. By the time of the last Lydian king, Croesus (560–545 BC) Ionia fell under Lydian, and then Persian rule. With the defeat of Persia by the Greeks, Ionia again became independent until absorbed into the Roman province of Asia.

==== Lydia (Maeonia) ====
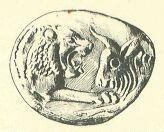
Lydian electrum coin, depicting a lion and bull.

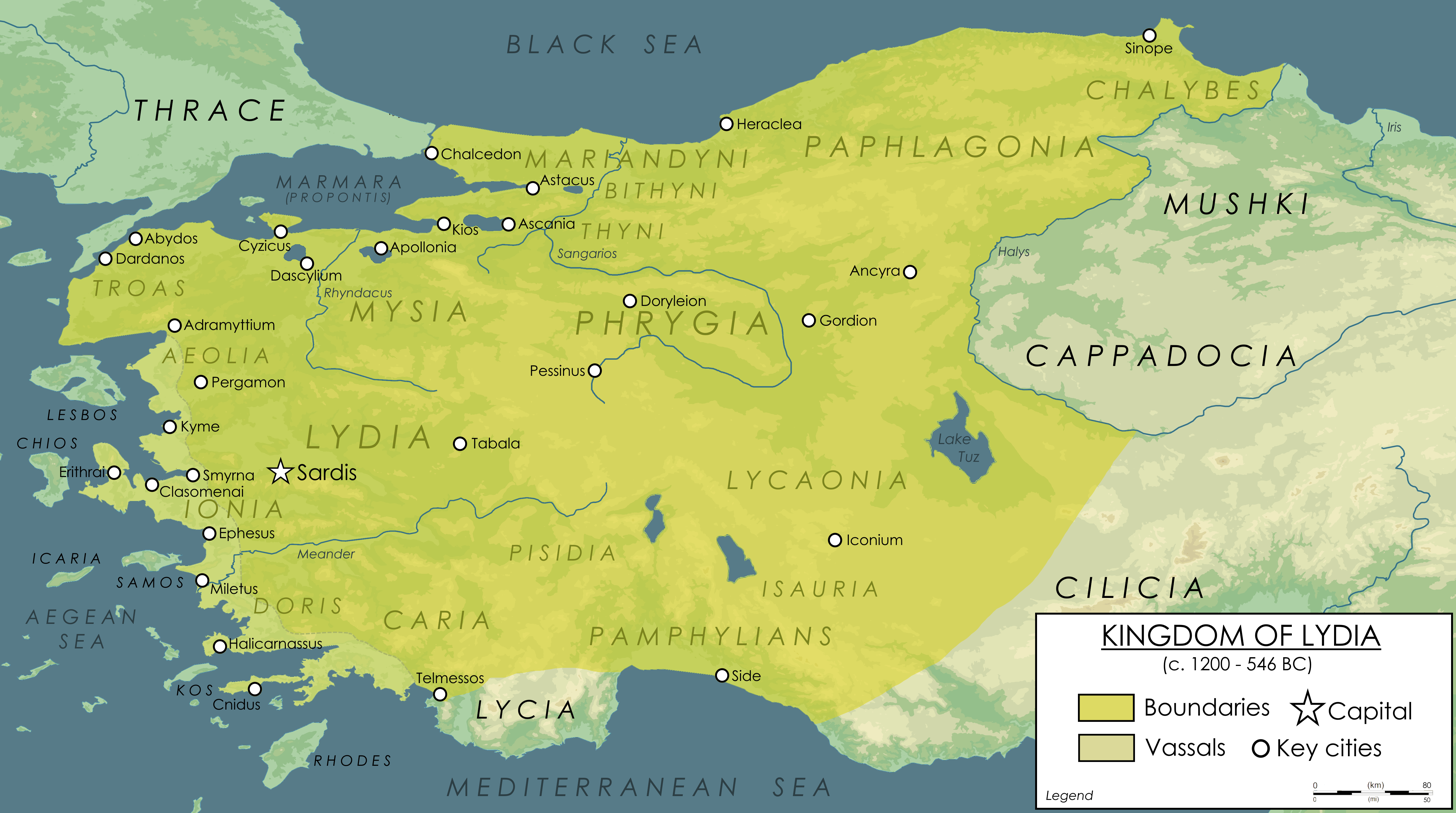
Map of the Lydian Empire under Croesus, 6th century BC

Lydia, or Maeonia as it was called before 687 BC, was a major part of the history of western Anatolia, beginning with the Atyad dynasty, who first appeared around 1300 BC. Lydia was situated to the west of Phrygia and east of the Aegean Sea settlement of Ionia. The Lydians were Indo-European, speaking an Anatolian language related to Luwian and Hittite.

The Heraclids, managed to rule successively from 1185 to 687 BC despite a growing presence of Greek influences along the Mediterranean coast. As Greek cities such as Smyrna, Colophon, and Ephesus rose, the Heraclids became weaker and weaker. The last king, Candaules, was murdered by his friend and lance-bearer named Gyges, and he took over as ruler. Gyges waged war against the intruding Greeks, and soon faced by a grave problem as the Cimmerians began to pillage outlying cities within the kingdom. It was this wave of attacks that led to the incorporation of the formerly independent Phrygia and its capital Gordium into the Lydian domain. It was not until the successive rules of Sadyattes and Alyattes, ending in 560 BC, that the attacks of the Cimmerians ended for good.

Under the reign of the last Lydian king Croesus, Lydia reached its greatest expansion. Persia was invaded first at the Battle of Pteria ending without a victor. Progressing deeper into Persia, Croesus was thoroughly defeated in the Battle of Thymbra at the hands of the Persian Cyrus II in 546 BC.

Following Croesus' defeat, Lydia fell under the hegemony of Persia, Greece, Rome and Byzantium until finally being absorbed into the Turkish lands.

==== Caria ====
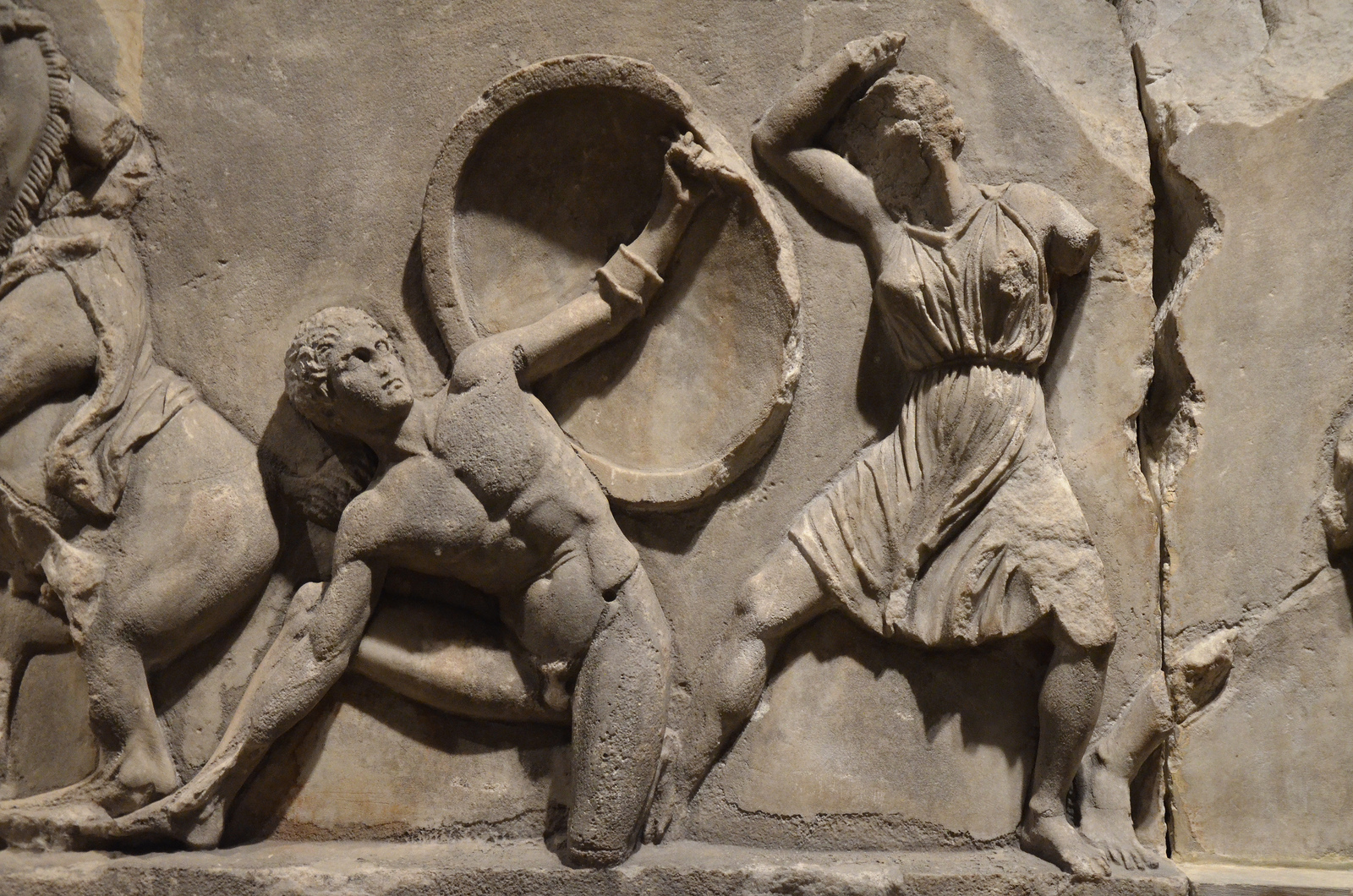
Relief of an Amazonomachy from the Mausoleum at Halicarnassus.

Caria forms a region in Western Anatolia, south of Lydia, east of Ionia and north of Lycia. Partially Greek (Ionian and Dorian), and possibly partially Minoan. Caria became subject to Persia, Greece and Rome before being absorbed into Byzantium. Remnants of the Carian civilisation form a rich legacy in the southwestern Aegean. Caria managed to maintain a relative degree of independence during successive occupation, and its symbol, the double headed axe is seen as a mark of defiance and can be seen inscribed on many buildings. The mausoleum at Halicarnassus (modern Bodrum), the tomb of the Persian Satrap Mausolus, was considered one of the Seven Wonders of the Ancient World. Other important relics include that of Mylasa (Milas) at one time capital of Caria and administrative seat of Mausolus, Labranda in the mountains high above Mylasa and Euromos (Herakleia) near Lake Bafa.

==== Lycia ====
Lycia formed the southernmost settlement in Western Anatolia on what is now the Teke peninsula on the western Mediterranean coast. There many historic Lycian sites include Xanthos, Patara, Myra, Pinara, Tlos, Olympos and Phaselis. Emerging at the end of the Bronze Age as a Neo-Hittite league of city states whose governance model still influences political systems today. Alternating between Persian and Greek rule it eventually was incorporated into Rome, Byzantium and the Turkish lands.

=== Central Anatolia ===
==== Phrygia ====
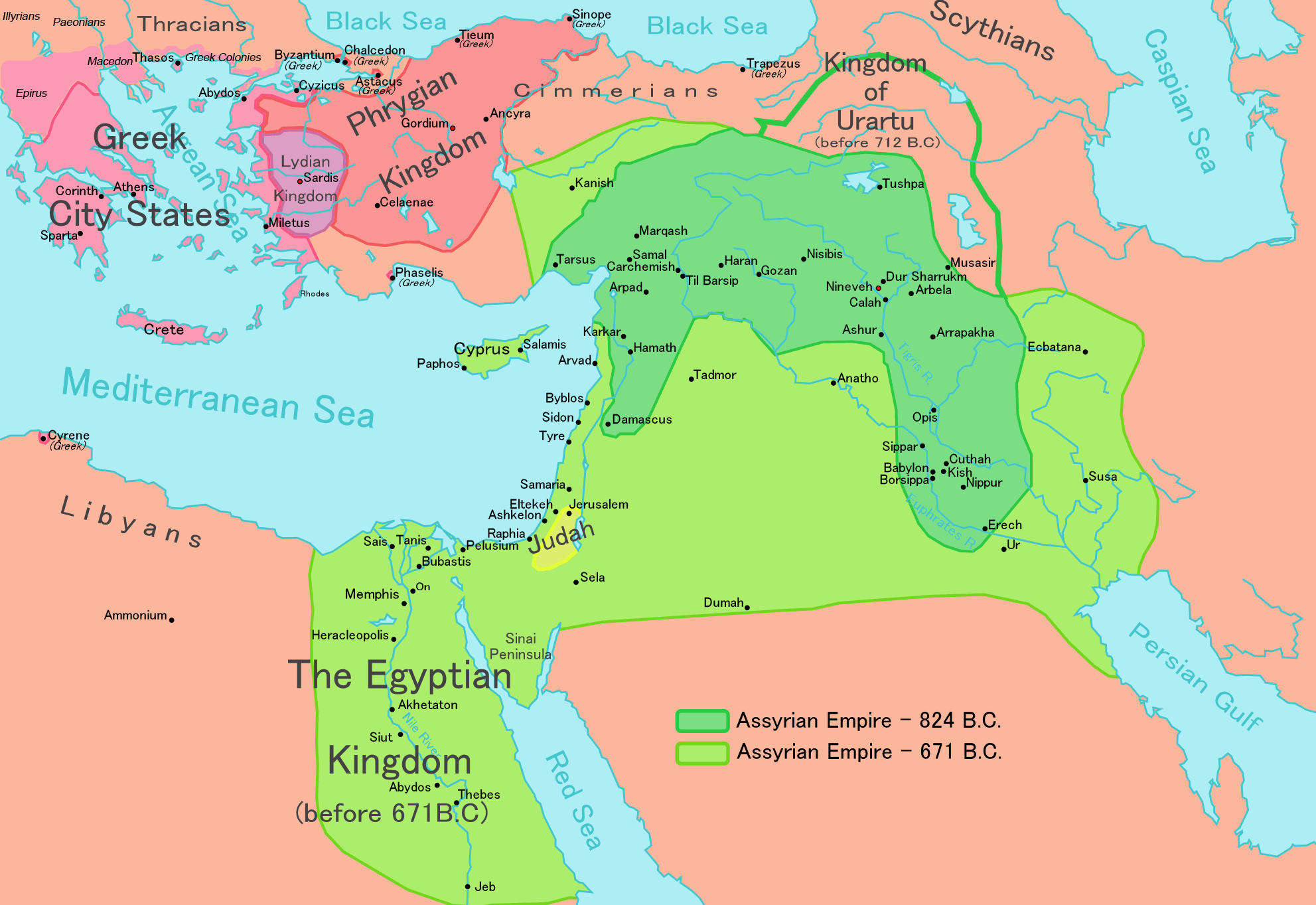
Lydia, Phrygia, Cimmeria and Assyria, 9th-7th centuries BC

The west-central area of Anatolia became the domain of the Phrygian Kingdom following the fragmentation of the Hittite Empire during the 12th century BC, existing independently until the 7th century BC, and strongly featured in Greek mythology. Although their origin is disputed, their language more resembled Greek (Dorian) than the Hittites whom they succeeded. Possibly from the region of Thrace, the Phrygians eventually established their capital at Gordium (now Yassıhüyük) and an important religious center at Yazılıkaya. Known as the Mushki to the Assyrians, the Phrygian people lacked central control in their style of government, and yet established an extensive network of roads. They also held tightly onto a lot of the Hittite facets of culture and adapted them over time.

Well known from ancient Greek and Roman writers is King Midas, the last king of the Phrygian Kingdom. The mythology of Midas revolves around his ability to turn objects to gold by mere touch, as granted by Dionysos, and his unfortunate encounter with Apollo from which his ears are turned into the ears of a donkey. The historical record of Midas shows that he lived approximately between 740 and 696 BC, and represented Phrygia as a great king. Most historians now consider him to be King Mita of the Mushki as noted in Assyrian accounts. The Assyrians thought of Mita as a dangerous foe, for Sargon II, their ruler at the time, was quite happy to negotiate a peace treaty in 709 BC. This treaty had no effect on the advancing Cimmerians in the East, who streamed into Phrygia and led to the downfall and suicide of King Midas in 696 BC.

After Midas's death, Phrygia lost its independence, becoming respectively a vassal state of its western neighbour, Lydia, Persia, Greece, Rome and Byzantium, disappearing in the Turkish era.

=== Eastern Anatolia ===
==== Cimmeria ====
Cimmerian invasions of Colchis, Urartu and Assyria 715–713 BC

Cimmeria was a region of northeastern Anatolia, appearing in the 8th century BC from the north and east, in the face of the eastern Scythian advance. They continued to move west, invading and subjugating Phrygia (696–695 BC), penetrating as far south as Cilicia, and west into Ionia after pillaging Lydia. Lydian campaigns between 637 and 626 BC effectively halted this advance. The Cimmerian influence progressively weakened and the last recorded mention is in 515 BC.

==== Urartu ====
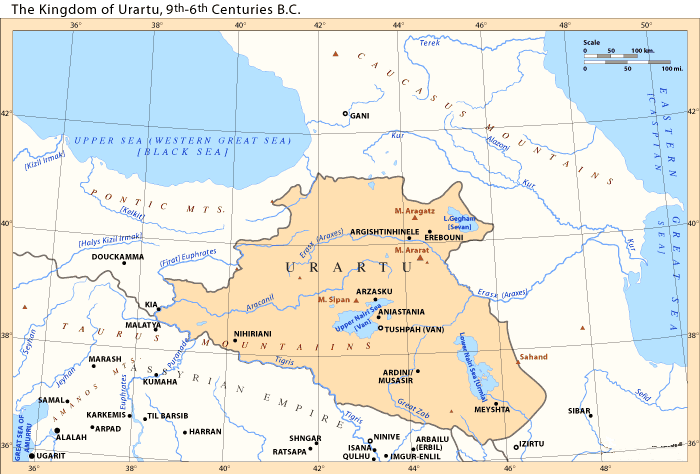
Urartu 9th–6th centuries BC

Urartu under Aramu 860–840 BC

Urartu (Nairi, or the Kingdom of Van) existed in north-east Anatolia, centered around Lake Van (Nairi Sea), to the south of the Cimmerians and North of Assyria. Its prominence ran from its appearance in the 9th century until it was overrun by the Medes in the 6th century.

Urartu is first mentioned as a loose confederation of smaller entities in the Armenian Highlands in the 13th to 11th centuries BC, but was subject to recurrent Assyrian incursions before emerging as a powerful neighbour by the 9th century BC. This was facilitated by Assyria's weak position in the 8th century BC. Urartu continued to resist Assyrian attacks and reached it greatest extent under Argishti I (c. 785–760 BC). At that time it included present day Armenia, southern Georgia reaching almost to the Black Sea, west to the sources of the Euphrates and south to the sources of the Tigris.

Following this Urartu suffered a number of setbacks. King Tiglath Pileser III of Assyria conquered it in 745 BC. By 714 BC it was being ravaged by both Cimmerian and Assyrian raids. After 645 BC Scythian attacks provided further problems for Urartu forcing it to become dependent on Assyria. However Assyria itself fell to a combined attack of Scythians, Medes and Babylonians in 612 BC. While the details of Urartu's demise are debated, it effectively disappeared to be replaced by Armenia. It was a Persian Satrapy for a while from the 6th century BC before becoming an independent Armenia. To this day Urartu forms an important part of Armenian nationalist sentiment.

==== Assyria ====
In the Iron Age Assyria extended to include southeastern Anatolia. Assyria, one of the great powers of the Mesopotamia region, had a long history from the 25th century BC (Bronze Age) until it final collapse in 612 BC at the end of the Iron Age. Assyria's Iron Age corresponds to the Middle Period (resurgence) and the Neo-Assyrian Empire in its last 300 years, and its territory centered on what is modern day Iraq.

Assyria influenced Anatolian politics and culture from when its traders first came into contact with Hattians in the late Bronze Age. By the 13th century BC Assyria was expanding to its northwest at the expense of the Hittites, and to the north at the expense of Urartu. Assyrian expansion reached its height under Tukulti-Ninurta I (1244–1208 BC), following which it was weakened by internal dissent. The collapse of the Hittie Empire at the end of the Bronze Age coincided with an era of renewed Assyrian expansion under Ashur-resh-ishi I (1133–1116 BC) and soon Assyria had added the Anatolian lands in what is now Syria to its empire. Tiglath-Pileser I (1115–1077 BC) then commenced incursions against the Neo-Hittite Phrygians, followed by the Luwian kingdoms of Commagene, Cilicia and Cappadocia.

With the death of Tiglath-Pileser I Assyria entered a period of decline during what is referred to as the Ancient Dark Ages (1075–912 BC) in the region that corresponded to the collapse of the Bronze Age. The last 300 years of the Assyrian Empire (Neo-Assyrian Empire) from 911 to 627 BC saw a renewed expansion including attacks on the Neo-Hittite states to its north and west. Ashurnasirpal II (883–859 BC) extracted tribute from Phrygia while his successor Shalmaneser III (858–823 BC) also attacked Urartu forcing his Anatolian neighbours to pay tribute. After his death the land was torn by civil war. Assyrian power continued to wax and wane with periodic incursions into the Anatolian lands. Sennacherib (705–681 BC) encountered and drove back a new force in the region, the Greeks who attempted to settle Cilicia. His successor Esarhaddon (680–669 BC) was responsible for the final destruction of Urartu. Ashurbanipal (669-627 BC) then extended Assyrian influence still further placing Caria, Cilicia, Lydia and Cappadocia into vassalage.

Assyria found its resources stretched to maintain the integrity of its vast empire and civil war again erupted following the death of Ashurbanipal. Vassal states stopped paying tribute, regaining independence. The weakened Assyrian state was now faced by a new threat, a coalition of Iranian peoples to its east and north, including Medes, Persians, Scythians and the Anatolian Cimmerians, who attacked Assyria in 616 BC. Ninevah, the capital, fell in 612 BC and the Assyrian Empire was finally swept away in 605 BC.

With the collapse of Assyria, ended not only the Iron Age, but also the era referred to as Pre-History, to make way for what has been variously described as Recorded History, or more specifically late Ancient History or Classical Civilisation. These terms are not precise or universal and overlap.

== See also ==
- History of Europe
- History of the Middle East
- Timeline of Middle Eastern history
- Anatolianism
- Ancient kingdoms of Anatolia
- Ancient Regions of Anatolia
- Ancient Near East
- History of archaeological research in Anatolia
