= Muwatalli =

Muwatalli or Mutawallis may refer to:

- Muwatalli I, 15th century Hittite ruler
- Muwatalli II (c. 1295–1272 BCE) Hittite emperor
- Muwatalli (Kummuh), 8th century Neo-Hittite ruler
- Muwatalli I (Gurgum), 10th century Neo-Hittite ruler
- Muwatalli II (Gurgum), 9th century Neo-Hittite ruler
- Muwatalli III (Gurgum), 8th century Neo-Hittite ruler
