= Battles of Alashiya =

Ancient battle

- Part of the Hittite Wars
| Date | 1275 BC – 1205 BC |
| Location | Off the coast of Alashiya (Cyprus) |
| Result | Hittite victory |

Belligerents
| Hittite Empire | Kingdom of Alashiya |

Commanders and leaders
| Hittite Kings | Unknown |

The Battles of Alashiya were a series of two naval engagements and one joint land and naval operation fought between the Hittite Navy and the Hittite Army of the Hittite Empire and the Alashiyan Navy and Alashiyan Army of the Kingdom of Alashiya (Cyprus); they took place between 1275 BC and 1205 BC.

== History ==
The Hittite Empire had laid claim to the Kingdom of Alashiya, located in modern-day Cyprus, since the late 14th century BC. In 1370 BC, the Hittites were attacked by the forces of Lukka and Kizzuwatna, later known in ancient history as the regions of Lycia and Cilicia. This attack provoked the Hittites into sending an invasion force against Alashiya on three occasions between 1275 BC and 1205 BC. The Hittite Navy engaged the Alashiyan fleet off the coast of Cyprus whilst the Hittite Army engaged Alashiyan land forces on the beach under the command of Great King Suppiluliuma II. The Battles of Alashiya were one of the earliest series of sea battles in recorded history; they resulted in a Hittite victory.

== Bibliography ==
- Connolly, Peter; Gillingham, John; Lazenby, John (2016). The Hutchinson Dictionary of Ancient and Medieval Warfare. Cambridge, England: Routledge. ISBN 9781135936747.
- Hill, George (2010). A History of Cyprus. Cambridge, England.: Cambridge University Press. ISBN 9781108020626.
- Middleton, Guy D. (2017). "7:The Hittites and the Eastern Mediterranean". Understanding Collapse Ancient History and Modern Myths. Cambridge, England.: Cambridge University Press. ISBN 9781316584941.
- Knapp, A. Bernard. (1985). "J Article Alashiya, Caphtor/Keftiu, and Eastern Mediterranean Trade: Recent Studies in Cypriote Archaeology and History". Journal of Field Archaeology. 12 (2).
