= Hittite navy =

Hittite Navy
- Active: ca. 16th–12th century BC
- Allegiance: Hittite Kingdom; Hittite Empire
- Garrison/HQ: Ura, Anatolia, Hittite Empire
- Engagements: Battles of Alashiya

The Hittite Navy was the main naval force of the Hittites from ca. 16th–12th century BC. The navy took part in three land and sea military campaigns of the Hittite Kingdom against the Kingdom of Alashiya between 1275 and 1205 BC. It was also one of the main adversaries of the Egyptian Navy.

== History ==
The Hittites were forced to take a serious interest in maritime affairs in the late 13th century BC as a result of increased coastal raiding, particularly by the Sea Peoples. The Hittite Kingdom was concerned with threats to its southern Mediterranean coast and further afield. The final monarch of the Hittite Empire was Suppiluliuma II, who is particularly known for commanding the Hittite fleet in the first recorded naval battle in history in 1210 BCE; this was a battle against the Alashiyan fleet and it led to a resounding Hittite victory. The battle was recorded in inscriptions of the Egyptian Pharaoh Ramses III; the inscriptions are the earliest references to a true sea battle.

== Battles ==
The navy was involved in a series of three military engagements known as the Battles of Alashiya, which included action at sea and on land between the Hittite Navy and Army against the Alashiyan Navy and Army. The battles took place between 1275 and 1205 BC.

== Bases and ports ==
=== Byblos and Tarsus ===
The ancient port city of Byblos fell under Hittite control during the reign of Suppiluliuma I (1344–1322 BC) following the expulsion of the Egyptians from the Levant. From c. 1700 to 1200 BC, the port city of Tarsus was both an important military base and trade centre of the Hittites.

=== Ugarit and Ura ===
Ugarit was an ancient port city in what is now northern Syria; it was located on the outskirts of modern-day Latakia. This port served for a period as an important naval base of the Hittite Kingdom. Ura was the major port of Anatolia to which grain and goods were brought from Egypt and Canaan via Ugarit for transshipment to the Hittite Empire. This was the main naval base from which the Hittite Navy conducted sea operations against Alashiya.

== Bibliography ==
- Bryce, Trevor. (2005). The Kingdom of Hittites, Oxford University Press. New York. ISBN 9780199281329.
- Connolly, Peter; Gillingham, John; Lazenby, John (2016). The Hutchinson Dictionary of Ancient and Medieval Warfare. Cambridge, England: Routledge. ISBN 9781135936747.
- Cotterell, Arthur (2006). Chariot: From Chariot to Tank, the Astounding Rise and Fall of the World's First War Machine. New York, New York, United States.: Overlook Press. ISBN 9781585678051.
- Edwards, I. E. S.; Gadd, C. J.; Hammond, N. G. L.; Sollberger, E. (2000). The Cambridge Ancient History (6 ed.). Cambridge, England: Cambridge University Press. ISBN 9780521082303.
- Emanuel, Jeff P. (September 2013). "War at Sea: The Advent of Naval Combat in the Late Bronze-Early Iron Age Eastern Mediterranean". academia.edu. Harvard, Massachusetts, United States: Harvard University.
- Finegan, Jack (2015). Light from the Ancient Past, Vol. 1: The Archaeological Background of the Hebrew-Christian Religion. Princeton, New Jersey, United States.: Princeton University Press. ISBN 9781400875153.
- Lendering, Jona (1995–2019). "Enkomi - Livius". www.livius.org. Leiden, Netherlands.: Livius. Retrieved 22 October 2019.
- Steiner, Margreet L.; Killebrew, Ann E. (2014). The Oxford Handbook of the Archaeology of the Levant: C. 8000-332 BCE. Oxford, England.: OUP Oxford. ISBN 9780199212972.
- Ward, William A.; Joukowsky, Martha (1992). The Crisis years: the 12th century B.C. : from beyond the Danube to the Tigris. Dubuque, Iowa, United States.: Kendall/Hunt Pub. ISBN 9780840371485.
- Yasur-Landau, Assaf (2014). The Philistines and Aegean Migration at the End of the Late Bronze Age. Cambridge, England.: Cambridge University Press. ISBN 9781139485876.
