= Tudḫaliya I =

1400s BC king of the Hittite Empire

Tudhaliya I

King of Hittite
- Reign: c. 1465 – c. 1440 BC
- Predecessor: Muwatalli I
- Died: c. 1440 BC
- Father: Kantuzzili

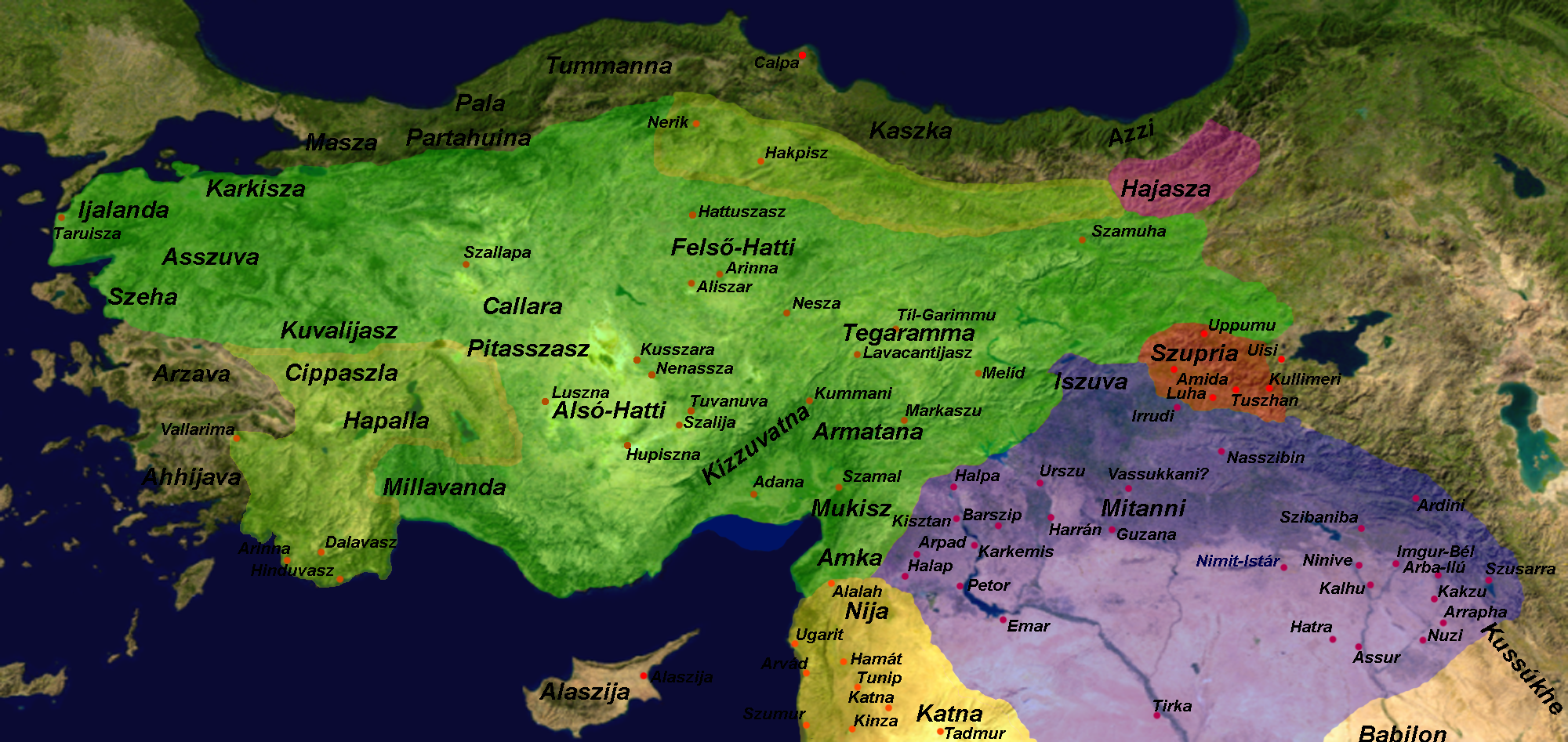
Anatolia during the reign of Tudhaliyas I and Arnuvandas I

Tudḫaliya I (sometimes considered identical with Tudḫaliya II and called Tudḫaliya I/II; died c. 1440 BC) was a Hittite great king in the 15th century BC, ruling perhaps c. 1465–c. 1440 BC.

== Identity ==
The numbering of Hittite kings named Tudḫaliya (Hittite: 𒌅𒌓𒄩𒇷𒅀, romanized: Tūdḫaliya) varies between scholars because of debate over the identity (or not) between the first two bearers of the name. This Tudḫaliya, now attested as the son of a certain Kantuzzili, succeeded Muwatalli I, after the latter was murdered by the officials Ḫimuili and Kantuzzili (not necessarily identical to Tudḫaliya's father). The same or a distinct Tudḫaliya was the father-in-law and predecessor of Arnuwanda I. Because of uncertainty, scholars are divided in the interpretation of the evidence. Many scholars envision a single Tudḫaliya (I or I/II), while others consider two separate kings, Tudḫaliya I and Tudḫaliya II.

The rationale for maintaining a distinction between the two is presented by Jacques Freu, who notes, inter alia, that Tudḫaliya I was the son of the non-reigning Kantuzzili, while Tudḫaliya II writes that he ascended the throne as a youth after his father's death; similarly, his sister Ziplantawiya was the daughter of a king. Additionally, Freu posits that the Sunassura Treaty between Hittite and Kizzuwatna reflects successive equal and unequal treaty arrangements under two different sets of kings on both sides, discerns three Tudḫaliyas as predecessors of Muršili II on his "cruciform seal," and argues that the Tudḫaliyas who engaged in repeated military action in Syria and in western Anatolia should be distinguished from each other to avoid an overly long reign.

The treatment below tentatively follows Freu's distinction of two 15th-century BC Hittite great kings named Tudḫaliya.

== Family ==
Tudḫaliya I was the son of a certain Kantuzzili, who is not known to have reigned or to have descended from an earlier Hittite monarch. Most scholars readily assume that this Kantuzzili was identical to the Commander of the Golden Squires Kantuzzili, who (together with his apparent brother, the Chief Cupbearer Ḫimuili) murdered the preceding king, Muwatalli I, and also with the general Kantuzzili, who assisted Tudḫaliya I in repelling a Hurrian invasion in support of Muwatalli's Commander of the Guard Muwa. On the other hand, Jacques Freu opposes the identification of Tudḫaliya's father Kantuzilli with the regicide Kantuzilli on the grounds of consistent contextual incompatibility between their attestations in the sources, but allows for the possibility that he is identical to the general who fought the Hurrians. Prior to the publication of the seal impression naming Kantuzilli as Tudḫaliya's father, Stefano De Martino suggested that the regicides Ḫimuili and Kantuzzili were Tudḫaliya's sons, who had placed their father on the throne. Onofrio Carruba and Freu propose that Tudḫaliya's mother was Walanni, attested in the royal offerings lists, and who might have been a daughter of the earlier king Zidanta II. It is also sometimes conjectured that Tudḫaliya was a grandson of the earlier king Huzziya II. Freu suggested that Tudḫaliya I was married to the obscure great queen Kattešḫapi attested at about this time, and was the father of a short-lived Ḫattušili II and the grandfather of Tudhaliya II.

If Tudḫaliya I and Tudḫaliya II were one and the same individual, his queen would have been Nikal-mati, his daughter Ašmu-Nikkal, and his son-in-law and successor, Arnuwanda I.

== Reign ==
Tudḫaliya I ascended the throne on the murder of his predecessor Muwatalli I, around 1465 BC. Tudḫaliya appears to have pardoned and purified the regicides, the brothers Ḫimuili and Kantuzzili, although their relation to him remains obscure. Muwattali's Commander of the Guard, Muwa, may have murdered a queen in retribution, and then attempted to stage a revolution with the help of Hurrians led by Kartašura. King Tudḫaliya and his general Kantuzzili (the regicide? the king's father?) defeated the enemy.

Having secured his eastern flank, Tudḫaliya I apparently decided to assert himself in the south. According to Freu's reconstruction of the evidence, he was responsible for the earlier, equal treaty between a Hittite king and Šunaššura I of Kizzuwatna, which allowed the king of Kizzuwatna full freedom to support the Hittite king against his enemies or remain neutral; the Hittites's primary objective at this point might have been securing unimpeded passage into Syria. Partly on the basis of the Middle Hittite language of the text, Freu argues that during the subsequent southern assertion of Hittite power, the Hittite king concluded the so-called Kuruštama Treaty with Egypt, whose king at that time, Thutmose III had been active in northern Syria and at one time reached the Euphrates River. Additionally, Freu believes that Tudḫaliya concluded unequal treaties with the petty rulers of Alalaḫ/Mukiš, Emar/Aštata, and Nuhašše, all now lost or very fragmentary, as in the case of his treaty with Tunip on the Orontes River. A much later source, the treaty between the Hittite great king Muršili II and his nephew, Talmi-Šarruma of Aleppo, related Tudḫaliya's conclusion of a treaty with Aleppo. When Aleppo abandoned its alliance with Tudḫaliya in favor of Mittani, Tudḫaliya defeated Aleppo and its Mittanian allies and destroyed the city.

If Tudḫaliya I and Tudḫaliya II were one and the same individual, the wars of Tudḫaliya II in western and northern Anatolia would also pertain to this reign. See Tudḫaliya II.

Hittite New Kingdom royal family tree according to Trevor Bryce

Kantuzilli (Note: Scholars have suggested that Tudhaliya I/II was possibly a grandson of the Hittite king Huzziya II; the first Tudhaliya is now known to be the son of Kantuzzili (Bryce 1997, p. 131 suggested Himuili, but the new edition, Bryce 2005, p. 122, indicated Kantuzzili).)
Tudhaliya I/II (Note: Bryce (1997) does not consider it clear whether Tudhaliya I/II was one king or two (p. 133); the link points to Tudhaliya II. Among those who identify distinct kings Tudhaliya I and Tudhaliya II, Freu (2007) has Kantuzzili—his son Tudhaliya I—his son Hattusili II—his son Tudhaliya II (p. 311).)	Nikkalmati (Note: Bryce (1997), p. 139.)
Arnuwanda I	Asmunikal
Hattusili II? (Note: The existence of Hattusili II is doubted by many scholars (Bryce 1997, pp. 153–154; Bryce 2005, p. 141). Among those who accept the existence of Hattusili II, Freu (2007), p. 311, has Tudhaliya I—his son Hattusili II—his son Tudhaliya II.)	Tudhaliya III (Note: Bryce (1997), p. 158.)	Daduhepa (Note: Bryce (1997), p. 172.)	Zida (Note: Bryce (1997), p. 174.)
Tudhaliya the Younger (Note: Bryce (1997), p. 168.)	Henti (1)	Šuppiluliuma I	(2) Tawananna (Note: Also known as Malnigal; daughter of Burnaburias II of Babylonia (Bryce 1997, p. 173).)
Arnuwanda II	Telipinu (Note: ‘Great priest’ in Kizzuwadna and king (lugal) of Aleppo (Bryce 1997, p. 174).)	Sarri-Kusuh (Note: King (lugal) of Carchemish.) (Note: Bryce (1997), pp. 174, 203–204.)	Zannanza (Note: Zannanza died on his way to Egypt to marry a pharaoh's widow, probably Ankhesenpaaten, the widow of Tutankhamun (Bryce 1997, pp. 196–198).)	Gassulawiya (Note: Bryce (1997), p. 227.) (1)	Mursili II	(2) Tanuhepa (Note: Bryce (1997), p. 230.)
Talmi-Sarruma (Note: Bryce (1997), p. 220.)	Sahurunuwa (Note: Bryce (1997), p. 222.)	Muwatalli II	Halpasulupi (Note: Haas (2006), p. 91.)	Massanauzzi (Note: Massanauzzi married Masturi, king of the Seha River Land (Bryce 1997, p. 313).)	Hattusili III (Note: Bryce (1997), p. 296.)	Puduhepa (Note: Puduhepa was the daughter of the Kizzuwadnan priest Pentipsarri (Bryce 1997, p. 273).)
Ini-Tesub (Note: Bryce (1997), pp. 346, 363.)	Urhi-Tesub	Kurunta (Note: King (lugal) of Tarhuntassa (Bryce 1997, p. 296); apparently later Great King of Hatti (Bryce 1997, p. 354).)	Nerikkaili (Note: Nerikkaili married a daughter of Bentesina, king of Amurru (Bryce 1997, p. 294).)	numerous daughters (Note: Two daughters of Hattusili III were married to the pharaoh Ramesses II; one was given the Egyptian name Ma(hor)nefrure. Another, Gassuwaliya, married into the royal house of Amurru. Kilushepa was married to a king of Isuwa. A daughter married into the royal family of Babylon. A sister of Tudhaliya IV married Sausgamuwa, king of Amurru after his father Bentesina. From Bryce (1997), pp. 294 and 312.) and sons (Note: Bryce (1997), p. 332.)	Tudhaliya IV (Note: Bryce (1997), p. 363. Tudhaliya IV probably married a Babylonian princess, known by her title of Great Princess (dumu.sal gal) (Bryce 1997, pp. 294, 331).)
Talmi-Tesub (Note: Bryce (1997), p. 363.)	Arnuwanda III (Note: Bryce (1997), p. 361.)	Suppiluliuma II (Note: Last documented Great King of the Land of Hatti.)
Kuzi-Tesub (Note: King and then Great King of Carchemish (Bryce 1997, pp. 384–385).)

- (1) = 1st spouse
- (2) = 2nd spouse
- Small caps indicates a Great King (LUGAL.GAL) of the Land of Hatti; italic small caps indicates a Great Queen or Tawananna.
- Dashed lines indicate adoption.
- Solid lines indicate marriage (if horizontal) or parentage (if vertical).

References:
- Trevor Bryce (1997). The Kingdom of the Hittites. Oxford, England: Clarendon Press.
- Trevor Bryce (2005). The Kingdom of the Hittites (new edition). Oxford, England: Clarendon Press.
- Trevor Bryce (2012). The World of the Neo-Hittite Kingdoms. Oxford, England: Oxford University Press.
- Jacques Freu (2007). Les débuts du nouvel empire hittite. Paris, France: L'Harmattan.
- Volkert Haas (2006). Die hethitische Literatur. Berlin, Germany: de Gruyter.
Notes:

Hittite New Kingdom royal family tree according to Jacques Freu
- Kantuzzili, (Note: Freu & Mazoyer 2007b: 24, 34, 45.) m. Walanni, perhaps daughter of Zidanta II (Note: Freu & Mazoyer 2007b: 24.)
  - TUDḪALIYA I (c.1465–1440 BC), (Note: Freu & Mazoyer 2007b: 24, 34, 45.) m. Kattešḫapi (?) (Note: Freu & Mazoyer 2007b: 63-68.)
    - ḪATTUŠILI II (c.1440–1425 BC), (Note: Freu & Mazoyer 2007b: 68.) m. Ašmu-Ḫeba (?) (Note: Freu & Mazoyer 2007b: 97.)
      - TUDḪALIYA II (c.1425–1390 BC), (Note: Freu & Mazoyer 2007b: 76.) m. Nikkal-mati (Note: Freu & Mazoyer 2007b: 96.)
        - Ašmu-Nikkal, (Note: Freu & Mazoyer 2007b: 96-99.) m. ARNUWANDA I (c.1390–1370 BC) (Note: Freu & Mazoyer 2007b: 96-99.)
          - TUDḪALIYA III/Tašmi-Šarri (c.1370–1350 BC), (Note: Freu & Mazoyer 2007b: 155.) m. (1) Šatandu-Ḫeba; (=?) (2) Tadu-Ḫeba (Note: Freu & Mazoyer 2007b: 161-162, considering the two names variants, referring to the same queen.)
            - Tulpi-Teššub the Younger (Note: Freu & Mazoyer 2007b: 155-156, additionally suggesting to identify him with Tudḫaliya the Younger.)
            - Tudḫaliya the Younger d.c.1350 BC (Note: Freu & Mazoyer 2007b: 199-200.)
            - Ḫenti, (Note: Freu & Mazoyer 2007b: 199-201.) m. ŠUPPILULIUMA I (c.1350–1319 BC), (Note: Freu & Mazoyer 2007b: 198-201.) who m. (2) Tawananna (Malnigal) of Babylon (Note: Freu & Mazoyer 2007b: 257.)
              - ARNUWANDA II (c.1319–1318 BC) (Note: Freu & Mazoyer 2007b: 211.)
              - Telipinu, Priest of Kizzuwatna, then vassal king of Aleppo, left descendants (Note: Freu & Mazoyer 2007b: 211, 273, 276.)
              - Piyaššili/Šarri-Kušuḫ, vassal king of Carchemish, left descendants (Note: Freu & Mazoyer 2007b: 275.)
              - Zannanza, (Note: Freu & Mazoyer 2007b: 278, 284.) betrothed to Ankhesenamun (?) (Note: Freu & Mazoyer 2007b: 284.)
              - MURŠILI II (c.1318–1295 BC), (Note: Freu & Mazoyer 2008: 19.) m. (1) Gaššulawiya; (Note: Freu & Mazoyer 2008: 62-65.) (2) Danu-Ḫeba (Note: Freu & Mazoyer 2008: 65-67.)
                - Ḫalpašulupi (Note: Freu & Mazoyer 2008: 87.)
                - MUWATALLI II (c.1295–1272 BC) (Note: Freu & Mazoyer 2008: 87.)
                  - MURŠILI III/Urḫi-Teššub (c.1272–1265 BC) (Note: Freu & Mazoyer 2008: 128-129, 153.)
                  - Kurunta/Ulmi-Teššub, vassal king of Tarḫuntašša, left descendants (Note: Freu & Mazoyer 2008: 165-169.)
                - Maššanauzzi, (Note: Freu & Mazoyer 2008: 87.) m. King Mašturi of the Šeḫa River Land (Note: Freu & Mazoyer 2008: 130, 222.)
                - ḪATTUŠILI III (c.1265–1240 BC), (Note: Freu & Mazoyer 2008: 87, 163.) m. Pudu-Ḫeba (Note: Freu & Mazoyer 2008: 149-150.)
                  - Nerikkaili, (Note: Freu & Mazoyer 2008: 164, 201.) m. daughter of King Bentešina of Amurru (Note: Freu & Mazoyer 2010: 65.)
                  - Ḫuzziya (Note: Freu & Mazoyer 2008: 165, 201-203.)
                  - TUDḪALIYA IV/Tašmi-Šarruma (c.1240–1215 BC) (Note: Freu & Mazoyer 2008: 166, 201; Freu & Mazoyer 2010: 20-21, rejecting the alternative reading "Ḫišmi-Šarruma.")
                    - ARNUWANDA III (c.1215–1210 BC) (Note: Freu & Mazoyer 2010: 177-178.)
                    - ŠUPPILULIUMA II (c.1210–1185 BC) (Note: Freu & Mazoyer 2010: 178-180.)
                      - TUDḪALIYA V (?) (Note: Freu 2010–2011: 190-191.)
                      - Eḫli-Nikkal, m. King Ammurapi of Ugarit (Note: Freu 2010: 189.)
                  - Ḫannuti (Note: Freu & Mazoyer 2008: 166, 201-202.)
                  - Ḫešni (Note: Freu & Mazoyer 2008: 166, 201, 203-204.)
                  - Kurakura (Note: Freu & Mazoyer 2010: 66.)
                  - Ḫišmi-Šarruma (Note: Freu & Mazoyer 2010: 67-68.)
                  - Maathorneferure, (Note: Freu & Mazoyer 2008: 166, 239.) m. King Ramesses II of Egypt (Note: Freu & Mazoyer 2008: 166, 239.)
                  - Unknown, m. King Ramesses II of Egypt (Note: Freu & Mazoyer 2008: 166, 240-241.)
                  - Gaššulawiya, (Note: Freu & Mazoyer 2008: 166, 210.) m. King Bentešina of Amurru (Note: Freu & Mazoyer 2008: 166, 210.)
                  - Kiluš-Ḫeba, (Note: Freu & Mazoyer 2008: 166.) m. King Ari-Šarruma of Išuwa (Note: Freu & Mazoyer 2008: 166; Freu & Mazoyer 2010: 67.)
              - Muwatti, m. King Mašḫuiluwa of Mira-Kuwaliya (Note: Freu & Mazoyer 2008: 69.)
              - Unknown, m. King Šattiwaza of Mittani (Note: Freu & Mazoyer 2007b: 289.)
          - Kantuzzili, Priest of Kizzuwatna (Note: Freu & Mazoyer 2007b: 148-149.)
          - Pariyawatra (Note: Freu & Mazoyer 2007b: 148.)
          - Mannini (Note: Freu & Mazoyer 2007b: 148.)
          - Tulpi-Teššub (Note: Freu & Mazoyer 2007b: 148.)
          - Ašmi-Šarruma
      - Ziplantawiya, Queen, (Note: Freu & Mazoyer 2007b: 96-98.) m. Unknown
        - Attāi (Note: Freu & Mazoyer 2007b: 97.)

A detailed and annotated genealogy of Hittite New Kingdom monarchs and their families, as reconstructed by Jacques Freu in his multi-volume work Les Hittites et leur histoire, presented as an alternative to the less detailed and sometimes differing reconstruction based on Trevor Bryce, The Kingdom of the Hittites.

References:
- Freu, Jacques, and Michel Mazoyer (2007b), Les débuts du nouvel empire hittite, Paris.
- Freu, Jacques, and Michel Mazoyer (2008), L'apogée du nouvel empire hittite, Paris.
- Freu, Jacques, and Michel Mazoyer (2010), Le déclin et la chute du nouvel empire hittite, Paris.
- Freu, Jacques (2010–2011), "Le vase d'argent du musée des civilisations anatoliennes d'Ankara et la fin de l'empire hittite," Talanta 42–43 (2010–2011) 185-192.

== In the Bible ==
A number of modern biblical scholars believe that either Tudhaliya I, or the proto-Hittite Tudhaliya, was the same individual as Tidal, king of Nations, who is mentioned in the Book of Genesis as having joined Chedorlaomer in attacking rebels in Canaan.

== Bibliography ==
- Beckman, Gary (1996), Hittite Diplomatic Texts, Atlanta.
- Beckman, Gary (2000), "Hittite Chronology," Akkadica 119-120 (2000) 19-32.
- Bryce, Trevor (2005), The Kingdom of the Hittites, Oxford.
- Carruba, Onofrio (2005), "Tuthalija 00I.* (und Hattusili II.)," Altorientalische Forschungen 32 (2005) 246-271.
- De Martino, Stefano (1991) "Himuili, Kantuzzili e la presa del potere da parte di Tuthaliya," Eothen 4 (1991) 5-21.
- Freu, Jacques, and Michel Mazoyer (2007a), Des origins à la fin de l’ancien royaume hittite, Paris.
- Freu, Jacques, and Michel Mazoyer (2007b), Les débuts du nouvel empire hittite, Paris.
- Klengel, Horst (1999), Geschichte des Hethitischen Reiches, Leiden.
- Kuhrt, Amélie (1995), The Ancient Near East c. 3000–330 BC, vol. 1., London.
- Otten, Heinrich (2000), "Ein Siegelabdruck Dutḫalijaš I.(?)," Archäologischer Anzeiger 2000: 375-376.
- Weeden, Mark (2022), "The Hittite Empire," in Karen Radner et al. (eds.), The Oxford History of the Ancient Near East, vol. 3 (From the * Hyksos to the Late Second Millennium BC), Oxford: 529-622.
- Wilhelm, Gernot (2004), "Generation Count in Hittite Chronology," in Herman Hunger and Regine Pruzsinszky, eds., Mesopotamian Dark Age Revisited, Vienna, 71-79.

Regnal titles
Preceded by Muwatalli I	King of Hittite c. 1465 – c. 1440 BC	Succeeded by
