= Hantili II =

- Predecessor: Alluwamna
- Successor: Zidanta II
- Parent(s): Alluwamna; Harapšeki
- Relatives: Zidanta II (possibly nephew)

Hantili II was a king in the Hittite Middle Kingdom, during the Late Bronze in the 15th century BC.

== Family ==
Hantili was a son of King Alluwamna, as attested in a land grant document from Alluwamna to his son, Hantili. His mother was likely Queen Harapšeki, the daughter of the King Telipinu. Hantili is mentioned on the offering lists right after Alluwamna. The later king Zidanta II was possibly Hantili's nephew.

== Reign ==
Hantili was the first great king in several generations to receive the royal blood from his father.

There is an alliance treaty with the king Paddatishu of Kizzuwatna with an unnamed Hittite king, who could be either Hantili II or his father Alluwamna. It is unclear, though, whether Hantili reigned right after Alluwamna, or if an interloper Tahurwaili reigned in between. It is also possible that Tahurwaili reigned after Hantili II. Most likely, though, that Tahurwaili reigned before Aluwamna, and Hantili was succeeded by Zidanta II

=== Endowment Inscription of Hantili II ===
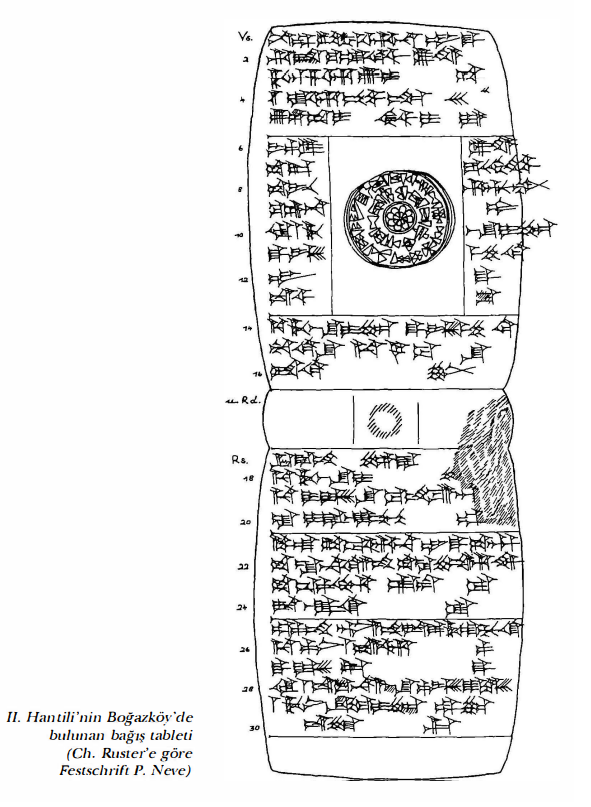
Endowment Tablet of Hantili II found in Boğazköy (Festschrift P. Neve according to Ch. Ruster)

Full text of Endowment Inscription of Hantili II from the Middle Hittite Age found in Boğazköy:

"The seal (sealed endowment document) of the Great King Tabana ("The Ruler"): The Great King received from the uriyannis on the right (sitting to the right of the king at the meeting or on the right wing in the battle formation) and from, the head of the guard detachment ("harpooner's head"), Haššuili. And gave it to Haššuili, the head of the guard detachment ("harpooner's head"), as a gift. In the future, no one will be able to claim (for this endowment) from Haššuili and his grandchildren! The word of the Great King Tabarna is of steel. It cannot be thrown aside and broken! Whoever changes it, they will be beheaded. This tablet was written in Hatti land by the clerk Hannikuili in front of Iškunaššu, the head of the palace boys, Šarpa and the commander of the army inspectors."

The inscriptions around the eight-leaf rosette in the middle on the king's seal in front of the tablet in English:

On the outer ring: "The seal of the Great King Tabarna Hantili."

In the inner ring: "Whoever changes his word (tablet) will die!"

The Great King Tabarna referred in this inscription is Labarna II (Hattusili I) and the word of the Great King Tabarna is Testament of Hattusili I.

== Sources ==
Regnal titles
Preceded by Alluwamna	Hittite king ca. 15th century BC	Succeeded by Zidanta II
