= Šuppiluliuma II =

King of the New Kingdom of the Hittite Empire

- Labarna
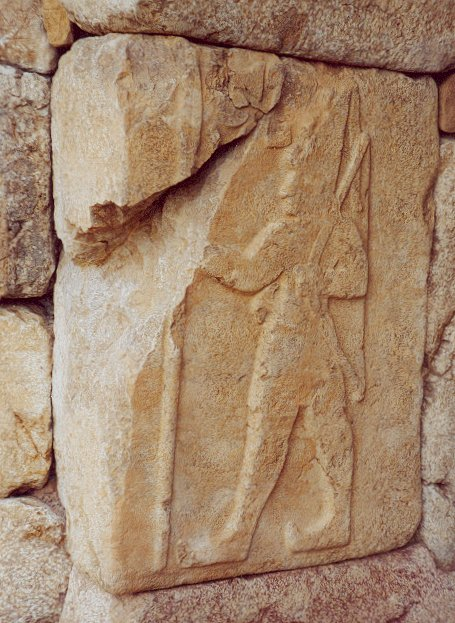
- Relief of Šuppiluliuma II in Ḫattuša

King of the Hittites
- Reign: 1207-1178 BC
- Predecessor: Arnuwanda III
- Successor: Tudḫaliya V (?)
- Born: Hattusas
- Died: 1178 BC; Hattusas
- Father: Tudḫaliya IV
- Mother: Unknown
- Religion: Hittite religion
- Cartouche

Šuppiluliuma II (/ˌsʌpɪlʌliˈuːmə/), the son of Tudḫaliya IV, was the last certain great king of the New Kingdom of the Hittite Empire, contemporary with Tukulti-Ninurta I of the Middle Assyrian Empire. A fleet under his command defeated the Cypriots, this event is also the first naval battle recorded in history. His reign began around 1207 BC and ended in 1178.

His name is usually spelled Šuppiluliama in contemporary primary sources, though modern scholars generally adopt the spelling used by his ancestor Šuppiluliuma I.

== Reign ==
A younger son of the Hittite great king Tudḫaliya IV, Šuppiluliuma II succeeded his elder brother, Arnuwanda III, on the throne in c. 1207 BC. The new king exacted oaths of allegiance from his court and subjects, advertising his loyalty to his deceased older brother and his own legitimacy in the absence of any heirs of his predecessor. Without providing specifics, the surviving texts suggest a context of disloyalty and potential challenges to the throne by members of the extended royal family.

Šuppiluliuma II inherited what seems to have been a precarious situation inside and outside his kingdom. A royal official (titled "king's son"), Piḫawalwi, was charged with writing to the vassal king of Ugarit, Ibiranu, to chastise him for failing to demonstrate his respects to Šuppiluliuma II. The vassal king of Carchemish, Talmi-Teššub, a member of the Hittite royal house, was apparently bound with a new treaty to the Hittite great king and left in charge of affairs in Syria; he would later supervise a divorce settlement between the great king's daughter Eḫli-Nikkal and King Ammurapi of Ugarit. Šuppiluliuma II corresponded with the contemporary king of Assyria, presumably Tukulti-Ninurta I, but the tablets are not well preserved.

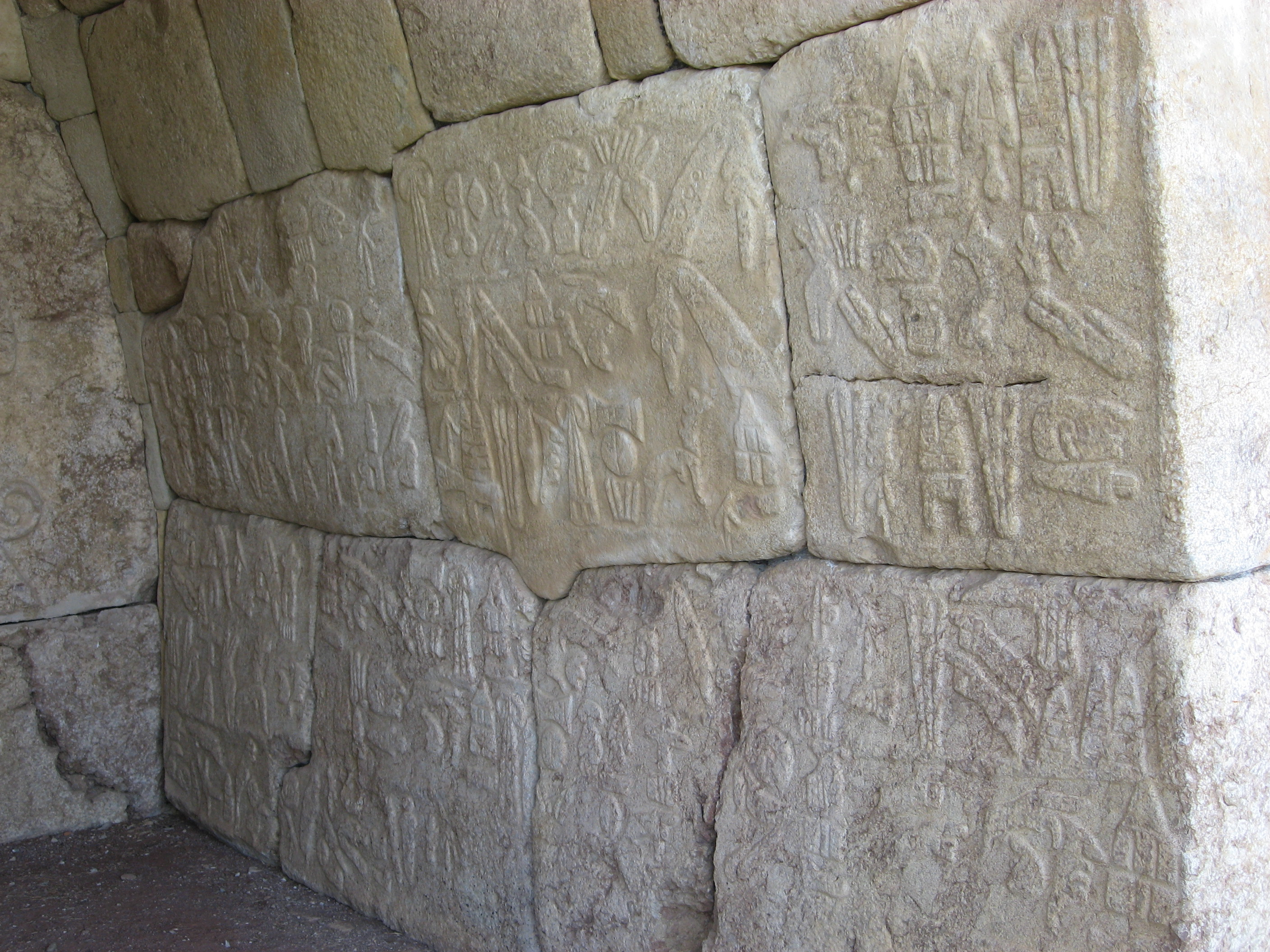
Chamber 2 built and inscribed by Suppiliuma II at Hattusa

Military campaigns during the reign of Šuppiluliuma II are known from two inscriptions in Hieroglyphic Luwian. They record wars against former vassal Tarḫuntašša, and against Alašiya (Cyprus). One inscription is found at the base of Nişantepe in the Upper City of Hattusa; the other is located on the northern corner of the East Pond (Pond 1), in what is known as Chamber 2. This served as a water reservoir for Hattusa and is described as a symbolic entrance to the Netherworld.

The Chamber 2 reliefs and inscription are historically important since they record the political instability which plagued Hatti during Šuppiluliuma II's reign. The inscriptions relate the great king's conquests of the lands of Wiyanawanda, Tamina, Maša (Mysia?), Lukka (Lycia and/or Lycaonia?), and Ikuna (Konya?), all of them in or near the territory of the Lukka in southwestern Anatolia. Following these successes, the inscription relates that Šuppiluliuma II attacked the hostile regime in Tarḫuntašša, a Hittite city that had briefly served as the Empire's political capital during the reign of Muwatalli II; Tarḫuntašša was defeated, sacked, and annexed by the great king. Inscriptions of an obscure great king Ḫartapu, son of a great king Muršili, with stylistic similarity to those of Tudḫaliya IV, found west of Konya, offer a possible identification for Šuppiluliuma II's enemy in Tarḫuntašša, if the Muršili in question could be equated with Muršili III (Urḫi-Teššub).

Reasserting Hittite central control over southern Anatolia and its coasts might have been more than a matter of pride, as suggested by references to urgent grain shipments from Merneptah, the king of Egypt, and from Mukiš in northern Syria. This and other indicators suggest a famine in Anatolia or more broadly the Eastern Mediterranean region in the late 13th century BC.

Following an earlier invasion of Alašiya (Cyprus) during the reign of his father, a fleet under the command of Šuppiluliuma II defeated either the Cypriots or a group of the so-called Sea Peoples who had established themselves on the island, the first recorded naval battle in history. According to some historians (Claude Schaeffer, Horst Nowacki, Wolfgang Lefèvre), this and following victories in Cyprus were probably won by using Ugaritic ships.

The Sea Peoples had already begun their advance along the Mediterranean coastline, apparently starting from the Aegean, and continuing all the way to Canaan, some of them settling in Philistia and at Dor. In the process, they seem to have taken Cilicia and Cyprus from the Hittites, cutting off their coveted trade routes. Based on records from Ugarit, the threat had originated in the west, and the Hittite king asked for assistance from Ugarit.

The enemy [advances(?)] against us and there is no number [...]. Our number is pure(?) [. . .] Whatever is available, look for it and send it to me.

Šuppiluliuma II was probably the ruler who abandoned the capital city of Hattusa, possibly contributing to the fall or disappearance of the Hittite kingdom. Some scholars indicate that Šuppiluliuma II's end is unknown or that he simply "vanished", while some claim he was killed during the sack of Hattusa in 1190 BC. The violent end of Hattusa as the Hittite capital is now doubted, and it is suspected that Šuppiluliuma II, like Tudḫaliya III before him, moved his residence and court elsewhere, perhaps to the southwest; unlike Tudḫaliya III, however, neither Šuppiluliuma II nor any of his potential successors ever reestablished themselves at Hattusa, and the Hittite Empire disappeared as such.

The Hittite kingdom collapsed, or at least underwent an irreversible negative transformation, at the end of the reign of Šuppiluliuma II. The reasons for this are unclear, and might have combined various natural phenomena (including droughts and earthquakes) with internal and external strife or political and military pressures. If Hattusa was not destroyed by its enemies at this point, but was only partly abandoned, a violent destruction of what remained might have happened a little later. Perhaps the Kaška, the traditional enemies of Hatti in the north, took-over the old Hittite capital. What was left of Hattusa was destroyed by fire, its site only re-occupied by a Phrygian fortress around 500 years later. Kuzi-Teššub, a ruler of Carchemish, would later assume the title of "Great King", because he was a direct descendant of Šuppiluliuma I.

== Possible successor ==
Although Šuppiluliuma II is generally considered the last great king of Hatti, it has been suggested that he had at least one successor, possibly his son, Tudḫaliya V. This hypothesis was proposed by Zsolt Simon after analyzing a Luwian inscription on a silver bowl in the Museum of Anatolian Civilizations in Ankara, its inscription reading in part

Asamaya, the Hittite, himself offered this bowl before King Maza-Karḫuḫa. When Tudḫaliya, the Labarna, defeated the land of Tarawazi/Tariwiza, that year he did it.

Simon determined that earlier proposals that identified the great king (Labarna) Tudḫaliya with any of the known great kings of that name were mistaken, due to the date of the inscription suggested by the epigraphy. Kings Tudḫaliya I through III were excluded due to the inscription's syllabic spelling, royal titulary formula, character inventory, Kings Tudḫaliya I and II by its language (Luwian), King Tudḫaliya IV by the syllabic spelling, the mention of a vassal king Maza-Karḫuḫa, and the formula Tudḫaliya Labarna, while any King Tudḫaliya of Carchemish was excluded by the title Labarna and the label "man of the Land of Hatti." Accordingly, Simon posited that the Labarna Tudḫaliya of the Ankara silver bowl would be best identified as the successor of Šuppiluliuma II, close in time but later than Tudḫaliya IV, and contemporary to Maza-Karḫuḫa in northern Syria (Carchemish?). As Šuppiluliuma II is known to have had a son (unnamed in the sources), it is natural to suppose that he would be named, or would assume the name, of his grandfather Tudḫaliya IV. Considering and dismissing Ḫartapu and the kings of Carchemish, Simon speculated on the possibility that the line of Hittite great kings survived as the Iron Age great kings of Tabal. This interpretation has found support from Jacques Freu.

== Family tree ==
Hittite New Kingdom royal family tree according to Trevor Bryce

Kantuzilli (Note: Scholars have suggested that Tudhaliya I/II was possibly a grandson of the Hittite king Huzziya II; the first Tudhaliya is now known to be the son of Kantuzzili (Bryce 1997, p. 131 suggested Himuili, but the new edition, Bryce 2005, p. 122, indicated Kantuzzili).)
Tudhaliya I/II (Note: Bryce (1997) does not consider it clear whether Tudhaliya I/II was one king or two (p. 133); the link points to Tudhaliya II. Among those who identify distinct kings Tudhaliya I and Tudhaliya II, Freu (2007) has Kantuzzili—his son Tudhaliya I—his son Hattusili II—his son Tudhaliya II (p. 311).)	Nikkalmati (Note: Bryce (1997), p. 139.)
Arnuwanda I	Asmunikal
Hattusili II? (Note: The existence of Hattusili II is doubted by many scholars (Bryce 1997, pp. 153–154; Bryce 2005, p. 141). Among those who accept the existence of Hattusili II, Freu (2007), p. 311, has Tudhaliya I—his son Hattusili II—his son Tudhaliya II.)	Tudhaliya III (Note: Bryce (1997), p. 158.)	Daduhepa (Note: Bryce (1997), p. 172.)	Zida (Note: Bryce (1997), p. 174.)
Tudhaliya the Younger (Note: Bryce (1997), p. 168.)	Henti (1)	Šuppiluliuma I	(2) Tawananna (Note: Also known as Malnigal; daughter of Burnaburias II of Babylonia (Bryce 1997, p. 173).)
Arnuwanda II	Telipinu (Note: ‘Great priest’ in Kizzuwadna and king (lugal) of Aleppo (Bryce 1997, p. 174).)	Sarri-Kusuh (Note: King (lugal) of Carchemish.) (Note: Bryce (1997), pp. 174, 203–204.)	Zannanza (Note: Zannanza died on his way to Egypt to marry a pharaoh's widow, probably Ankhesenpaaten, the widow of Tutankhamun (Bryce 1997, pp. 196–198).)	Gassulawiya (Note: Bryce (1997), p. 227.) (1)	Mursili II	(2) Tanuhepa (Note: Bryce (1997), p. 230.)
Talmi-Sarruma (Note: Bryce (1997), p. 220.)	Sahurunuwa (Note: Bryce (1997), p. 222.)	Muwatalli II	Halpasulupi (Note: Haas (2006), p. 91.)	Massanauzzi (Note: Massanauzzi married Masturi, king of the Seha River Land (Bryce 1997, p. 313).)	Hattusili III (Note: Bryce (1997), p. 296.)	Puduhepa (Note: Puduhepa was the daughter of the Kizzuwadnan priest Pentipsarri (Bryce 1997, p. 273).)
Ini-Tesub (Note: Bryce (1997), pp. 346, 363.)	Urhi-Tesub	Kurunta (Note: King (lugal) of Tarhuntassa (Bryce 1997, p. 296); apparently later Great King of Hatti (Bryce 1997, p. 354).)	Nerikkaili (Note: Nerikkaili married a daughter of Bentesina, king of Amurru (Bryce 1997, p. 294).)	numerous daughters (Note: Two daughters of Hattusili III were married to the pharaoh Ramesses II; one was given the Egyptian name Ma(hor)nefrure. Another, Gassuwaliya, married into the royal house of Amurru. Kilushepa was married to a king of Isuwa. A daughter married into the royal family of Babylon. A sister of Tudhaliya IV married Sausgamuwa, king of Amurru after his father Bentesina. From Bryce (1997), pp. 294 and 312.) and sons (Note: Bryce (1997), p. 332.)	Tudhaliya IV (Note: Bryce (1997), p. 363. Tudhaliya IV probably married a Babylonian princess, known by her title of Great Princess (dumu.sal gal) (Bryce 1997, pp. 294, 331).)
Talmi-Tesub (Note: Bryce (1997), p. 363.)	Arnuwanda III (Note: Bryce (1997), p. 361.)	Suppiluliuma II (Note: Last documented Great King of the Land of Hatti.)
Kuzi-Tesub (Note: King and then Great King of Carchemish (Bryce 1997, pp. 384–385).)

- (1) = 1st spouse
- (2) = 2nd spouse
- Small caps indicates a Great King (LUGAL.GAL) of the Land of Hatti; italic small caps indicates a Great Queen or Tawananna.
- Dashed lines indicate adoption.
- Solid lines indicate marriage (if horizontal) or parentage (if vertical).

References:
- Trevor Bryce (1997). The Kingdom of the Hittites. Oxford, England: Clarendon Press.
- Trevor Bryce (2005). The Kingdom of the Hittites (new edition). Oxford, England: Clarendon Press.
- Trevor Bryce (2012). The World of the Neo-Hittite Kingdoms. Oxford, England: Oxford University Press.
- Jacques Freu (2007). Les débuts du nouvel empire hittite. Paris, France: L'Harmattan.
- Volkert Haas (2006). Die hethitische Literatur. Berlin, Germany: de Gruyter.
Notes:

Hittite New Kingdom royal family tree according to Jacques Freu
- Kantuzzili, (Note: Freu & Mazoyer 2007b: 24, 34, 45.) m. Walanni, perhaps daughter of Zidanta II (Note: Freu & Mazoyer 2007b: 24.)
  - TUDḪALIYA I (c.1465–1440 BC), (Note: Freu & Mazoyer 2007b: 24, 34, 45.) m. Kattešḫapi (?) (Note: Freu & Mazoyer 2007b: 63-68.)
    - ḪATTUŠILI II (c.1440–1425 BC), (Note: Freu & Mazoyer 2007b: 68.) m. Ašmu-Ḫeba (?) (Note: Freu & Mazoyer 2007b: 97.)
      - TUDḪALIYA II (c.1425–1390 BC), (Note: Freu & Mazoyer 2007b: 76.) m. Nikkal-mati (Note: Freu & Mazoyer 2007b: 96.)
        - Ašmu-Nikkal, (Note: Freu & Mazoyer 2007b: 96-99.) m. ARNUWANDA I (c.1390–1370 BC) (Note: Freu & Mazoyer 2007b: 96-99.)
          - TUDḪALIYA III/Tašmi-Šarri (c.1370–1350 BC), (Note: Freu & Mazoyer 2007b: 155.) m. (1) Šatandu-Ḫeba; (=?) (2) Tadu-Ḫeba (Note: Freu & Mazoyer 2007b: 161-162, considering the two names variants, referring to the same queen.)
            - Tulpi-Teššub the Younger (Note: Freu & Mazoyer 2007b: 155-156, additionally suggesting to identify him with Tudḫaliya the Younger.)
            - Tudḫaliya the Younger d.c.1350 BC (Note: Freu & Mazoyer 2007b: 199-200.)
            - Ḫenti, (Note: Freu & Mazoyer 2007b: 199-201.) m. ŠUPPILULIUMA I (c.1350–1319 BC), (Note: Freu & Mazoyer 2007b: 198-201.) who m. (2) Tawananna (Malnigal) of Babylon (Note: Freu & Mazoyer 2007b: 257.)
              - ARNUWANDA II (c.1319–1318 BC) (Note: Freu & Mazoyer 2007b: 211.)
              - Telipinu, Priest of Kizzuwatna, then vassal king of Aleppo, left descendants (Note: Freu & Mazoyer 2007b: 211, 273, 276.)
              - Piyaššili/Šarri-Kušuḫ, vassal king of Carchemish, left descendants (Note: Freu & Mazoyer 2007b: 275.)
              - Zannanza, (Note: Freu & Mazoyer 2007b: 278, 284.) betrothed to Ankhesenamun (?) (Note: Freu & Mazoyer 2007b: 284.)
              - MURŠILI II (c.1318–1295 BC), (Note: Freu & Mazoyer 2008: 19.) m. (1) Gaššulawiya; (Note: Freu & Mazoyer 2008: 62-65.) (2) Danu-Ḫeba (Note: Freu & Mazoyer 2008: 65-67.)
                - Ḫalpašulupi (Note: Freu & Mazoyer 2008: 87.)
                - MUWATALLI II (c.1295–1272 BC) (Note: Freu & Mazoyer 2008: 87.)
                  - MURŠILI III/Urḫi-Teššub (c.1272–1265 BC) (Note: Freu & Mazoyer 2008: 128-129, 153.)
                  - Kurunta/Ulmi-Teššub, vassal king of Tarḫuntašša, left descendants (Note: Freu & Mazoyer 2008: 165-169.)
                - Maššanauzzi, (Note: Freu & Mazoyer 2008: 87.) m. King Mašturi of the Šeḫa River Land (Note: Freu & Mazoyer 2008: 130, 222.)
                - ḪATTUŠILI III (c.1265–1240 BC), (Note: Freu & Mazoyer 2008: 87, 163.) m. Pudu-Ḫeba (Note: Freu & Mazoyer 2008: 149-150.)
                  - Nerikkaili, (Note: Freu & Mazoyer 2008: 164, 201.) m. daughter of King Bentešina of Amurru (Note: Freu & Mazoyer 2010: 65.)
                  - Ḫuzziya (Note: Freu & Mazoyer 2008: 165, 201-203.)
                  - TUDḪALIYA IV/Tašmi-Šarruma (c.1240–1215 BC) (Note: Freu & Mazoyer 2008: 166, 201; Freu & Mazoyer 2010: 20-21, rejecting the alternative reading "Ḫišmi-Šarruma.")
                    - ARNUWANDA III (c.1215–1210 BC) (Note: Freu & Mazoyer 2010: 177-178.)
                    - ŠUPPILULIUMA II (c.1210–1185 BC) (Note: Freu & Mazoyer 2010: 178-180.)
                      - TUDḪALIYA V (?) (Note: Freu 2010–2011: 190-191.)
                      - Eḫli-Nikkal, m. King Ammurapi of Ugarit (Note: Freu 2010: 189.)
                  - Ḫannuti (Note: Freu & Mazoyer 2008: 166, 201-202.)
                  - Ḫešni (Note: Freu & Mazoyer 2008: 166, 201, 203-204.)
                  - Kurakura (Note: Freu & Mazoyer 2010: 66.)
                  - Ḫišmi-Šarruma (Note: Freu & Mazoyer 2010: 67-68.)
                  - Maathorneferure, (Note: Freu & Mazoyer 2008: 166, 239.) m. King Ramesses II of Egypt (Note: Freu & Mazoyer 2008: 166, 239.)
                  - Unknown, m. King Ramesses II of Egypt (Note: Freu & Mazoyer 2008: 166, 240-241.)
                  - Gaššulawiya, (Note: Freu & Mazoyer 2008: 166, 210.) m. King Bentešina of Amurru (Note: Freu & Mazoyer 2008: 166, 210.)
                  - Kiluš-Ḫeba, (Note: Freu & Mazoyer 2008: 166.) m. King Ari-Šarruma of Išuwa (Note: Freu & Mazoyer 2008: 166; Freu & Mazoyer 2010: 67.)
              - Muwatti, m. King Mašḫuiluwa of Mira-Kuwaliya (Note: Freu & Mazoyer 2008: 69.)
              - Unknown, m. King Šattiwaza of Mittani (Note: Freu & Mazoyer 2007b: 289.)
          - Kantuzzili, Priest of Kizzuwatna (Note: Freu & Mazoyer 2007b: 148-149.)
          - Pariyawatra (Note: Freu & Mazoyer 2007b: 148.)
          - Mannini (Note: Freu & Mazoyer 2007b: 148.)
          - Tulpi-Teššub (Note: Freu & Mazoyer 2007b: 148.)
          - Ašmi-Šarruma
      - Ziplantawiya, Queen, (Note: Freu & Mazoyer 2007b: 96-98.) m. Unknown
        - Attāi (Note: Freu & Mazoyer 2007b: 97.)

A detailed and annotated genealogy of Hittite New Kingdom monarchs and their families, as reconstructed by Jacques Freu in his multi-volume work Les Hittites et leur histoire, presented as an alternative to the less detailed and sometimes differing reconstruction based on Trevor Bryce, The Kingdom of the Hittites.

References:
- Freu, Jacques, and Michel Mazoyer (2007b), Les débuts du nouvel empire hittite, Paris.
- Freu, Jacques, and Michel Mazoyer (2008), L'apogée du nouvel empire hittite, Paris.
- Freu, Jacques, and Michel Mazoyer (2010), Le déclin et la chute du nouvel empire hittite, Paris.
- Freu, Jacques (2010–2011), "Le vase d'argent du musée des civilisations anatoliennes d'Ankara et la fin de l'empire hittite," Talanta 42–43 (2010–2011) 185-192.

== See also ==
- History of the Hittites

== Bibliography ==
- Astour, Michael, "New Evidence on the Last Days of Ugarit," American Journal of Archaeology 69 (1965) 253-258.
- Bryce, Trevor, The Kingdom of the Hittites, Oxford, 2005.
- Bryce, Trevor, The World of the Neo-Hittite Kingdoms, Oxford, 2012.
- Freu, Jacques, and Michel Mazoyer, Le déclin et la chute du nouvel empire Hittite, Paris, 2010.
- Freu, Jacques (2010–2011), "Le vase d'argent du musée des civilisations anatoliennes d'Ankara et la fin de l'empire hittite," Talanta 42–43 (2010–2011) 185-192.
- Güterbock, H.G., "The Hittite Conquest of Cyprus Reconsidered," Journal of Near Eastern Studies 26 (1967) 73-81.
- Haas, Volkert, Die hethitische Literatur, Berlin, 2006.
- Weeden, Mark, "After the Hittites: the kingdoms of Karkamish and Palistin in northern Syria," Bulletin of the Institute of Classical Studies 56:2 (2013) 1-21.
- Zsolt, Simon, "Die ANKARA-Silberschale und das Ende des hethitischen Reiches," Zeitschrift für Assyriologie 99 (2009) 247-269.

Regnal titles
Preceded by Arnuwanda III	Hittite king ca. 1207–?	Kingdom collapsed
