= Tahurwaili =

- Predecessor: Telepinu
- Successor: Alluwamna
- Relatives: Telipinu (cousin)

Tahurwaili was a king of the Hittites (Middle Kingdom), c. early 15th century BC (middle chronology) or mid 15th century BC (short chronology timeline). He was a cousin of the King Telipinu.

== Family ==
As a first cousin of Telipinu, must have been the son of one of Ammuna's brothers. This would have made him a direct male descendant of Zidanta I, so that his royal blood stemmed ultimately from Zidanta’s wife. It was tenuous, but the blood line was carried on.

== Reign ==
Tahurwaili is not mentioned in any of many "offering lists", but his existence is confirmed by the seal impressions found in Hattussa. The lack of evidence of his reign indicate his reign was short and perhaps omitted from lists of later rulers.

=== Chronology ===
He ruled sometime between Telepinu and Zidanta II, but otherwise the placement of his rule in the sequence of kings is uncertain. Often he is put after Aluwamna and even Hantili II, based on the style of his seal (see, for example, History of the Hittites), but such decision is speculative. Since he is mentioned in one of the Telepinu's letters (KUB 26:77) and is supposed to be Telepinu's cousin, it makes sense to assume that he ruled right after Telepinu. Here is the reasoning by Bin-Nun: we know that Aluwamna was exiled by Telepinu, so it would be difficult for him to come to the throne right after Telepinu's death. Therefore, it makes sense to assume that the usurper could come to power for a while. Putting Tahurwaili's reign after Hantili II (son of Aluwamna, who is son-in-law of Telepinu) means moving Tahurwaili at least two generations down the time line.

=== Treaty with Kizzuwatna ===
Tahurwaili is assumed to have made a parity treaty with Eheya of Kizzuwatna. Its terms were very similar to a treaty assumed to have been made by Hantili II and Paddatiššu of Kizzuwatna. These kings are usually assumed, because neither of the treaties name of a Hittite king.

== See also ==
- History of the Hittites

Regnal titles
Preceded by Telepinu	Hittite king c. early 15th century BC	Succeeded by Alluwamna
