= Alluwamna =

Hittite king

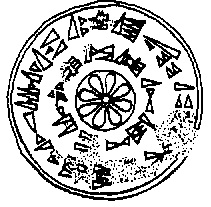
- Personal seal of King Alluwamna: "Seal of Great King, Tabarna, Alluwamna. He who alters (it) will die."
- Predecessor: Tahurwaili or Telipinu
- Successor: Hantili II
- Spouse: Harapšeki
- Children: Hantili II

Alluwamna was a king of the Hittites (Middle Kingdom) in the 15th century BC. He might be a successor of Telipinu as his son-in-law, after the reign of Tahurwaili.

== Family ==
Alluwamna married Harapšeki, daughter of Telipinu. Their son was Hantili II.

== Reign ==
Alluwamna's reign is attested by a seal (SBo I.86) which identifies him with the title "Great King". As a son-in-law of Telepinu (married to his first-rank daughter Harapšeki), Alluwamna would have been first in line for the throne. However, Tahurwaili banished him and his wife to Malitashkur (see KUB 26:77), and so it is possible that he did not come to the throne right after Telepinu's death, but rather after the reign of Tahurwaili, first cousin of Telipinu One text of Alluwamna records the granting of land to his son and likely successor Hantili II.

== See also ==
- History of the Hittites

== Sources ==
Regnal titles
Preceded by Tahurwaili or Telipinu	Hittite king ca. 15th century BC	Succeeded by Hantili II
