= List of Hittite kings =

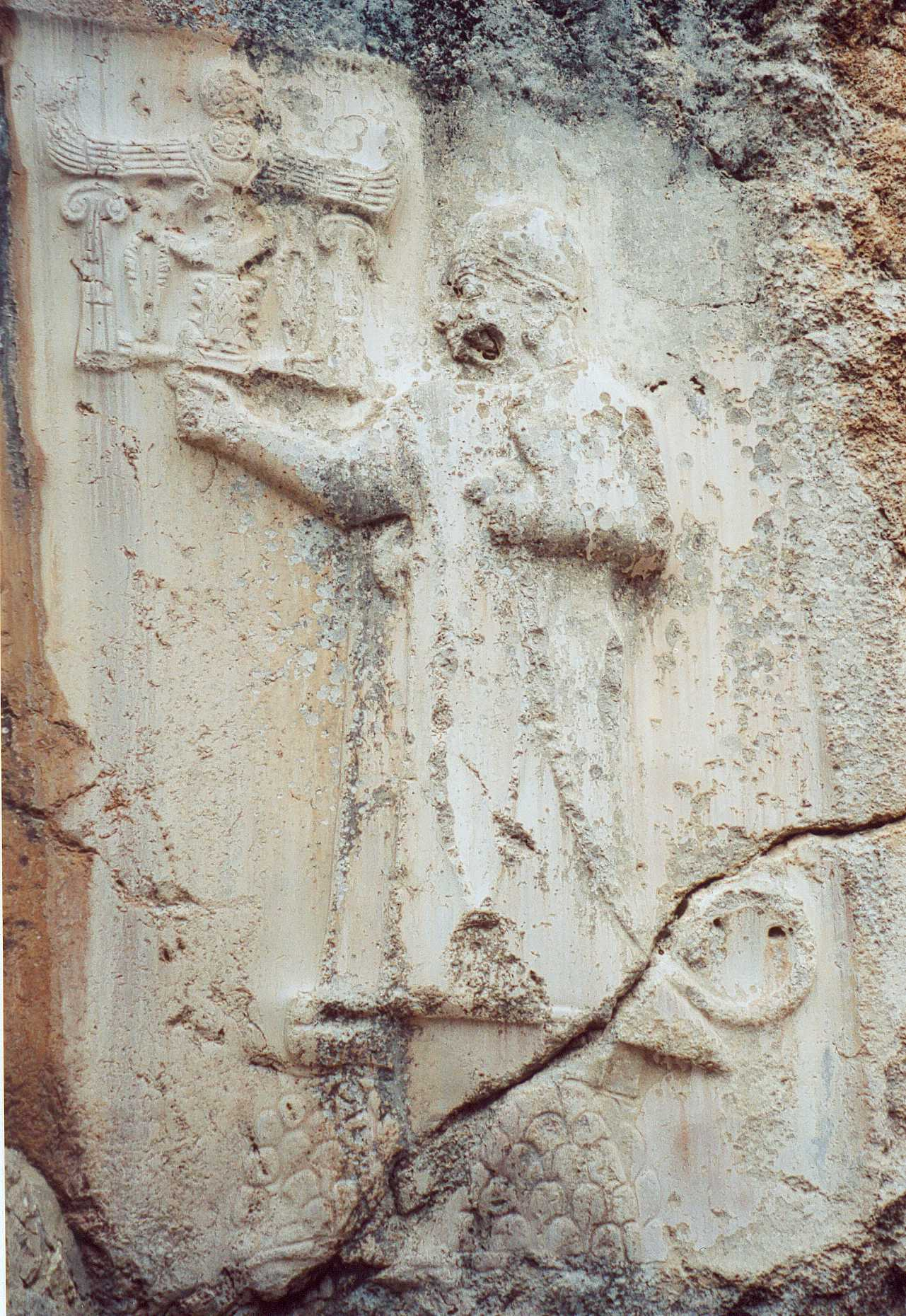
Tudḫaliya IV of the New Kingdom, r. c. 1245–1215 BC.

The dating and sequence of Hittite kings is compiled by scholars from fragmentary records, supplemented by the finds in Ḫattuša and other administrative centers of cuneiform tablets and more than 3,500 seal impressions providing the names, titles, and sometimes ancestry of Hittite kings and officials. Given the nature of the source evidence, reconstructions vary among scholars, and the dating or even existence, relationships and sequence of some kings is disputed at several point within Hittite history. The list below indicates instances of such debates, with references.

All dates in the list below should be considered approximate. Hittite Chronology is almost completely dependent on synchronisms with other ancient Near Eastern countries. Such synchronisms are few and usually open to interpretation. Muršili I is believed to have overthrown Samsu-ditāna, the last king of the Amorite dynasty of Babylon, but the dating of this event varies widely across chronological schemes based on interpretations of the records of observation of Venus during the reign of Samsu-ditāna's predecessor. These have resulted in several chronologies for Mesopotamia. In reference to the capture of Babylon by Muršili I, these are High (1651 BC), Middle (1595 BC), Low (1531 BC), and Ultra-Low (1499 BC), with additional variants such as the lower Middle Chronology (1587 BC). The distinction between these Mesopotamian chronological models disappears in the Late Bronze Age. Egyptian chronology is also subject to variant interpretations, resulting in three leading options, High (1304 BC), Middle (1290 BC), and Low (1279 BC), for the accession of Ramesses II, the contemporary of the Hittite kings Muwatalli II and Ḫattušili III. Assuming the preferred Low Chronology for Egypt, Ramesses II fought Muwatalli II at Kadesh in 1274 BC (Year 5), concluded a peace treaty with Ḫattušili III in 1259 BC (Year 21), and married the latter's daughter Maathorneferure in 1246 BC (Year 34).

On the Hittite side there are very few precise indicators. The "Apology" of Ḫattušili III indicates that his nephew and predecessor Muršili III reigned for 7 years. A text of Muršili II records an omen of the sun at the beginning of the campaign season against Azzi-Ḫayaša, in Year 9 or 10 of the reign. It is often considered to have been a solar eclipse, with current scholarly opinion divided between one on 24 June 1312 BC (which was visible from central Anatolia but seemingly late in the year, apparently adopted in the chronologies of Amélie Kuhrt and Trevor Bryce) and one on 13 April 1308 BC (which was earlier in the year but marginally visible, from eastern Anatolia, apparently adopted in the chronology of Jacques Freu).

The lists below use variations of the Mesopotamian Middle Chronology, the most generally accepted chronology of the Ancient Near East and the chronology that accords best with Hittite evidence. The variants represented below derive from three comprehensive reconstructions of the chronological sequence of rulers, by Amélie Kuhrt (1995), Trevor Bryce (2005), and Jacques Freu (2007). All regnal dates remain approximations.

== Old kingdom ==
Ruler	Reign (MC, Kuhrt, Bryce)	Reign (MC, Freu)	Lineage and notes
Ḫuzziya (I)	c. 1700 – c. 1680 BC	c. 1670 – c. 1650 BC	Father or father-in-law of Labarna; existence disputed.
Labarna I	c. 1680 – c. 1650 BC	c. 1650 – c. 1625 BC	Traditional founder of the royal line; son or son-in-law of Ḫuzziya; existence disputed.
Ḫattušili I (Note: Also known as Labarna II.)	c. 1650 – c. 1620 BC	c. 1625 – c. 1600 BC	Nephew of the wife of Labarna I
Muršili I	c. 1620 – c. 1590 BC	c. 1600 – c. 1585 BC	Grandson of Ḫattušili I. Sacked Babylon c. 1595 BC.
Ḫantili I	c. 1590 – c. 1560 BC	c. 1585 – c. 1570 BC	Brother-in-law of Muršili I
Zidanta I	c. 1560 – c. 1550 BC	c. 1570 – c. 1570 BC	Son-in-law of Ḫantili I
Ammuna	c. 1550 – c. 1530 BC	c. 1570 – c. 1550 BC	Son of Zidanta I
Ḫuzziya I (II)	c. 1530 – c. 1525 BC	c. 1550 – c. 1550 BC	Son of Ammuna (?)
Telipinu	c. 1560 – c. 1500 BC	c. 1550 – c. 1530 BC	Brother-in-law of Ḫuzziya I

== Middle kingdom (often not distinguished from Old kingdom) ==
Ruler	Reign (MC, Kuhrt, Bryce)	Reign (MC, Freu)	Lineage and notes
Alluwamna	c. 1500 – c. ? BC	c. 1530 – c. 1515 BC	Son-in-law of Telipinu
Ḫantili II	c. ? – c. ? BC	c. 1515 – c. 1505 BC	Son of Alluwamna
Taḫurwaili	c. ? – c. ? BC	c. 1505 – c. 1500 BC	Cousin of Telipinu; placement uncertain
Zidanta II (Note: Also known as Zidanza.)	c. ? – c. ? BC	c. 1500 – c. 1485 BC	Son of Ḫaššuili, a possible brother of Ḫantili II;
Ḫuzziya II (III)	c. ? – c. ? BC	c. 1485 – c. 1470 BC	Son or son-in-law of Zidanta II (?);
Muwatalli I	c. ? – c. 1430 /1400 BC	c. 1470 – c. 1465 BC	Unclear lineage

== New kingdom ==
Ruler	Cartouche	Reign (MC, Kuhrt)	Reign (MC, Bryce)	Reign (MC, Freu)	Lineage and notes
Tudḫaliya I		c. 1430/1420 – c. 1410/1400 BC	c. 1400 – c. ? BC	c. 1465 – c. 1440 BC	Son of Kantuzzili, descendant of Zidanta II (?) Identity disputed (= Tudḫaliya II ?)
Ḫattušili II		c. 1410/1400 – c. 1400/1390 BC	c. ? – c. ? BC	c. 1440 – c. 1425 BC	Son of Tudḫaliya I (?) Existence disputed
Tudḫaliya II		c. 1400/1390 – c. 1390/1370 BC	c. ? – c. ? BC	c. 1425 – c. 1390 BC	Son of Ḫattušili II (?) Identity disputed (= Tudḫaliya I ?)
Arnuwanda I		c. 1390/1370 – c. 1380/1355 BC	c. ? – c. ? BC	c. 1390 – c. 1370 BC	Adopted son and son-in-law of Tudḫaliya II
Tudḫaliya III (Note: Also known as Tašmišarri.)		c. 1380/1355 – c. 1370/1344 BC	c. ? – c. 1350 BC	c. 1370 – c. 1350 BC	Son of Arnuwanda I
Tudḫaliya the Younger (?)		(omits)	(omits)	(omits)	Son of Tudḫaliya III. Rule disputed.
Šuppiluliuma I		c. 1370/1344 – c. 1330/1322 BC	c. 1350 – c. 1322 BC	c. 1350 – c. 1319 BC	Adopted son and son-in-law of Tudḫaliya III Expanded the empire. Mentioned in the Amarna letters.
Arnuwanda II		c. 1330/1322 – c. 1330/1321 BC	c. 1322 – c. 1321 BC	c. 1319 – c. 1318 BC	Son of Šuppiluliuma I
Muršili II		c. 1330/1321 – c. 1295 BC	c. 1321 – c. 1295 BC	c. 1318 – c. 1295 BC	Son of Šuppiluliuma I
Muwatalli II (Note: Also known as Šarri-Teššub.)		c. 1295 – c. 1282/1272 BC	c. 1295 – c. 1272 BC	c. 1295 – c. 1272 BC	Son of Muršili II Fought at the Battle of Kadesh.
Muršili III (Note: Also known as Urhi-Teššub.)		c. 1282/1272 – c. 1275/1264 BC	c. 1272 – c. 1267 BC	c. 1272 – c. 1265 BC	Son of Muwatalli II
Ḫattušili III		c. 1275/1264 – c. 1245/1239 BC	c. 1267 – c. 1237 BC	c. 1265 – c. 1240 BC	Son of Muršili II Signatory of the Egyptian–Hittite peace treaty.
Tudḫaliya IV (Note: Also known as Tašmi-Šarruma.)		c. 1245/1239 – c. 1215/1209 BC	c. 1237 – c. 1209 BC	c. 1240 – c. 1215 BC	Son of Ḫattušili III Fought at the Battle of Nihriya.
Arnuwanda III		c. 1215/1209 – c. 1210/1205 BC	c. 1209 – c. 1207 BC	c. 1215 – c. 1210 BC	Son of Tudḫaliya IV
Šuppiluliuma II (Note: Also known as Šuppiluliama.)		c. 1215/1205 – c. ? BC	c. 1207 – c. ? BC	c. 1209 – c. 1185 BC	Son of Tudḫaliya IV Last known king before the Late Bronze Age collapse and end of the kingdom.

== Bibliography ==
- Bilgin, Tayfun (2018), Official and Administration in the Hittite World, Berlin.
- Beckman, Gary (2000), "Hittite Chronology," Akkadica 119-120 (2000) 19-32.
- Bryce, Trevor (2005), The Kingdom of the Hittites, Oxford.
- Freu, Jacques, and Michel Mazoyer (2007), Les débuts du nouvel empire hittite, Paris.
- Gautschy, Rita (2017), "Remarks Concerning the Alleged Solar Eclipse of Muršili II," Altorientalische Forschungen 44 (2017) 23-29.
- Höglmayer, Felix, and Sturt W. Manning, "A Synchronized Early Middle Bronze Age Chronology for Egypt, the Levant, and Mesopotamia," Journal of Near Eastern Studies 81 (2022) 1-24.
- Huber, Peter J. (2001), "The Solar Omen of Muršili II," Journal of the American Oriental Society 121 (2001): 640-644.
- De Jong, Teije, and Victoria Foertmeyer (2010), "A New Look at the Venus Observations of Ammisaduqa," Jaarbericht Ex Oriente Lux 42 (2010) 141-157.
- Kuhrt, Amélie (1995, reprinted 2020), The Ancient Near East: c.3000–330 BC, Volume One, Routledge.
- Wilhelm, Gernot (2004), "Generation Count in Hittite Chronology," in Hermann Hunger and Regine Pruzsinszky (eds.), Mesopotamian Dark Age Revisited, Vienna: 71-79.

== See also ==
- List of Neo-Hittite kings, for the rulers of the Neo-Hittite states, some of whom were direct descendants of the Hittite kings
  - The rulers of Carchemish in particular presented themselves as successors of the Hittite kings and ruled in northern Syria until defeated by the Assyrians in 717 BC.
- History of the Hittites
- Tawananna, for Hittite queens
