= Huzziya II =

- Predecessor: Zidanta II
- Successor: Muwatalli I
- Spouse: Šummiri

Huzziya II was a king of the Hittites. He was killed by Muwatalli I, who seized the throne and was possibly the Gal Mesedi of the royal bodyguard.

His wife was Queen Šummiri. Her name is associated with southern regions of the Hittite Empire; it is connectable with the name of Mount Summiyara and marked by the suffix -iyara, which primarily appears in the south.

== Notes ==
=== Bibliography ===
- Forlanini, Massimo (2010). "Kingship in Ḫatti during the 13th Century: Forms of Rule and Struggles for Power before the Fall of the Empire". In Cohen, Yoram; Gilan, Amir; Singer, Itamar; Miller, Jared L. (eds.). Pax Hethitica: Studies on the Hittites and Their Neighbours in Honour of Itamar Singer. Otto Harrassowitz Verlag. ISBN 978-3-447-06119-3.

Regnal titles
Preceded by Zidanta II	Hittite king ca. late 15th century BC	Succeeded by Muwatalli I
