= Muwatalli I =

- Cause of death: killed by his servants
- Predecessor: Huzziya II
- Successor: Tudhaliya I
- Spouse: Walanni
- Relatives: maybe Huzziya II

See also Muwatalli II

Muwatalli I (meaning "mighty") was a king of the Hittites.

== Biography ==
Muwatalli killed his predecessor Huzziya II. He was the Chief of the Royal Bodyguard (a position known as the Gal mesedi) of Huzziya, but later he killed him. He may have been Huzziya's younger brother.

Muwatalli's Chief of the Royal Bodyguard was called Muwa. Muwattalli himself was killed in a palace by Himuili, the Chief of the Palace Servants, and Kantuzili, the Overseer of the Gold Chariot Fighters.

His wife was called Walanni.

== Sources ==
Regnal titles
Preceded by Huzziya II	Hittite king ca. 1420 BC	Succeeded by Tudhaliya I (?)
