= Zidanta II =

- Predecessor: Hantili II
- Successor: Huzziya II
- Spouse: Yaya
- Relatives: Hantili II (possible uncle)

Zidanta II was a king of the Hittites (Middle Kingdom) in the 15th century BC.

== Life ==
He was probably a nephew of Hantili II and had a wife Yaya. Zidanta made peace through the means of a parity treaty with a ruler named Pilliya, his counterpart in Kizzuwatna. This was the last parity treaty ever signed by a Hittite king to a king of Kizzuwatna.

He was succeeded by Huzziya II although their relation remains unclear.

Regnal titles
| Preceded by Hantili II | Hittite king c. 15th century BC | Succeeded by Huzziya II |
