= Telipinu =

King of the Hittites c.1525–1500 BC

- King of the Hittites
- Reign: c. 1525–1500 BC
- Predecessor: Huzziya I
- Successor: Tahurwaili
- Spouse: Ištapariya
- Issue: Harapšeki

Telipinu was the last king of the Hittite Old Kingdom, reigning c. 1525–1500 BC in middle chronology. At the beginning of his reign, the Hittite Empire had contracted to its core territories, having long since lost all of its conquests, made in the former era under Hattusili I and Mursili I – to Arzawa in the West, Mitanni in the East, the Kaskians in the North, and Kizzuwatna in the South.

== Family ==
Telipinu was a son of Ammuna and brother-in-law of Huzziya I as a husband of Ammuna's daughter Ištapariya. His name was taken from the agricultural god Telipinu.

Alluwamna was a son-in-law of Telipinu, because he married Princess Harapšeki, and Telipinu was her father.

== Name ==
Telipinu's name is likely derived from the Hattic word "pinu", meaning a child. The Hattians were a non-Indo-European people living in Anatolia before the arrival of the Hittites, by whom they have been gradually absorbed.

== Reign ==
During Telipinu’s reign, Huzziya and his five brothers were killed. His son and wife were killed by Telepinu's rivals to the throne. The assassins were caught and sentenced to death, but Telepinu showed his desire to stop the bloodshed (many of his predecessors were assassinated or died mysteriously) and banished these assassins instead.

He was able to recover a little ground from the Hurrians of Mitanni, by forming an alliance with the Hurrians of Kizzuwatna; however, with the end of his reign, the Hittite Empire enters a temporary "Dark Ages", the Middle Kingdom, lasting around 70 years, when records become too scanty to draw many conclusions.

== Succession law ==
Telepinu is perhaps most famous for drawing up the Edict of Telepinu which dictated the laws of succession for the Hittite throne. It was designed to stop all the royal murders which had taken place in the previous decades, which had destabilised the empire and reduced the empire to only its heartland.

Let a prince – a son of the first rank only be installed as king! If a prince of the first rank does not exist, (then) let he who is a son of second rank become king. But if there is no prince, no male issue, (then) let them take an antiyant-husband for she who is a first rank daughter, and let him become king.

== Notes ==
Preceded by Huzziya I	Hittite king c. 1525–1500 BC	Succeeded by Tahurwaili
