= Ancient regions of Anatolia =

The following is a list of regions of Ancient Anatolia, also known as "Asia Minor." The names reflect changes to languages, settlements and polities from the Bronze Age to conquest by Turkic peoples.

== Bronze Age ==
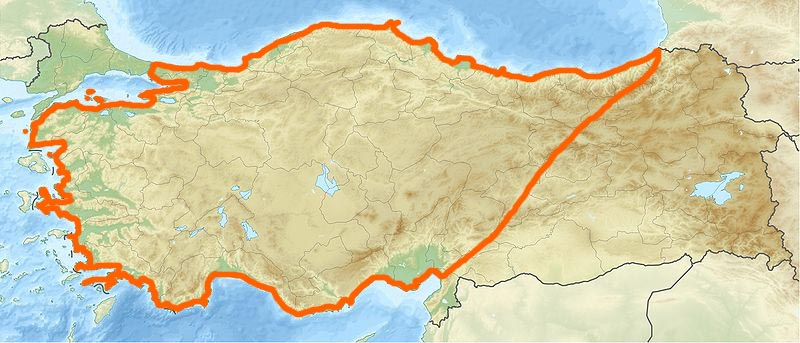
Region of Anatolia/Asia Minor Limits of Anatolia

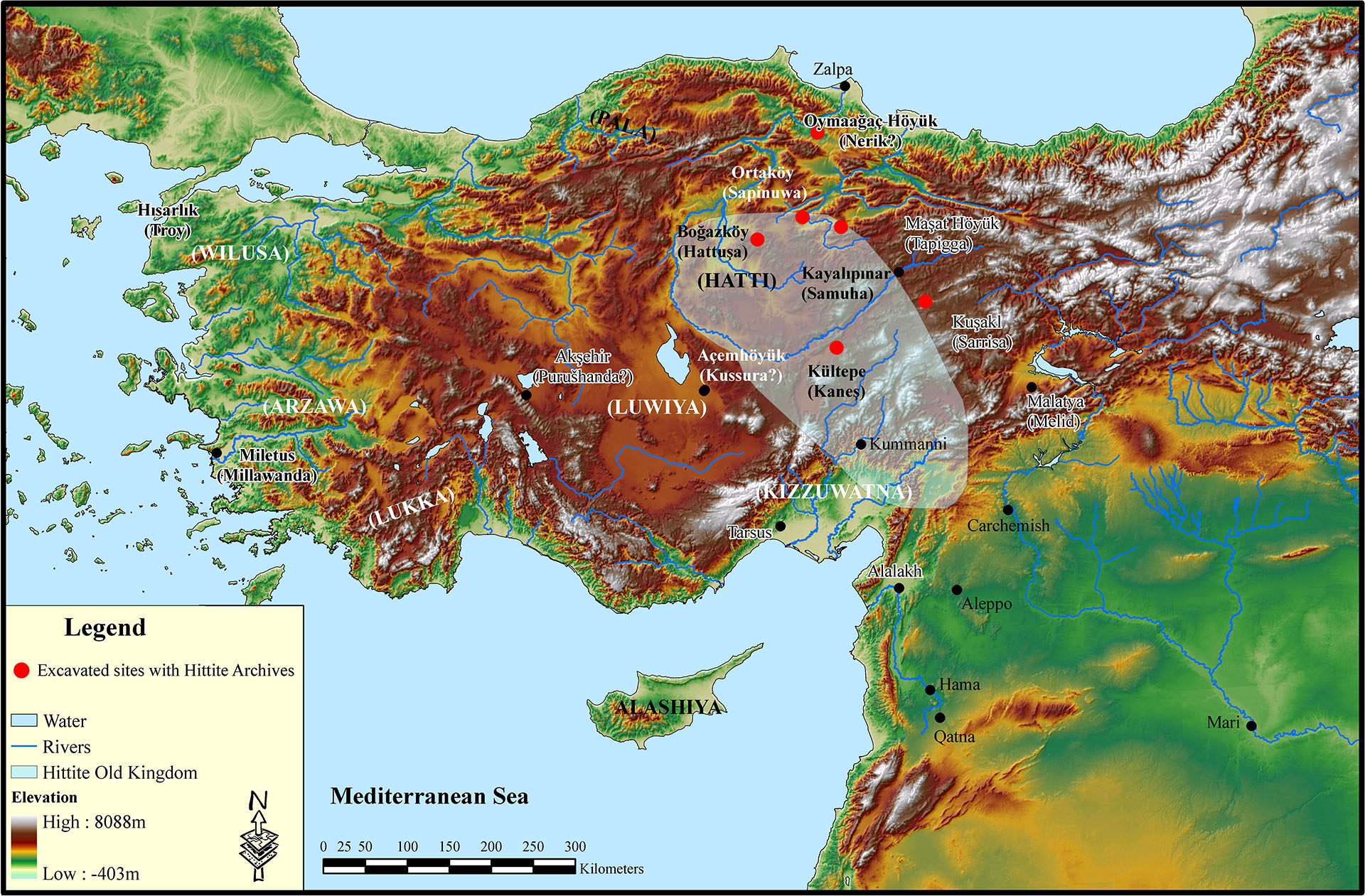
Late Bronze Age regions of Anatolia/Asia Minor (circa 1400 BC)

Late Bronze Age regions of Anatolia/Asia Minor (circa 1200 BC) with main settlements.

- Abbawiya
- Adadura
- Adana
- Aḫḫulla
- Alatra
- Ankuwa
- Apasa
- Arawana
- Arzawa
- Arziya
- Assuwa
- Dadassas
- Dunda
- Dura
- Durmitta
- Durpina
- Dalauwa
- Dankuwa
- Duruwaduruwa
- Gargiya
- Halluwa
- Haballa
- Harziuna
- Hatti
- Himmuwa
- Hulaya River Land
- Ḥuwallušiya
- Iksunuwa
- Istanuwa
- Isuwa
- Kalasma
- Land of the Kaskians
- Kassiya
- Kispuwa
- Kizzuwadna
- Kuruppiya
- Kussara
- Kuwaliya
- Lallupiya
- Lawazantiya
- Lazpa
- Lower Land
- Lukka
- Land of Luwiya
- Masa
- Mīllawānda
- Mira
- Mount Pahurina
- Nenisankuwa
- Neša
- Palà
- Parista
- Pasuhalta
- Pitassa
- Purushanda
- Sallusa
- Saḫiriya
- Seha River Land
- Siyanda
- Tarhuntassa
- Tumanna
- Tuwanuwa
- Troy
- Unaliya
- Upper Land
- Walma
- Wilusa
- Zallara
- Zalpa
- Zippasla

== Iron Age ==
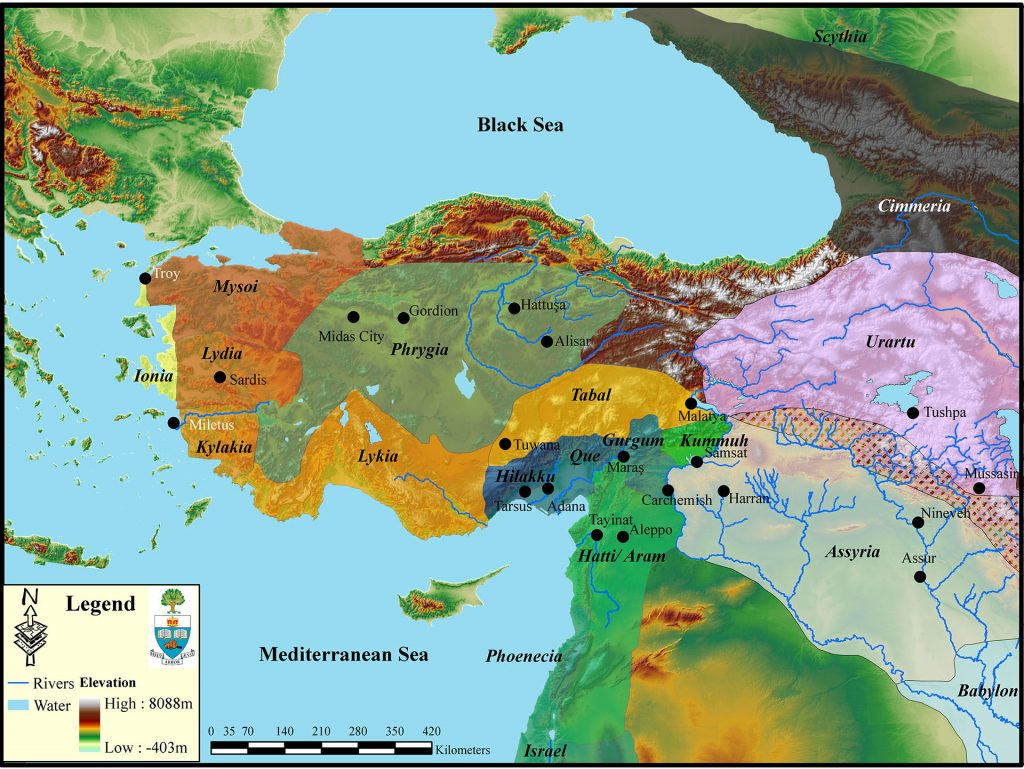
Iron Age Anatolia/Asia Minor

- Abydos
- Artis
- Assos
- Claros
- Colophon
- Cyme
- Erythrae
- Gordion
- Ḫilakku
- Ḫiyawa
- Kammanu
- Kummuh
- Larisa
- Lyrnessus
- Maeonia
- Percote
- Pergamon
- Phocaea
- Phrygia
- Samʾal
- Tabal
- Thebe
- Zeleia

== Classical ==
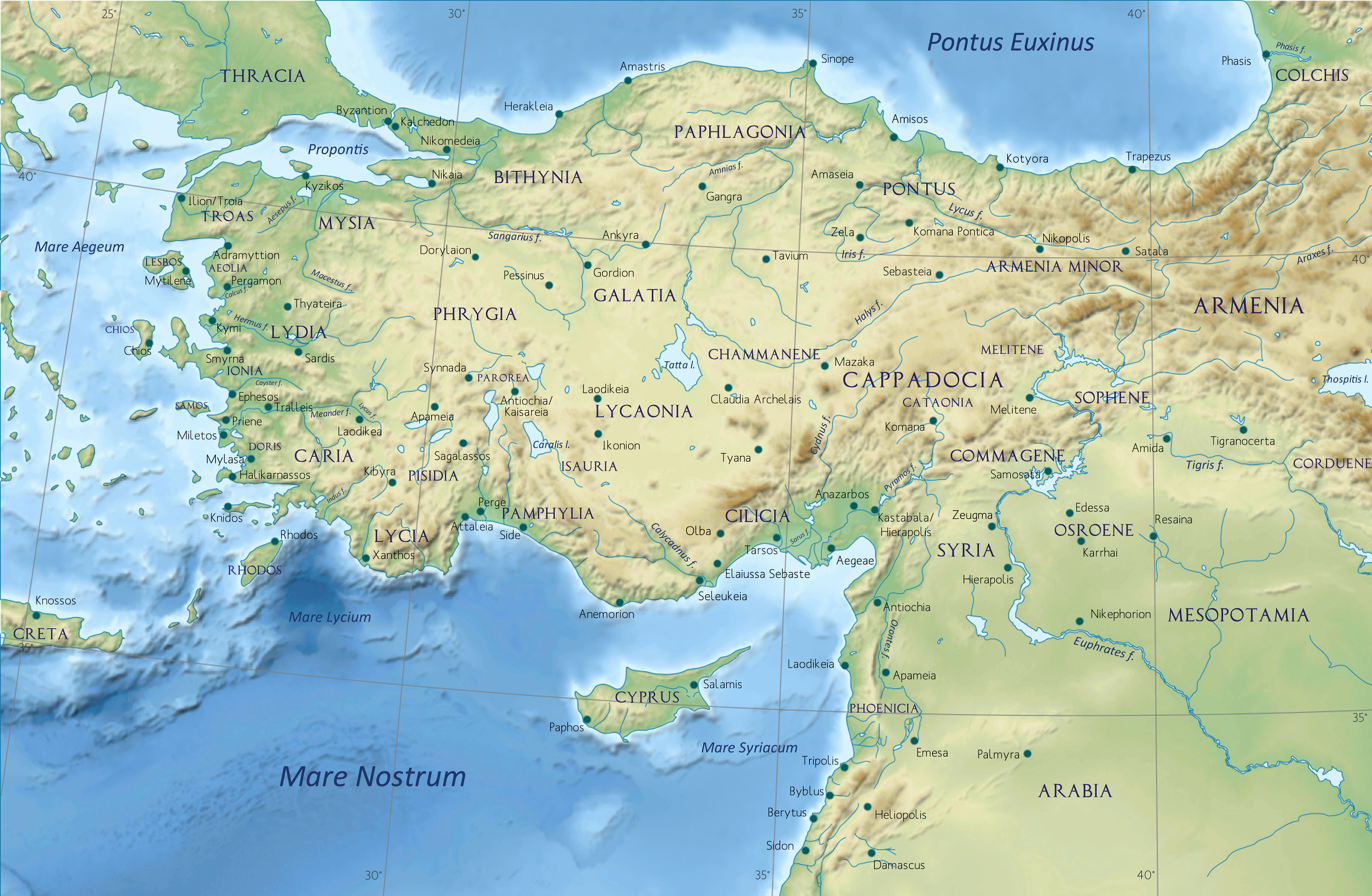
Anatolia/Asia Minor in the Greco-Roman period. The classical regions and their main settlements (circa 200 BC).

- Aeolis (named after the Aeolian Greeks that colonized the region)
  - Lesbos
- Armenia Minor (Armenia west of the Euphrates river, geographically in Anatolia) (roughly corresponding to ancient Azzi-Hayasa or Hayasa-Azzi)
  - Aeretice / Æretice
  - Aetulane / Ætulane
  - Orbalisene
  - Orbesine
  - Orsene
- Bithynia
  - Bithynia Proper (named after the Bithyni)
  - Cauconia (named after the Caucones or Kaukauni)
  - Mariandynia (named after the Mariandyni)
  - Salone / Salon (Bithynium or Bithynion was its main centre)
  - Tarsia
  - Tottaion
  - Thynia (named after the Thyni)
- Cappadocia (a significant part roughly corresponding to ancient "Land of Hatti" or Hatti) (name possibly derived from the Hittite Katta Peda- - Place Below or Place Down, from katta - below or down and peda - place; possible phonetic change - Katt(a)-peda > *Kat-peda > *Kat-pata > *Kat-patu + ka > Kat-patuka > *Kappaduka, borrowed to Greek as Kappadokía)
  - Bagadania / Bagadoania
  - Chammamene / Chammanene
  - Cataonia (broad sense) (During Achaemenid Persian Empire it was its own country or region and not part of Cappadocia)
    - Aravene
    - Cataonia / Cataonia Proper (narrow sense)
    - Lavinianesine / Lavianesine / Laviansene
    - Muriane / Murianune
  - Cappadocian Cilicia / Mazakene (where Mazaka or Caesarea Mazaka was located; it is today's Kayseri) (Nesa was close)
  - Garsaouritis / Garsauria
  - Melitene / Miletene (During Achaemenid Persian Empire it was its own country or region and not part of Cappadocia)
  - Morimene
  - Pteria
  - Saravene
    - Tarbasthena
  - Sargarausene
  - Tyanitis (after Tyana city) (roughly corresponding to ancient Tuwana / Tuwanuwa region)
- Caria
  - Peraea
- Cilicia
  - Cilicia Pedias / Cilicia Campestris (roughly corresponding to ancient Kizzuwadna)
    - Bryelice / Bryelica
  - Cilicia Trachaea / Cilicia Aspera (roughly corresponding to ancient Tarhuntassa) (later, Cilicia Aspera was included in Isauria)
    - Characine
    - Lalassis
    - Lamotis
    - Kennatis
    - Ketis
    - Selenitis (after Selinus city)
- Cyprus (roughly corresponding to ancient Alasiya, part or the whole island)
- Doris (named after the Dorian Greeks that colonized the region)
  - Cos
  - Doric Hexapolis
  - Rhodes
- Galatia (named after the Galatians, a Celtic people, that arrived in Central Anatolia by the early 3rd century BC, it didn't exist until then and was made by Galatian conquests of parts of Phrygia and Cappadocia)
  - Tolistobogii / Tolistobogioi subregion (Western Galatia) (where Gordion / Gordium, ancient Phrygian capital, was located, Pessinus was Tolisbogii capital)
    - Comata / Komata
    - Gordiana (was part of Phrygia until Galatian conquest, where Gordion / Gordium, ancient Phrygian capital, was located,)
    - Pancaleia / Pankaleia (was part of Phrygia until Galatian conquest)
    - Proseilemmene / Proseilimmene (was part of Phrygia until Galatian conquest)
  - Tectosages subregion (Central Galatia) (where Ancyra was located, today's Ankara)
    - Komodromos (was part of Cappadocia until Galatian conquest)
    - Sanisene (was part of Cappadocia until Galatian conquest)
  - Trocmi / Trokmoi subregion (Eastern Galatia) (where Tavium was located, close to ancient Hattusa)
    - Ximene (was part of Cappadocia until Galatian conquest)
- Ionia (named after the Ionian Greeks that colonized the region)
  - Chios
  - Icaria / Ikaria
  - Samos
- Isauria
- Lycaonia
  - Antiochiana
  - Axylos
- Lycia
  - Cabalia (roughly corresponding to ancient Kuwaliya)
  - Milyas (region dwelt by the Milyae that descend from the Solymi)
- Lydia / Maeonia
  - Katakekaumene
- Mysia (Coastal Phrygia) (also known as Phrygia Hellespontica, or as Phrygia Epictetus after the annexation by the Kingdom of Pergamum) (roughly corresponding to ancient Masa)
  - Phrygia Minor (northern part of Mysia)
    - Lentiana
  - Phrygia Maior / Phrygia Pergamene (southern part of Mysia)
    - Abrettene
    - Morene
    - Olympene
    - Teuthrania (sometimes included in Lydia) (Pergamon, that was capital of the Kingdom of Pergamon, was in this land)
- Pamphylia
- Paphlagonia (roughly corresponding to ancient Pala)
  - Blaene
  - Cimiatene
  - Domanitis (roughly corresponding to ancient Tumanna?)
  - Enetia / Henetia (named after the Eneti or Heneti)
  - Marmolitis
  - Pimolisene
  - Potamia
  - Timonitis
- Phrygia (Inland Phrygia)
  - Pacatiana / Phrygia Pacatiana (Western Phrygia)
    - Abbaitis (roughly corresponding to ancient Abbawiya or Appawiya)
    - Azanitis
  - Salutaris / Phrygia Salutaris (Eastern Phrygia)
- Pisidia
  - Paroreios / Parorea
- Pontus
  - Western Pontus (During Achaemenid Persian Empire it was part of Cappadocia) (roughly corresponding to ancient "Land of Zalpa", Zalpa or Zalpuwa was its main centre)
    - Chiliokomon
    - Camisene / Kamisene / Comisene
    - Colopene / Kolopene / Culupene / Calupene
    - Daximonitis
    - Diacopene
    - Gadilonitis / Gazelonitis
    - Limnia
    - Phanaraea
    - Phazemonitis
    - Saramene
    - Çarşamba Plain
      - Themiscyra
    - Tibarenia (named after the Tibareni, believed to be of Scythian origin by several classical authors like Herodotus, Xenophon and Strabo)
  - Eastern Pontus (roughly corresponding to ancient "Kaska Land", inhabited by the Kaska people) (inhabited by several peoples)
    - Byzeria (named after the Byzeres)
    - Chaldia (named after the Chalybes)
    - Macronia (named after the Macrones, ancestors of Mingrelians, part of the Zan)
    - Marria (named after the Marres)
    - Moschia (named after the Moschi or Moschoi, who may have been a northern branch of the Eastern Mushki and related to Mysians and Armenians)
    - Mossynoecia (named after the Mossynoeci)
    - Sannia (named after the Sanni, ancestors of the Zan, including Mingrelians and Lazs)
- Troas / Troad (sometimes included in Mysia)
  - Sigrene

=== Regions sometimes included in Anatolia ===
- Commagene (roughly corresponding to ancient Kummaha or Kummuh) (although it was on the south slope of the Taurus Mountains, it could be considered geographically in Anatolia / Asia Minor) (however it was administratively included in Roman Syria, far northern area, by the Roman Empire)
- Pieria (part of ancient Palistin) (although administratively in Roman Syria on the border area, it was on the west slope of the Amanus mountains, and sometimes it was included in Cilicia Pedias)

Note: Over time the regions did not always were the same and had the same size or the same borders and sometimes included different subregions, districts, divisions or parts or were united with others.

The names of many regions ended in "e" [e] that was the Eastern Greek (Attic Ionic Ancient Greek) equivalent to the Western Greek (Doric Greek) "a" [a] and also to the Latin "a" [a]. In Ancient Greek the "ph" represented the consonants p [p] and h [h] pronounced closely and not the f [f] consonant. In Ancient Greek the "y" represented the vowel [y] (ü) and not the semivowel [j] or the vowels [i] or [I].

== Byzantine Anatolian Themes (circa 1000 AD) ==
Byzantine Anatolian Themata circa 950 A.D

The themata of the East Roman Empire (Byzantine Empire), at the death of Basil II in 1025.

The Themata were combined Military and Administrative divisions of the Byzantine Empire (East Roman Empire) which replaced the Roman provincial system in the 7th-8th century and reached their height in the 9th and 10th centuries.

- Aegean Sea (was a naval theme which included the modern Greek islands of Lesbos, Chios and the Cyclades; the coastal areas of Troad and Mysia, as well as the Hellespont or modern day Dardanelles and the Gallipoli Peninsula. Main cities included Abydos (Hellespont), Cyzicus and Kallipolis).
- Anatolic Theme
- Armeniac Theme
- Bucellarian Theme
- Cappadocia (theme)
- Chaldia Theme
- Charsianon
- Cibyrrhaeot Theme
- Cyprus (theme) (the island could be included in Asia Minor or Anatolia, although not continental)
- Koloneia (theme)
- Lykandos
- Mesopotamia (theme)
- Opsikion
- Optimatoi
- Paphlagonia (theme)
- Iberia (which incorporated the historical region of Phasiane)
- Samos (theme)
- Sebasteia (theme)
- Seleucia (theme)
- Thracesian Theme

Ducates or Catepanates (combined Military and Administrative divisions of the Byzantine Empire (East Roman Empire) on border regions that included smaller Themata under the command of a Dux or Katepano)

- Ducate or Catepanate of Antioch
  - Kilikia (Cilicia)
- Ducate or Catepanate of Chaldia
  - Chaldia Theme
  - Koloneia (theme)
- Ducate or Catepanate of Mesopotamia
  - Melitene
  - Mesopotamia (roughly matching East Melitene)
  - Keltzine (on the western banks of the Euphrates, on the Anatolian side)

=== Regions sometimes included in Anatolia ===
- Euphrates Cities (Pareuphratídai Póleis) (roughly matching ancient Commagene and part of the Catepanate of Mesopotamia)

== See also ==
- Historical regions of Anatolia
- Geography of ancient Anatolia
- Neo-Hittite kingdoms
