= List of peninsulas of Turkey =

List of peninsulas in Turkey

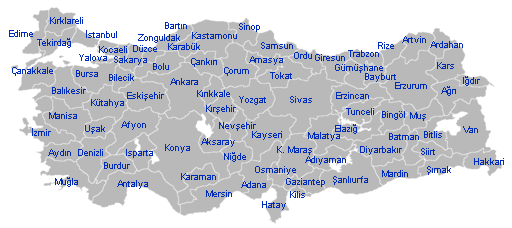

Turkey is primarily a country of two peninsulas: the Asiatic (southeastern) side is Anatolia, and the European (northwestern) side is Thrace on the Balkan Peninsula. On these two main peninsulas there are secondary peninsulas.

== The list of peninsulas ==
Peninsula	Main peninsula	Sea	Province
Boztepe	Anatolia	Black Sea	Sinop
Çatalca	Thrace	Between Black Sea and Marmara	İstanbul
Kocaeli	Anatolia	Between Black Sea and Marmara	İstanbul and Kocaeli
Armutlu	Anatolia	Marmara	Yalova
Kapıdağ	Anatolia	Marmara	Balıkesir
Gelibolu	Thrace	Between Marmara and Aegean Sea	Çanakkale
Biga (Troad)	Anatolia	Between Marmara and Aegean Sea	Çanakkale
Karaburun	Anatolia	Aegean Sea	İzmir
Güvercin	Anatolia	Aegean Sea	Aydın
Dilek	Anatolia	Aegean Sea	Aydın
Bodrum	Anatolia	Aegean Sea	Muğla
Küdür	Anatolia	Aegean Sea	Muğla
Datça (Reşadiye)	Anatolia	Aegean Sea	Muğla
Bozburun	Anatolia	Between Aegean and Mediterranean Seas	Muğla
Kapıdağ	Anatolia	Mediterranean Sea	Muğla
Çukurbağ	Anatolia	Mediterranean Sea	Antalya
Teke	Anatolia	Mediterranean Sea	Muğla, Antalya

== See also ==
- Bays of Turkey
- Capes of Turkey
- Geography of Turkey
