= Ḥuwallušiya (region) =

Bronze Age region of Anatolia

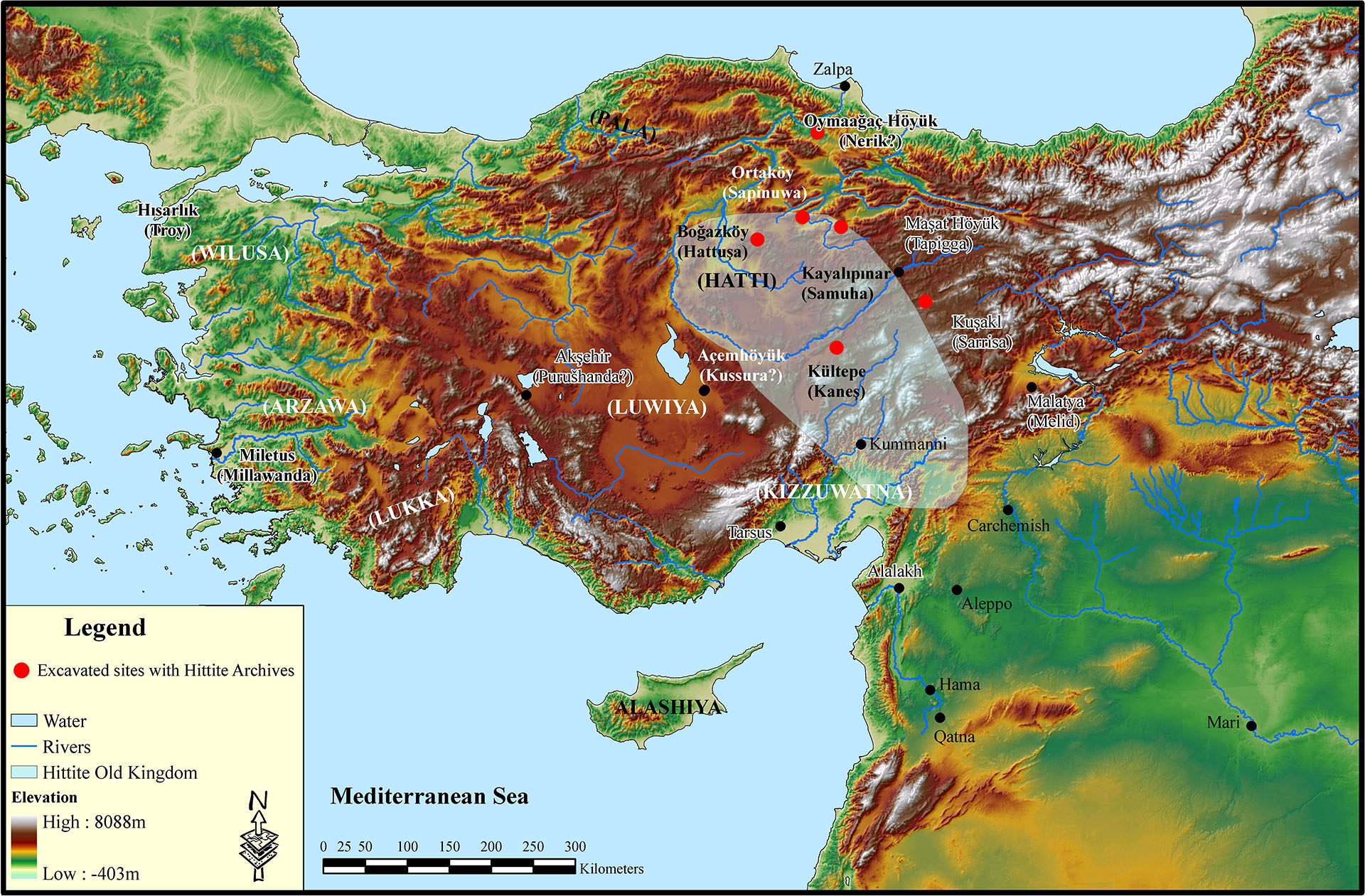
Land of Luwiya

Ḥuwallušiya was an ancient region of Anatolia located west of the Kızılırmak River and named in the Annals of Mursili, the Annals of Tudḫaliya and several itineraries of Hittite troop movements in the fifteenth century BC. It was one of the lands of the Assuwa coalition that opposed the Hittites.

== Geography ==
Huwallusiya was located "on the road to Arzawa," "not too far from the Kızılırmak" and was associated in itineraries with "Tummanda, Palunta, [Wal]wara, Hap[puriya], Paparzina, Ussuha...the city of Assuwa...Awina and [Wat]tarwa." A distinction has been made between Huwallusa (the town) and Huwallusiya (the surrounding countryside), with the former offering no resistance to the Hittites and the latter in active rebellion during the Assuwa campaign. Forlanini places it in western Phyrgia. Woudhuizen locates it much further west at modern Honaz, "along the Classical Lykos, a tributary of the Maiandros corresponding to the present-day Emir or Küçük Menderes and likely referred to in Hittite texts as the Astarpa. Oreshko associates it with Mount Hullusiwanda, "situated close to the lands Masa and Ardukka" in classical Mysia.

== History ==
Huwallusiya is named as a land to which the Hittite general Aranhapilizzi is sent by Mursili I toward the end of the sixteenth century BC as part of his northwest campaigns.

A hundred years later it is mentioned as one of the lands that comprised the Assuwa coalition, a military confederacy that opposed the Hittite army as it campaigned west of the Maraššantiya circa 1430 BC:

In the late 1300s during the reign of Arnuwanda I Huwalusa is grouped with Mount Iyawanda and Arziya.

== Popular culture ==
Huwallusiya is mentioned as Huwala and Huwali in fraudulent Luwian hieroglyphic inscriptions from Western Anatolia fabricated by Dutch archaeologist James Mellaart over the course of his career.

== See also ==
- Ancient regions of Anatolia
- Assuwa
