= Mount Pahurina =

Ancient region of Anatolia

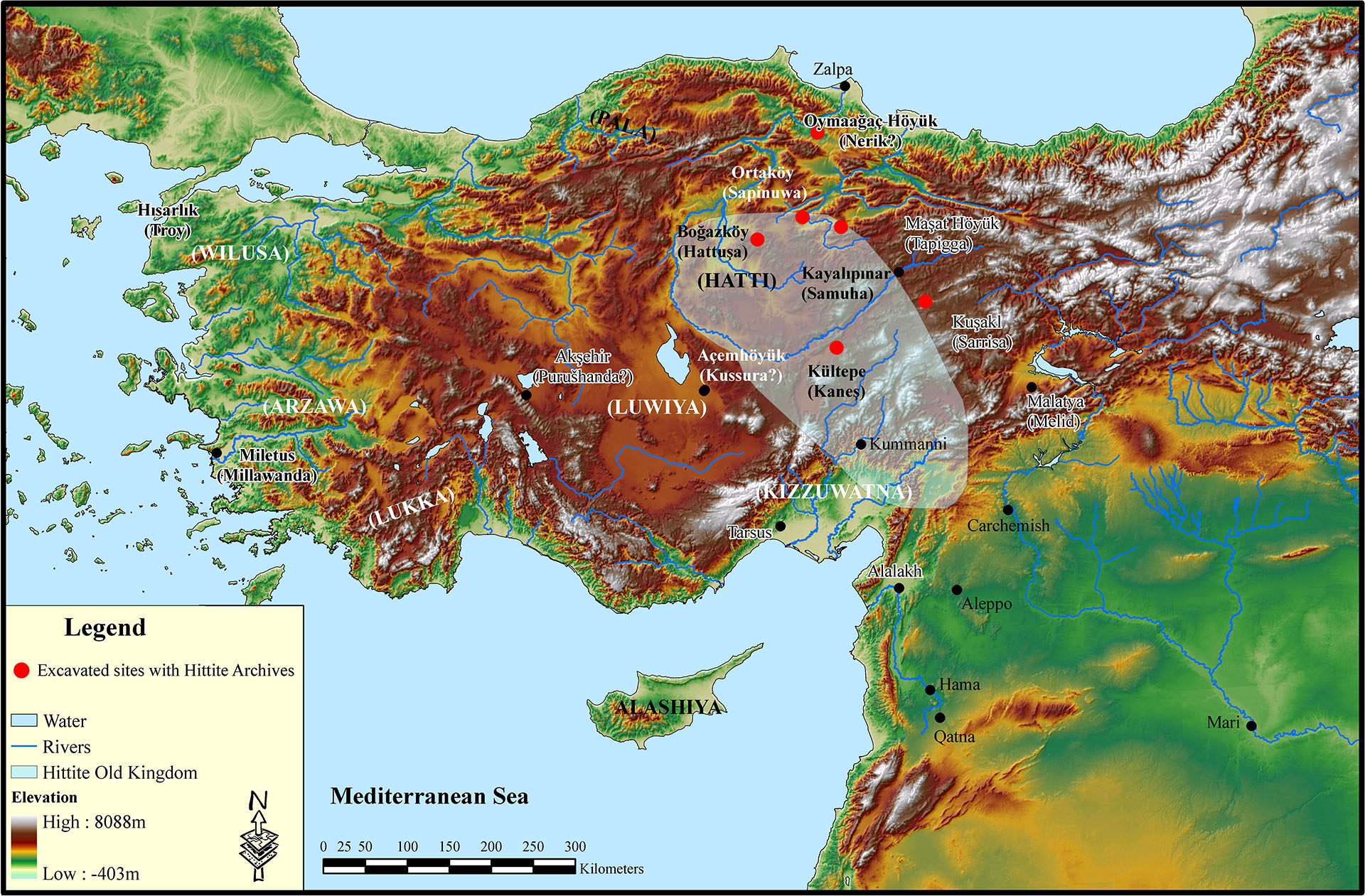
Land of Luwiya

Mount Pahurina was one of the lands of the Assuwa coalition in Bronze Age Anatolia that opposed the Hittites toward the end of the fifteenth century BC. It is named only in the Annals of Tudḫaliya, a text that chronicled the acts of Hittite monarch Tudḫaliya I.

== Etymology ==
The name derives from the Luwic root pāḫūr meaning "fire" and the denominal verb ina. The name suggests a volcano.

== Geography ==
The site of Mount Pahurina is undocumented. Mount Erciyes, Acıgöl–Nevşehir, Mount Hasan, Göllü Dağ, Karapinar Field and Mount Karadağ are the only volcanoes in central Anatolia that would appear to lay within reach of the Hittites during this era. The aftermath of a volcanic eruption is believed to be described in the Telipinu myth.

== History ==
Mount Pahurina is named as one of the lands that comprised the Assuwa coalition, a military confederacy of twenty-two towns that opposed the Hittite army as it campaigned across the Maraššantiya:

But when I turned back to Hattusa, then against me these lands declared war: [—]lugga, Kispuwa, Unaliya, [—], Dura, Halluwa, Huwallusiya, Karakisa, Dunda, Adadura, Parista, [—], [—]waa, Warsiya, Kuruppiya, [—]luissa, Alatra, Mount Pahurina, Pasuhalta, [—], Wilusiya, Taruisa. [These lands] with their warriors assembled themselves...and drew up their army opposite me...

As with most of the Assuwa coalition states, it is not attested anywhere else.

== See also ==
- Ancient regions of Anatolia
- Assuwa
