= Parista (region) =

Bronze Age region of Anatolia

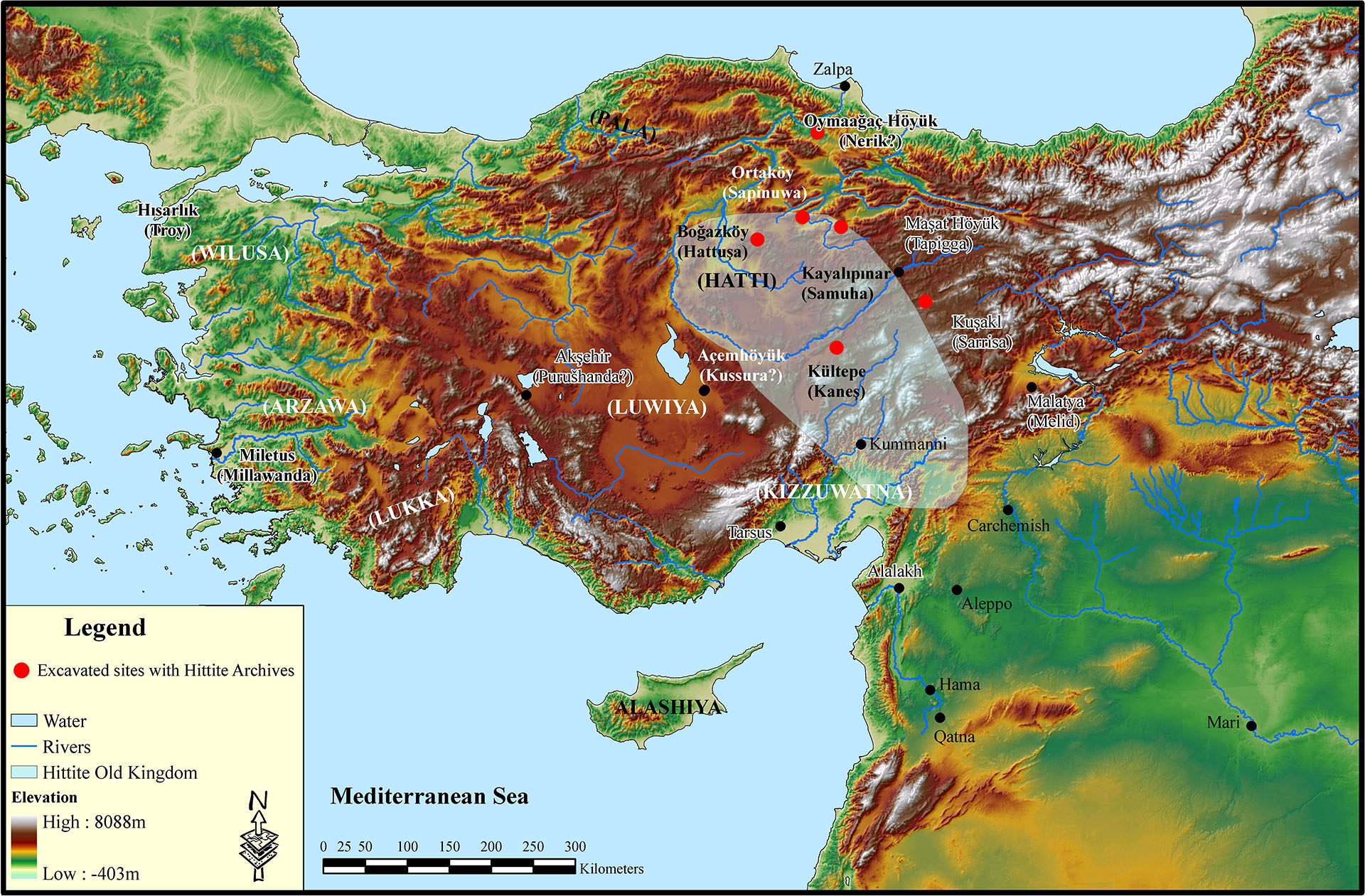
Land of Luwiya

Parista was one of the lands of the Assuwa coalition that opposed the Hittites in Bronze Age Anatolia. It is named only in the Annals of Tudḫaliya.

== Geography ==
The site has yet to be archaeologically located. Woudhuizen noted the similarity to the Mycenaean Greek topogram ku-pa-ri-so but did not suggest it denoted the same localization. It has been localized somewhere in the Ihlara valley, known as Greek: Περιστρημα, romanized: Peristrema).

== History ==
Parista is named as one of the lands that comprised the Assuwa coalition, a military confederacy of twenty-two towns that opposed the Hittite army as it campaigned across the Maraššantiya:

But when I turned back to Hattusa, then against me these lands declared war: [—]lugga, Kispuwa, Unaliya, [—], Dura, Halluwa, Huwallusiya, Karakisa, Dunda, Adadura, Parista, [—], [—]waa, Warsiya, Kuruppiya, [—]luissa, Alatra, Mount Pahurina, Pasuhalta, [—], Wilusiya, Taruisa. [These lands] with their warriors assembled themselves...and drew up their army opposite me...

Parista does not appear to be attested anywhere else. See generally the debate concerning the location of Assuwa.

== See also ==
- Ancient regions of Anatolia
- Assuwa
