= Gulfs of Turkey =

List of gulfs in Turkey

Turkey straddles two peninsulas: Anatolia in Asia and Thrace in Europe. The surrounding seas are the Black Sea, Sea of Marmara, Aegean Sea and Mediterranean Sea. But the number of gulfs in the north (Black Sea) and the south (Mediterranean) is not high, because the mountain ranges lie more or less parallel to the coastline both in the north and in the south . The majority of bays are on the west (Aegean and Marmara), where the mountain ranges are perpendicular to the coastline.

== Major gulfs ==
Bay	Main peninsula	Sea	Province
Hamsilos	Anatolia	Black Sea	Sinop
İzmit	Anatolia	Marmara	Kocaeli
Gemlik	Anatolia	Marmara	Bursa
Bandırma	Anatolia	Marmara	Balıkesir
Erdek	Anatolia	Marmara	Balıkesir
Saros	Thrace	Aegean	Çanakkale
Edremit	Anatolia	Aegean	Balıkesir
Dikili	Anatolia	Aegean	İzmir
Çandarlı	Anatolia	Aegean	İzmir
İzmir	Anatolia	Aegean	İzmir
Gülbahçe	Anatolia	Aegean	İzmir
Gerence	Anatolia	Aegean	İzmir
Sığacık	Anatolia	Aegean	İzmir
Kuşadası	Anatolia	Aegean	Aydın
Kazıklı	Anatolia	Aegean	Muğla
Güllük (Mandalya)	Anatolia	Aegean	Muğla
Gökova	Anatolia	Aegean	Muğla
Hisarönü	Anatolia	Aegean	Muğla
Sömbeki	Anatolia	Aegean	Muğla
Marmaris	Anatolia	Mediterranean	Muğla
Karaağaç	Anatolia	Mediterranean	Muğla
Fethiye	Anatolia	Mediterranean	Muğla
Finike	Anatolia	Mediterranean	Antalya
Antalya	Anatolia	Mediterranean	Antalya
Mersin	Anatolia	Mediterranean	Mersin
İskenderun	Anatolia	Mediterranean	Hatay

== See also ==
- Capes of Turkey
- Peninsulas of Turkey
- Geography of Turkey
