= Dura (region) =

Bronze Age region of Anatolia

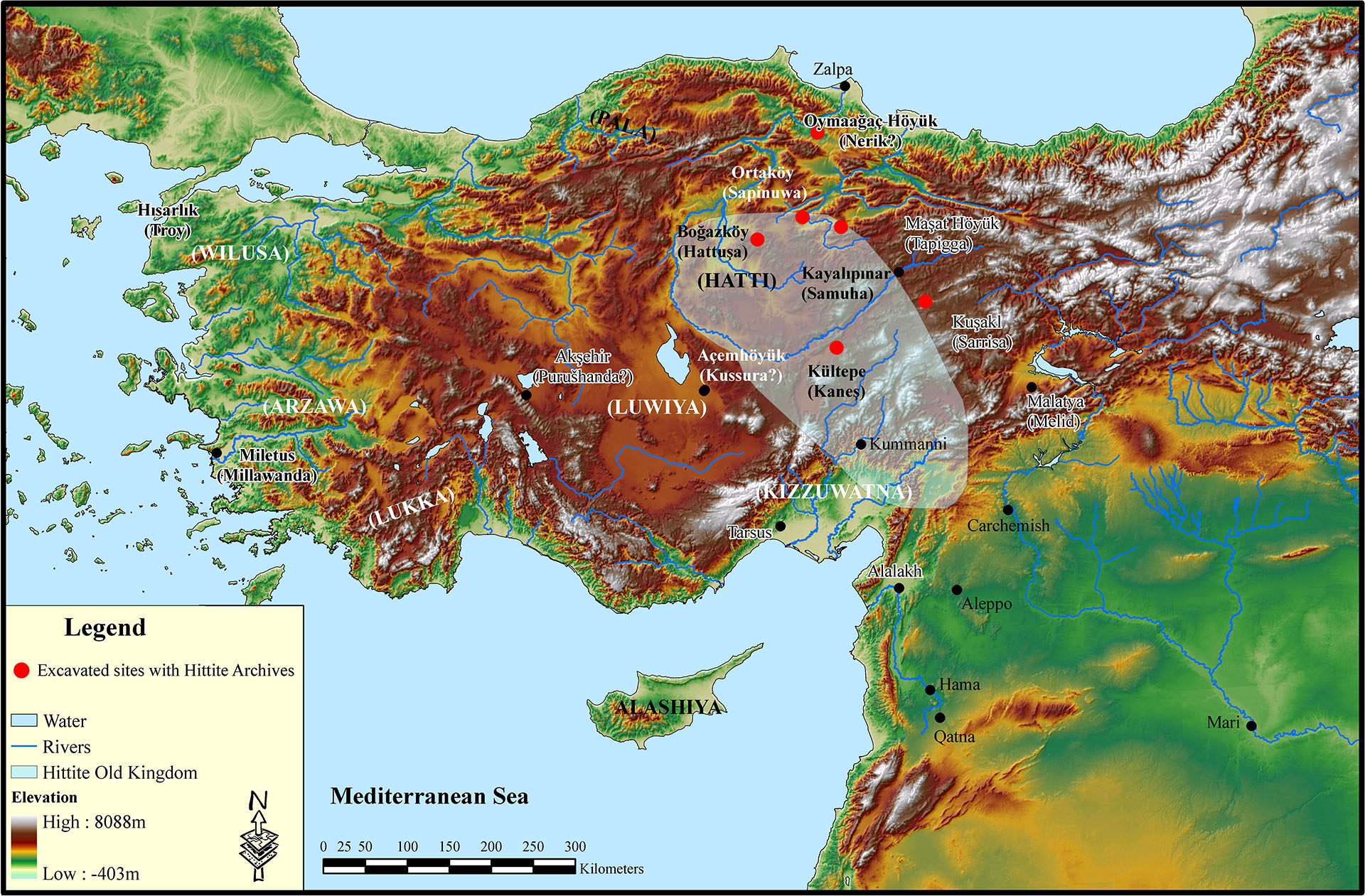
Land of Luwiya

Dura was an ancient region of Anatolia located west of the Kızılırmak River and one of the lands of the Assuwa coalition that opposed the Hittites. It is mentioned only in the Annals of Tudḫaliya, a text that chronicled the acts of Hittite monarch Tudḫaliya I.

== Etymology ==
The etymology of Dura is unknown. It was one of six lands identified by the Hittites with the dur root, possibly from the Akkadian language e.durû meaning "settlement" and/or "the area around a city or village. The root dur was commonly appended to the name of cities by the Kassites after the Hittite sack of Babylon in 1595 BC and had the meaning "fortification" or "city wall."

== History ==
Dura is named as one of the lands that comprised the Assuwa coalition, a military confederacy of twenty-two towns that opposed the Hittite army as it campaigned west of the Maraššantiya:

But when I turned back to Hattusa, then against me these lands declared war: [—]lugga, Kispuwa, Unaliya, [—], Dura, Halluwa, Huwallusiya, Karakisa, Dunda, Adadura, Parista, [—], [—]waa, Warsiya, Kuruppiya, [—]luissa, Alatra, Mount Pahurina, Pasuhalta, [—], Wilusiya, Taruisa. [These lands] with their warriors assembled themselves...and drew up their army opposite me...

The site has yet to be archaeologically located and It does not appear to be attested anywhere else. See generally the debate concerning the location of Assuwa.

== See also ==
- Ancient regions of Anatolia
- Assuwa
