= Pasuhalta (region) =

Pasuhalta was a region of Bronze Age Anatolia

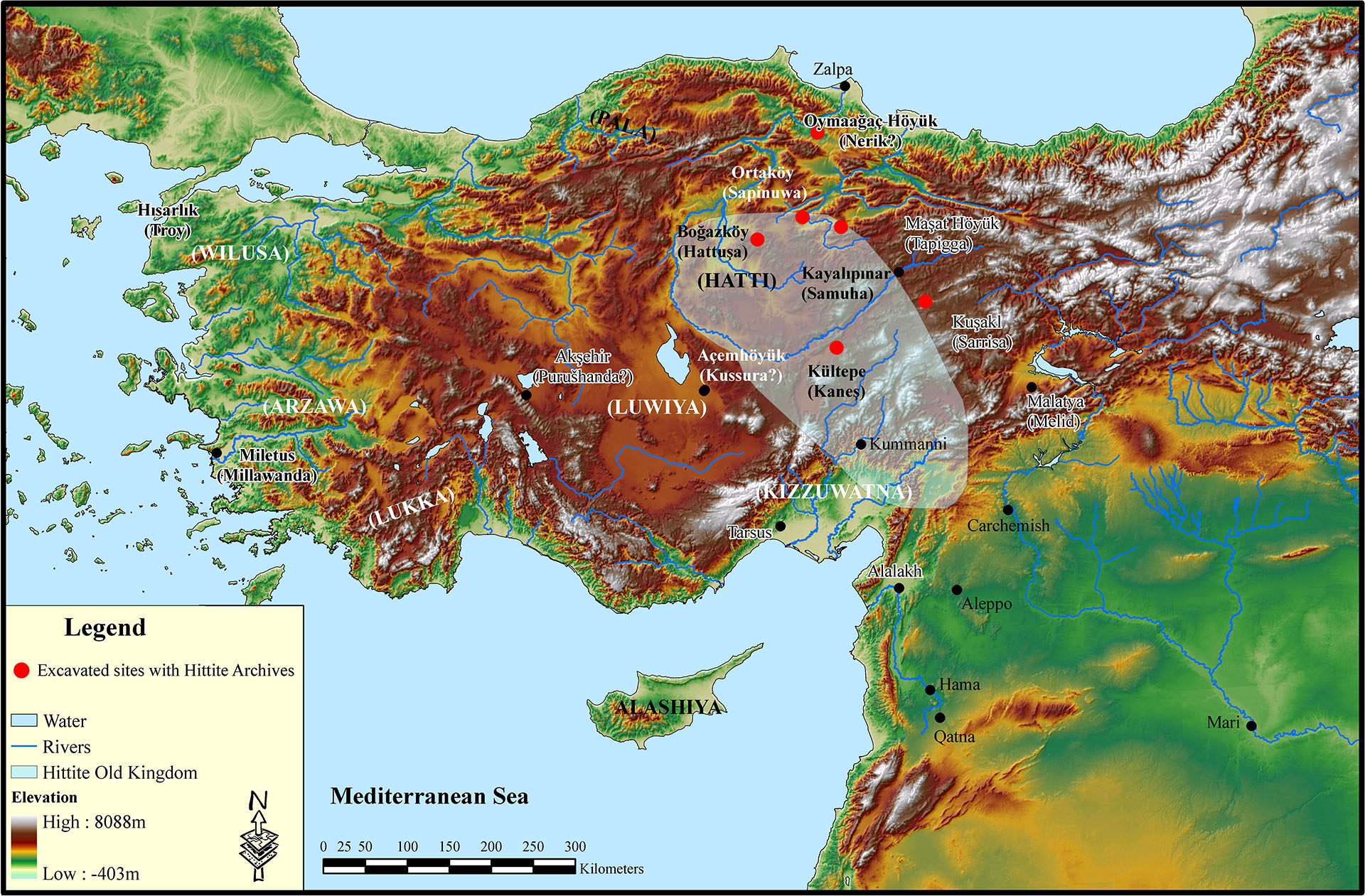
Land of Luwiya

Pasuhalta was an ancient region of Anatolia and one of the lands of the Assuwa coalition that opposed the Hittites toward the end of the fifteenth century BC. It is named only in the Annals of Tudḫaliya, a text that chronicled the acts of Hittite monarch Tudḫaliya I.

== Etymology ==
Pasuhalta has also been transliterated as pasu halta. The Indo-Iranian root pasu means "livestock" or "cattle." The Luwic stem -halta has been translated as "to appeal" or "to call." Its name suggests one of the cattle-cultures of ancient Anatolia as addressed in the Hittite Telipinu myth.

== Geography ==
Bryce describes a Hittite cattle raid toward "the south-west" in Arzawiya as early as circa 1650-1620 BC. The subsequent reference to Pasuhalta (or pasu halta) likewise gives no specific geographic indicators except the vague appellation of Arzawan lands. See generally the debate concerning the location of Assuwa. The Luwic cognate ("pasba") is found on the Xanthian Obelisk.

== History ==
Pasuhalta (or pasu halta) is named as one of the lands that comprised the Assuwa league, a military confederacy of twenty-two towns that opposed the Hittite army as it campaigned west of the Maraššantiya:

But when I turned back to Hattusa, then against me these lands declared war: [—]lugga, Kispuwa, Unaliya, [—], Dura, Halluwa, Huwallusiya, Karakisa, Dunda, Adadura, Parista, [—], [—]waa, Warsiya, Kuruppiya, [—]luissa, Alatra, Mount Pahurina, Pasuhalta, [—], Wilusiya, Taruisa. [These lands] with their warriors assembled themselves...and drew up their army opposite me...

As with most of the Assuwan states, it has yet to be located archaeologically. The coalition appears to have been destroyed sometime after 1430 BC.

== See also ==
- Ancient regions of Anatolia
- Assuwa
