= Timonium (disambiguation) =

Timonium may refer to:

== Places ==
- Timonium (Paphlagonia), an ancient fort
- Timonium, Maryland
  - Timonium Road, exit 16 off Interstate 83 in Maryland
  - Timonium station (formerly Timonium Business Park)
- Timonium Fairgrounds and Timonium Racetrack, location of the Maryland State Fair
  - Fairgrounds station (formerly Timonium Fairgrounds)

== Others ==
- A fictional ore (see List of fictional elements, materials, isotopes and atomic particles)
- The uncompleted palace of Mark Antony in Alexandria
