= Alatra (region) =

Bronze Age region of Anatolia

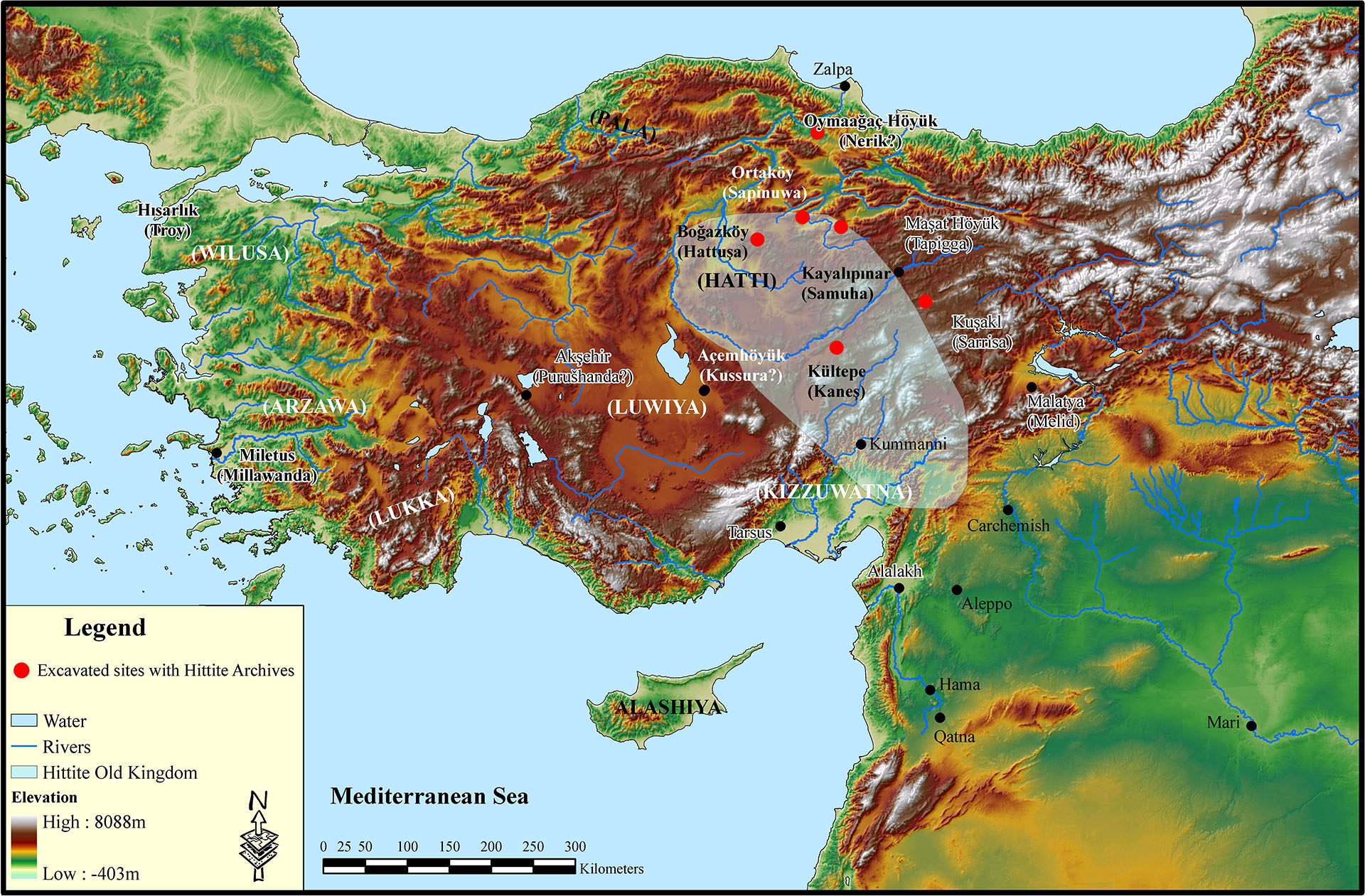
Land of Luwiya

Alatra was an ancient region of Anatolia and one of the lands of the Assuwa coalition that opposed the Hittites. It is mentioned in the Annals of Tudḫaliya and possibly in a later Iron Age stela.

== Geography ==
The site has yet to be archaeologically located. Woudhuizen noted the similarity to the Luwian word for "army camp" (kwalatarna) and suggested it was sited at Kaunos in ancient Caria. A funerary stelea at Carchemish dated to the 800s BC makes reference to "the people of Kwalatarna and Tlawa", a grouping that includes a site in classical Lycia. Thonemann locates it at classical Toriaeum.

== History ==
Alatra is named as one of the lands that comprised the Assuwa coalition, a military confederacy of twenty-two towns that opposed the Hittite army as it campaigned west of the Maraššantiya:

But when I turned back to Hattusa, then against me these lands declared war: [—]lugga, Kispuwa, Unaliya, [—], Dura, Halluwa, Huwallusiya, Karakisa, Dunda, Adadura, Parista, [—], [—]waa, Warsiya, Kuruppiya, [—]luissa, Alatra, Mount Pahurina, Pasuhalta, [—], Wilusiya, Taruisa. [These lands] with their warriors assembled themselves...and drew up their army opposite me...

The reference to Kwalatarna is nearly 600 years later and is in the context of a sacrifice to the Sun goddess of Arinna.

== See also ==
- Ancient regions of Anatolia
- Assuwa
