= Halluwa =

Region of Bronze Age Anatolia

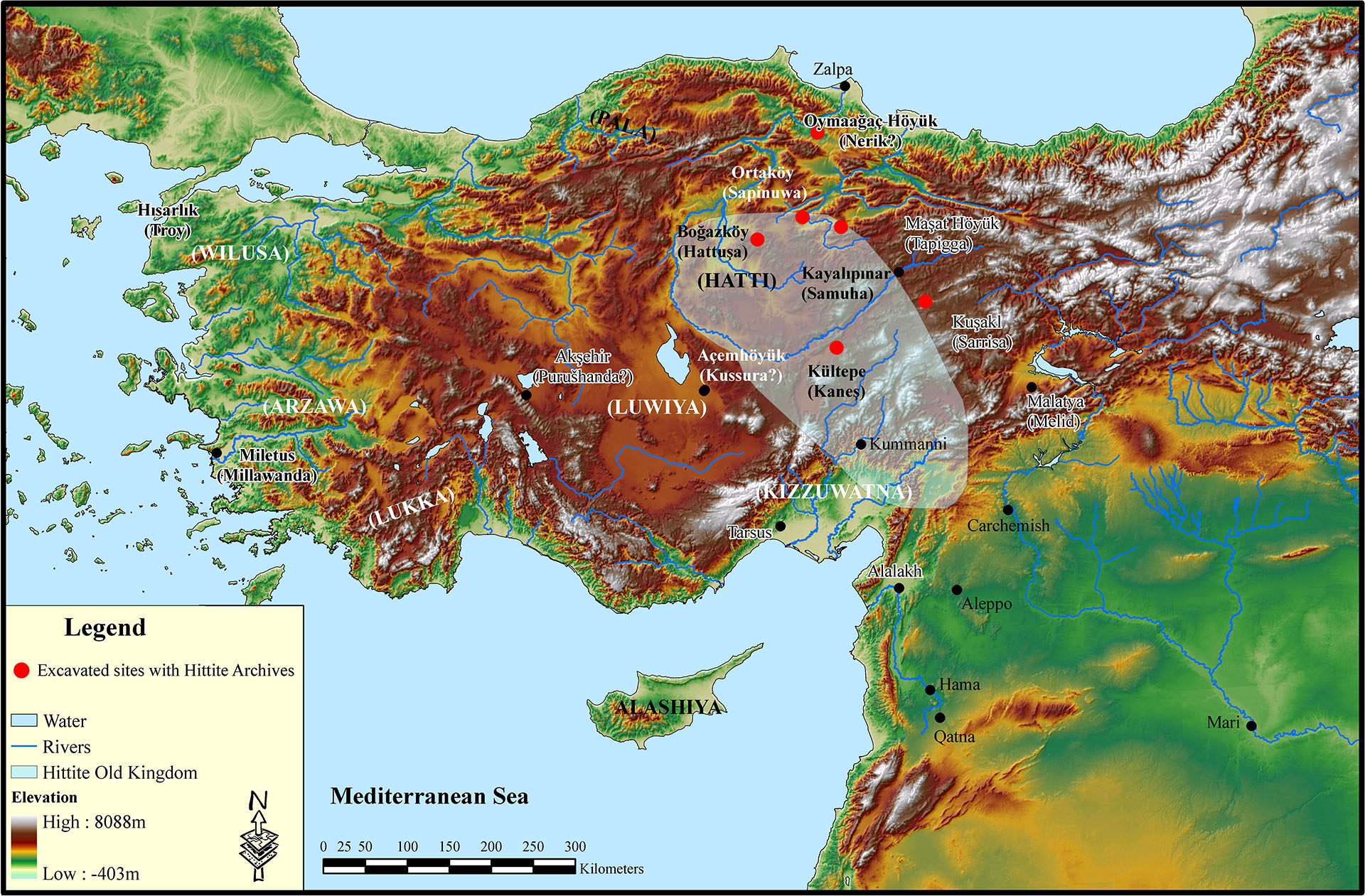
Land of Luwiya

Halluwa was an ancient region of Anatolia and one of the lands of the Assuwa coalition that opposed the Hittites toward the end of the fifteenth century BC. It is named only in the Annals of Tudḫaliya, a text that chronicled the acts of Hittite monarch Tudḫaliya I.

== Etymology ==
Halluwa is an atypical plural form of the transliteration ḫalluw-uš meaning "deep", probably used by the Hittites as a toponym for a gorge or valley.

== Geography ==
The site has yet to be archaeologically located. Woudhuizen believed it was somewhere to the northwest of Sardis in classical Lydia. It has been alternatively localized somewhere in the Ihlara valley in Cappadocia.

== History ==
Halluwa is named as one of the lands that comprised the Assuwa league, a military confederacy of twenty-two towns that opposed the Hittite army as it campaigned west of the Maraššantiya:

But when I turned back to Hattusa, then against me these lands declared war: [—]lugga, Kispuwa, Unaliya, [—], Dura, Halluwa, Huwallusiya, Karakisa, Dunda, Adadura, Parista, [—], [—]waa, Warsiya, Kuruppiya, [—]luissa, Alatra, Mount Pahurina, Pasuhalta, [—], Wilusiya, Taruisa. [These lands] with their warriors assembled themselves...and drew up their army opposite me...

As with most of the Assuwan states, it has yet to be located archaeologically. The coalition appears to have been destroyed sometime after 1430 BC.

== See also ==
- Ancient regions of Anatolia
- Assuwa
