= Pinara (disambiguation) =

Pinara is the name of:

- Pinara, a large city of Lycia
- Pinara (Pieria), a city of Pieria (Syria), between Cilicia and ancient Syria

Pinara may also refer to:

- Pinara (moth), genus of the family Lasiocampidae
