= Aḫḫulla =

Bronze Age region of Anatolia

Late Bronze Age regions of Anatolia/Asia Minor (circa 1200 BC) with main settlements.

Aḫḫulla was an ancient region of Anatolia located somewhere west of the upper Maraššantiya during the Middle Bronze Age. It is mentioned only in the Telepinu Proclamation.

== Etymology ==
The etymology of Aḫḫulla is unknown. It may have been a Hittite formulaic theophoric name for the mountain-god Hulla. The prefix aḫ is the construct state of the noun aḫum meaning "bank, shore, side or edge of a river."

== Geography ==
Ahhulla was located somewhere on the southern fringes of the land of Pala northeast of the Sakarya River. The etymology suggests a town along a river in the shadow of a mountain, perhaps somewhere at the foot of the Köroğlu range.

== History ==
A text known as the Telepinu Proclamation describes upheavals in Hittite-controlled Anatolia during the reign of Ammuna circa 1550-1530 BC. Ahhulla is named as one of the lands that "rebelled":

The land(s) became hostile towards him: the cities of [ ]-agga, [Ma'tila, Galmiya, (the land of) Adaniya, the land of Arzawiya, Salapa, Parduwata and Ahhulla. Wherever the troops went on campaign, however, they did not come back successfully.

However, as Bryce attributes "the first major [Hittite] venture to the west" to have been during the reign of Tudḫaliya I/II a hundred years later, the "hostility" of Ahhulla may have been nothing more than a cessation of tribute or trade and a corresponding cattle raid.

== See also ==
- Ancient regions of Anatolia
- Hittites
