= Camisa =

Ancient town in Armenia

Coordinates: 39°50′45″N 37°24′04″E

Camisa or Kamisa (Ancient Greek: τὰ Κάμισα), also known as Comassa and possibly as Eumeis, was a town of Lesser Armenia on the upper Halys River, east of modern Sivas, where the toponym survived into modern times as Kemiş. It was inhabited during Hellenistic, Roman, and Byzantine times. It loaned its name to the surrounding district of Camisene or Comisene; the fortress predated the building campaigns of Mithridates VI Eupator. Camisa was destroyed in Strabo's time, likely by Pompey in 66 BC. Following the Roman reorganization of the region, Mark Antony granted Kamisa and its surrounding district to Ateporix, a Galatian nobleman, who ruled until around 3 BC, after which the city was refounded as Sebastopolis. Salt was mined here in antiquity.
