= Abbawiya =

Bronze Age region of Anatolia

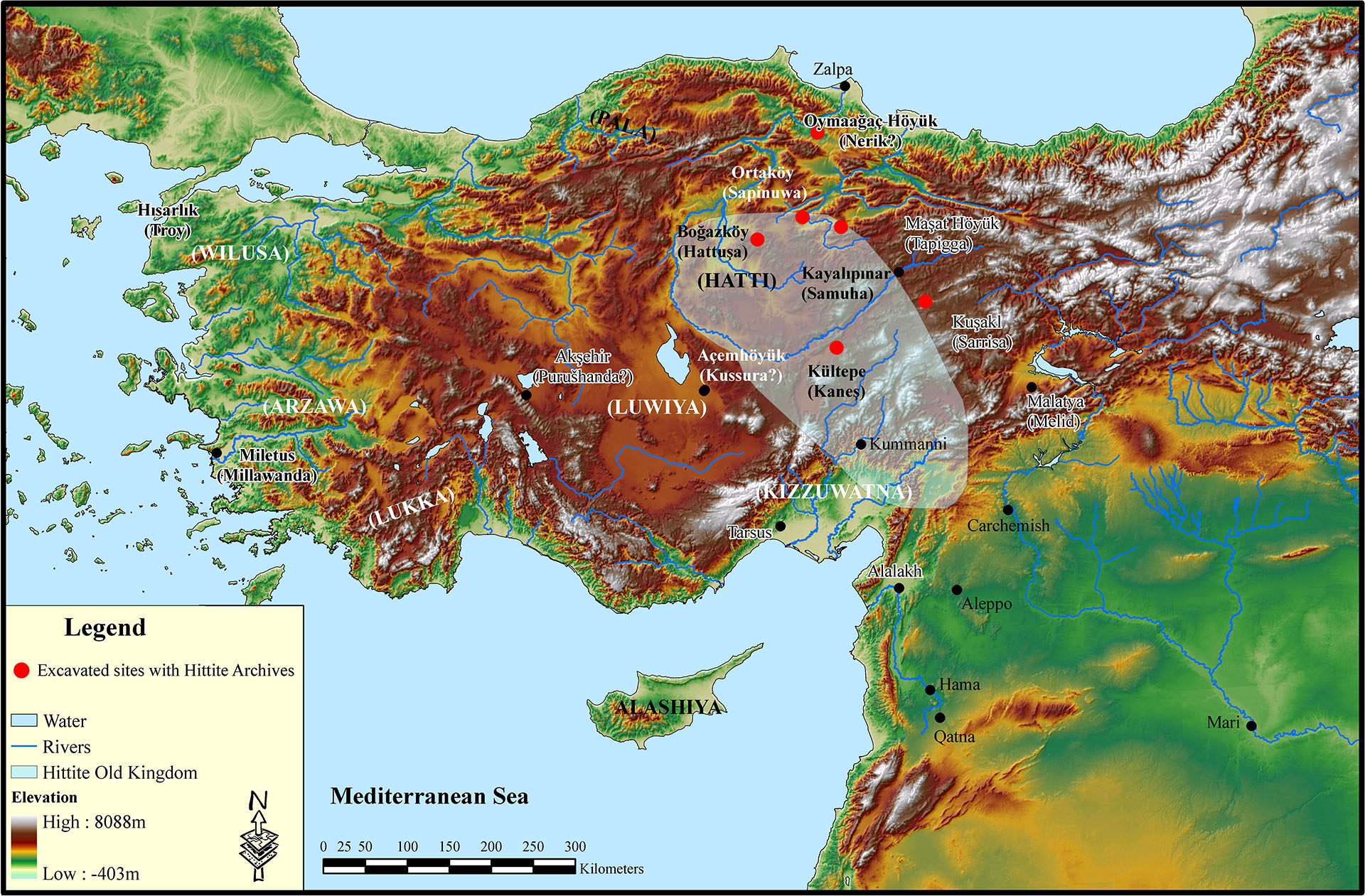
Land of Luwiya

Abbawiya was an ancient region of Anatolia located in classical Phrygia during the Middle Bronze Age.

== Etymology ==
The etymology of Abbawiya is unknown. It may have been an Arzawan formulaic theophoric name combining ^{d}lugal-a-ab-ba with the Luwic suffix wiya ("sent from").

== Geography ==
Abbawiya is equated with the Classical Abbaitis, a town in the modern Simav District of Kütahya Province. It "lay on a route between Ialanda and Milawatas" and "was approached by a hill climb."

== History ==
Abbawiya is mentioned in the final years of the 14th century BC in a treaty between the Hittite king Muršili II and king of the Seha River Land, Manapa-Tarhunta. It was located in the Seha River Land and considered part of the Arzawan lands prior to Mursili's "great western campaign." It was never conquered by the Hittites and simply remained part of Manapa-Tarhunta's kingdom after the breakup of the Arzawan lands into their constituent parts. Prior to that it appears to have been a border territory between the Seha River Land and Mira-Kawaliya.

== See also ==
- Ancient regions of Anatolia
- Arzawa
- Hittites
- Luwians
- Seha River Land
