= List of capes of Turkey =

List of capes in Turkey

A cape (headland) (Turkish: burun) is a point of land extending into the sea. Turkey, being a country of two big peninsulas (Anatolia and Thrace) is surrounded by four seas and has many capes. The surrounding seas (counter-clockwise from the north) are the Black Sea, the Sea of Marmara, the Aegean Sea, and the Mediterranean Sea.

== The list ==
The following list gives the names of capes of Turkey. The names are sometimes used with the suffix burun which means cape.

Cape	Main peninsula	Sea	Province
Fener	Anatolia	Black Sea	Trabzon
Kale	Anatolia	Black Sea	Giresun
Çam	Anatolia	Black Sea	Ordu
Yasun	Anatolia	Black Sea	Ordu
Civa	Anatolia	Black Sea	Samsun
Bafra	Anatolia	Black Sea	Samsun
Sinop	Anatolia	Black Sea	Sinop
İnce	Anatolia	Black Sea	Sinop
Usta	Anatolia	Black Sea	Sinop
Kerempe	Anatolia	Black Sea	Kastamonu
Köpekkayası	Anatolia	Black Sea	Kastamonu
Baba	Anatolia	Black Sea	Zonguldak
Pazarbaşı	Anatolia	Black Sea	Kocaeli
Servi	Thrace	Black Sea	Kırklareli
İğneada	Thrace	Black Sea	Kırklareli
Liman	Thrace	Marmara Sea	Tekirdağ
Boz	Anatolia	Marmara Sea	Yalova
Kabsul	Anatolia	Marmara Sea	Balıkesir
İnce	Anatolia	Marmara Sea	Çanakkale
Nara	Thrace	Marmara Sea	Çanakkale
Bakla	Thrace	Aegean Sea	Çanakkale
Büyükkemikli	Thrace	Aegean Sea	Çanakkale
İlyasbaba	Thrace	Aegean Sea	Çanakkale
Mehmetçik	Thrace	Aegean Sea	Çanakkale
Kum	Anatolia	Aegean Sea	Çanakkale
Baba	Anatolia	Aegean Sea	Çanakkale
Kum	Anatolia	Aegean Sea	Balıkesir
Aslan	Anatolia	Aegean Sea	İzmir
Kömür	Anatolia	Aegean Sea	İzmir
Top	Anatolia	Aegean Sea	İzmir
Teke	Anatolia	Aegean Sea	İzmir
Doğanbey	Anatolia	Aegean Sea	İzmir
Dil	Anatolia	Aegean Sea	Aydın
Tekağaç	Anatolia	Aegean Sea	Aydın
Fener	Anatolia	Aegean Sea	Muğla
İnce	Anatolia	Aegean Sea	Muğla
İskandil	Anatolia	Aegean Sea	Muğla
Deveboynu	Anatolia	Aegean Sea	Muğla
Kara	Anatolia	Mediterranean Sea	Muğla
Kadırga	Anatolia	Mediterranean Sea	Muğla
Kurtoğlu	Anatolia	Mediterranean Sea	Muğla
İlbiz	Anatolia	Mediterranean Sea	Muğla
Yedi	Anatolia	Mediterranean Sea	Muğla
Yalı	Anatolia	Mediterranean Sea	Antalya
Ulu	Anatolia	Mediterranean Sea	Antalya
Kırlangıç	Anatolia	Mediterranean Sea	Antalya
Çavuş	Anatolia	Mediterranean Sea	Antalya
Dildarde	Anatolia	Mediterranean Sea	Antalya
Anamur	Anatolia	Mediterranean Sea	Mersin
Sulusalma	Anatolia	Mediterranean Sea	Mersin
Tisan	Anatolia	Mediterranean Sea	Mersin
İncekum	Anatolia	Mediterranean Sea	Mersin
Deli	Anatolia	Mediterranean Sea	Mersin
Karataş	Anatolia	Mediterranean Sea	Adana
Portakal	Anatolia	Mediterranean Sea	Adana
Akıncı	Anatolia	Mediterranean Sea	Hatay

== See also ==
- Bays of Turkey
- Peninsulas of Turkey
- Geography of Turkey
