= Camisene =

Historical region of Anatolia

Camisene or Kamisene (Ancient Greek: Καμισηνή), also called Comisene, was a historical region of Anatolia. Strabo mentions Culupene or Calupene and Camisene as bordering on the Lesser Armenia, and he includes them within his reckoning of Pontus. Rock-salt was dug in these districts, and there was a strong place Camisa, which was ruined in Strabo's time. In another place he says that the Halys River rises in Great Cappadocia, near Pontice, and in Camisene. Camisa was on the road from Sebastia to Nicopolis, and 24 Roman miles from Sebastia (modern Sivas). The Camisene, then, is in the upper basin of the Halys or Kizilirmak.
