= Phazemon =

Town in the west of ancient Pontus

Coordinates: 40°58′06″N 35°40′01″E

Phazemon (Ancient Greek: Φαζημών), also known as Thermai Phazemoniton, was a town in the west of ancient Pontus, south of the Gazelonitis, and north of Amasia; it contained hot mineral springs. Pompey, after his victory over Mithridates, planted a colony there, and changed its name into Neapolis (Νεάπολις), from which the whole district was called Neapolitis, having previously been called Phazemonitis.

Its site is located near Havza, Samsun Province, Turkey.
