= Diacopa =

Town in the west of ancient Pontus

Coordinates: 40°53′11″N 35°12′01″E

Diacopa or Diakopa was a town in the west of ancient Pontus, inhabited in Hellenistic and Roman times. The town gave its name to a region of Pontus called the Diacopene.

Its site is tentatively located near Gümüşhacıköy, Asiatic Turkey.
