= Küdür Peninsula =

Peninsula on the southwestern coast of Turkey

Native name: Küdür Yarımadası
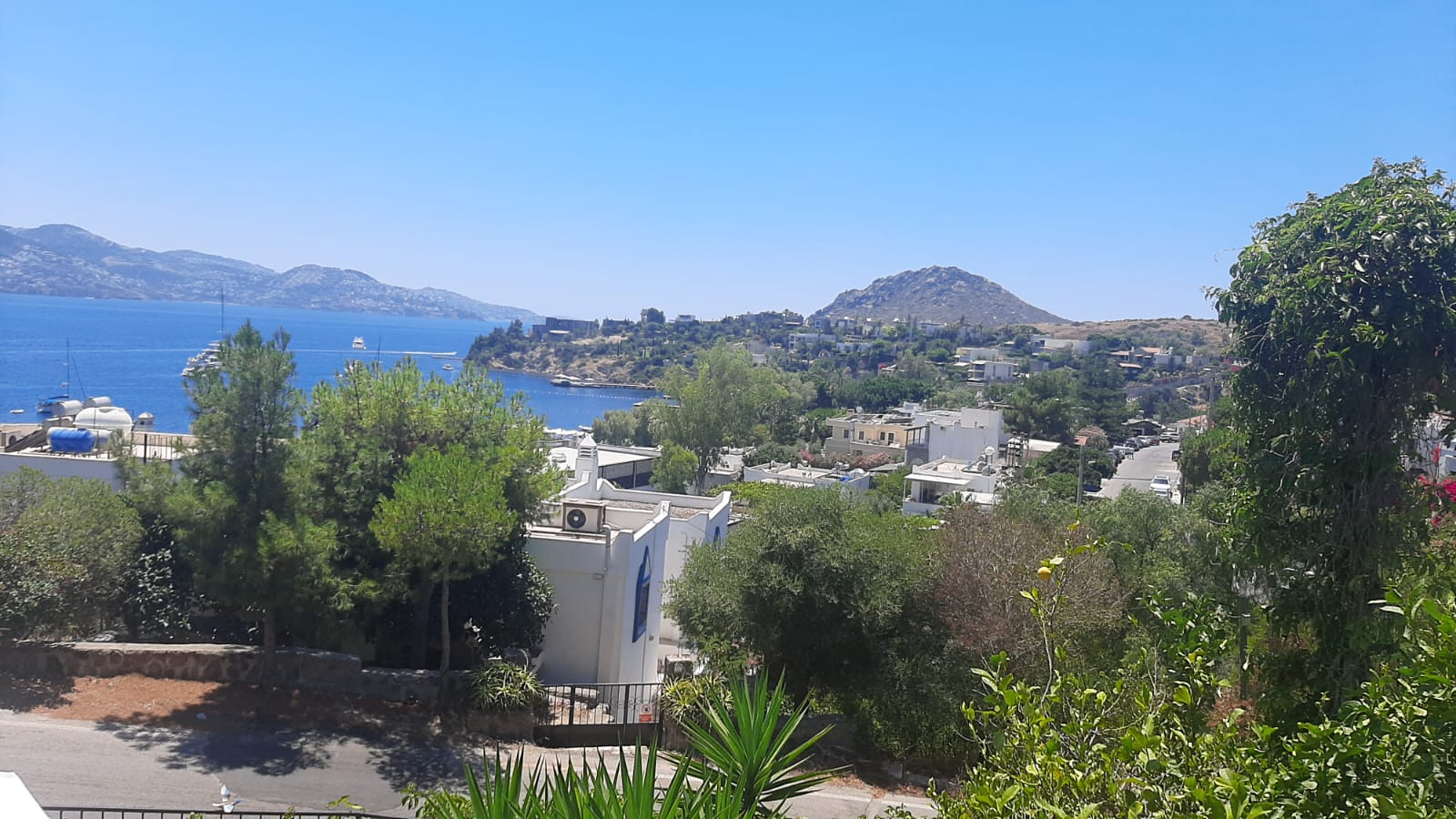
- A view of Küdür Penimsula and Küdür Bay (left).
- Interactive map of Küdür Peninsula

Geography
- Location: Aegean Sea
- Coordinates: 37.12471°N 27.27321°E -->

Administration
- Turkey
- Province: Muğla
- District: Bodrum

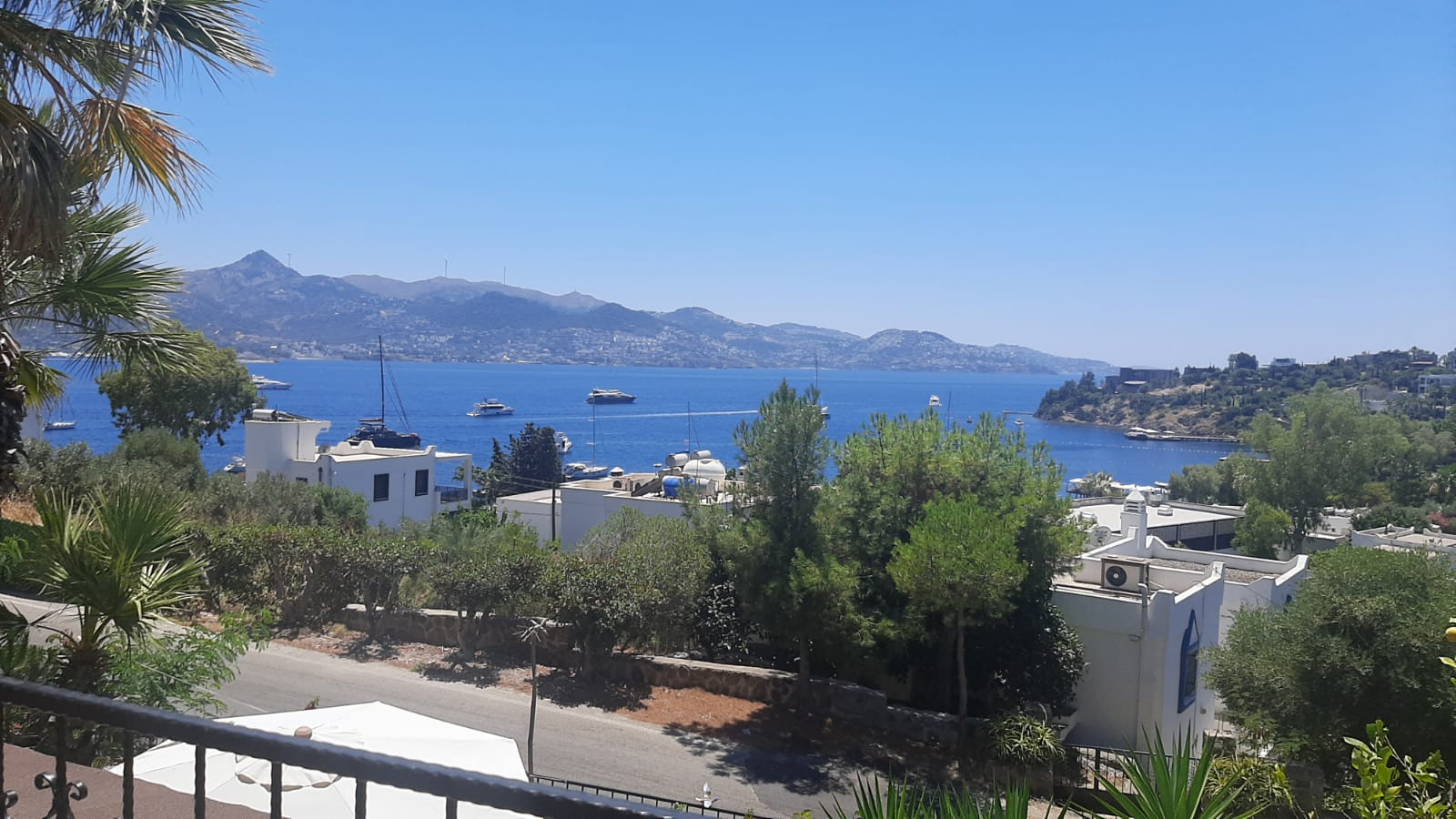
Küdür Bay and Yalıkavak seen from Küdür Peninsula

Küdür Peninsula (Turkish: Küdür Yarımadası) is a landform in the southeastern Aegean Sea connected to the mainland in Bodrum district of Muğla Province in southwestern Turkey. The peninsula is a protected archaeological area and a strict nature reserve.

== Location ==
The Küdür Peninsula, located in the southeastern Aegean Sea, is part of Yalıkavak neighborhood in Bodrum district of Muğla Province, southwestern Turkey. It faces Yalıkavak Marina (Palmarina) in the south over the Küdür Bay.

== Archaeological site ==
The Küdür Peninsula is a protected area declared as a first degree archaeological site. There are Panormus rock-cut tombs of the Lycians, Carians and ancient Greeks period (8th- to 7th-century BC) in the slopes of the peninsula hills above the Alacain Bay facing the island Kızılada (in ancient times: Greek: Λάγουσα). Rock-cut staircases allow access to the site.

== Nature reserve ==
The Küdür Peninsula was declared a nature reserve on 5 December 2019. The nature reserve is divided into a "Qualified Natural Protection Area" in the larger part of the peninsula and a "Sustainable Protection and Controlled Use Area" in the isthmus. After a re-evaluation, the peninsula was declared a Strict nature reserve by the Article 109 of the Presidential decree No. 1. From the end April 2020 on, the District municipality of Bodrum started evacuation, demolishing and removal of buildings and structures on the peninsula in line with the area's strict nature reserve status.

The Küdür Bay is a marine habitat for Mediterranean monk seal (Monachus monachus), which come here for breeding. The Mediterranean monk seal is a mammal creature that lives directly dependent on the shore. The species is protected as their number is very low. In 2010, it was reported that about 7-8 Mediterranean monk seals were living around the peninsula.

== Seaside resort ==
The Küdür Bay between the Küdür Peninsula and Yalıkavak neighborhood of Bodrum incorporates summer holiday resorts. A public beach flanked by private beach clubs offer free of charge swimming in the bay. The public beach feaures dressing cabins and WC, has also a car parking area free of charge, and a kiosk for food and drink.
