= Yalıkavak =

- Neighbourhood
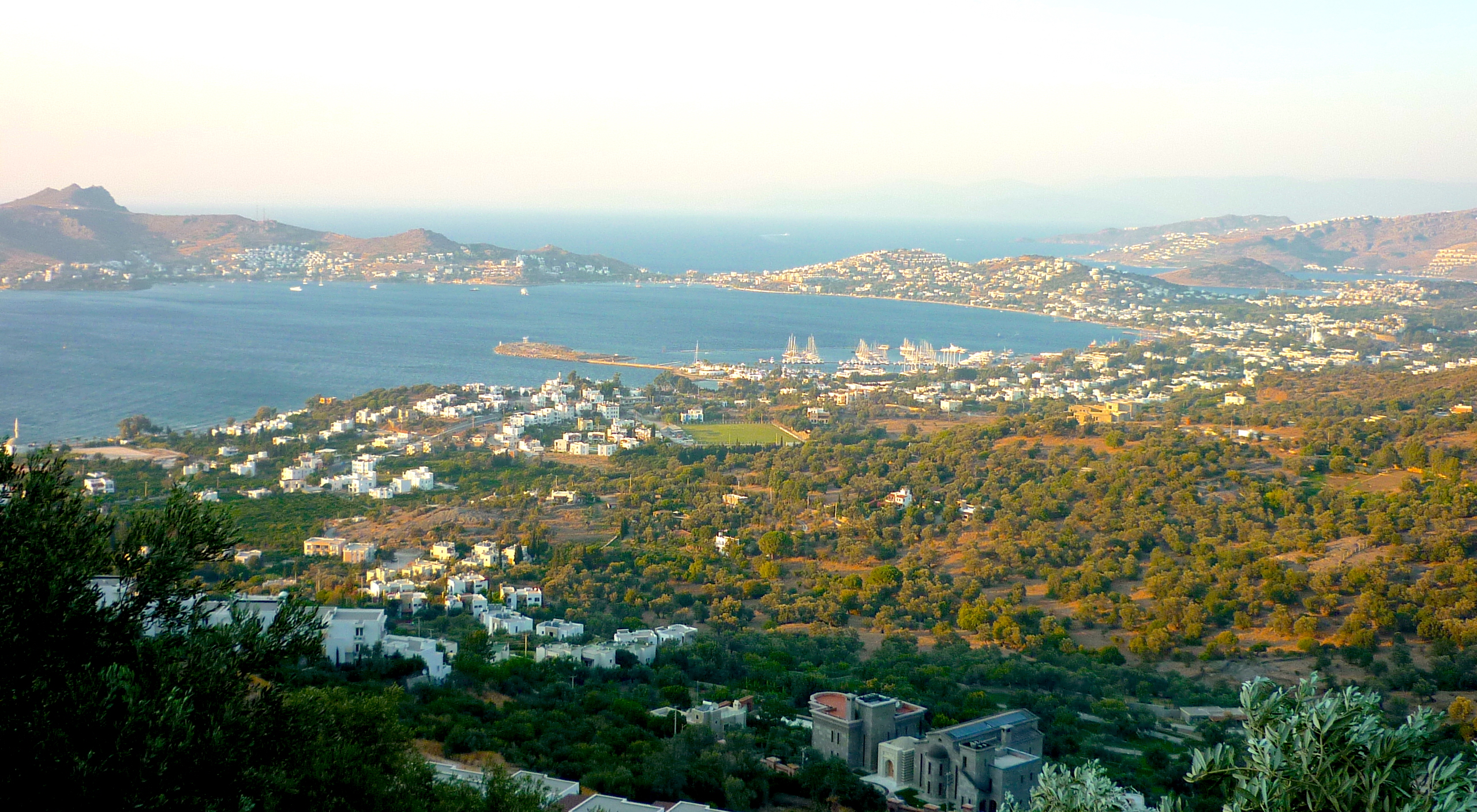

- Location within Turkey Location within Turkey Aegean
- Coordinates: 37.10352°N 27.29257°E
- Country: Turkey
- Province: Muğla
- District: Bodrum
- Population (2022): 6,532
- Time zone: UTC+3 (TRT)
- Postal code: 48400

Yalıkavak is a neighbourhood of the municipality and district of Bodrum, Muğla Province, Turkey. Its population is 6,532 (2022). Before the 2013 reorganisation, it had the status of a town (belde).

== Overview ==
Yalıkavak is on the Aegean coast. It is 18 km (11 mi) far from Bodrum, on the northern side of the Bodrum peninsula. Yalıkavak is surrounded by hills providing views of the town and surrounding Aegean Sea coastline, and there are several beaches and bays in the vicinity.

The Yalıkavak area has been inhabited since around the second millennium BCE.

Formerly the Bodrum area's main sponge diving port, Yalikavak is now a tourism hub and location for many holiday residences. The town has a bustling center with weekly markets (Tuesdays produce, Thursdays textiles and household items) and numerous shops and restaurants.

The Yalıkavak Marina, a major commercial development within the town, provides 620 berths for yachts up to 135m in length, as well as housing a range of shopping, dining and leisure facilities.

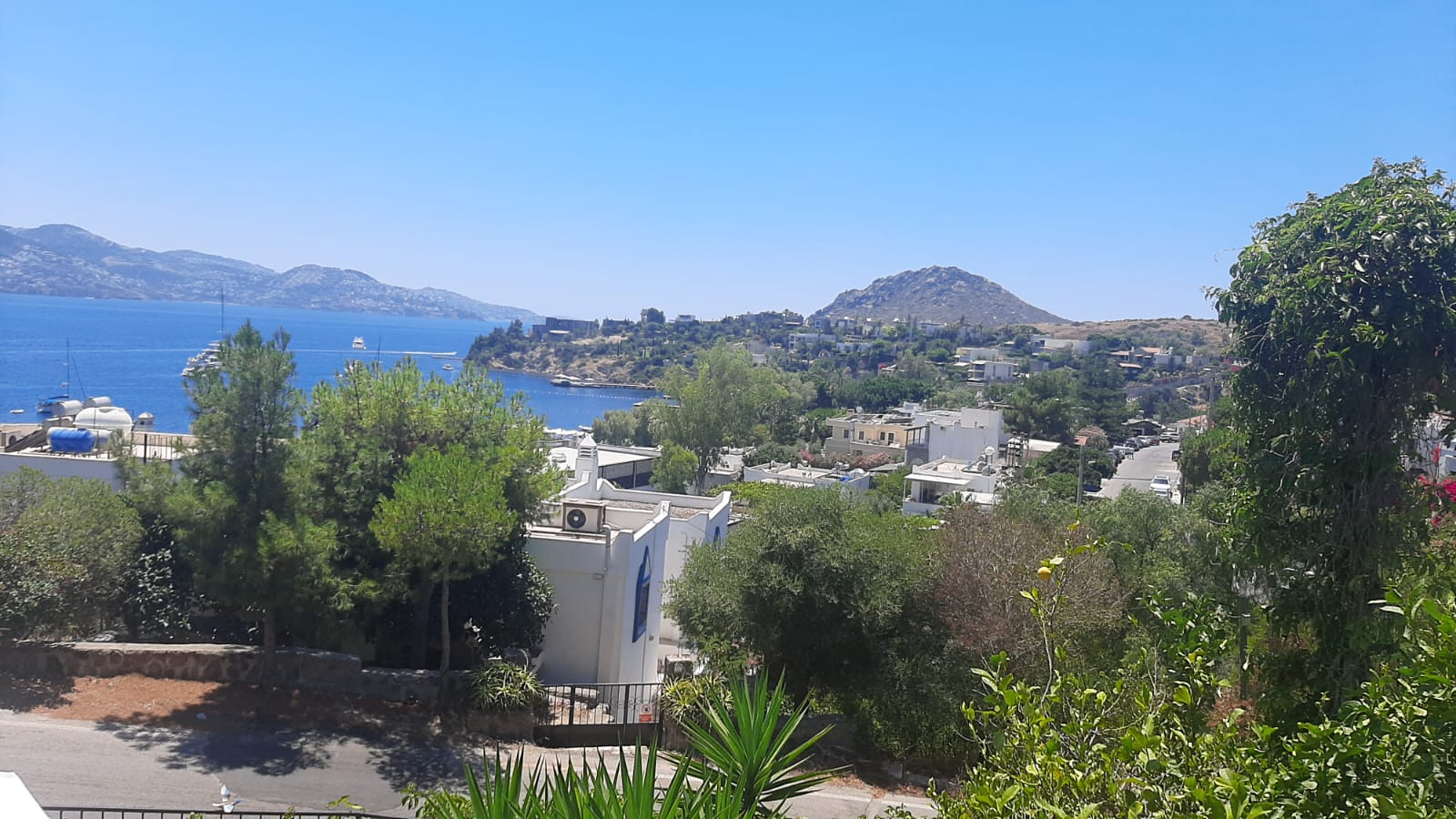
A view from the Küdür Peninsula and the Küdür Bay (left).

The Küdür Peninsula, part of Yalıkavak neighborhood, is located in the north. It is a first degree archaeological site featuring rock-cut tombs, a strict nature reserve and seaside resort.

== Sport ==
In 2009, Yalıkavak hosted the RS:X Youth World Championships in windsurfing, with 109 competitors taking part.

The women's handball team Yalıkavak SK, based in the neighboring Geriş, play in the Turkish Women's Handball Super League. They were runners-up of the 2021–22 season, and became champion in the 2023–24 and 2024–25 seasons, as well as won the Turkish Women's Handball Super Cup in 2023 and 2024.

== Gallery ==
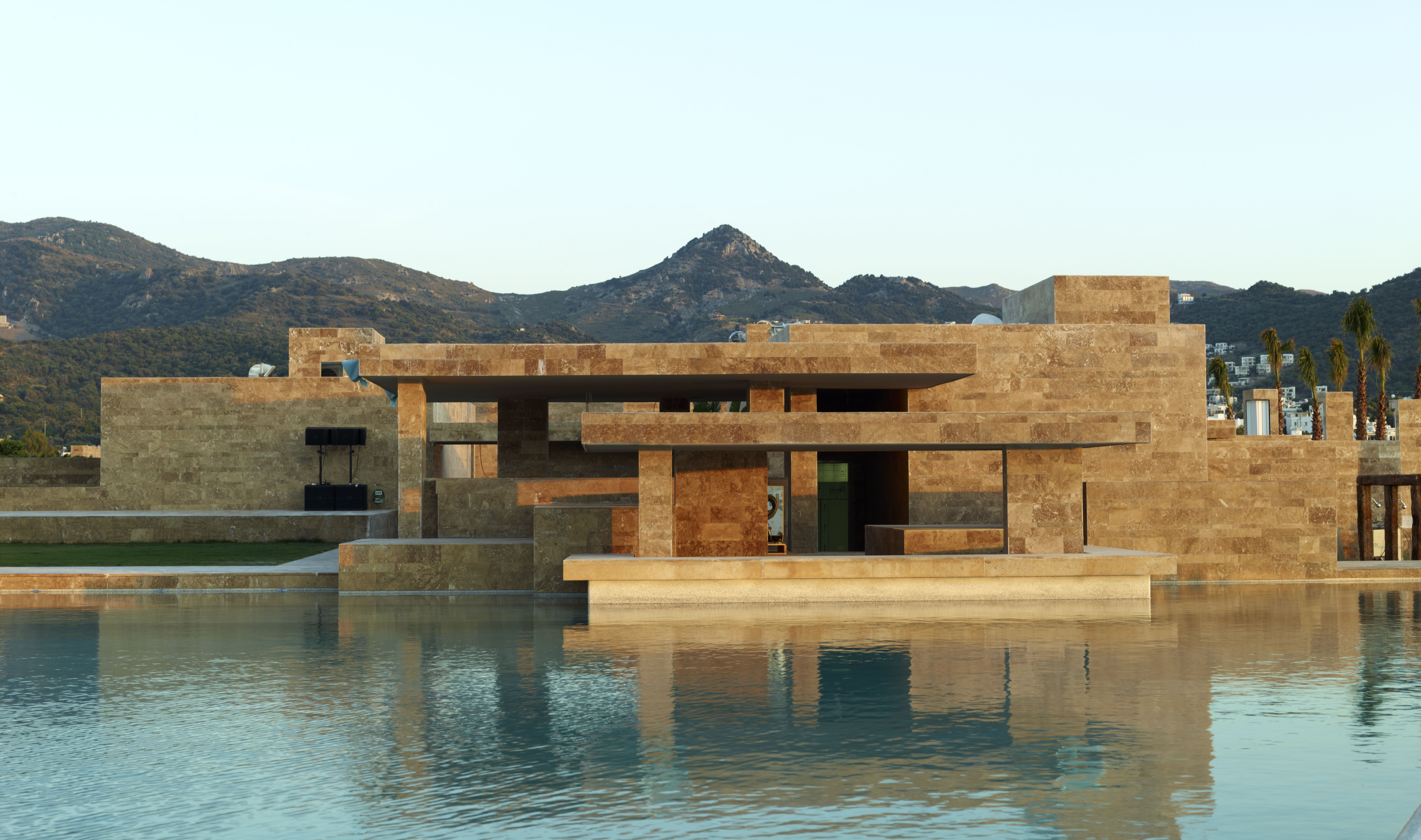
Palmarina designed by Emre Arolat

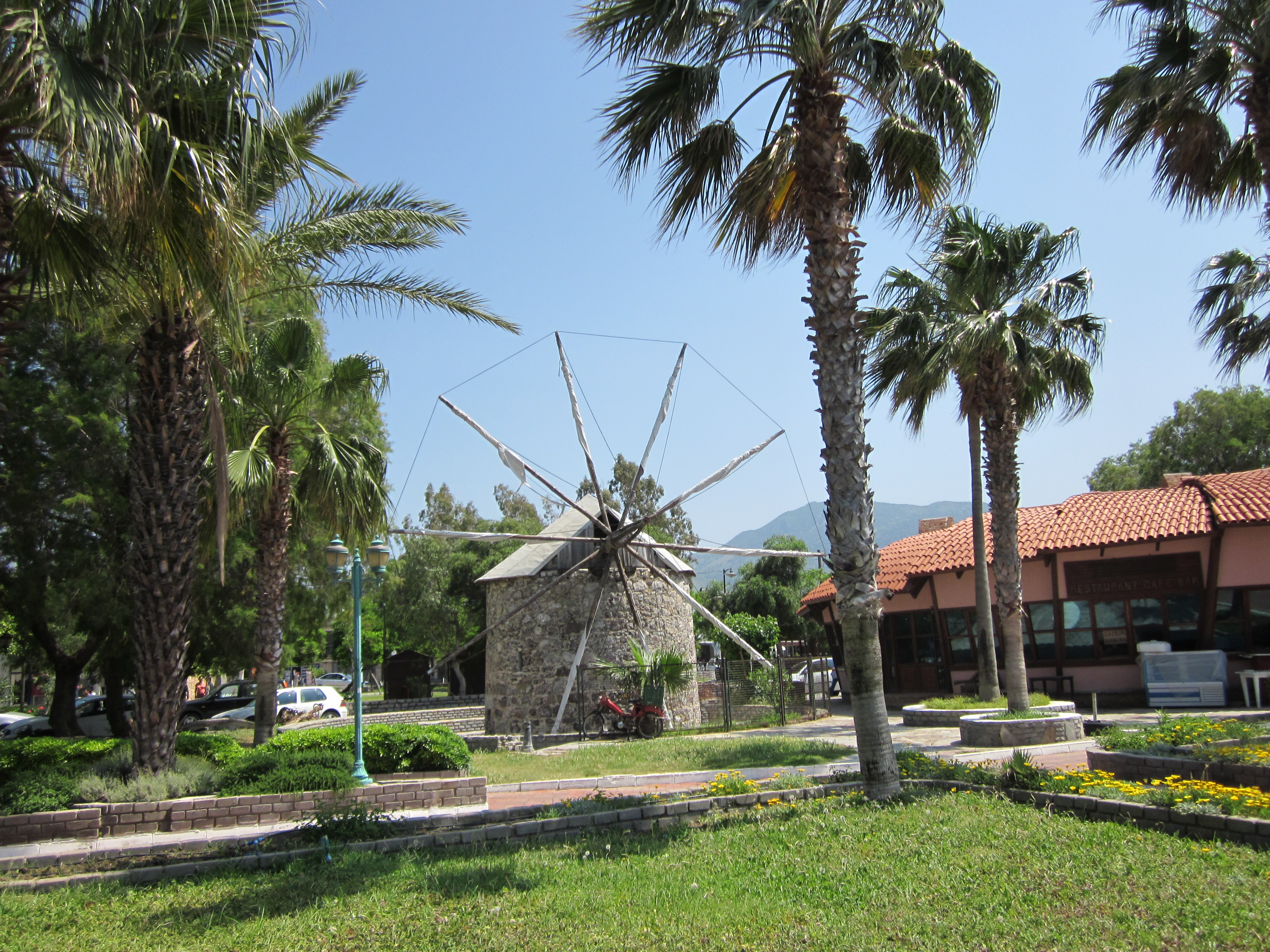
Windmills in Yalıkavak

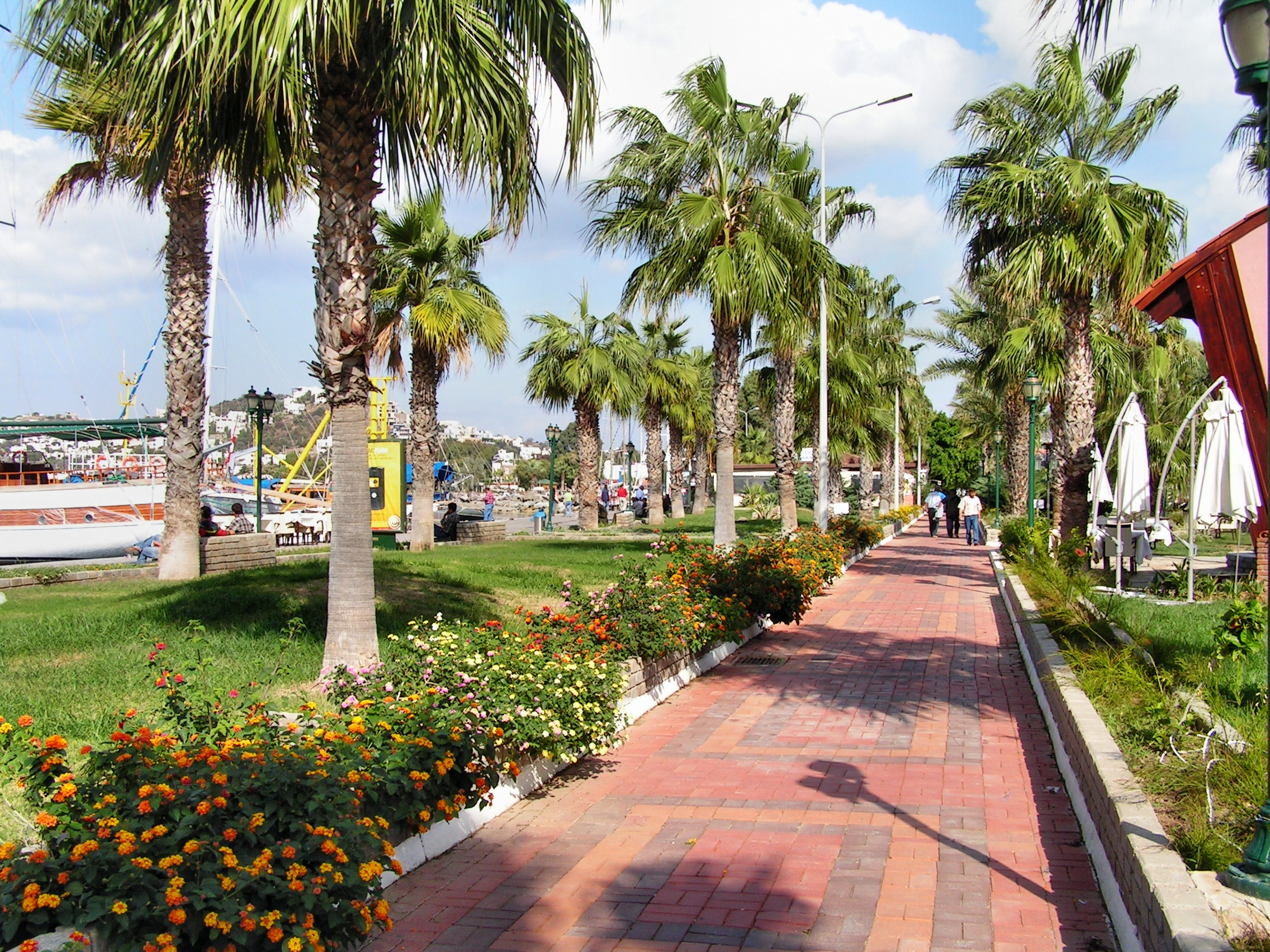
Coastline of Yalıkavak

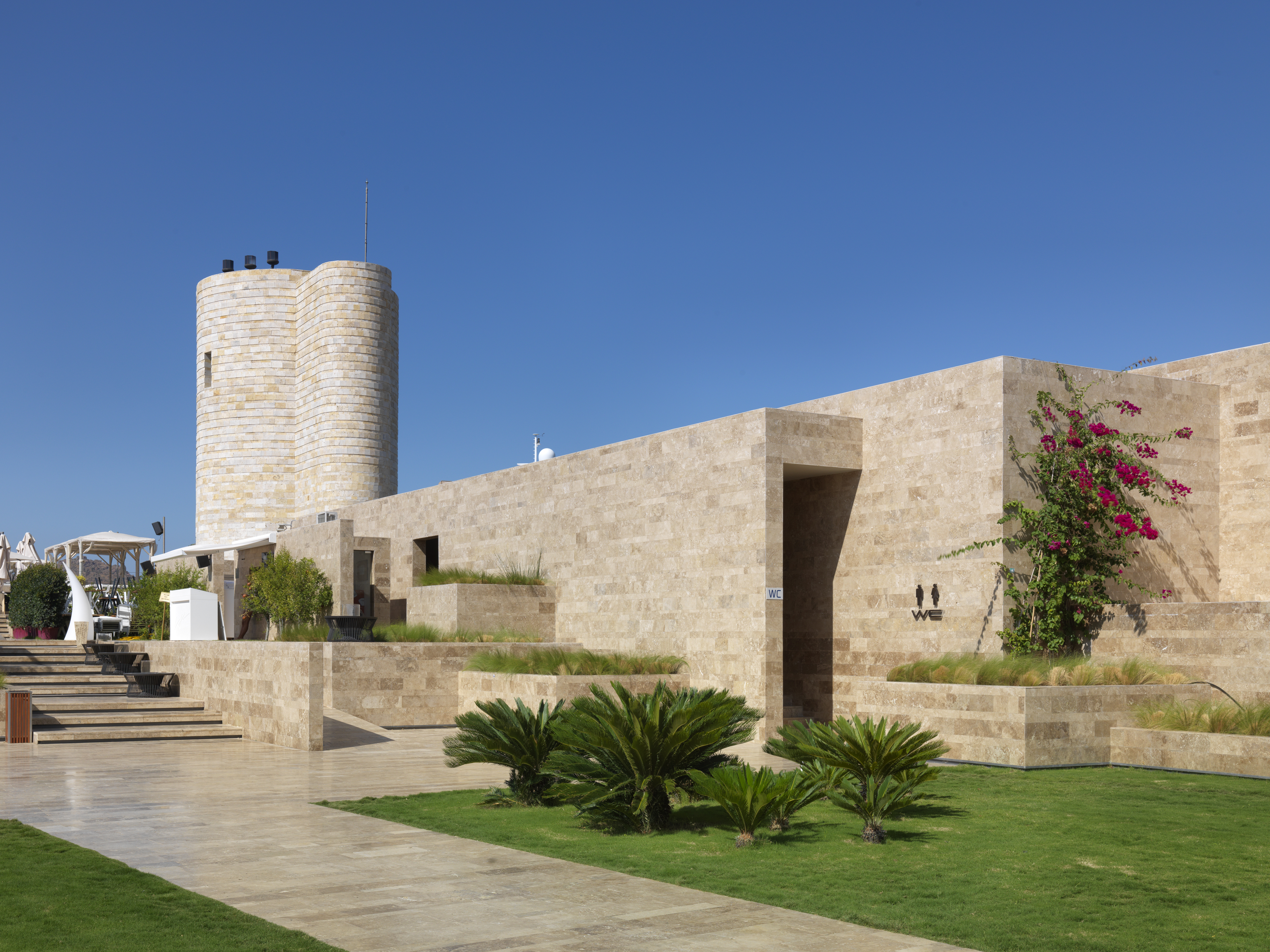
Yalıkavak Harbour

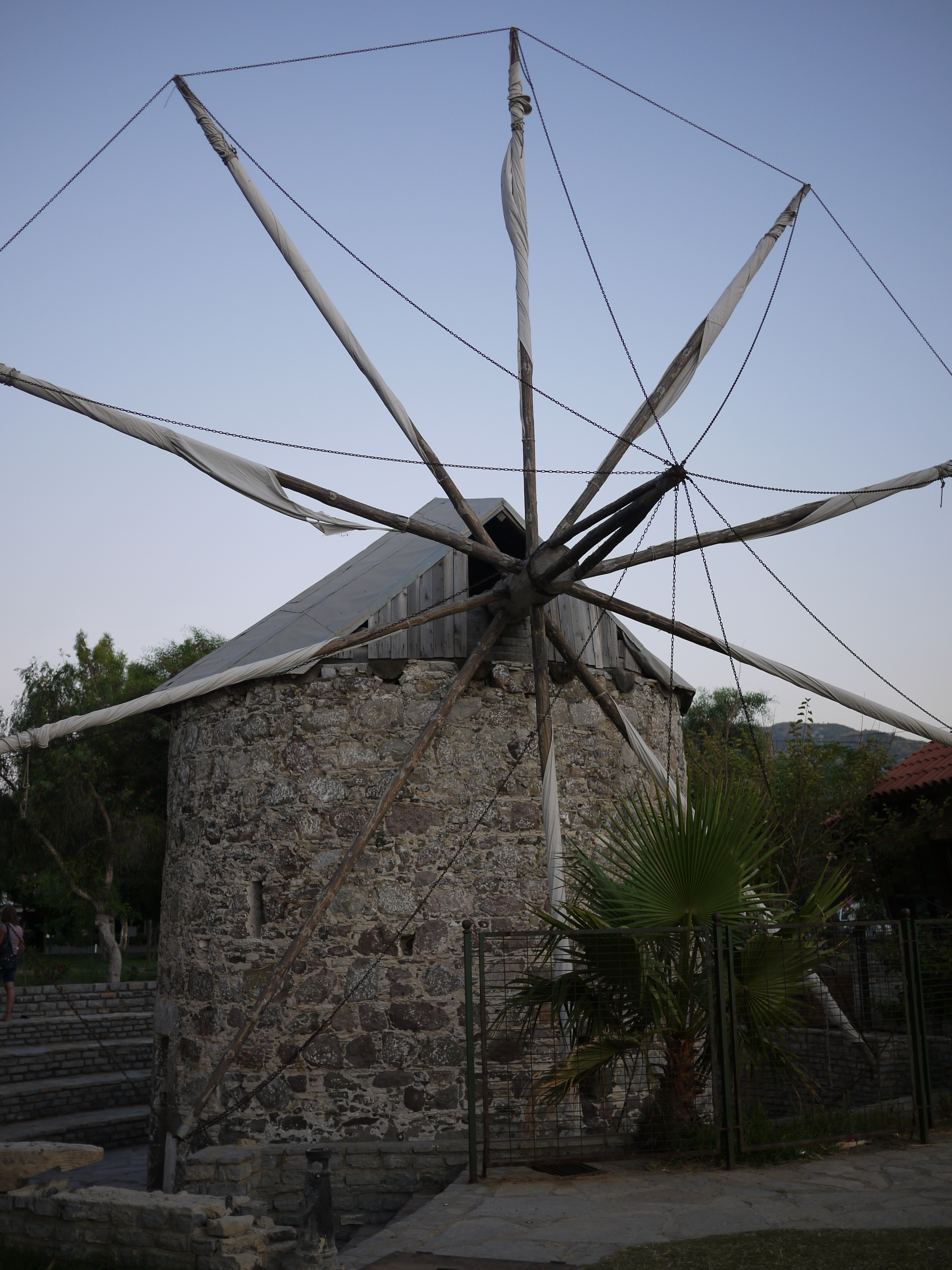
Yalikavak windmill built in 1859 and restored in 2005

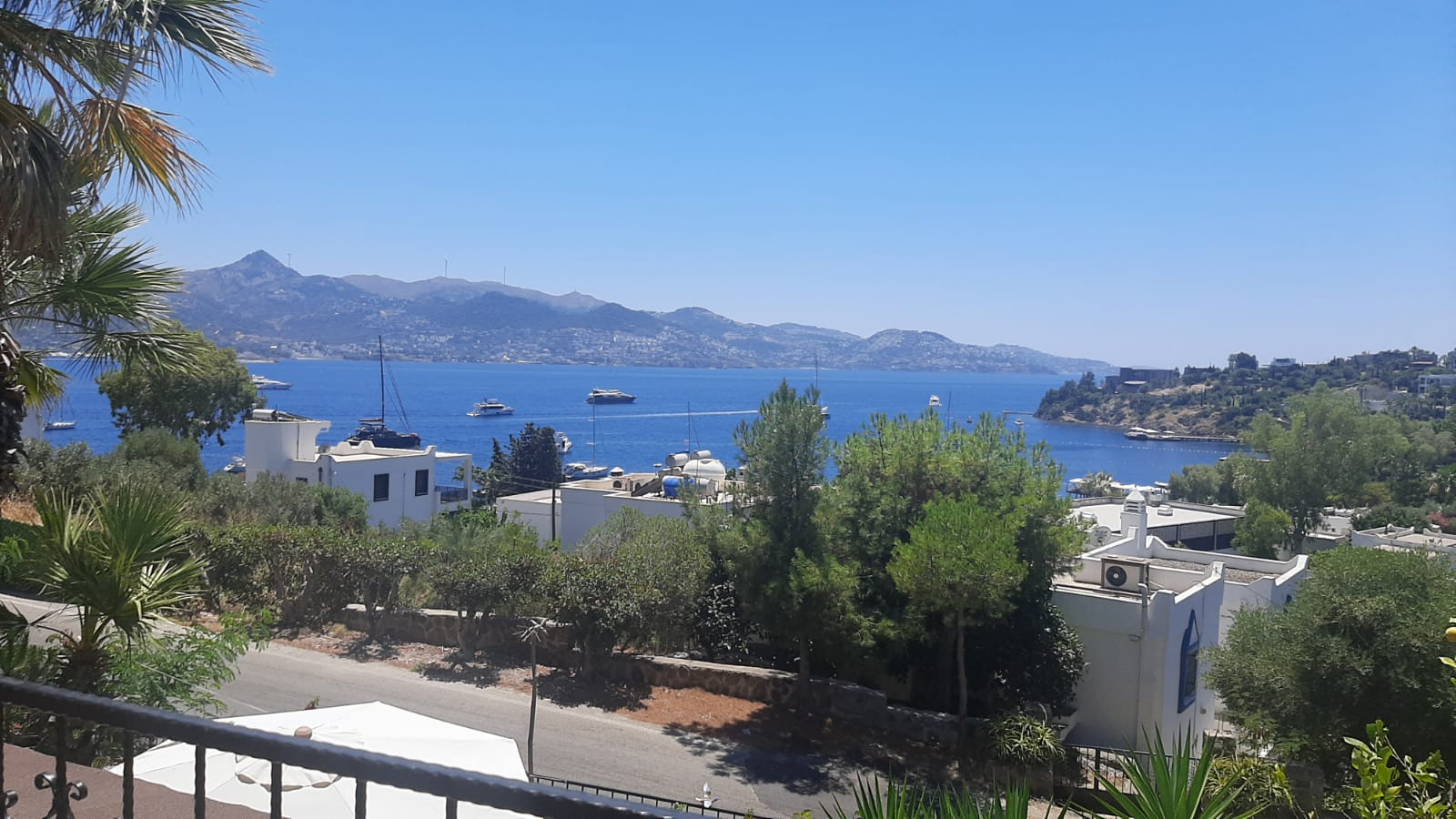
Yalıkavak and Küdür Bay seen from the Küdür Peninsula
