= Çukurbağ Peninsula =

Peninsula in Kaş, Antalya Province, Turkey

Çukurbağ Peninsula is a small Mediterranean peninsula in Turkey.

It is located to the west of Kaş ilçe (district) of Antalya Province and to the north of the Greek island Kastellorizo (Turkish: Meis). Kaş Marina is to the north of the peninsula. The tip of the peninsula is at 36°11′11″N 29°35′10″E. Its longer dimension (east to west) is about 5 kilometres (3.1 mi) .

The peninsula is known for touristic hotels and beaches.
