= Kocaeli Peninsula =

Northwestern Turkey peninsula

Coordinates: 41°00′N 29°36′E

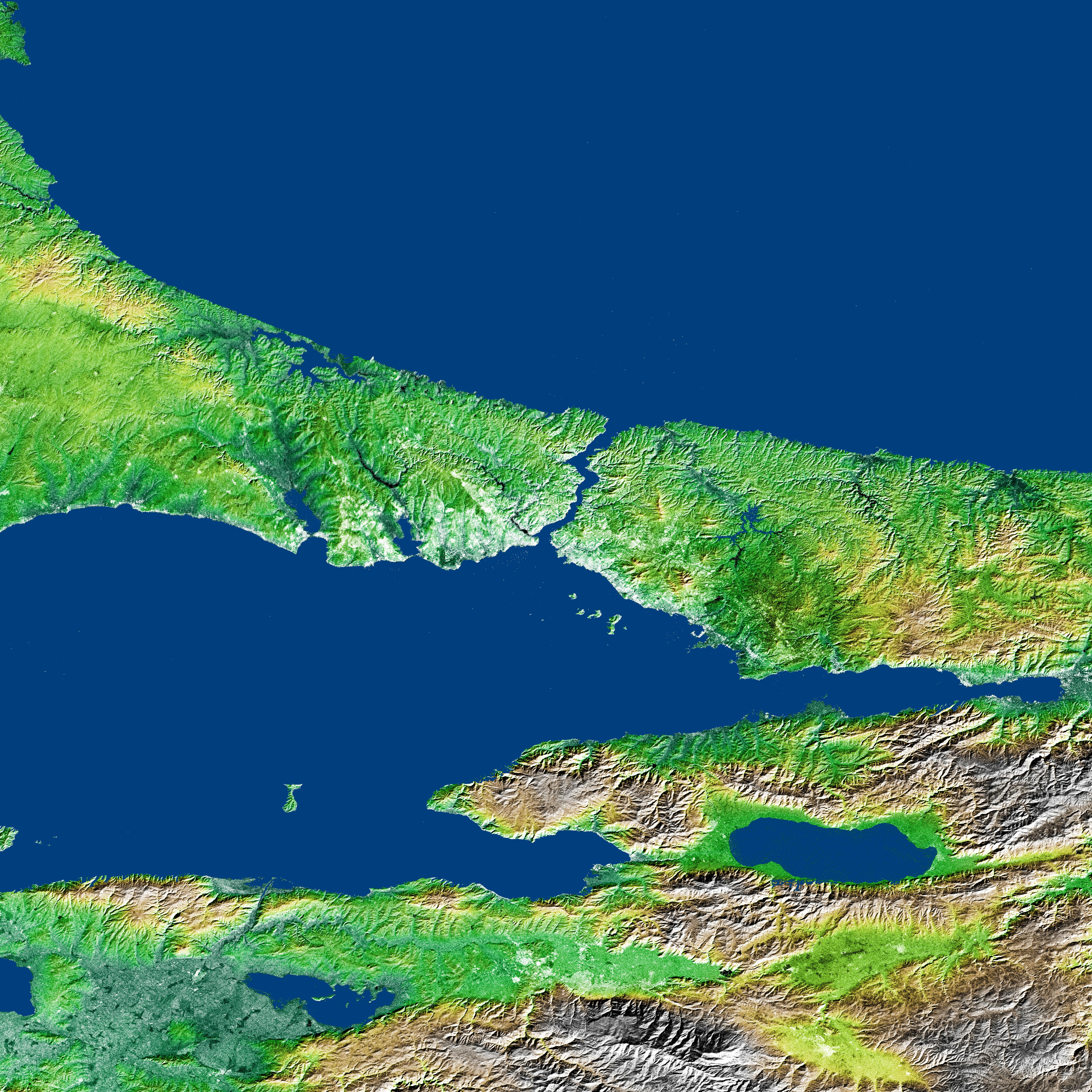
Kocaeli (east) and Çatalca peninsulas (west), separated by the Bosphorus

The Kocaeli Peninsula (Turkish: Kocaeli Yarımadası) lies in the northwest corner of Anatolia, Turkey, separating the Black Sea and the Sea of Marmara on the Asian side of the strait of Bosphorus. Approximately one-third of Istanbul, one of the most populous cities of the world, occupies its western part, and İzmit, another big city, is at the easternmost point of the peninsula.

== Geography ==
The peninsula is at the north west corner of Anatolia. The length toward west is 90 kilometres (56 mi) and the average width is about 40 kilometres (25 mi). It is bordered by the Black Sea to the north, Sea of Marmara to the south and the strait of Bosphorus (Turkish: Boğaziçi) to the west. The geographers consider it to be a part of Kocaeli Çatalca subregion, where Çatalca is a peninsula on the other side of Bosphorous.

== History ==
Together with the strait of Dardanelles, the passage through Bosphorus and the Kocaeli peninsula is the main passage of people from Europe to Asia. During ancient times, Phrygians, Bithynians and Galatians were some of them. But while Phrygians and Galatians moved to Central Anatolia, it was the Bithynians who controlled the region for a considerable time. Hannibal, the Carthaginian commander who took refuge in Bithynia, died in Kocaeli Peninsula at around 182 BC. His grave may be around Dilovası or at Gebze both at about the middle of Kocaeli Peninsula. Later the peninsula was a part of the Roman Empire, the Byzantine Empire, and the Ottoman Empire. In Byzantine times and among the local Greek population until the early 20th century, the peninsula was known as Mesothynia (Μεσοθυνία, "Middle Thynia").

== Population and economy ==
Kocaeli Peninsula is one of the most industrialised regions of Turkey. Approximately one-third of Istanbul, one of the most populous cities of the world, lies on the westernmost point of the Kocaeli peninsula, and İzmit, another big city, is at the easternmost point of the peninsula. The southern coastline (Marmara) between the two is dotted with settlements, factories and the shipyards. Population density along this coastline is very high, as opposed to the northern (Black Sea) coastline.
