= Kazıklı Bay =

Abay in Turkey

Kazıklı Bay (Turkish: Kazıklı Limanı) is an Aegean bay of Turkey. Although typically a bay, its name in Turkish is internationally registered as Kazıklı Limanı ("Kazıklı Harbor").

It is a part of Milas ilçe (district) of Muğla Province. The mid point of the entrance (south west) is at 37°17′52″N 27°27′49″E. Its length is over 5 kilometres (3.1 mi) and the width is about 2 kilometres (1.2 mi). On the northeast end of the bay there are two lesser bays called bays of Karasu. There are also two lesser bays on the northwest coast of the bay called Ardışlıağıl Bay and Yarım Bay.
