= Panormus (Caria) =

Ancient harbor town of Caria

Coordinates: 37°23′59″N 27°13′37″E

Panormus or Panormos (Ancient Greek: Πάνορμος) was a small port town of ancient Caria, on the coast south of Miletus.

Its site is located near the modern Kovela Limanı.
