= Diacopene =

Diacopene or Diakopene (Ancient Greek: Διακοπηνή) was a district situated in the western part of ancient Pontus, as described by Strabo, after the plain Chiliocomon near Amasia. It was given its name by the town Diacopa located within the district.
