= Thynia =

In the ancient world, Thynia (/ˈθɪniə/, Greek: Θυνία) was a region of Europe along the northern coast of the Propontis, opposite Bithynia on the Asian side. It was originally occupied by the Thyni, a Thracian people who came from Thrace. Note that in the Middle Ages, Mesothynia ("middle Thynia") was the peninsula of modern Kocaeli.

According to Greek mythology, its name came from Thyneas (Θυνέας) son of Phineas (Φινέας).

In the Argonautica (Book 2), Jason and the Argonauts are turned aside from the Clashing Rocks at Bithynia, and go to the opposite coast to consult King Phineus.
