= Proseilemmene =

Proseilemmene was a Roman town in ancient Anatolia; possibly of ancient Phrygia or of Galatia. Its site is not located specifically but is west of Lake Tuz in Asiatic Turkey.
