= Çatalca Peninsula =

Peninsula of Turkey

Coordinates: 41.3°N 28.3°E

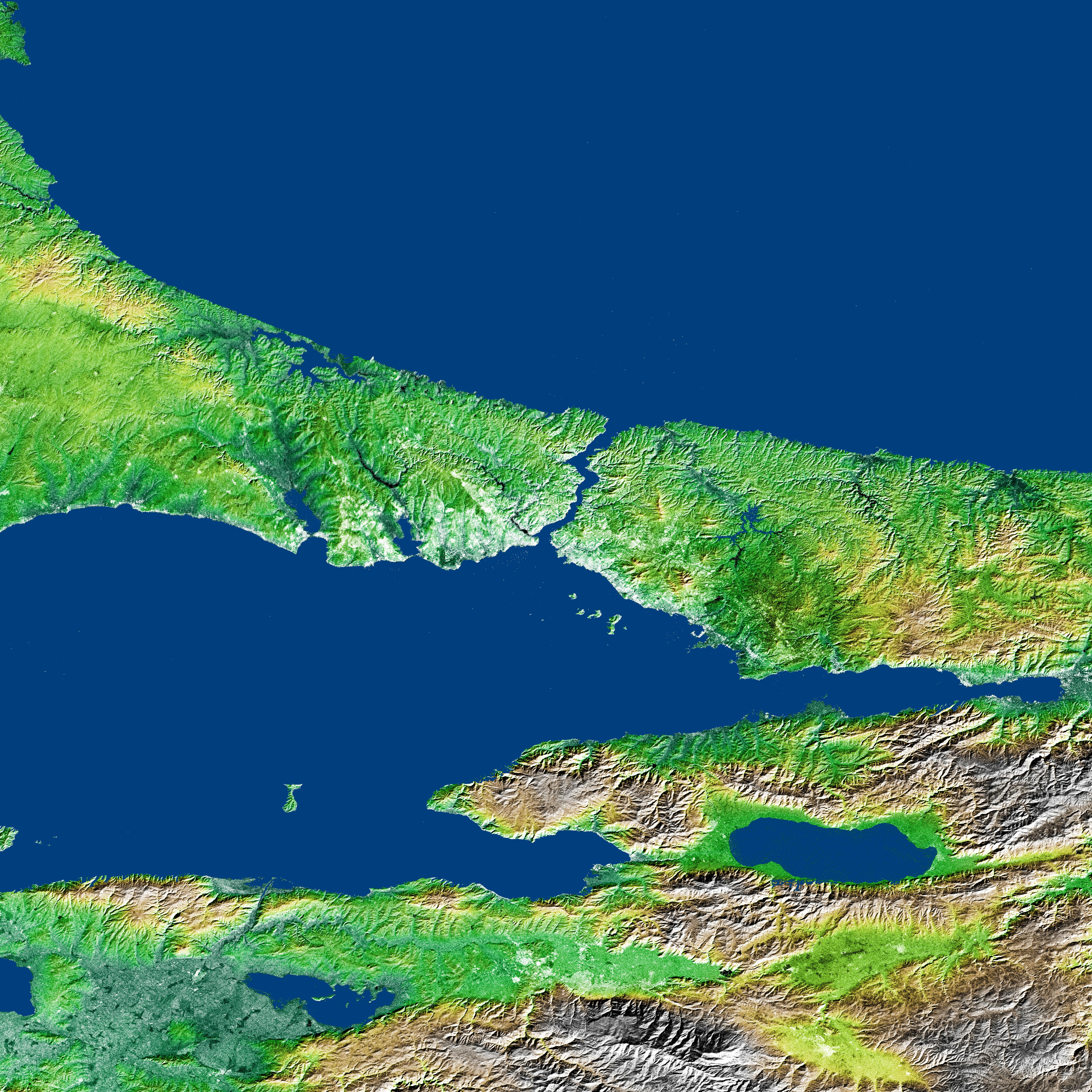
Çatalca (west) and Kocaeli peninsulas (east) separated by the Bosphorus

The Çatalca Peninsula lies in the European section of Turkey (Thrace), extending from the southeast Balkans and separating the Black Sea from the Sea of Marmara on the western side of the strait of Bosphorus. Approximately two thirds of Istanbul, one of the most populous cities of the world, occupy its eastern part.

== Geography ==
The peninsula is roughly rectangular. It is bordered by the Black Sea to the north, Sea of Marmara to the south and Bosphorus to the east. The west border is more or less arbitrary, but usually taken to correspond with the western border of Istanbul Province. Thus defined, its north to south width is about 40 kilometres (25 mi) and the west to east length is about 90 kilometres (56 mi). Çatalca Peninsula is almost a mirror image of the Kocaeli Peninsula on the other side of the Bosphorus. In fact, the geographers consider it to be a part of the Kocaeli–Çatalca subregion. There are several natural and artificial lakes in the Çatalca peninsula including Lake Durusu, Lake Büyükçekmece and Lake Küçükçekmece.

== History ==
During the reign of Byzantine Emperor Anastasius I (491–518) a defense wall had been constructed between Evcik beach at the north and Silivri at the south to defend Constantinople from Huns and other attackers. The 40 kilometres (25 mi) wall was one of the longest ramparts of Europe. But even then such attackers as Avars (616), Bulgarians (813) and Pechenegs (1090) were able to lay siege to Constantinople. After 1371, most of Çatalca Peninsula fell to Ottoman Turks. The whole peninsula became a part of Ottoman Empire by the conquest of Constantinople in 1453. Since then Çatalca Peninsula is a Turkish land except for Bulgarian attack during the First Balkan War and temporary occupation by Greece at the end of World War I.

== Population and economy ==
Çatalca Peninsula (together with Kocaeli Peninsula at the other side of Bosphorus) is the most industrialised region of Turkey. The 25 European districts of Istanbul have a total population of more than 10 million (2022). The population density of the peninsula exceeds 2000/km^{2} (5180/ mi^{2}).
