= Pieria (Syria) =

Coordinates: 36.1°N 35.9°E

In Classical times Pieria was the southern area of the Amanus Mountains, a part of the province of Roman Syria. Cities included Seleucia Pieria and Pinara. Today it is part of Turkey.

Strabo XVI 2,4 and Nonnus (Dionysiaca 2:94-112) include descriptions of the Pieria and the Pierides. In Nonnos the Pierides from the grove at Daphne are threatened by the lumberjack of Kalypso. Nonnius gave a very different story about them as compared to Homer, Odyssey 5, 50.

The Pieria at the mouth of the river Orontes are the homelands of the daughters of Antioche, also called Antiope, as the Scholion on Euripides Phoinissai 5 and the Scholion on Sophokles Trachiniae 266 shows. In the same way are the arguments of Tzetzes, Chiliades 7, 19.
