= Astarpa River =

River in Turkey

The Astarpa River (possibly the modern Meander River, Turkey) was a river in western Anatolia mentioned in Hittites records of the 14th century BC.

== Sources ==
=== Annals ===
The annals of Mursili II record that in the 3rd year of his reign, which would be 7 years prior to Mursili's eclipse in 1312 BC, prince Piyama-Kurunta of Arzawa stood against his army at Walma by the river Astarpa. Mursili defeated him at the river. Mursili chased Piyama-Kurunta into Apasa. The following winter, Mursili withdrew to the Astarpa to prepare for the next season.

The annals of Mursili during the Astarpa campaign mention nearby regions of "Apasa", "Millawanda", and "Ahhiyawa". It is thought that these are the Bronze Age names of Ephesus, Miletus, and Mycenaean Greece. Astarpa is most likely the Meander River. This means that Mira is probably to the north of Astarpa, and that its neighbouring Seha River Land would be to the north of Mira.

In Year 3 of Mursili II, he states in his extended annals: "Since Uhhazitis was sick, he did not come against me in battle, he sent forth his son, Piyama-Kurundas, (logogram, mSUM-ma-dLAMMA-an, acc. case) together with troops and horse(-troop)s against me. He stood against me in battle at Walma, at the R. Astarpa, and I My Sun(god) fought him." Thus, the river would be at Walma, and the battle ground between Arzawa (west) and Hatti (east).

=== Treaty ===
The Treaty of Muršili II with Kupanta-Kurunta of Mira and Kuwaliya (CTH 68) lists the Astarpa as the border of client region of Kuwaliya assigned to Kupanta-Kurunta of Mira, presumably the border between Mira and the adjacent Kuwaliya.
