= Pinara (Pieria) =

Pinara (Greek: τὰ Πίναρα; Eth.: Πιναρεύς) was an ancient city in Pieria in ancient Syria, mentioned by Pliny the Elder (H.N., v. 19 and v. 22) and Ptolemy (Geography, v. 15. § 12). Its present location has not been precisely determined, but it is known to be north-east of İskenderun in the southern Nur Mountains (then known as the Amanus mountains) in the modern-day Hatay Province of Turkey. The Nur / Amanus mountains separated ancient Cilicia from Coele-Syria. It may have been near Belen, Hatay, near the Belen Pass.
