= Timonitis =

Timonitis (Ancient Greek: Τιμωνῖτις) was a district in the interior of ancient Paphlagonia, near the borders of Bithynia. Pliny the Elder mentions its inhabitants under the name of Timoniacenses. Stephanus of Byzantium reports a fort of Paphlagonia named Timonium or Timonion (Τιμώνιον), from which the district no doubt derived its name.

Modern scholars take the region of Mengen, Bolu, Asiatic Turkey to be its modern location.
