= Colopene =

Ancient district in Pontus

Colopene or Culupene or Calupene (Greek: Καλουπηνή), was an ancient district in Pontus on the border of Armenia Minor. Pliny places Sebastia (modern Sivas) and Sebastopolis (modern Sulusaray) in Colopene.
