= Gadilon =

Town in ancient Pontus

Coordinates: 41°34′17″N 35°53′38″E

Gadilon (Ancient Greek: Γαδιλών), also known as Gazelon (Γαζηλών), and possibly Helega, was a town in the north-west of ancient Pontus, in a fertile plain between the Halys River and Amisus. From this town the whole district received the name of Gadilonitis, which is probably the right form, which must, perhaps, be restored in two passages of Strabo, in one of which the common reading is Galaouitis (Γαλαουῖτις), and in the other Gazelotos (Γαζηλωτός).

Its site is located near Bafra in Asiatic Turkey.

== See also ==
Kızılırmak Delta
