= Assuwa =

1400 BC confederation in western Anatolia

Assuwa (Hittite: 𒀸𒋗𒉿, romanized: aš-šu-wa; Mycenaean Greek: 𐀀𐀯𐀹𐀊, romanized: a-si-wi-ja) was a confederation of 22 states in western Anatolia around 1400 BC. The confederation was formed to oppose the Hittite Empire, but was defeated under Tudhaliya I/II. The name was recorded in various centres in Mycenaean Greece as Asiwia, which later acquired the form Asia.

== Name ==
Assuwa has been identified in Egyptian records as isy and a-si-ja and in the contemporary Greek Linear B script with the demonym a-si-ja.

== History ==
=== Late Bronze ===
==== Hittite Middle Kingdom ====
Assuwa appears in the historical record around 1400 BC. It is mentioned in six surviving Hittite documents including the Annals of Tudhaliya I/II, which gives a detailed account of the Assuwans' rebellion and its aftermath.

But when I turned back to Hattusa, then against me these lands declared war: [—]lugga, Kispuwa, Unaliya, [-], Dura, Halluwa, Huwallusiya, Karakisa, Dunda, Adadura, Parista, [ ], [-]waa, Warsiya, Kuruppiya, [-]luissa, Alatra, Mount Pahurina, Pasuhalta, [-], Wilusiya, Taruisa. [These lands] with their warriors assembled themselves ......... and drew up their army opposite me.

— Annals, obv.13'-21', adapted from trans. by Garstang and Gurney (1959: 121-2).

Eric Cline has argued that certain circumstantial evidence suggests that Ahhiyawans may have supported the rebellion. For instance, a sword with a potentially Mycenaean style found at Hattusa bears an inscription suggesting that it was taken from an Assuwan soldier and left as an offering to the Hittite storm god. Some scholars have speculated that certain details in the Iliad could reflect a memory of this conflict, including the seemingly anachronistic character of Ajax as well as references to pre-Trojan War escapades of Bellerophon and Heracles in Anatolia.

== See also ==
- Arzawa
- Ancient regions of Anatolia
- Seha River Land
- Wilusa
