= Caesarea (Cappadocia) =

Ancient city in Asia-Minor, predecessor to modern Kayseri

- Mazaca
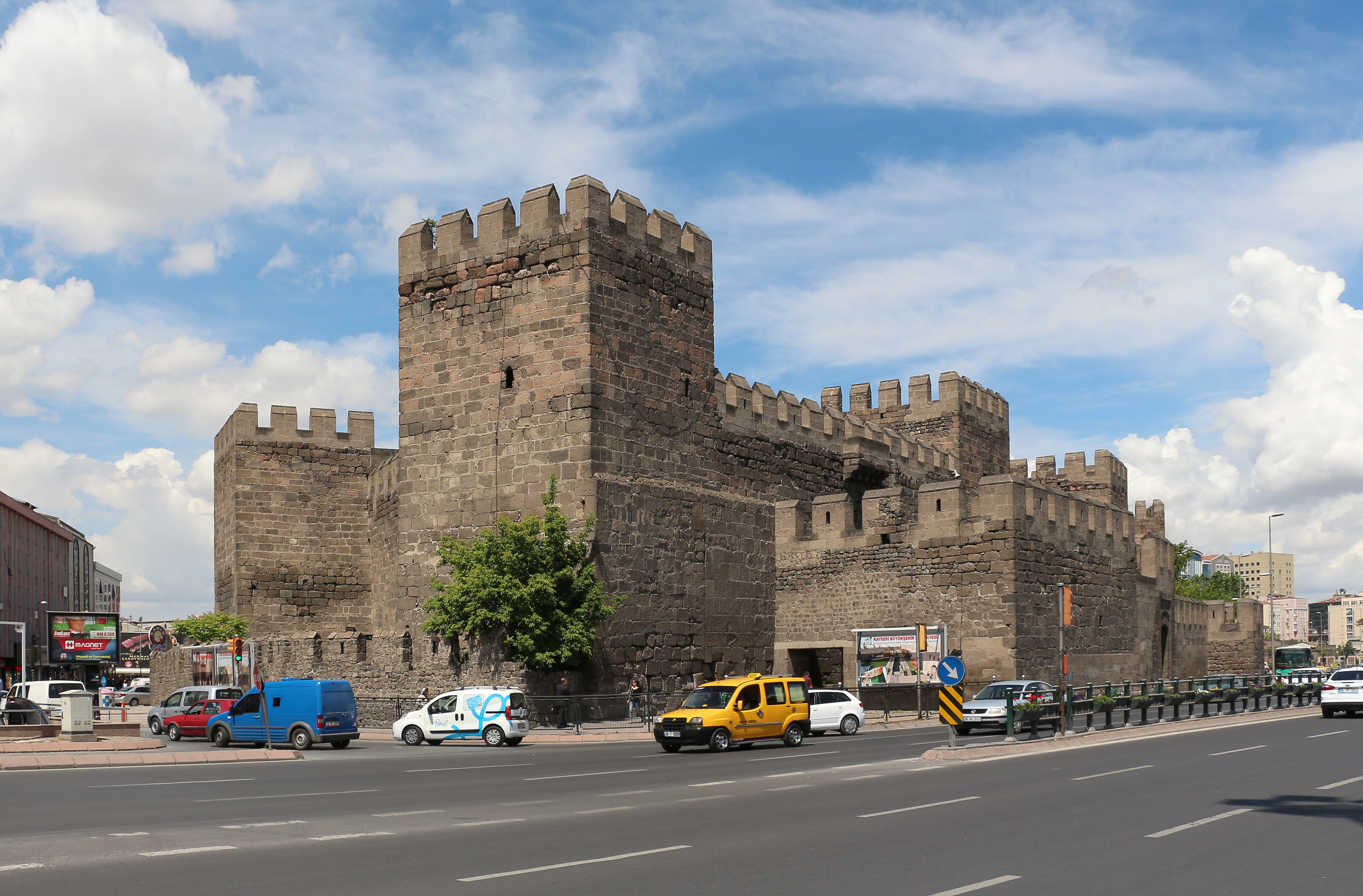
- Kayseri Castle

- Location within Turkey Location within Europe
- 38°43′21″N 35°29′15″E
- Type: Ancient Greek settlement
- Location: Kayseri, Kayseri Province, Turkey
- Region: Cappadocia

History
- Built by: Romans, Byzantines, Greeks
- Abandoned: 11th century

Caesarea (/ˌsɛzəˈriːə, ˌsɛsəˈriːə, ˌsiːzəˈriːə/; Greek: Καισάρεια, romanized: Kaisareia), also known historically as Mazaca or Mazaka (Greek: Μάζακα; Armenian: Մաժաք, probably from Old Iranian for "Mazdā-city"), was an ancient city in what is now Kayseri, Turkey. In Hellenistic and Roman times, the city was an important stop for merchants headed to Europe on the ancient Silk Road. The city was the capital of Cappadocia, and Armenian and Cappadocian kings regularly fought over control of the strategic city. The city was renowned for its bishops of both the Greek Orthodox and Armenian Apostolic churches.

After the Battle of Manzikert where the Byzantine Empire lost to the incoming Seljuk Empire, the city was later taken over by the Sultanate of Rum and became reconfigured over time with the influences of both Islamic and, later, Ottoman architecture.

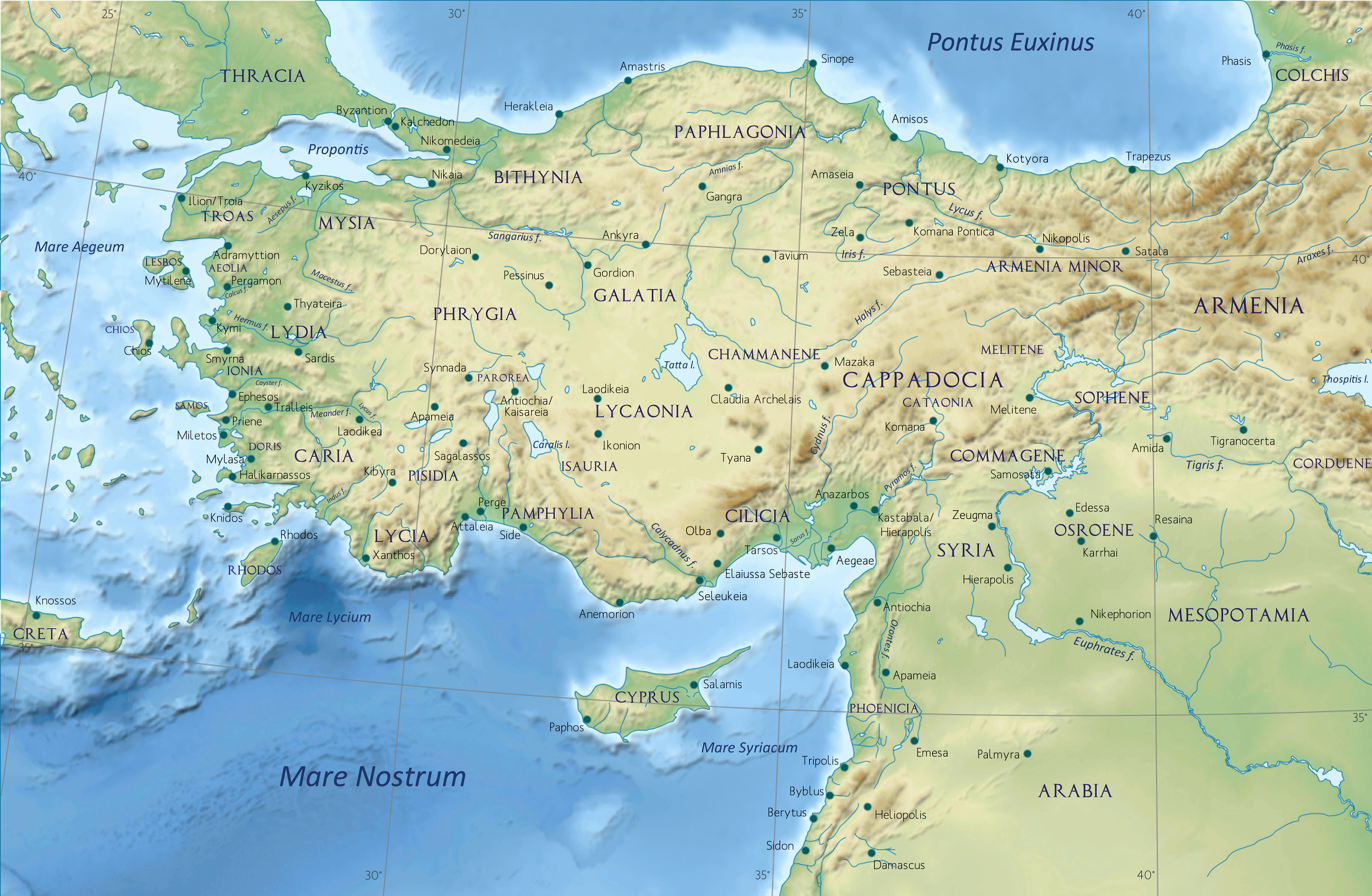
Excerpt, zoom-in, of this part of Greco-Roman Anatolia. To many Romans also called Asia Minor. The city is shown in the north with its name before the alternative from the reign of Julius Caesar. Click for broader map and to enable varied magnification.

== History ==
=== Superseded trading town ===
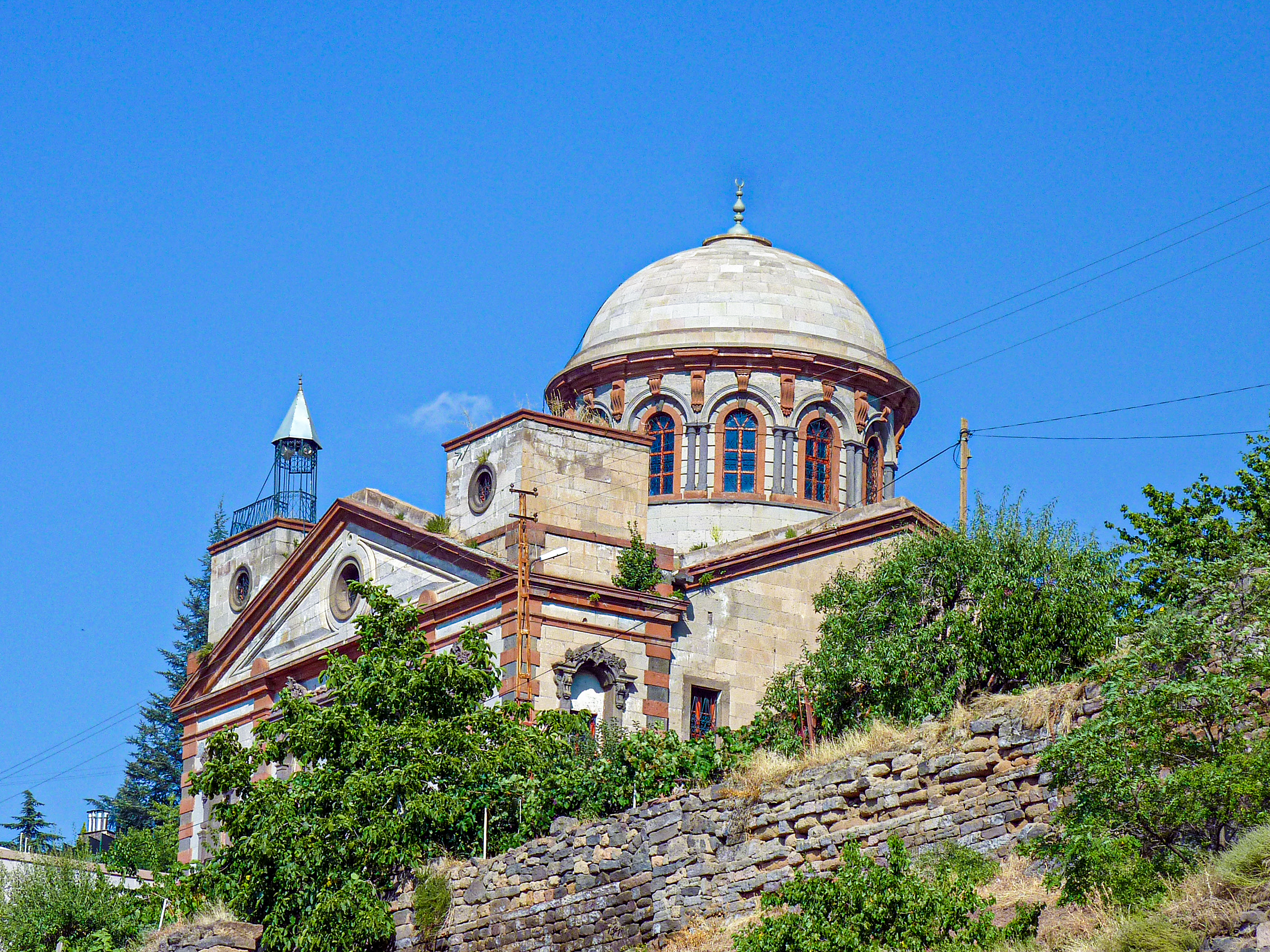
Aya Panagia Greek Church in Talas, Kayseri

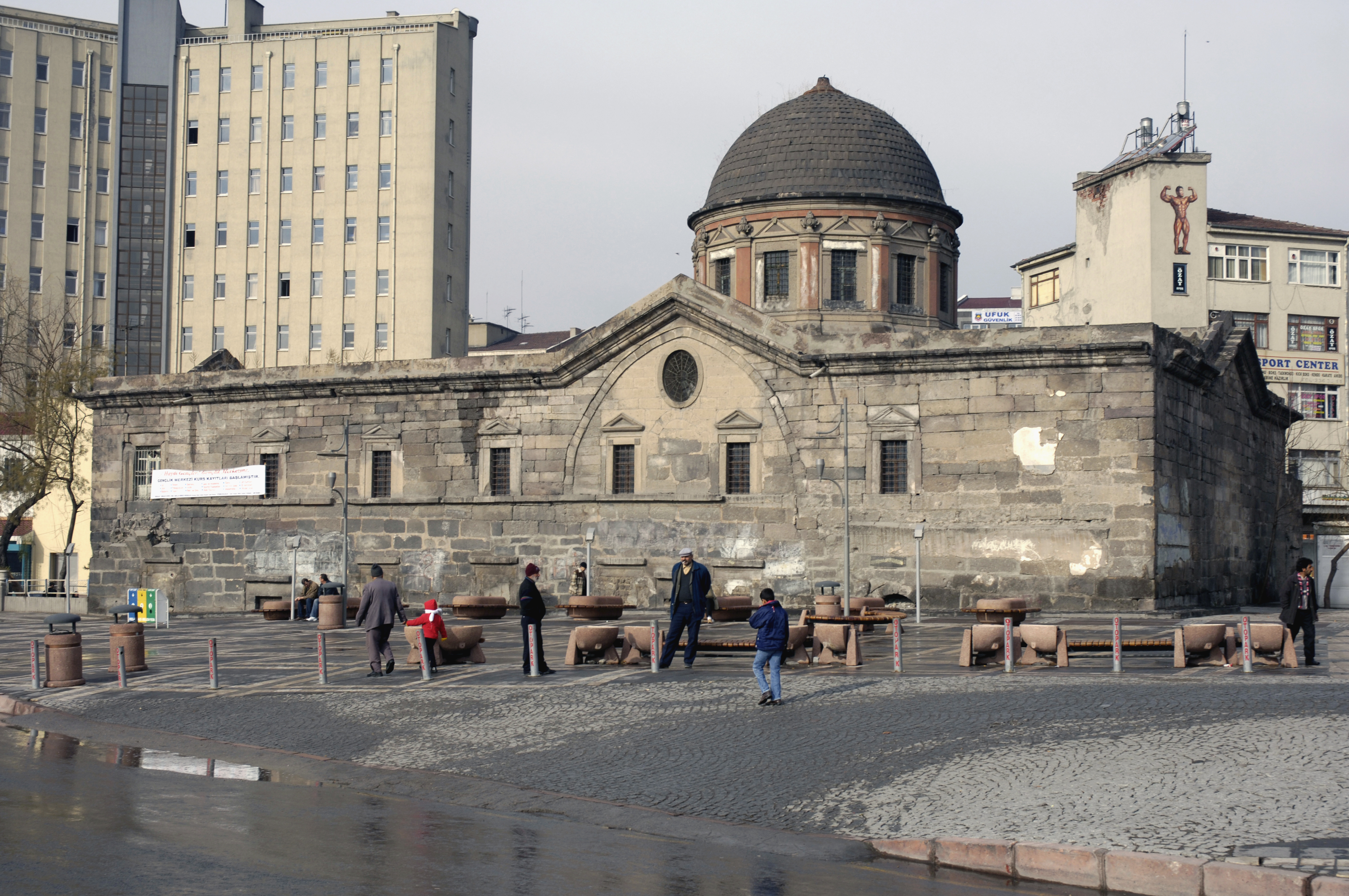
Meryem Ana Kilisesi, meaning 'Virgin Mary Church'

An earlier town or city associated with the Old Assyrian trade network can be traced to 3000 BCE, in ruined Kültepe, 20 km (12 mi) north-east. Findings there include numerous baked-clay tablets, some of which were enclosed in clay envelopes stamped with cylinder seals. The documents record common activities, such as trade between the Assyrian colony and the city-state of Assur and between Assyrian merchants and local people. The trade was run by families rather than the state. The Kültepe texts are the oldest documents of Anatolia. Although they are written in Old Assyrian, the Hittite loanwords and names in the texts are the oldest record of any Indo-European language. Most of the archaeological evidence is typical of Anatolia rather than of Assyria, but the use of both cuneiform and the dialect is the best indication of Assyrian presence.

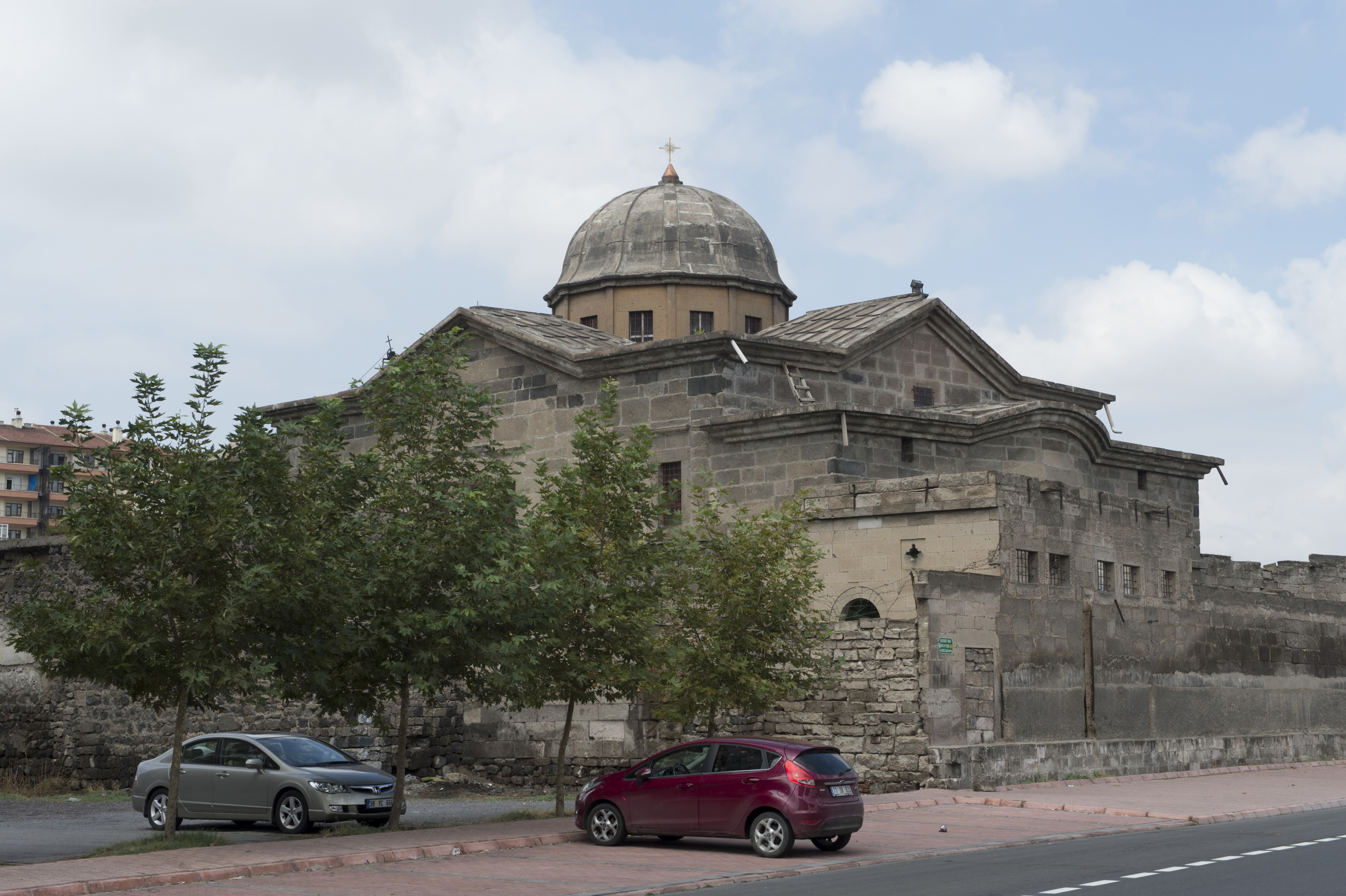
Surp Krikor Lusavorich Armenian Church

=== Achaemenid and Hellenistic times ===
Strabo noted that while Mazaca lacked natural water, walls, and fertile land, nearby Mount Argaios provided plentiful timber, though the forests were underlain by volcanic fire-pits that posed a danger to both inhabitants and livestock. Stone and animal fodder were also found in abundance around the city, but the flooding of the River Melas often made extraction difficult. The inhabitants of Mazaca were called "the Mazaceni." Mazaca may have been the seat of the lieutenant governor of Cataonia.

Mazaca, like the rest of the region, became a part of Alexander the Great's empire in 333 BC. In the turbulent decades that followed his death, the city fell under Antigonus Monophthalmus. Mazaca was subsequently passed to the Seleucid Empire after the Battle of Ipsus.

The system of strategiai into which the Cappadocian Kingdom was divided may derive from earlier Achaemenid hyparchies, or alternatively from the administrative subdivisions imposed during the period of Seleucid rule between roughly 301 and 255 BC. In the Hellenistic period, Mazaca was the principal city in the strategia of Cilicia.

=== Kingdom of Cappadocia ===
It became the centre of an autonomous Greater Cappadocian kingdom under either Ariarathes III or Ariarathes IV of Cappadocia in the later third century BC. In the ensuing period, the city came under the sway of Hellenistic influence, and was given the Greek name of Eusebia (Greek: Εὐσέβεια) in honor of the Cappadocian king Ariarathes V Eusebes Philopator of Cappadocia (163–130 BC). When Tigranes conquered Cappadocia, he forcibly settled the Mazaceni in his newly founded city of Tigranocerta. Some returned to Mazaca after the capture of Tigranocerta by the Roman general Lucullus.

The new name of Caesarea (Greek: Καισάρεια), by which it has since been known, was given to it by the last Cappadocian King Archelaus or perhaps by Tiberius. Caesarea was an inland trading partner for many nearby city-states, and also benefited from links both to the east and the west that gave it, vis-à-vis regional competitors, an advantageous position for trade relations.

=== Roman and Byzantine rule ===
The city passed under formal Roman rule in 17 AD. In the first century of Roman rule, the Caesarea belonged to the only four major cities in the region, together with Koloneia, Melitene and Tyana. The city served as an imperial Roman mint factory and produced zinc and lead from mines of Delikkaya and Aladağ.

Caesarea was destroyed by the Sassanid king Shapur I after his victory over the Emperor Valerian I in 260 AD. At the time it was recorded to have around 40,000 inhabitants. The city gradually recovered, and became home to several early Christian saints: saints Dorothea and Theophilus the martyrs, Gregory of Nazianzus, Gregory of Nyssa, Basil of Caesarea, Andreas (Andrew) and Emmelia of Caesarea. In the 4th century, bishop Basil established an ecclesiastic centre in the suburbs, consisting of numerous charitable institutions (including a system of almshouses, an orphanage, old peoples' homes, and a leprosarium), monasteries and churches, that was later called Basileias. The hypothesis that the modern city of Kayseri, situated about two miles from the site of Caesarea Mazaca, developed around this complex is not confirmed by archaeology. The city was overrun again by the Sasanian general Shahin during the war of 602–628.

It was an important trading centre on the Silk Road.

In the seventh century, the city became part of the Byzantine border region and became a target of the annual razzias the Arabs conducted into Anatolia. As such, it was besieged over 5 times between 646 and 738 and though it was sacked only once by Maslama ibn Abd al-Malik in 725/6, the attacks took a toll on the city and its surrounding. The imperial authorities therefore made Caesarea an aplekton and tenth-century sources indicate arms production in the city. Since the ninth century the city became also the administrative centre as the capital of the Byzantine Theme of Charsianon. Though the city lost most of its importance by the tenth century, is housed probably still around 50,000 people. The city was pillaged, sacked and burnt in 1067 by the invading Seljuks and Turkomans, who enslaved the city's residents. They also plundered the Church of Saint Basil the Great, taking its decorative gold, pearls and gemstones, but failed to destroy the structure itself. In two more instances, in 1069 and after the Battle of Manzikert, the Seljuks returned to the ruins of Caesarea to raid and pillage the surrounding Cappadocian villages.

Kayseri Castle, built in antiquity, and expanded by the Seljuks and Ottomans, is still standing in good condition in the central square of the city.

== Successor city ==
The city has some surviving buildings and is otherwise largely the foundations of what is now Kayseri, Turkey. By the 1920, the foundations of a large cathedral church, used if not built in the tenth century, were the only trace of Byzantine Caesarea.

== Diocese of Caesarea ==
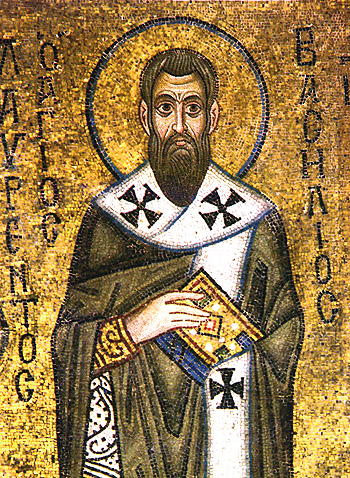
Basil of Caesarea

The diocese of Caesarea was the first of the churches of Asia Minor before the council of Chalcedon (451) and was considered an apostolic see. It possessed wide influence and authority over the diocese of Pontus and Armenia, and tradition held that Gregory the Illuminator had started from here his mission to Armenia.

The city's bishop Eusebius, predecessor to Basil, likely presided over the Synod of Gangra. Another bishop, Thalassius, attended the Second Council of Ephesus in 449 CE and was suspended from the Council of Chalcedon in 451 CE.

A Notitia Episcopatuum composed during the reign of Byzantine Emperor Heraclius in about 640 lists 5 suffragan dioceses of the metropolitan see of Caesarea. A 10th-century list gives it 15 suffragans. In all the Notitiae Caesarea is given the second place among the metropolitan sees of the patriarchate of Constantinople, preceded only by Constantinople itself, and its archbishops were given the title of protothronos, meaning "of the first see" (after that of Constantinople). More than 50 first-millennium archbishops of the see are known by name, and the see itself continued to be a residential see of the Eastern Orthodox Church until 1923, when by order of the Treaty of Lausanne all members of that Church (Greeks) were deported from what is now Turkey. In 1327 Caesarea temporarily received the metropolitanates of Sebasteia, Iconium, Mocissus, and permanently received Euchaita, all of which had declined due to the Anatolian Beyliks. In 1365, Caesarea also temporarily received the metropolitanate of Tyana and in 1370, permanently received Nazianzus. Caesarea was also the seat of an Armenian diocese.

No longer a residential bishopric, Caesarea in Cappadocia is today listed by the Catholic Church as a titular see of the Armenian Catholic Church and the Melkite Catholic Church. It was a titular see of the Roman Church under various names as well, including Caesarea Ponti.

== Notable people ==
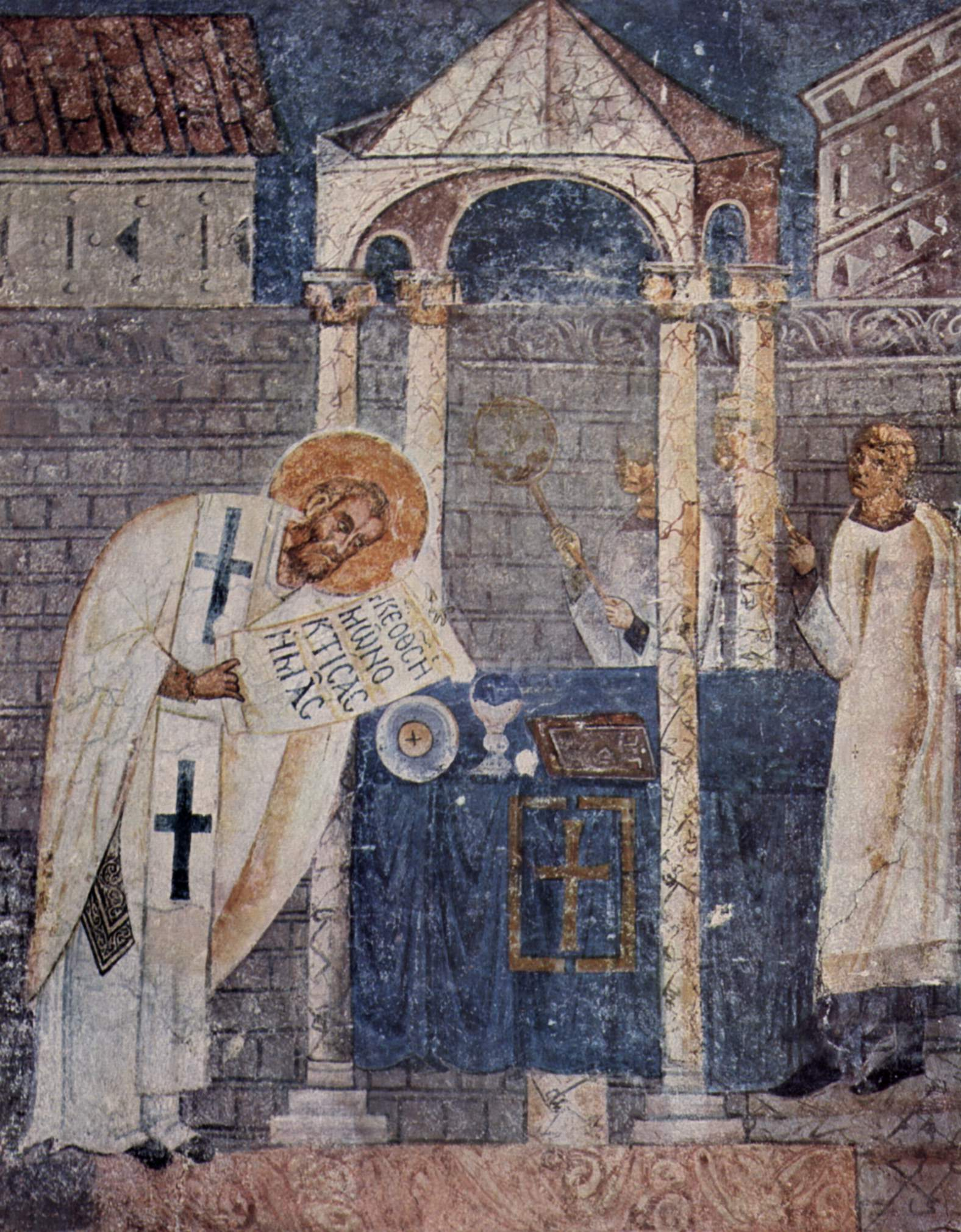
11th-century fresco of Basil the Great in the cathedral of Ohrid

- Prohaeresius (c. 276–368), Armenian Christian teacher and sophist
- Grigoris (died c. 334), Christian Saint and martyr
- Emmelia of Caesarea (died 375), Christian Saint
- Macrina the Younger (c. 327–379), Christian Saint
- Basil the Great (330–379), Christian Saint, theologian and bishop of Caesarea
- Peter of Sebasteia (c. 340 – 391), Christian Saint and bishop of Sebasteia
- Andreas of Caesarea (563–614), theological writer and bishop of Caesarea
- Paisius II (died 1756), Patriarch of Constantinople from 1726–1732, 1740–1743, 1744–1748 and 1751–1752

== Gallery ==
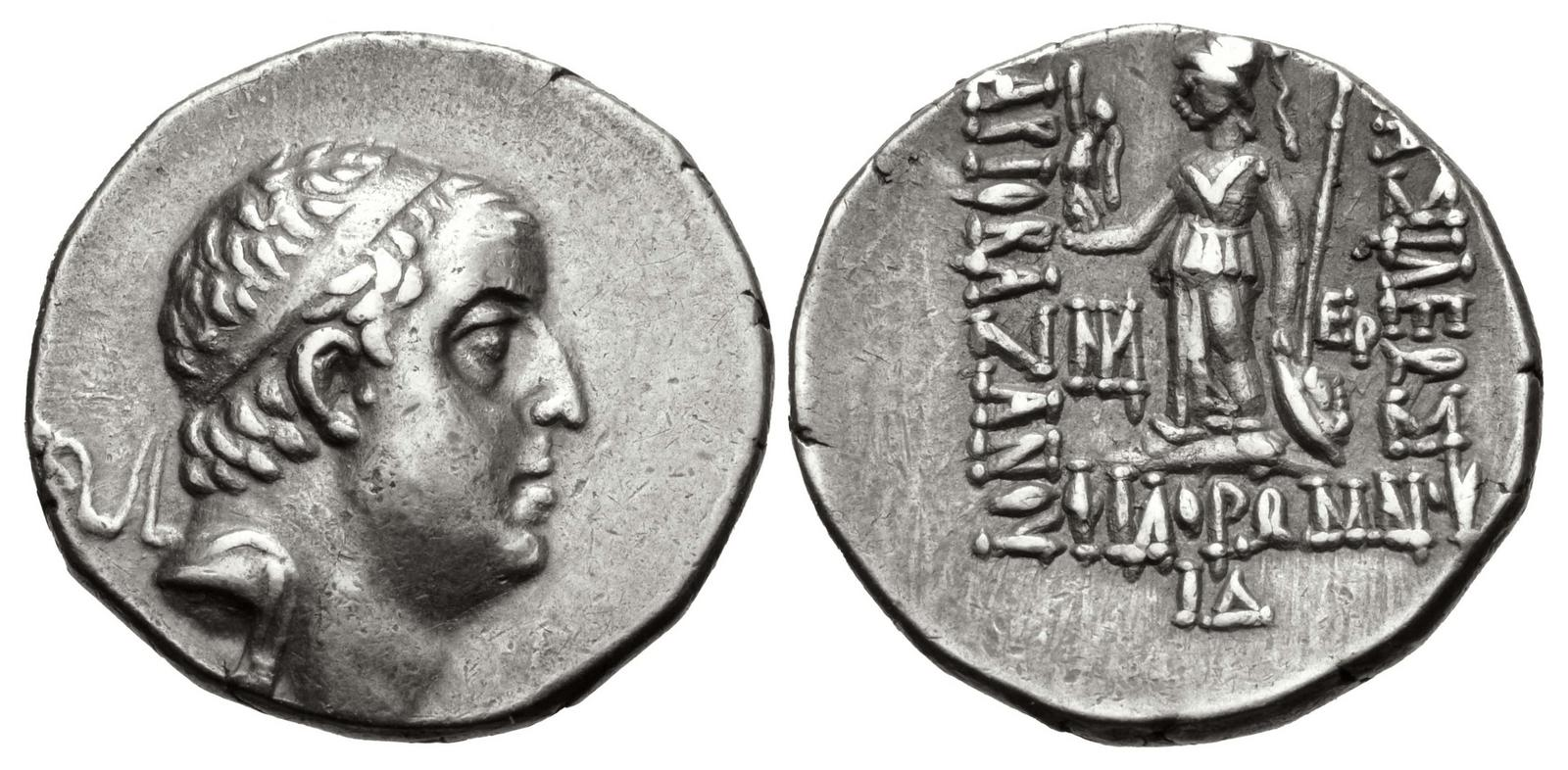
Coin of Ariobarzanes, minted at Mazaca in 83 or 82 BC

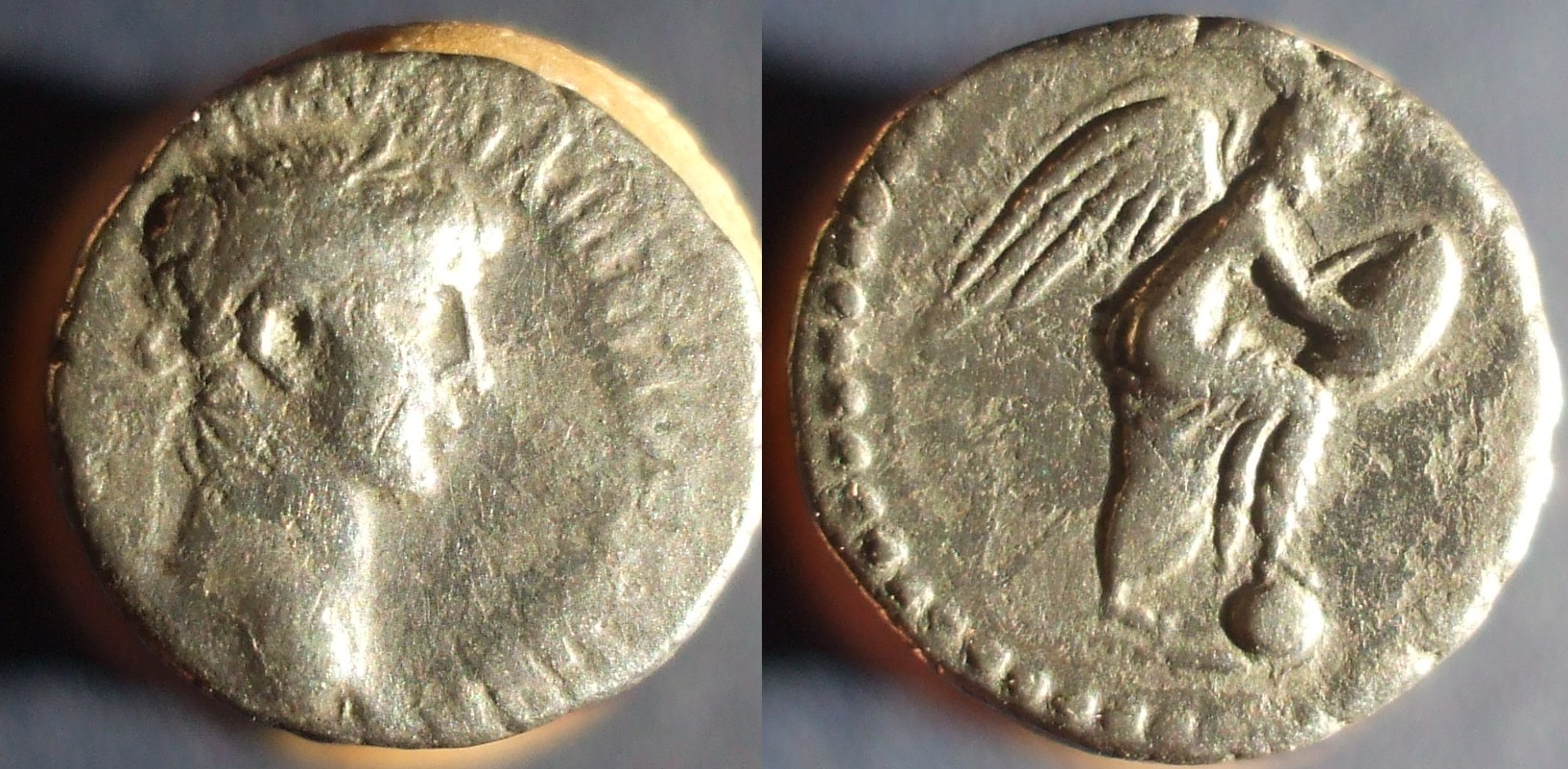
Half-drachma from Caesarea (Mazaca) of Nero (reigned 37 to 68 CE)

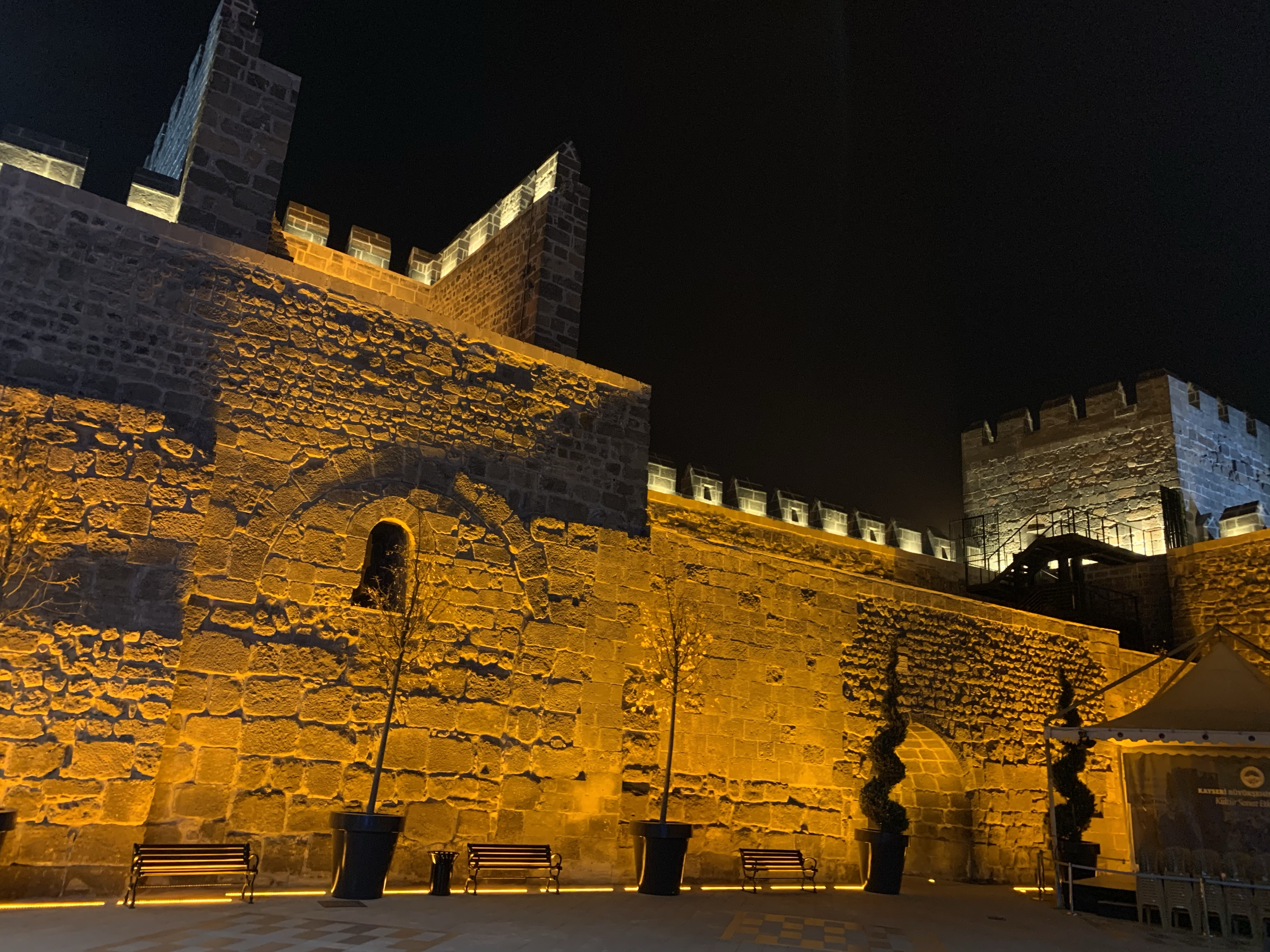
The foundations of this building, Kayseri Castle / Fortress of Kayseri retains some city walls, both date to the Roman era

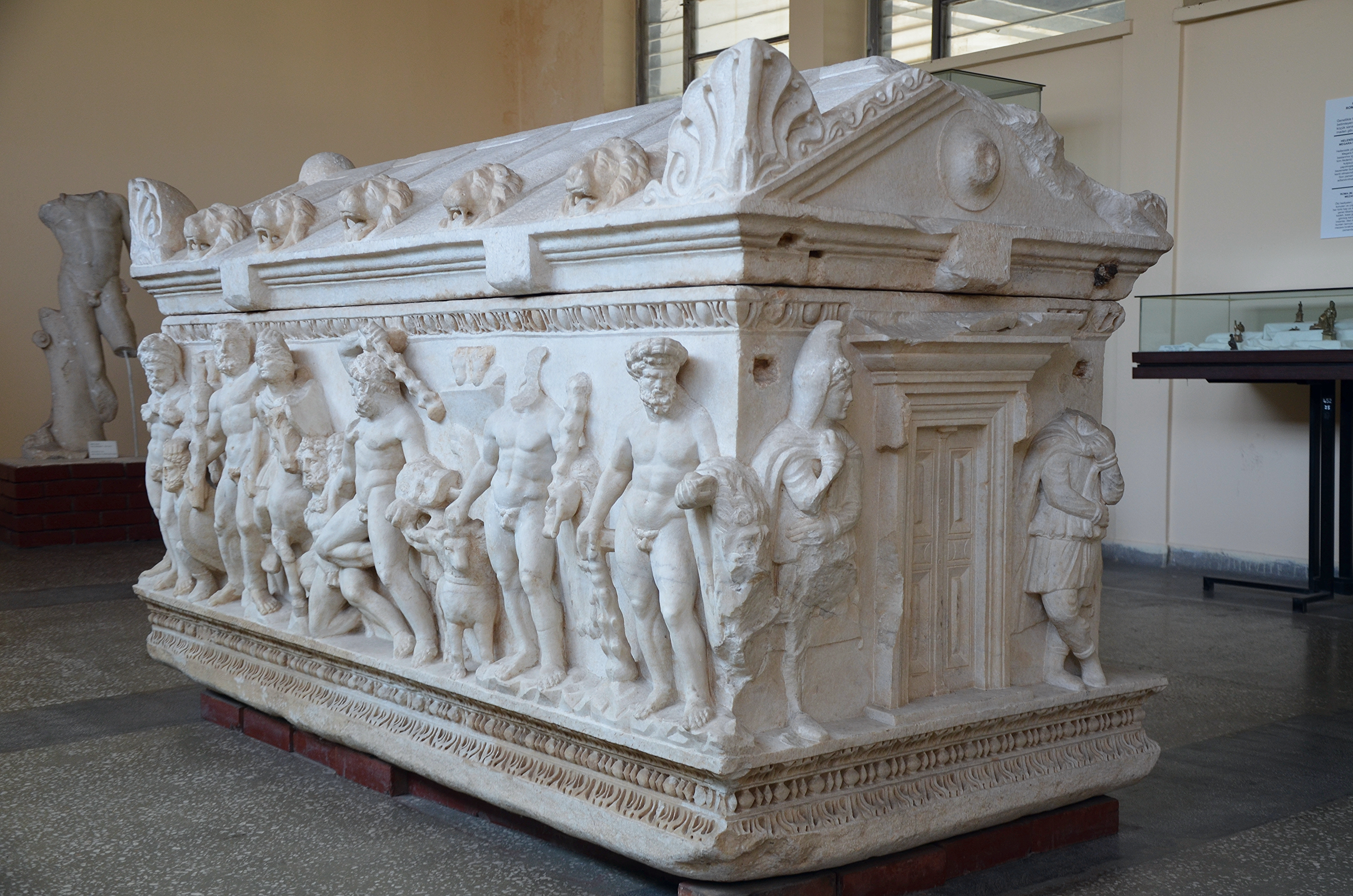
This sarcophagus of the Twelve Labors of Hercules at Kayseri Archaeology Museum dates to 150-160 CE

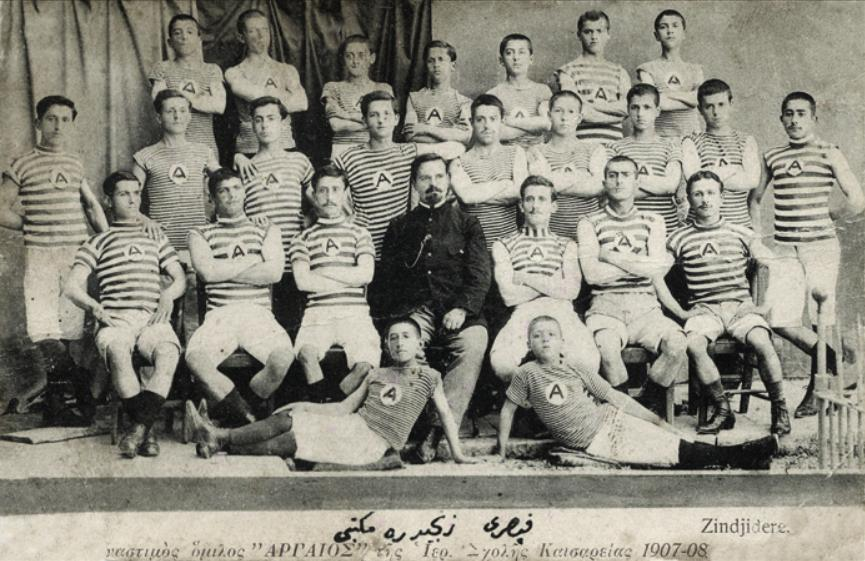
Cappadocian Greeks in Kayseri

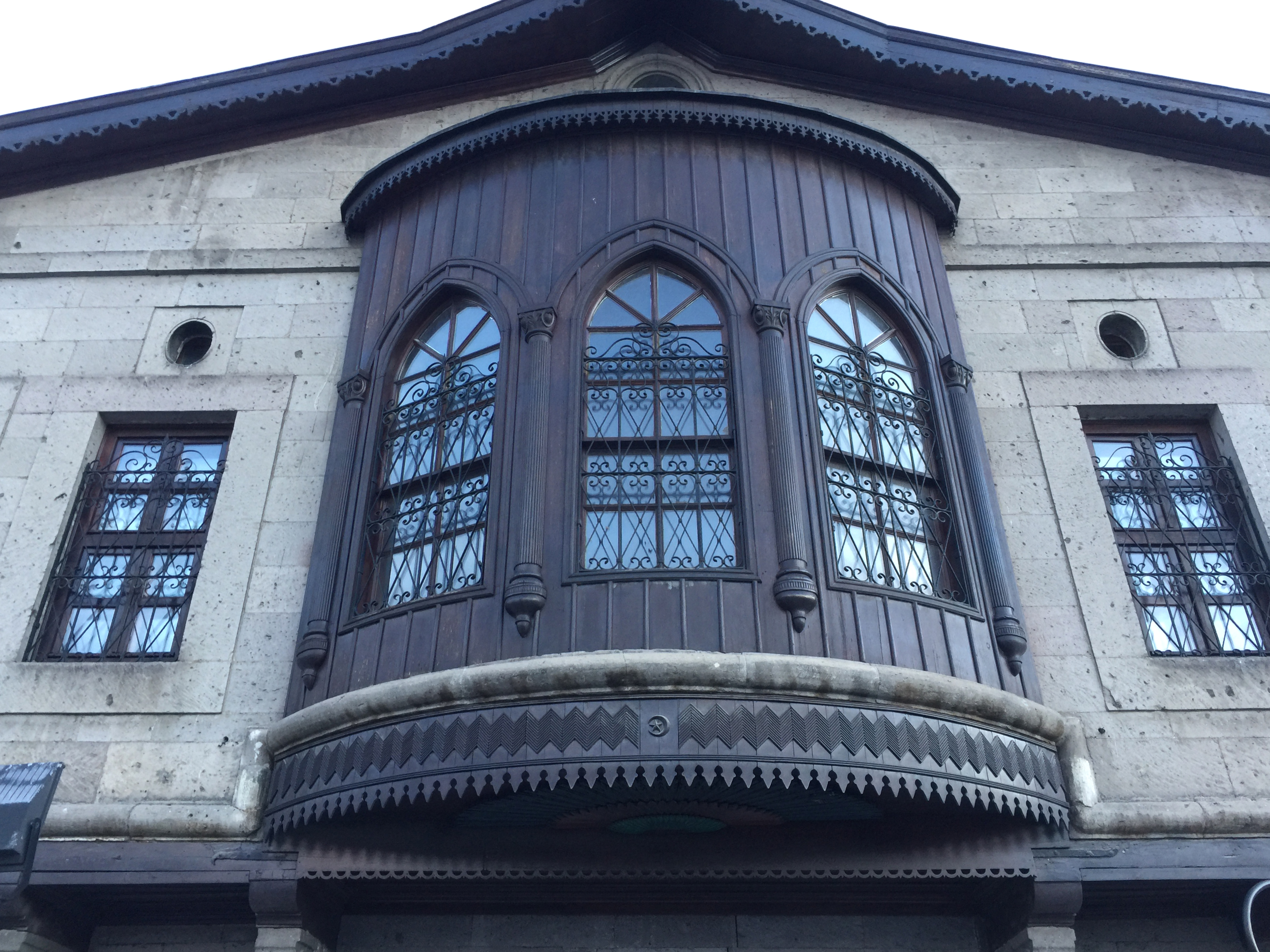
House in Kayseri from an earlier period

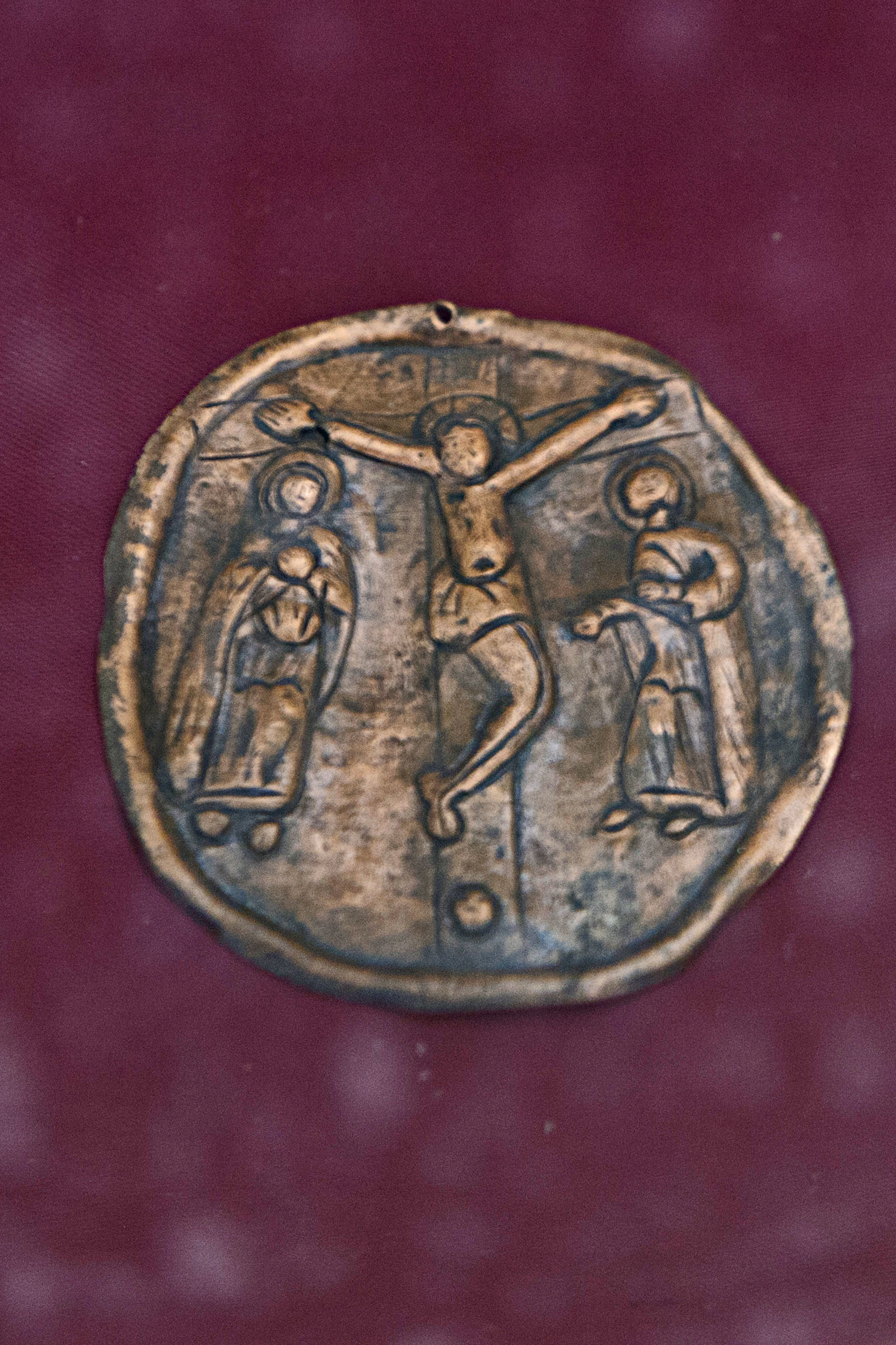
Coin from Kayseri Archaeological Museum

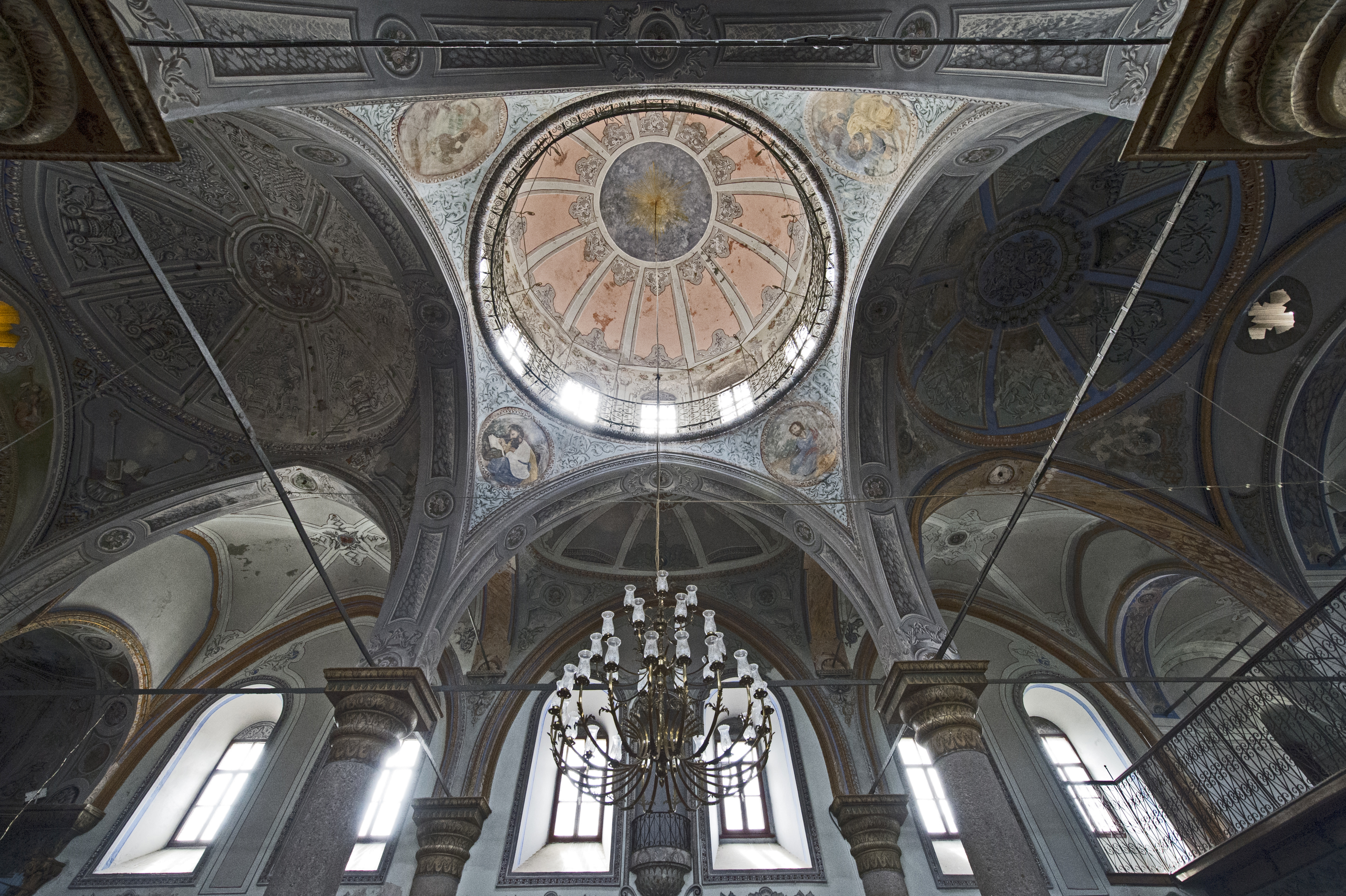
Surp Kirkor Lusavoric Armenian Church dome and ceiling

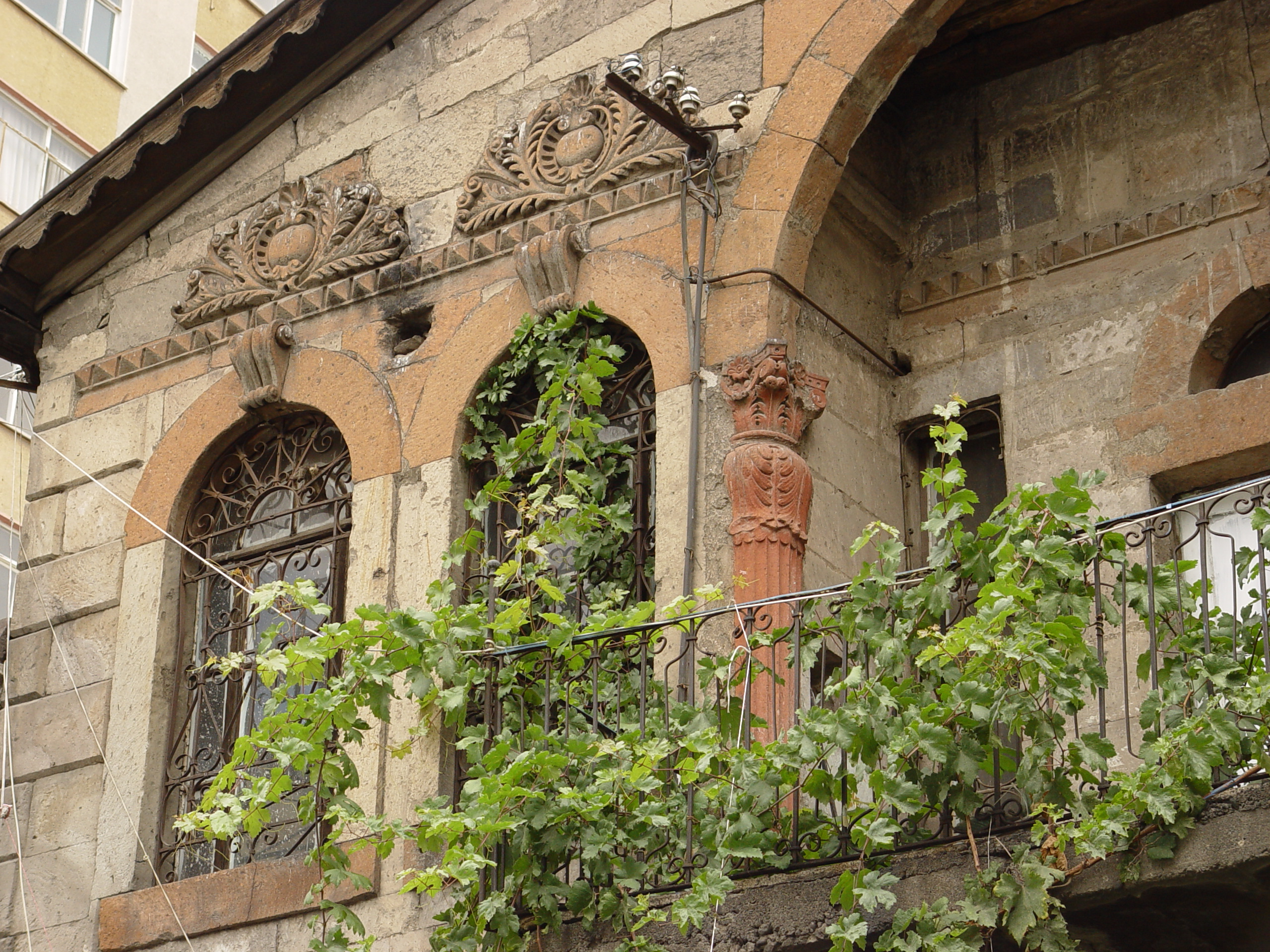
Architectural style

== See also ==
- Kaisariani

== Bibliography ==
- Cooper, Eric; Decker, Michael J. (24 July 2012). Life and Society in Byzantine Cappadocia. Springer. ISBN 978-1-137-02964-5.
