= Ḫarapšili =

- Princess and Queen consort of the Hittites
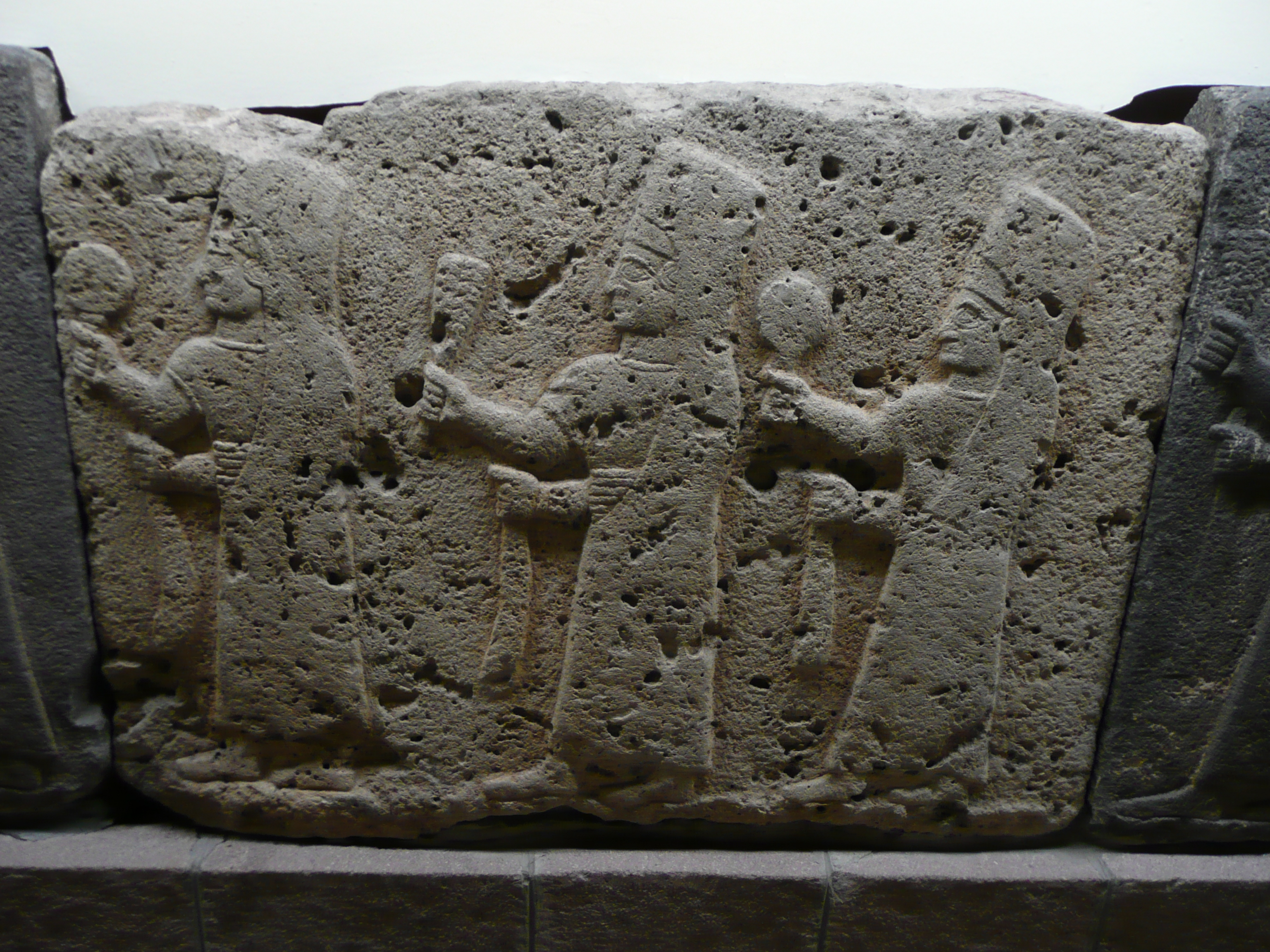
- Relief of Hittite women, likely noble ladies
- Predecessor: Kali
- Spouse: Hantili I
- Issue: Daughter
- Father: Maratti
- Mother: Ḫaštayara
- Religion: Hittite mythology

Ḫarapšili (or Ḫarapsili, Harapšili; "š" is pronounced as "s" in "sun") was a Hittite queen during the Old Kingdom of Hittites.

== Biography ==
=== Family ===
Ḫarapšili was probably a daughter of princess Ḫaštayara and a man called Maratti. Her grandfather was king Hattusili I and her brother was king Mursili I (c. 1556 – 1526 BC).

=== Marriage ===
She married a cupbearer named Hantili I. He conspired with Zidanta I and assassinated Mursili, thereafter taking the throne.

The royal blood was preserved in the female line.

She was a mother of one daughter who married Zidanta who became a king.

=== Death ===
Ḫarapšili died in Sugziya.

== In myth ==
In one myth is mentioned "The Storm God of Queen Harapsili". This is mentioned in Hittite myths, a book by Harry A. Hoffner.

== See also ==
- List of Hittite kings
