= Tabarna =

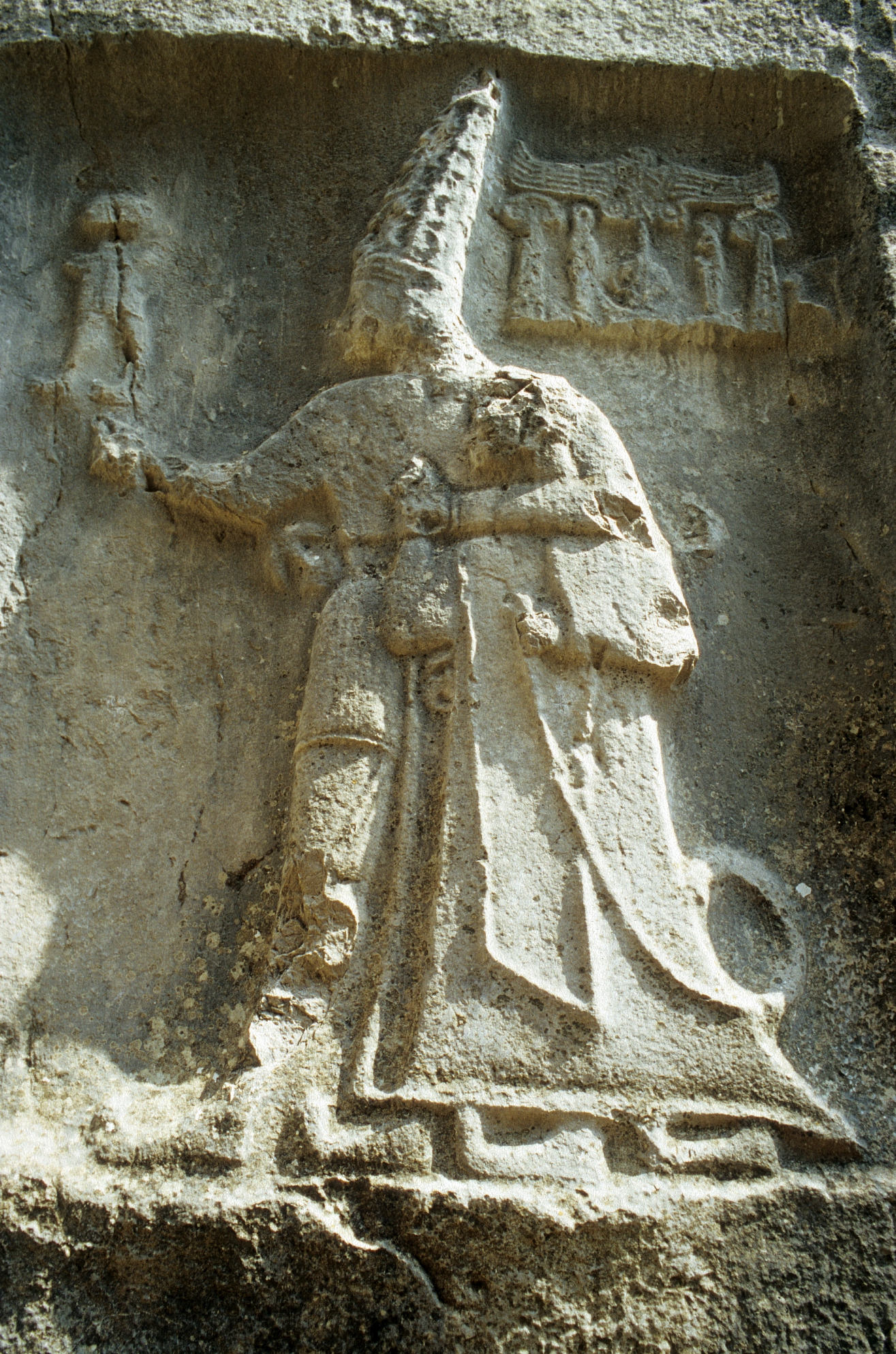
Relief of Tudhaliya IV at Hattusa Yazılıkaya, with the inscription "Great King, Labarna, Tudhaliya" written in Anatolian hieroglyphs in the upper right corner

Tabarna or Labarna was a royal title used by the Hittites. It was used from at least the 17th century BC until the end of the Hittite empire, except for the brief period from Suppiluliuma I to Muwatalli II. It was in origin possibly a personal name, borne by the first two Hittite kings, Labarna I and Labarna II. In that regard, it is comparable to the Latin title caesar. Its etymology, however, is uncertain. Ilya Yakubovich calls it "the single most discussed word of the Hittite lexicon".
