= Edict =

Announcement of a law, often associated with monarchism

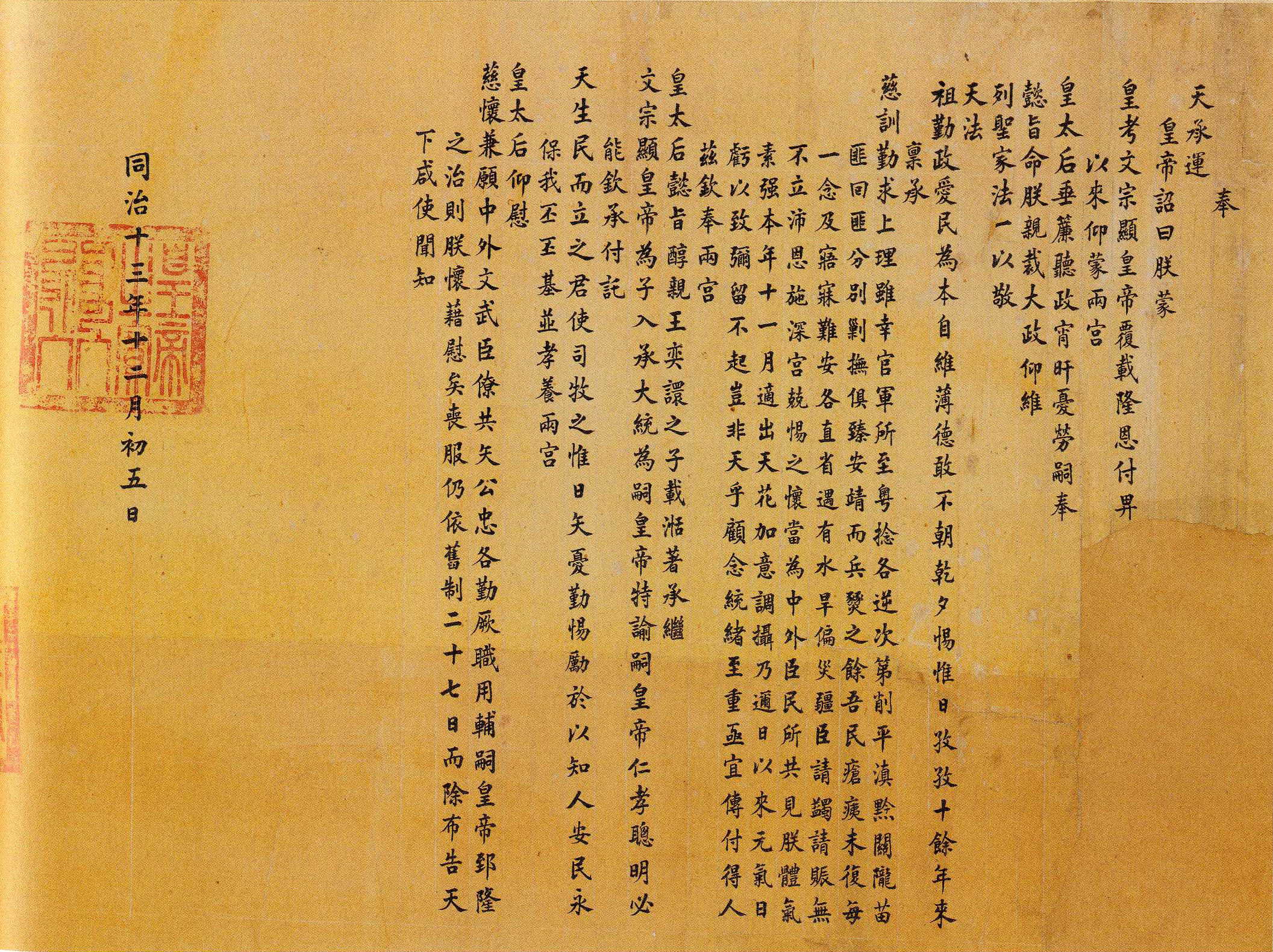
Edict of the Tongzhi Emperor in 1874

An edict is a decree or announcement of a law, often associated with monarchies, but it can be under any official authority. Synonyms include "dictum" and "pronouncement". Edict derives from the Latin edictum, which itself is composed of the parts e-dicere, "to speak out" in the sense of "proclaiming" in speech.

== Analysis ==
By extension it is defined as a type of decree or order issued with particular formality and ceremony, but also, conversely, a demand — like a diktat — to which is attributed the negative meaning of top-down control (for example the use of the recent expression Editto bulgaro in Italy) by reference to a dictatorial system

== Notable edicts ==
- Telepinu Proclamation, by Telipinu, king of the Hittites. Written c. 1550 BC, it helped archeologists to construct a succession of Hittite Kings. It also recounts Mursili I's conquest of Babylon.
- Edicts of Ashoka, by the Mauryan emperor, Ashoka, during his reign from 272 BC to 231 BC.
- Reform of Roman Calendar, Julian Calendar, took effect on 1 January AUC 709 (45 BC).
- Edictum perpetuum (129), an Imperial revision of the long-standing Praetor's Edict, a periodic document which first began under the late Roman Republic (c. 509–44 BC).
- Edict on Maximum Prices (301), by Roman Emperor Diocletian. It attempted to reform the Roman system of taxation and to stabilize the coinage.
- Edict of Serdica (311), by Galerius before his death. This proclamation removed all previous restrictions on the Christian religion, allowing it and all other religions to be practiced throughout the Roman Empire.
- Edict of Milan (313), by Constantine the Great, and Licinius, the Eastern tetrarch. It declared that the Roman Empire would be neutral with regard to religious worship, officially ending all government-sanctioned religious persecution, especially of Christianity.
- Edict of Paris (614), by Clotaire II of Neustria. It tried to establish order by standardising the appointment process for public officials across the realm. It guaranteed the nobility their ancient rights, and in this respect has been seen as a French Magna Carta.
- Edict of Pistres (864), by Charles the Bald. It reformed the West Frankish army and laid the foundations for the famous French chivalry of the High Middle Ages. It also ordered the construction of fortified bridgeheads to deal with Viking raiders.
- Edict on the Transfer of the Capital (1010), by Lý Thái Tổ, founder of the Lý dynasty. The capital of Đại Cồ Việt was shifted from Hoa Lư to Đại La as a result.
- Edict of Expulsion (1290), by King Edward I of England. It ordered the expulsion of all Jews from England and the confiscation of their real property.
- Edict of Worms (1521), by the Diet of Worms, with Holy Roman Emperor Charles V presiding. It declared Martin Luther to be an outlaw and banned the reading or possession of his writings. The edict permitted anyone to kill Luther without legal consequence.
- Edict of Saint-Germain (1562), by Catherine de' Medici, Queen of France, in January 1562. It was an edict of toleration that recognized the existence of the Protestants and guaranteed freedom of conscience and private worship. It forbade Huguenot worship within towns (where conflicts flared up too easily), but permitted Protestant synods and consistories.
- Edict of Nantes (1598), by King Henry IV of France. It granted all of the above listings the French Protestants (also known as Huguenots) substantial rights in France, a Catholic nation.
- Edict of Restitution (1629), by Holy Roman Emperor Ferdinand II. It attempted to restore the religious and territorial settlement after the Peace of Augsburg (1555). It forbade the secularization of land and property belonging to the Catholic Church.
- Sakoku Edict (1635), the third of a series issued by Tokugawa Iemitsu, shōgun of Japan from 1623 to 1651. The Edict of 1635 is considered a prime example of the Japanese desire for isolationism (sakoku). This decree is one of the many acts that were written by Iemitsu to eliminate Catholic influence, and enforced strict government rules and regulations to impose these ideas. The Edict of 1635 was written to the two commissioners of Nagasaki, a port city located in southwestern Japan.
- Edict of Fontainebleau (1685), by Louis XIV of France. It revoked the Edict of Nantes (1598) and ordered the destruction of Huguenot churches.
- Sacred Edict (1670), by the Kangxi Emperor of the Qing dynasty of China. Made up of 16 maxims, it served to instruct the average Chinese people of the basic principles of Confucianism. The Sacred Edict was subsequently expanded upon in a separate edict issued by the Yongzheng Emperor in 1724.
- A French edict by Finance Minister Colbert (17th century) was intended to improve the quality of cloth. This law declared that if a merchant's cloth was not found to be satisfactory on three occasions, then he was to be tied to a post with the cloth attached to him.
- Edict of Gülhane (1839), Ottoman edict that ushered in the Tanzimât period
- Edict of Toleration (1839), by King Kamehameha III of Hawaii. It allowed for the establishment of the Catholic Church in Hawaii.
- Hatt-ı Hümayun of 1856 (Reform Edict of 1856) by Ottoman Sultan Abdülmecid I, promised equality in education, government appointments, and administration of justice to all regardless of creed.
- Imperial Decree of the Declaration of War Against Foreign Powers (1900), issued in the name of the Guangxu Emperor of the Qing dynasty of China, declared war against the Russian Empire, the United States of America, the United Kingdom of Great Britain and Ireland, the Empire of Japan, the French Republic, the German Empire, the Kingdom of Italy, the Kingdom of Spain, the Austro-Hungarian Monarchy, the Kingdom of Belgium, and the Netherlands simultaneously, which culminated in the Eight-Nation Alliance Invasion.
- Imperial Edict of the Abdication of the Qing Emperor (1912), issued in the name of the Xuantong Emperor of the Qing dynasty of China, marked the end of the dynasty and 2133 years of imperial rule in China, whilst simultaneously transferred the sovereignty of China (including Manchuria, Mongolia, Xinjiang, and Tibet) to the nascent Republic of China.

== See also ==
- Edict of government, a category of uncopyrightable works according to the US Copyright Office
- Decree
- Fatwa
- Firman
- Jarlig
- Official communications of the Chinese Empire
- Proclamation
- Rescript
- All articles on English Wikipedia starting with "Edict"
