= Labarna I =

Traditional first king of the Hittites (c. 17th century BC)

Labarna
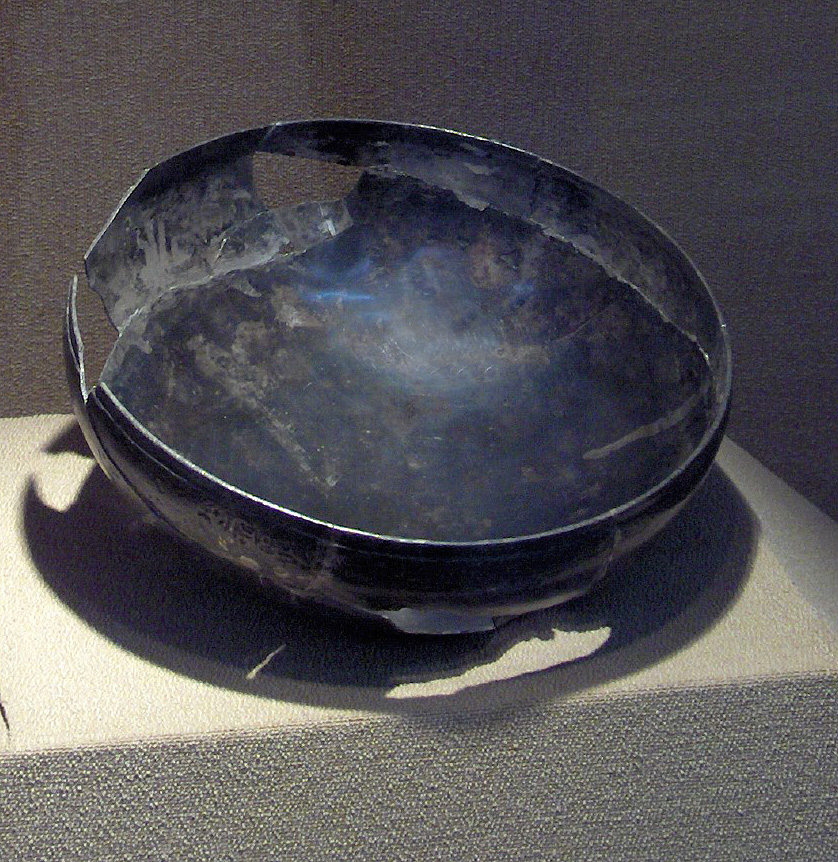
- Silver bowl mentioning Labarna
- Occupation: King of Hittite empire
- Spouse: Tawannanna
- Children: several sons

Labarna was the traditional first king of the Hittites, c. early 17th century BC (middle chronology), the most accepted chronology nowadays. He was the traditional founder of the Hittite Old Kingdom. His wife was Tawananna.

The existence of Labarna is questioned by some modern scholars. Labarna was also a title of early Hittite rulers, such as Hattusili I. Given the relatively few contemporaneous references to Labarna personally, some scholars have suggested that pioneering Hittitologists may have erred in assuming that Labarna was the personal name of a king. According to this theory, the first Labarna (in the sense of a title) was actually Hattusili I, who is normally regarded as the second Labarna.

Tabarna, a variant of Labarna, is mentioned often in Hattian, Hittite, Hurrian and Akkadian texts from the Hittite archives.

== Biography ==
Labarna was not the first in line to the throne. PU-Sarruma designated Labarna as his successor after his own sons revolted against him. Upon PU-Sarruma's death, Labarna and Papahdilmah, one of PU-Sarruma's sons, contended for the throne, with Labarna emerging victorious.

What little is known about him is culled mainly from the Telepinu Proclamation, which states that he overwhelmed his enemies and "made them borders of the sea", a statement which may refer to conquests as far as the Mediterranean coast in the south, and the Black Sea in the north.

Labarna installed his sons as governors in several cities including Tuwanuwa, Hupisna, Landa, and Lusna (the identities of these cities are uncertain, but thought to perhaps be Tyana, Heraclea Cybistra, Laranda, and Lystra). Through his conquests, he was responsible for laying the groundwork for the Hittite empire that was to come.

== See also ==
- History of the Hittites

Preceded by PU-Sarruma (?)	Hittite king c. early 16th century BC	Succeeded by Hattusili I
