= Šinahuttum =

Possible ancient city in Assyria

- Sanahuitta
- Location within Turkey
- 40°01′11″N 34°36′55″E (approximate)
- Type: Town
- Periods: Bronze Age
- Cultures: Assyrians
- Location: Near Boğazkale, Çorum Province, Turkey
- Region: Anatolia

Šinahuttum, later known as Sanahuitta, was a Bronze Age Assyrian city believed to have been northeast of Hattusa, the capital of the Hittite Empire in the late Bronze Age, near modern Boğazkale in Turkey. The city is mentioned in Assyrian sources 14 times and was noted for its donkey market and wool exchange.

== Location ==
The likely location of Šinahuttum was identified by historians using statistical methods to interrogate the records of merchants found at Kaneš near the modern Turkish city of Kayseri.

== The site in early times ==
It was mentioned first as Sinahuttum in the Assyrian Colony text C18, along with other cities as Ankuwa and Kapitra which rebelled against Hattusa in Late Bronze Age period. It was part of the Hittite kingdom, as is commented in text C17.

In early times, king Labarna I was the sovereign of the small city-state of Kussara, who during his campaigns to enlarge his territory went to the northeast of Kussara and conquered the city-state of Sanahuitta. Then he set up one of his sons as governor of the city, but the inhabitants rebelled and elected Papahdilmah as their authority. After Papahdilmah took the throne of Samahuitta in a coup, the Hittite state was divided in two, with one faction ruling from Samahuitta and the other controlling the southern territory from Kussara. Sanahuitta was apparently independent until Hattusili I, in his first campaign, sacked the surrounding territory, but not conquered the city itself, what he did three years later, after a siege of six months.
