= Daduhepa =

14th century BC Hittite queen

Queen consort of Hittite
- Tenure: c. 1400 BC

Daduhepa (also written Daduḫepa or Duduḫepa; fl. c. 1400 BC) was a Hittite queen (Tawananna) who reigned in the 15th or 14th century BC. Her lineage is obscure, but she is believed to have been the consort of either Tudḫaliya I or Šuppiluliuma I.

== Biography ==
Daduhepa was one of the queens of the Hittite New Kingdom, and was one of the first Hittite queens to have a Hurrian name after Hittite incorporated that group into their kingdom.

In some sources, Daduhepa is stated to have been a wife of Šuppiluliuma I along with Henti, who also had a Hurrian name. In this case, she would have had the sons Arnuwanda II and Muršili II.

In more recent studies, evidence points to Daduhepa being the consort of Šuppiluliuma's father, who is known as Tudḫaliya or Tašmišarri. Because she was written about as being queen during her son's rule, Daduhepa is believed to have outlived her husband and maintained her status of queen, as per the Tawananna tradition. She has been found depicted and named on several seals alongside her son Šuppiluliuma. She retained her status until her death around 1345 BC, after which Henti, the first wife of Šuppiluliuma, assumed the title of Tawananna and the queenship.
