= Huzziya I =

- Predecessor: Ammuna
- Successor: Telepinu
- Parent: King Ammuna
- Relatives: Zidanta I (grandfather); Sister

Huzziya I was a king of the Hittites (Old Kingdom), ruling for 5 years, ca. 1530–1525 BC (middle chronology) or 1466–1461 BC (short chronology).

== Biography ==
According to the Telepinu Proclamation, at the time of the death of Ammuna, the assassins killed Titiya and Hantili, and so Huzziya became the king. Based on this text, most scholars assume that Titiya and Hantili were sons of Ammuna, and were killed to make way for his second-rank son Huzziya's accession to the throne.

Huzziya had a sister, Isparaya, who was married to Telepinu. Telepinu deposed Huzziya and sent them into exile. According to Trevor R. Bryce, Huzziya was just a usurper, and Telepinu was a son of Ammuna, and Telepinu's phrase that he "sat on the throne of his father" could be understood literally.

Eventually, Huzziya was killed during Telepinu's reign, but against Telepinu's orders.

Preceded by Ammuna	Hittite king ca. 1530–1525 BC	Succeeded by Telipinu
