= PU-Sarruma =

- Other names: Hišmi-Šarruma
- Occupation: King of Hittites
- Children: Papahdilmah; Tawannanna
- Parent: Tudhaliya

PU-Sarruma (PU-LUGAL-ma, ^{m}PU-Šàr-(rù)-ma, possibly representing Hišmi-Šarruma) is a conjectured pre-Empire king of the Hittites. The conjecture was forwarded by Emil Forrer and is not commonly accepted.

He would have reigned in the early 17th century BC (middle chronology) or around 1600 BC (short chronology).

== Family ==
Hišmi-Šarruma would correspond to the grandfather of Hattusili I and the father-in-law of Labarna I and true father of Papahdilmah, mentioned (but not by name) by Hattusili. Hišmi-Šarruma was also a father of Tawannanna.

His name contains the element Šarruma which refers to a Hurrian deity.

== Reign ==
Virtually nothing is known of PU-Šarruma's life, who is a very shadowy figure. PU-Šarruma's sons had turned against their father, so that, while he was in the city of Šanahwitta, he named his son-in-law Labarna as his successor. However, Papahdilmah still had support among the king's servants and chief officers.

He is primary attested by the "Testament of Hattusili I".

== See also ==
- History of the Hittites

== Sources ==
| Preceded by Tudhaliya (?) | Hittite king ca. 1600 BC | Succeeded by Labarna I |
