= Hantili I =

King of the Hittites from 1590-1560 BC

- The approximate extent of the Hittite Old Kingdom under Hantili I is shown in red.
- Predecessor: Mursili I
- Successor: Zidanta I
- Spouse: Queen Ḫarapšili
- Children: Daughter
- Relatives: Ammuna (grandson)

Hantili I was a king of the Hittites during the Hittite Old Kingdom. His reign lasted for 30 years, from c. 1590 to c. 1560 BC (middle chronology).

== Biography ==
=== Rise to power ===
According to the Telepinu Proclamation, Hantili was the royal cup-bearer to Mursili I, king of the Hittites. Hantili was married to Ḫarapšili, Mursili's sister. Around the year 1590 B.C., Hantili, with the help of Zidanta, his son-in-law, assassinated Mursili. Afterwards, Hantili succeeded him as king of the Hittites.

=== Reign ===
There are only a few scattered sources left that describe the reign of Hantili. During his reign, he continued the militaristic traditions of the kings before him. One of Hantili's main concerns was maintaining Hittite control in Syria. He journeyed to the city of Carchemish to conduct a military campaign, most likely against the Hurrians, longtime enemies of the Hittites. The success of this campaign is unknown.

After the conclusion of this campaign, he made his return journey to Hattusa, the Hittite capital. While on this journey, he reached the city of Tegarama, which is possibly the modern-day Turkish city of Gürün. At this point, the Telepinu Proclamation states that Hantili started to regret that he had killed Mursili, saying to himself, "What is this (that) I have done? [Why] did I listen to [the words of] Zidanta, my [son-in-law]? As soon as] he reigned [as king], the gods sought (justice for) the blood of Muršili."

== Family ==
Hantili's parents are not known. His wife was Queen Ḫarapšili, and they had at least one daughter. Hantili's grandson was Ammuna, who killed Zidanta.

== See also ==
- History of the Hittites
- List of Hittite kings

== Notes ==
| Preceded by Mursili I | Hittite king ca. 1590–1560 BC | Succeeded by Zidanta I |
