= Ammuna =

- Predecessor: Zidanta I
- Successor: Huzziya I
- Children: Tittiya; King Huzziya I Ištapariya
- Parent: King Zidanta I

Ammuna was a King of the Hittites ca. 1550–1530 BC (middle chronology) or 1486–1466 BC (short chronology timeline). The land seems to have suffered badly during his reign, and he lost a considerable amount of territory.

== Biography ==
=== Family ===
Ammuna was the son of the King Zidanta I and grandson of Hantili I. He killed his father to become a king and had a large family.

=== Reign ===
A fragmentary chronicle of Ammuna's reign is known. The annals seem to indicate that Ammuna successfully plundered Neša, but was fighting it again soon after. He also seems to have fought against the city of Šattiwara and the city of Šuluki.

His successor was his son Huzziya I, but he also had a daughter, Ištapariya.

== Sources ==
Preceded by Zidanta I	Hittite king ca. 1550–1530 BC	Succeeded by Huzziya I
