= Zidanta I =

Hittite king

- Predecessor: Hantili I
- Successor: Ammuna
- Spouse(s): [...]ša/ta, daughter of Hantili I
- Children: King Ammuna
- Relatives: Huzziya I (grandson)

Zidanta I was a king of the Hittites (Old Kingdom), ruling for 10 years, ca. 1560–1550 BC (middle chronology) or 1496–1486 BC (short chronology timeline). According to the Telepinu Proclamation, this king became a ruler by murder.

== Family ==
Zidanta was married to the daughter of Hantili, brother-in-law to King Mursili I.

It is known that his wife’s name ends with either -ša or -ta.

== Prior to Kingship ==
=== The Royal Coup ===
Zidanta encouraged and helped Hantili to kill Mursili and seize the throne. He then served Hantili I for the duration of his reign.

=== Usurpation of the Throne ===
At the end of Hantili’s life, Zidanta killed Pišeni, the legitimate heir, together with Pišeni’s children and foremost servants, and so made it possible for himself to become king.

== Reign ==
His reign is thought to have lasted about 10 years around 1560-1550 BC (middle chronology).

=== Assassination ===
Zidanta was killed by his own son, Ammuna, who then succeeded him.

== Notes ==
Preceded by Hantili I	Hittite king ca. 1560–1550 BC	Succeeded by Ammuna
