= Kayseri Castle =

Coordinates: 38.7211°N 35.4892°E

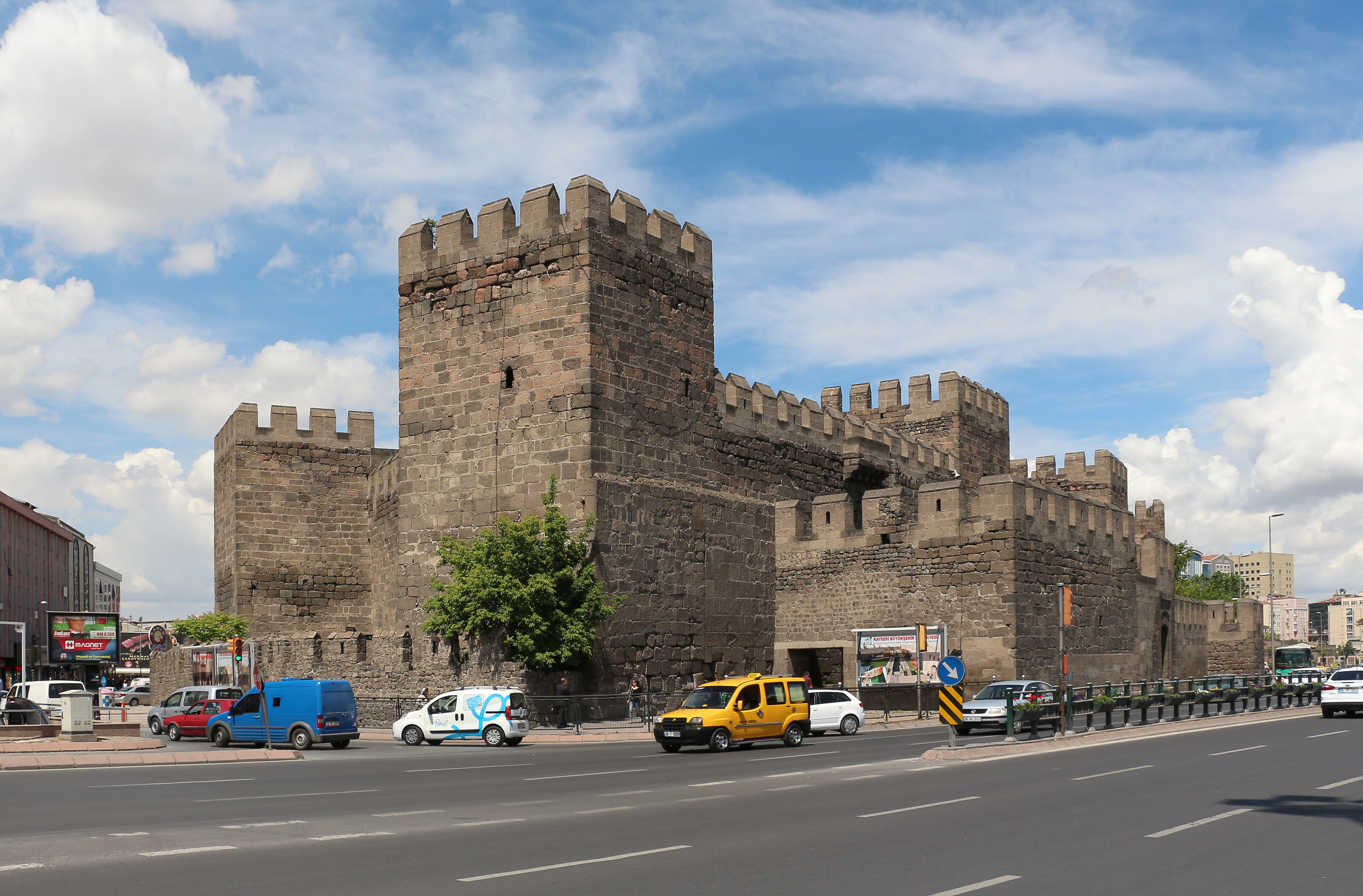
- A side of Kayseri Fortress
- Interactive map of the Kayseri Castle area

General information
- Status: Touristy
- Type: Castle
- Location: Kayseri, Turkey
- Opened: 3rd century

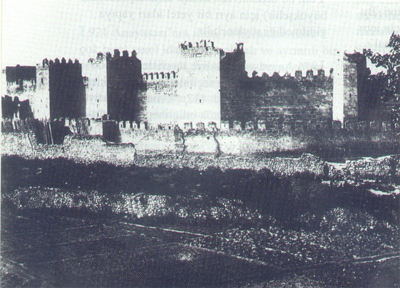
A photograph of the castle from 1897

Kayseri Castle is a castle built in antiquity and first mentioned in a coin during the rule of Gordian III between 238 and 244 AD. It went through multiple additions starting with the Romans, continuing with the Byzantines, Danishmends, Seljuqs, Dulqadirs, Karamanids, and Ottomans. The castle, located in the eponymous city, is made of an inner and an outer section with a total of 18 towers.
