= Tawananna =

Title for the queen of the Hittites

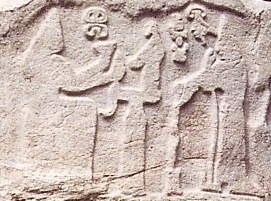
Hittite relief from Firaktin, copy in the Museum of Kayseri: Puduhepa (right) and Ḫepat (left).

Tawananna is the title for the queen of the Hittites, the king's consort, as long as she was living. Upon her death the title Tawananna passed to her daughter or the new king's consort, whichever was available to ascend. The Hittites were ruled by a theocratic monarchy, in which the king's heir's wife did not succeed as Tawananna until the death of the reigning Tawananna.

The Tawananna also had the duty of ruling when the King was away fighting in battle and was the High Priestess while the king was High Priest of the Hittite Empire. The main duties of Tawanannas were mainly religious. An example of a Hittite Tawananna was Puduhepa, wife of Hattusili III. After the death of Hattusili III, Puduhepa took on the responsibility of communicating with the Egyptian royal family and rulers of the Hittite vassal states.

Because the title was reserved, it meant no Tawananna began the Ceremony of Enthronement to her king, until just after the previous Tawananna died. This often resulted in bitter rivalries between newly appointed queens and their stepchildren who would inherit the true power of the kingdom. Such an incident is noted in the translated version of a bilingual Akkadian-Hittite cuneiform tablet, the Testament of Hattusili.

Tawananna is also a personal name of one queen.

== In fiction ==
- The Tawananna title becomes extremely important in the historical manga Red River by Chie Shinohara. The current Tawananna is the very manipulative and embittered Queen Nakia, who wants her son Juda to become the King at any costs; she summons the main protagonist, Yuri Suzuki, via magic to use her as a human sacrifice. However, Yuri turns out to be a very resourceful and caring young woman as well as a serious candidate to ascend to the Tawananna position after becoming the concubine and partner of Nakia's stepson and current heir, Kail Mursili; the rivalry between the ruthless Nakia and the kind-hearted Yuri becomes increasingly personal, and ultimately is one of the main drives of the plot as a whole. By the end Nakia is defeated and banished away, with Yuri taking the Tawananna title and reigning alongside Kail.
- Janet Morris wrote a detailed biographical novel, I, the Sun, whose subject was Suppiluliuma I. The Tawanannas Asmu-nikal, Daduhepa, Khinti and Malnigal are important figures in this novel, in which all characters are from the historical record, which Dr. Jerry Pournelle called "a masterpiece of historical fiction" and about which O.M. Gurney, Hittite scholar and author of The Hittites, commented that "the author is familiar with every aspect of Hittite culture". Morris' book was republished by The Perseid Press in April 2013.
