= Ḫattušili I =

16th-century BC king of the Hittite Old Kingdom

Hattusili I

King of Hittite
- Reign: c. 1650 – c. 1620 BC
- Successor: Mursili I
- Died: c. 1620 BC
- Spouse: Kaddusi

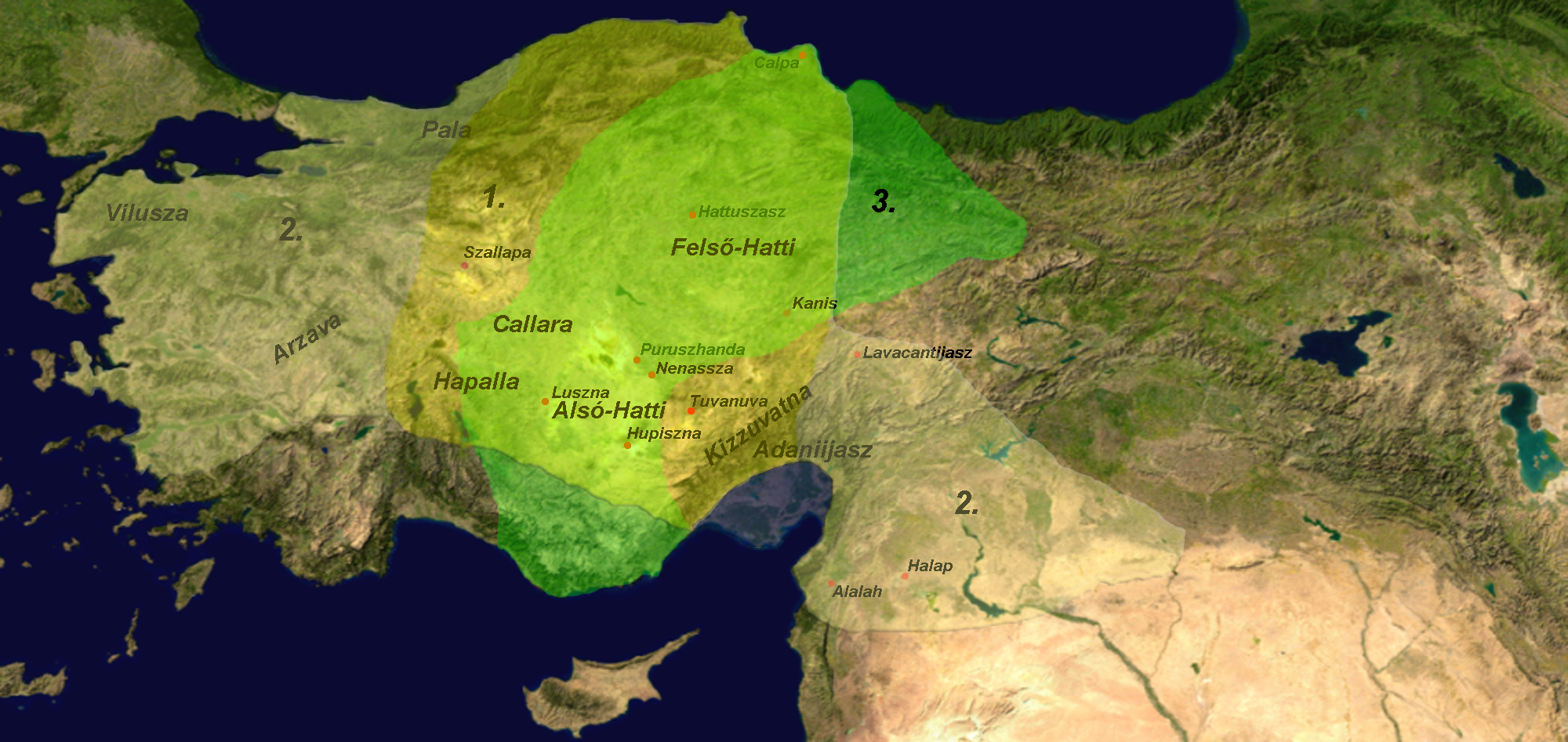
Map of the Hittite Old Kingdom

Hattusili I (Ḫattušili I; died c. 1620 BC) was a king of the Hittite Old Kingdom. He reigned c. 1650–1620 BC (middle chronology), or c. 1640–1610 BC (low middle chronology).

== Family ==
Ḫattušili I was possibly a nephew of his predecessor Labarna I's wife, Tawananna (the title was apparently used as a given name). Tawananna was a daughter of PU-Sarruma (Hišmi-Sarruma), and one brother is known, Papahdilmah, who fought with Labarna for the throne and lost. Papahdilmah could possibly be the father of Ḫattušili I, but another brother of Tawananna could have been as well, due to lack of evidence. Ḫattušili I's wife was named Kadduši and his grandson was Mursili I, who succeeded him, having been chosen as heir instead of Ḫattušili I's nephew.

== Reign ==
Excavations in Zincirli Höyük, Southern Turkey, suggest that a complex there was destroyed in the mid to late 17th century BC, possibly by Hattusili I in a military campaign, which could confirm the middle chronology dating for his reign. This destruction was recently radiocarbon-dated to sometime between 1632 and 1610 BC. This event could have been part of Ḫattušili' Is campaign against Zalpa in order to disrupt an exchange network connected to Aleppo that previously linked the Euphrates River, North Syria, and Central Anatolia. Aslihan K. Yener dates destruction of Level VII Palace at nearby Alalakh, located around 100 km southeast of Tilmen Hoyuk, in the second year of Hattusili's reign, 1628 BC.

He used the title of Labarna at the beginning of his reign. It is uncertain whether he is the second king so identified, making him Labarna II, or whether he is identical to Labarna I, who is treated as his predecessor in Hittite chronologies.

During his reign, he moved the capital from Neša (Kaneš, near modern Kültepe) to Hattusa (near modern Boğazkale), taking the throne name of Ḫattušili to mark the occasion.

He is the earliest Hittite ruler for whom contemporary records have been found. In addition to "King of Ḫattuša", he took the title "Man of Kuššara", a reference to the prehistoric capital and home of the Hittites, before they had occupied Neša.

== Annals of Ḫattušili I ==
A cuneiform tablet found in 1957 written in both the Hittite and Akkadian, known as Annals of Hattusili I, provides details of five years of his reign, and is considered by Trevor Bryce as a copy, after the lifetime of this king, written in 13th century BC. In it, he claims to have extended the Hittite domain to the sea. In the first year of campaign he reached the cities of Sanahuitta and Zalpa, he failed to conquer the former but sacked the later. And in the second year, he claimed to have subdued Alalakh and other cities in Syria, located west of Euphrates River and north of Carchemish, which were allied to Yamhad kingdom. In the third year, he campaigned against Arzawa in western Anatolia, as the Annals only say he: "went to the land of Arzawa and took away its cattle and sheep." In the fourth year, he finally captured Sanahuitta after five months of siege. In the fifth year, the last of his campaigns, the Annals recorded a long list of conquered cities and lands when he crossed the Euphrates River, claiming that no one did it before but king Sargon of Akkad, who crossed the river in the opposite direction.

== Last days ==
The end of his reign is of historical importance because of his Succession Proclamation. This document, written in first person, tells of Ḫattušili I coming back wounded from his last military campaign. On his deathbed he is enraged by the attitude of his heir and how he is conspiring with his mother and cousins. Ḫattušili I then explains that for these reasons Mursili I, his grandson, will be the next king instead, and urges the army and public servants to obey him.

The arguments are in a tablet, classified as CTH 6, also known as the "Testament of Hattusili I," in which he rejects his nephew as his successor, and designates his grandson Muršili I to occupy the throne. This Testament as well as the Annals survived only as a late 13th century BC copy.

This apparently worked since Mursili I indeed became king and continued Ḫattušili I's military campaigns, finally conquering Aleppo and sacking Babylon.

== Reintroduction of writing to Anatolia ==
During the karum period, Assyrian merchants living in Anatolia used cuneiform to create documents in Akkadian. During that period, some local Anatolians, such as Hittite King Anitta, also utilized cuneiform to create inscriptions. However, cuneiform fell out of use in Anatolia at the end of the karum period when Assyrian influence waned. Ḫattušili I may have been responsible for reintroducing cuneiform to Anatolia upon returning from his campaigns in Syria. This proposition is supported by the fact that the cuneiform used during Ḫattušili's reign was stylistically derived from the cuneiform used in Syria at that time, which was ultimately based on the Babylonian dialect of Akkadian, rather than the Assyrian-style cuneiform used in Anatolia during the karum period. Ḫattušili may have taken Syrian scribes back to Anatolia with him.

== See also ==
- History of the Hittites

Preceded by	King of Hittite c. 1650 – c. 1620 BC	Succeeded by Mursili I
