= Kayseri Archaeology Museum =

Museum in Kayseri, Turkey

- Kayseri Arkeoloji Müzesi
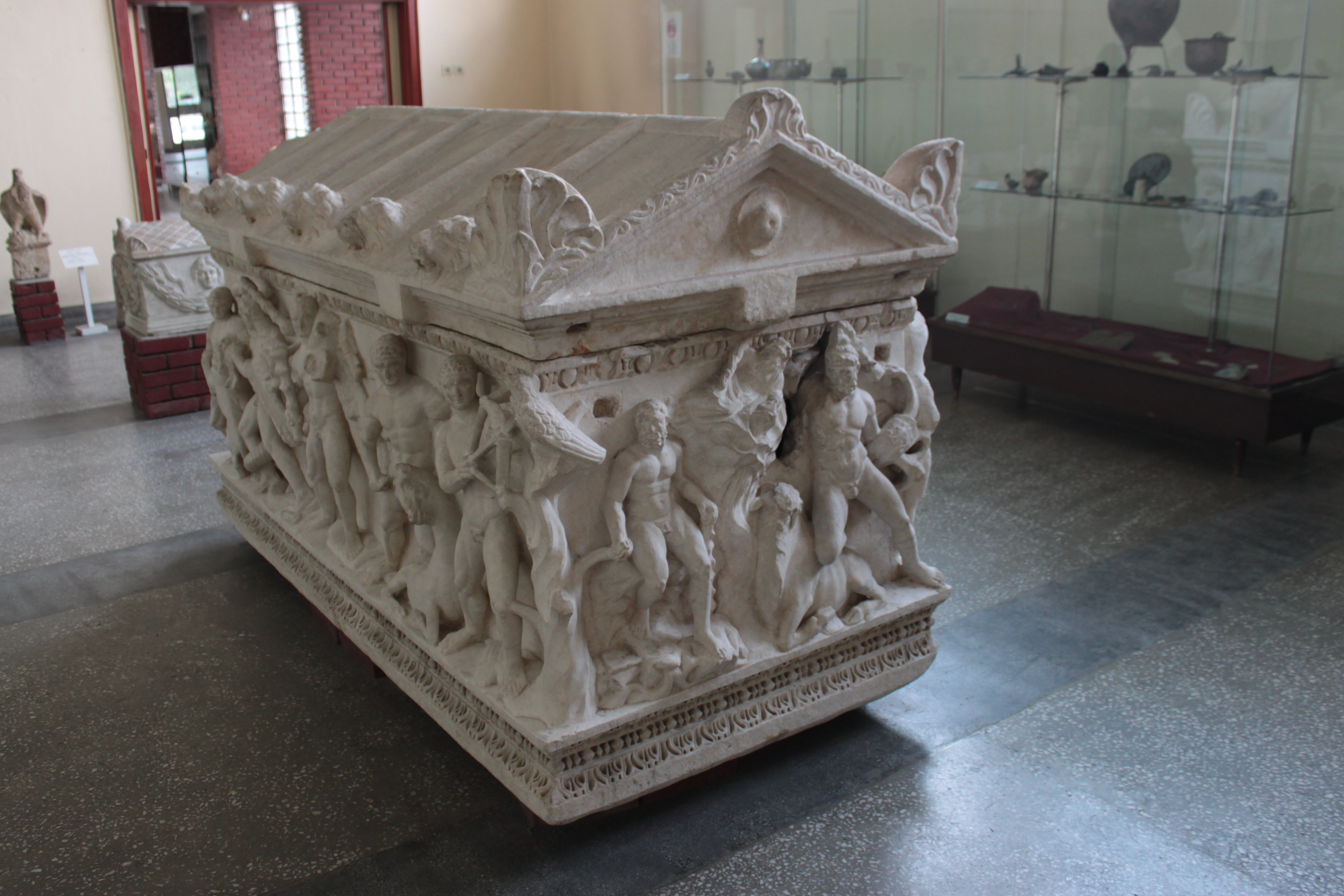
- Heracles sarcophagus

- Kayseri Archaeology Museum
- Established: 1969; 57 years ago
- Location: Cumhuriyet Mahallesi, Kaleiçi Meydan Kümeevler, No: 1 kayseri, Turkey
- Coordinates: 38°43′17″N 35°29′19″E
- Type: Archaeology
- Owner: Ministry of Culture

Kayseri Archaeology Museum is a museum in Kayseri, Turkey. Kayseri Archeology Museum, which has been serving here for about 50 years, has been moved to the new museum building within the Kayseri Castle and has been opened to visitors since 19 October 2019. In the new museum, there are 14 exhibition halls in chronological order. The works in the exhibition halls date from the Chalcolithic Age to the Late Osmanlı period. The address now is Cumhuriyet Mahallesi, Kaleiçi Meydan Kümeevler, No: 1, Melikgazi/Kayseri.

Kayseri is an old city. The Kültepe ruins are about 22 kilometres (14 mi) south west of the city. The old museum was opened on 26 June 1969, the new one in 2019.

== Exhibited items ==
=== Previous museum ===
The first hall was reserved for the Kültepe ruins. The origin of the clay tablets are either Assyrian trade post (karum) or the Hittite city Kültepe (Nesa). These are the earliest written materials in Turkey (ca 1900 B.C.), pitchers, vases, stamps, bowls, metallic objects and various reliefs. In the corridor between the two halls the Phrygian ceramics are displayed. The second hall was the hall of the later civilizations such as Hellenistic, Roman and Byzantine eras. These are ornaments, figurines, marble sculptures, etc. One of the most important items was the Heracles sarcophagus which was found during the construction of a nearby building. There were also some items in the yard.

=== New museum ===
There are a total of 13 exhibition halls namely Chalcolithic Period Hall, Early Bronze Period Hall, Tablet Hall, Assyrian Trade Colonies Period Hall, Hittite Period Hall, Late Hittite Period Stone Artefacts Hall, Archaic-Classical Period Halls, Hellenistic Period Hall, Roman Period Hall, Eastern Roman Period Hall, Seljuk Period Hall and Ottoman Period Hall where the artefacts found in Kayseri and its surroundings and brought to our Directorate and the artifacts found in the Kültepe Kaniş/Neşa excavations, which were excavated continuously from 1948 to the present, in Kültepe Karum/Kaniş Ruins, 22 km east of Kayseri are exhibited. There is also a temporary exhibition hall where temporary exhibitions are held.
