= Mursili I =

Hittite king

King of Hittite
- Reign: c. 1620 – c. 1590 BC
- Predecessor: Hattusili I
- Successor: Hantili I
- Died: c. 1590 BC
- Spouse: Kali

Mursili I (also known as Mursilis; sometimes transcribed as Murshili; died c. 1590 BC) was a king of the Hittites c. 1620–1590 BC, as per the middle chronology, the most accepted chronology in our times (or alternatively c. 1556–1526 BC, short chronology), and was likely a grandson of his predecessor, Hattusili I. His sister was Ḫarapšili and his wife was queen Kali.

== Accession ==
Mursili came to the throne as a minor. Having reached adulthood, he renewed Hattusili I's warfare in northern Syria.

== Campaigns ==
Campaigns of Mursili I
Date	c. 1600 BC – c. 1595 BC
Location	Middle East and Anatolia
Result	Hittite victory

Belligerents
Hittite	Yamhad; Babylon; Syrian city-states

Commanders and leaders
Mursili I	Hammurabi III; Samsu-Ditana

=== Conquest of Yamhad (Aleppo) ===
He invaded Yamhad and its capital, Aleppo, which had eluded Hattusili I. He then led an unprecedented march of 2,000 km southeast into the heart of Mesopotamia, where around 1595 BC he sacked the city of Babylon. Mursili I's motivation for attacking Babylon remains unclear, though William Broad has proposed that the reason was obtaining grain because the clouds from the Minoan eruption decreased the Hittites' harvests.

=== Sack of Babylon ===
The raid on Babylon could not have been intended to exercise sovereignty over the region; it was simply too far from Anatolia and the Hittites' center of power. It is thought, however, that the raid on Babylon brought an end to the Amorite dynasty of Hammurabi and allowed the Kassites to take power, and so might have arisen from an alliance with the Kassites or an attempt to curry favor with them. It might also be that Mursili undertook the long-distance attack for personal motives, namely as a way to outdo the military exploits of his predecessor, Hattusili I.

== Assassination ==
When Mursili I returned to his kingdom, he was assassinated in a conspiracy led by his brother-in-law, Hantili I (who took the throne), and Hantili's son-in-law, Zidanta I. His death inaugurated a period of social unrest and decay of central rule, followed by the loss of the conquests made in Syria.

== In popular culture ==
Mursili I is a playable leader (as the Latinized form "Mursilis") of the Hittite state in the 2001 video game Civilization III.

== See also ==
- History of the Hittites

Preceded by Hattusili I	King of Hittite c. 1620 – c. 1590 BC	Succeeded by Hantili I
