= Telepinu Proclamation =

16th-century BC Hittite edict

Telipinu (or Telepinu) Proclamation is a Hittite edict, written during the reign of King Telipinu, c. 1525-1500 BCE. The text is classified as CTH 19 in the Catalogue of Hittite Texts.

The edict is significant because it made possible to reconstruct a succession of Hittite Kings. It also recounts some important events like Mursili I's conquest of Babylon of which no other Hittite document exists. Little more than the names of the successors of Telipinu is known for a period of about 80 years.

Van Seter argues that the edict is a legal, rather than a historical text, laying out rules for royal succession in the Hittite Kingdom. Lawson criticizes this approach by saying that a quasi-legal text may also be a historical one. Mario Liverani observes that the edict should be interpreted carefully, for it is a lot more useful in understanding the situation at the time it was written than in reconstructing the past history.
