= Archaeological Museum of Delos =

Coordinates: 37°24′3″N 25°16′9″E

- Αρχαιολογικό Μουσείο Δήλου
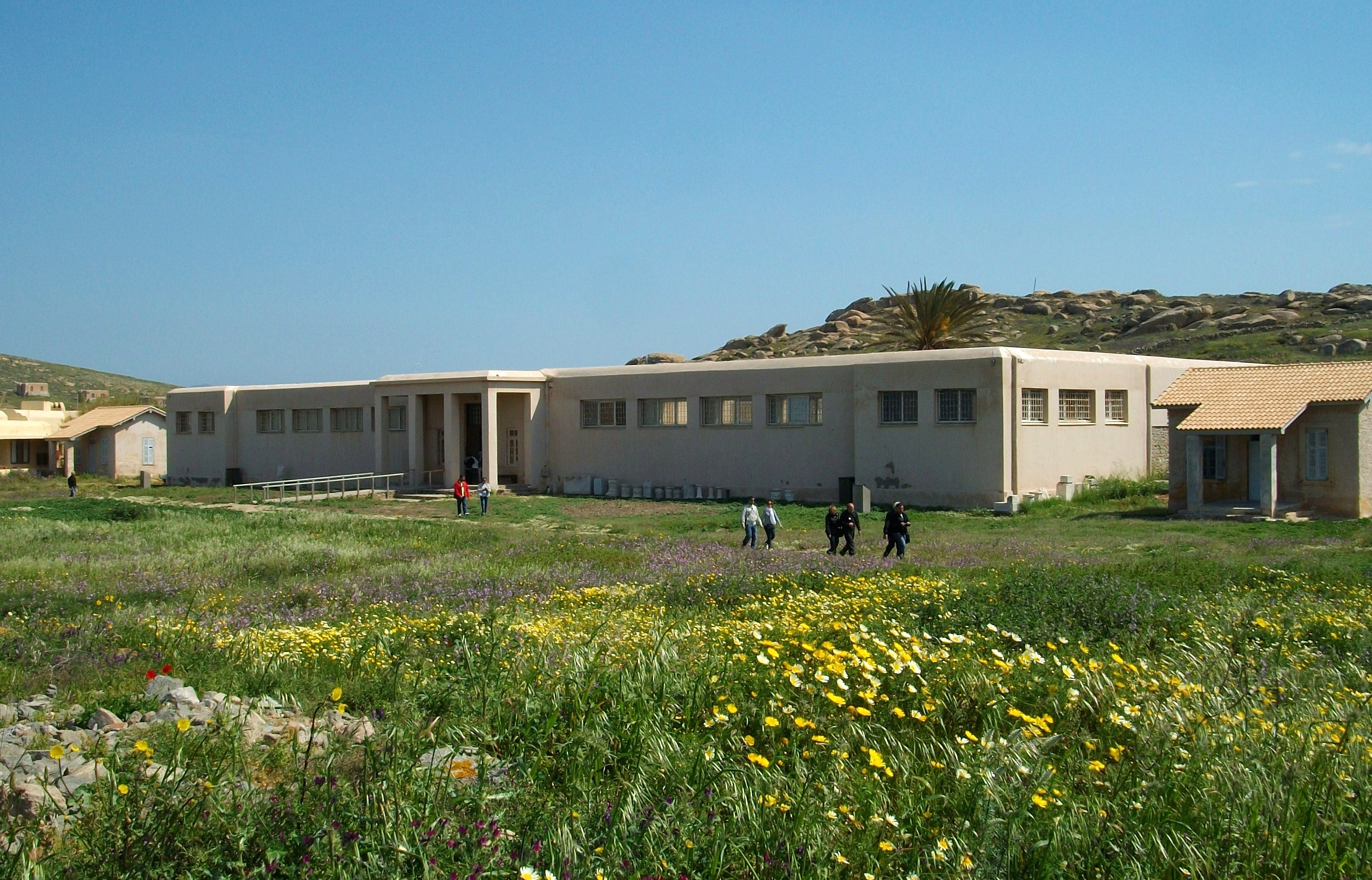
- Exterior view of the museum.
- Established: 1904
- Location: Delos, Cyclades, South Aegean, Greece
- Type: Archaeological museum

The Archaeological Museum of Delos (Greek: Αρχαιολογικό Μουσείο Δήλου) is a museum on the island of Delos, near Mykonos in the South Aegean, Greece. It is noted for its extensive collection of statues unearthed in the surrounding area of the ancient site, which has been declared a UNESCO World Heritage Site. Although the museum has a considerable collection, it does not contain all of the items found in Delos: a large quantity are on display in Athens at the National Archaeological Museum.

== History ==
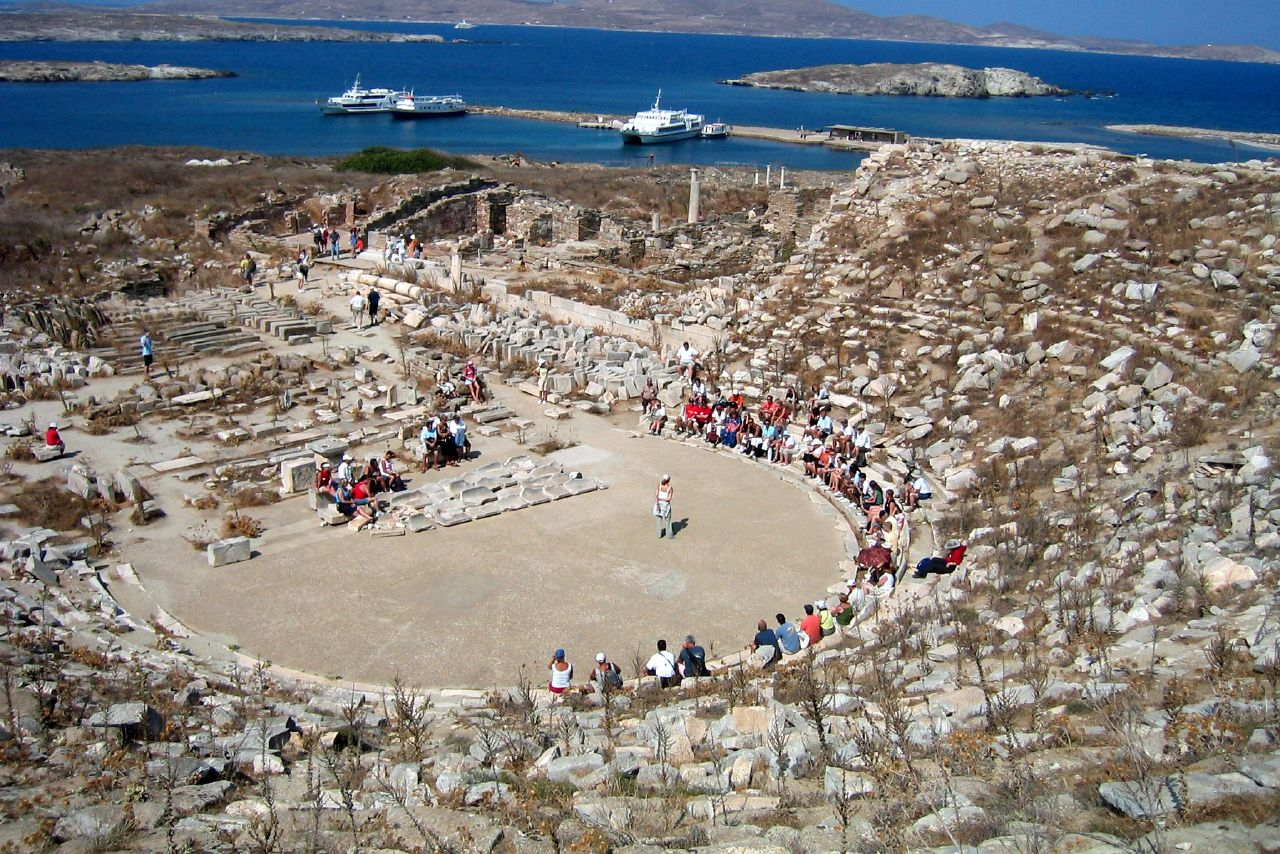
Delos Theatre. The World Heritage site surrounding the museum which supplied the museum with its collection.

In 1872, the French School at Athens began excavating on Delos, in a project on a massive scale, which is still ongoing today.

As the collection accumulated, the museum was built on-site in 1904 by the Archaeological Society of Athens to accommodate the archaeological discoveries. Its original five rooms underwent expansion in 1931 and then again in 1972 to nine rooms.

== Displays ==
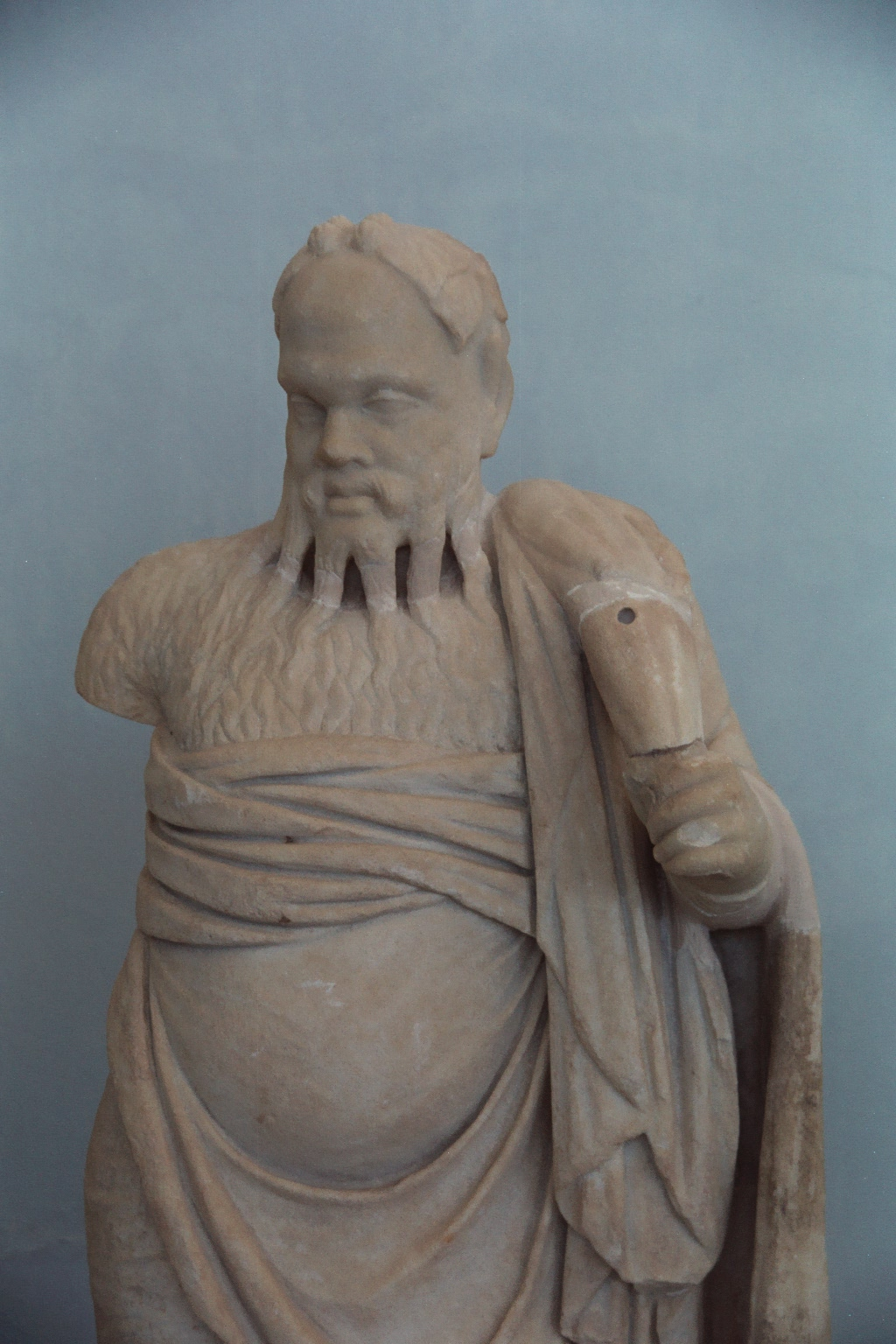
Silenus, the tutor of Dionysos

Its ancient pottery collection dates from the 25th to the 1st century BC, while the clay figurines, jewelry and mosaics conserved in the museum date back to the 2nd-1st centuries BC. Six rooms contain the statues and reliefs found in Delos; two rooms contain the pottery and another room contains items used in everyday life in ancient Greece.

Of major note is an ivory plaque which dates to 1400-1200 BC that depicts a Mycenaean soldier clad with a helmet made from wild boar teeth with defensive shield and spear. It was discovered at Artemision along with other gold, ivory and bronze items. The museum has a 5th-century marble statue of Boreas which portrays the kidnapping of the Athenian princess Oreitheia and marble statues of Dioskourides and his wife Kleopatra, who lived on Delos island. The statues, which were unearthed at their former residence, date from 138 BC.

The Delos Archaeological Museum also contains the torso of a kouros of the 6th century BC, and an inscribed triangular base of another kouros statue found in the Sanctuary of Apollo dated to the 7th century BC. The inscription engraved on one side says: "Euthycartides the Naxian made me and dedicated me".

There is a set of large lion statues which are originals; of those reproduced outside on the Delos site. There is a Corinthian alabastron, which is a small, perfumed oil container with an artistic depiction of Potnia Theron, the lady of the beasts and protectress of hunting, among two swans. It was discovered in the Heraion along with similar Corinthian vases dating to the end of the 7th century BC. The Delos Archaeological Museum also has an archaic statue of a woman, found in the Sanctuary of Apollo dated to 580 BC. There is also a valuable fresco taken from the exterior wall of a house in the Skardana Quarter, depicting Heracles, two boxers and a man playing a flute or trumpet. The inscription which says "Kalamodrya" is believed to refer to the prominent boxer of the 1st century BC.

== Gallery ==
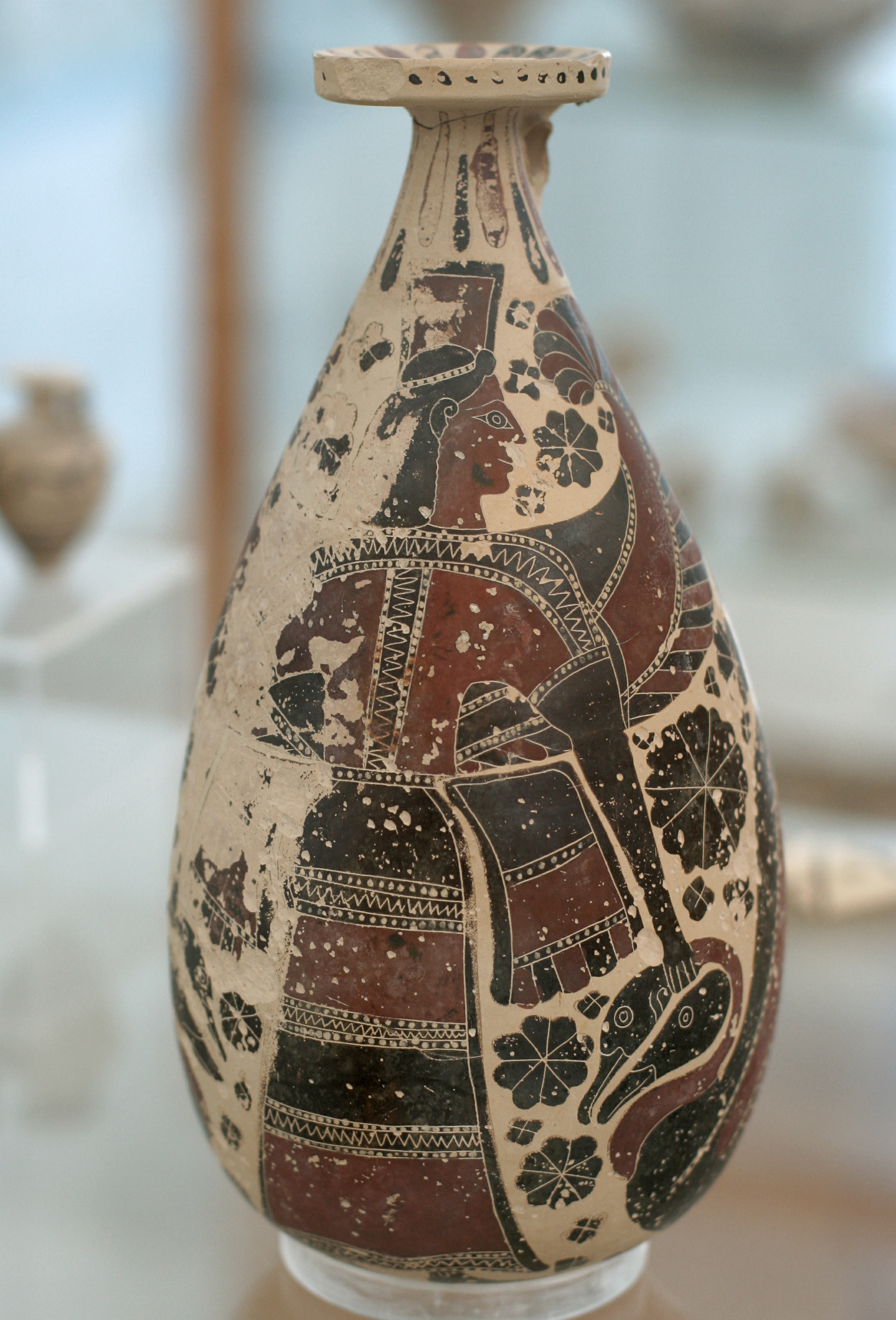
Alabastron, Artemis with swans, find from Heraion. Corinthian production, 620-600 BC.

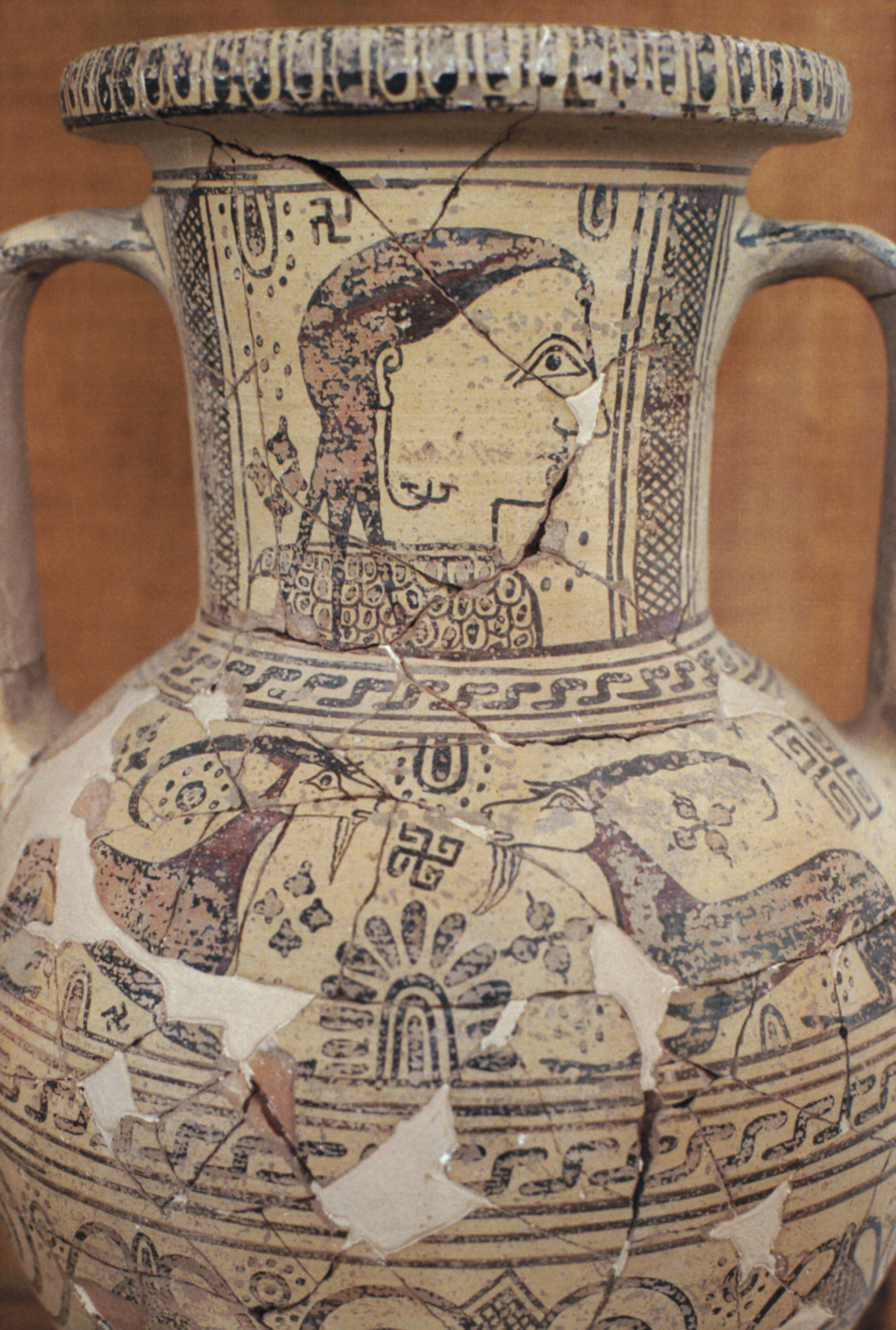
Melian amphora from the sanctuary of Zeus at the top Kynthos, 620-600 BC

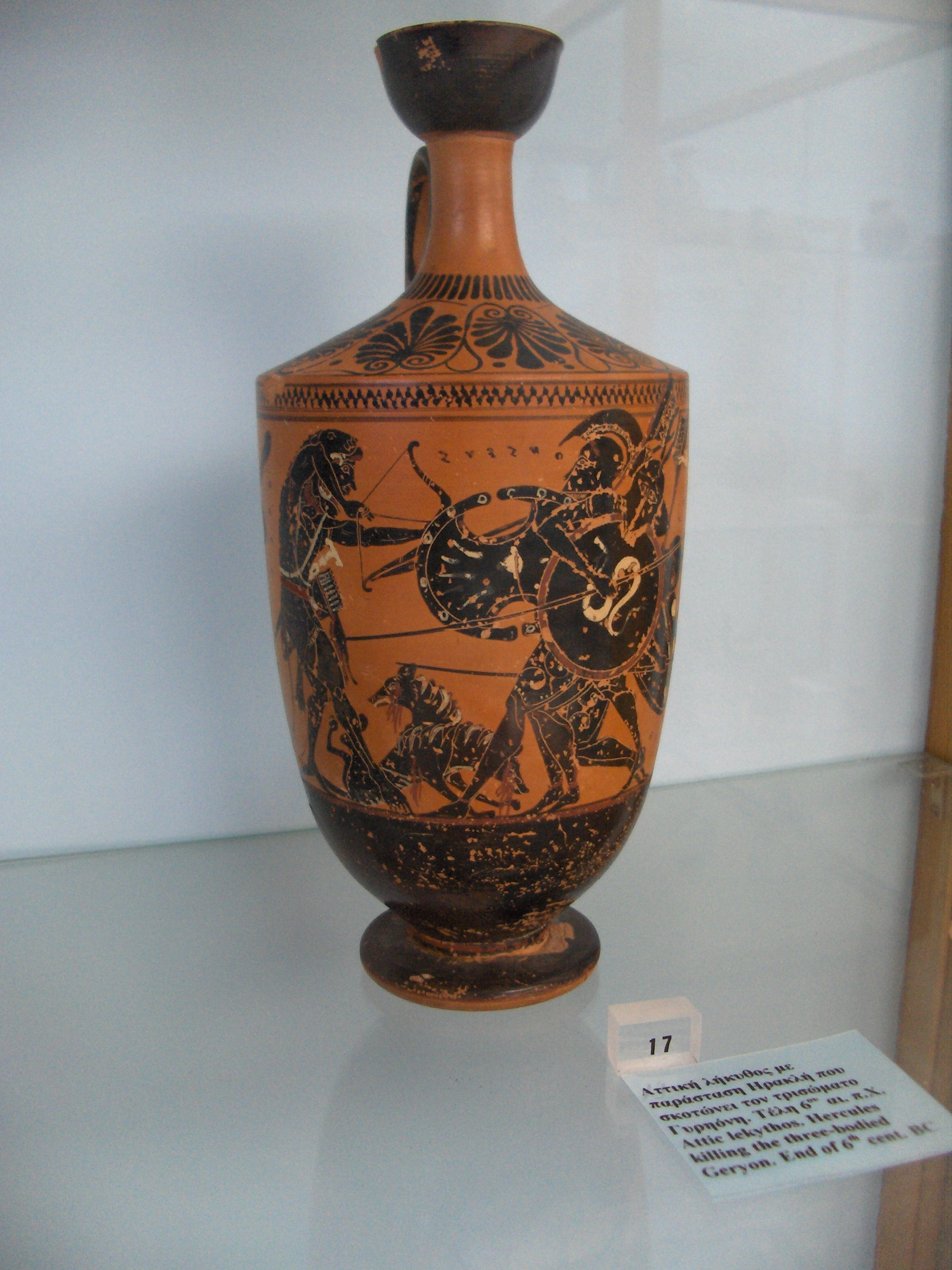
Herakles fighting the three-bodied Geryon. Attic lekythos, end of 6th century BC

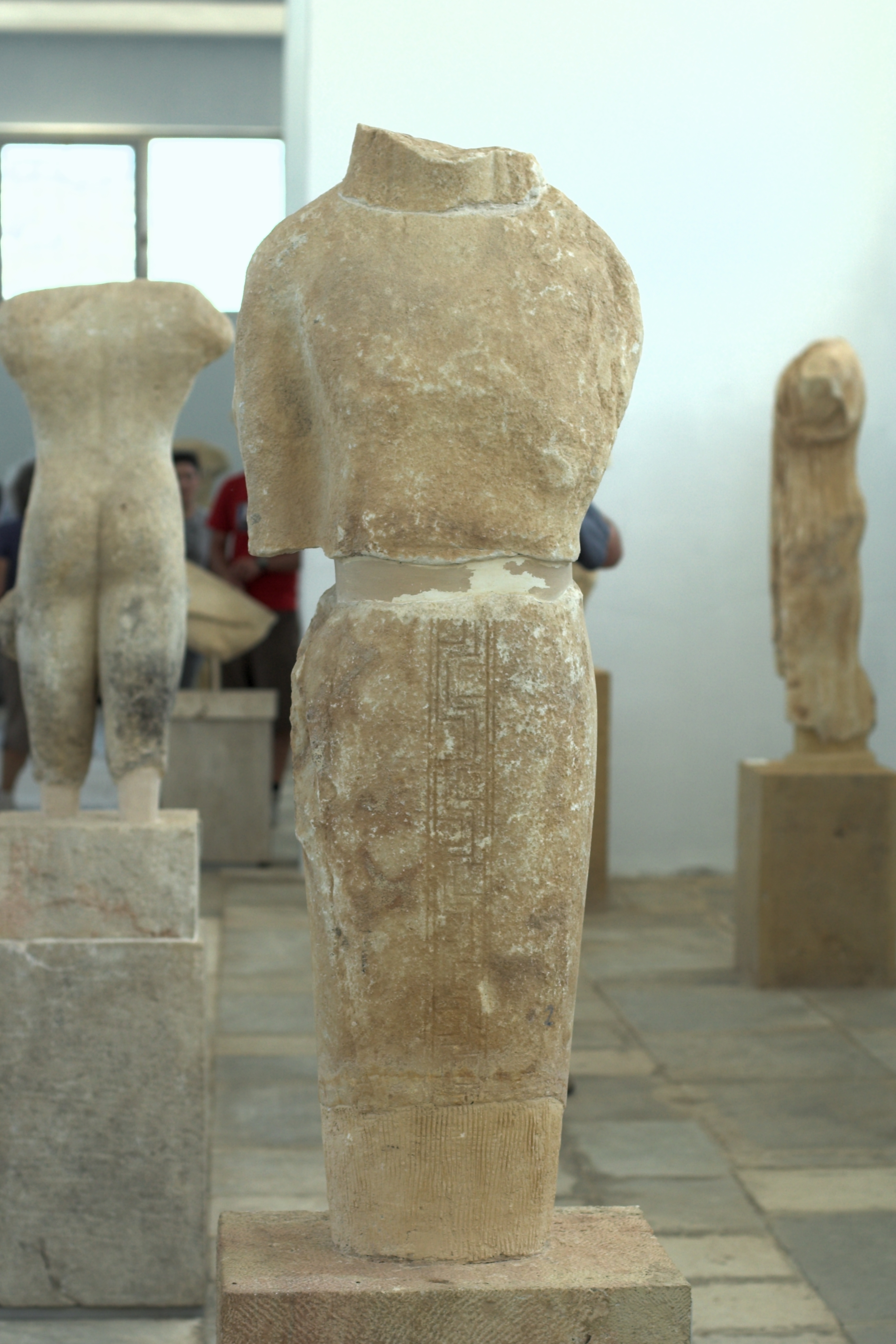
Kore with peplos, Parian work, 580 BC. Found in the Temple of Apollo at Delos.

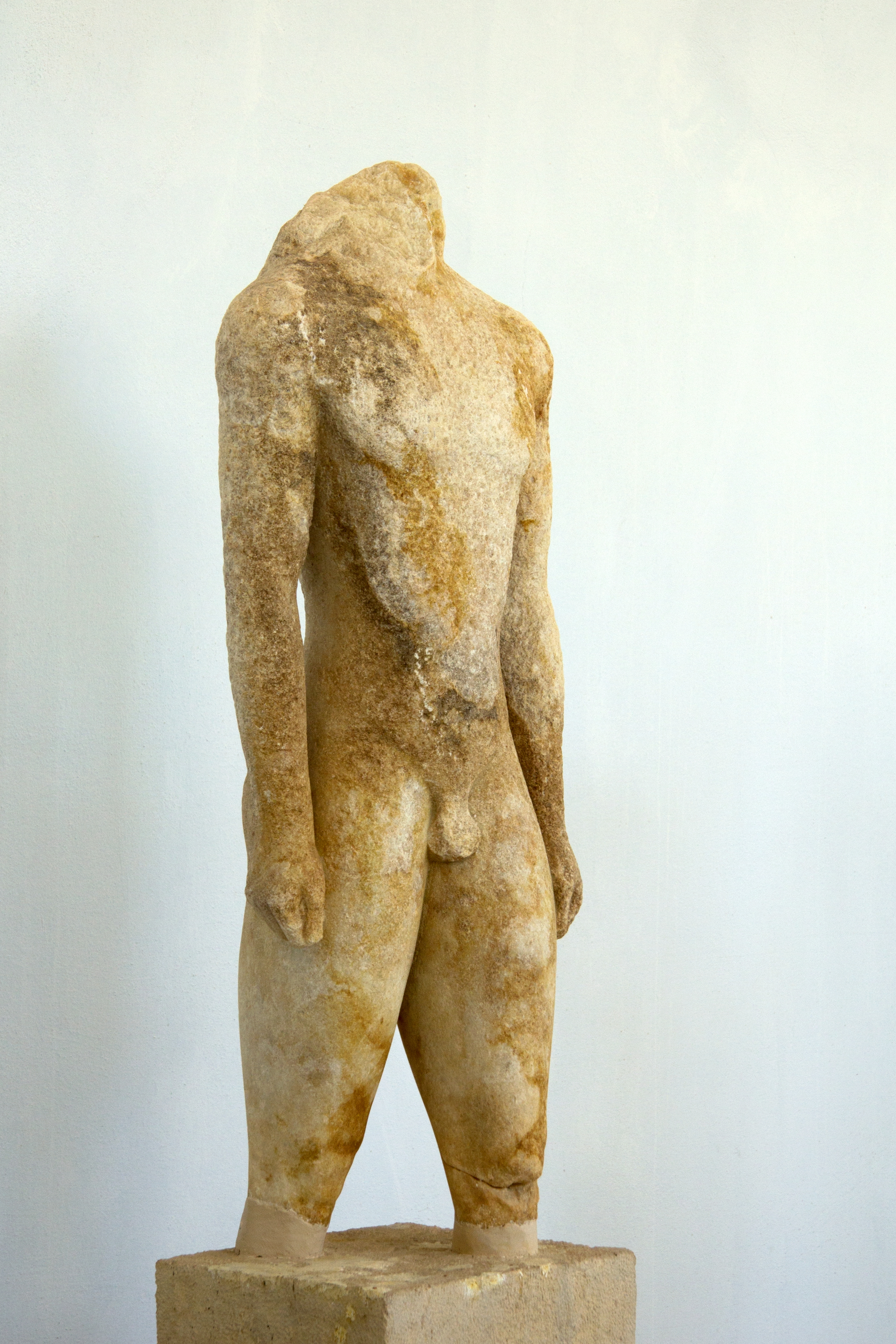
Kouros, Naxian work, marble, circa 550 BC. Found on Delos.

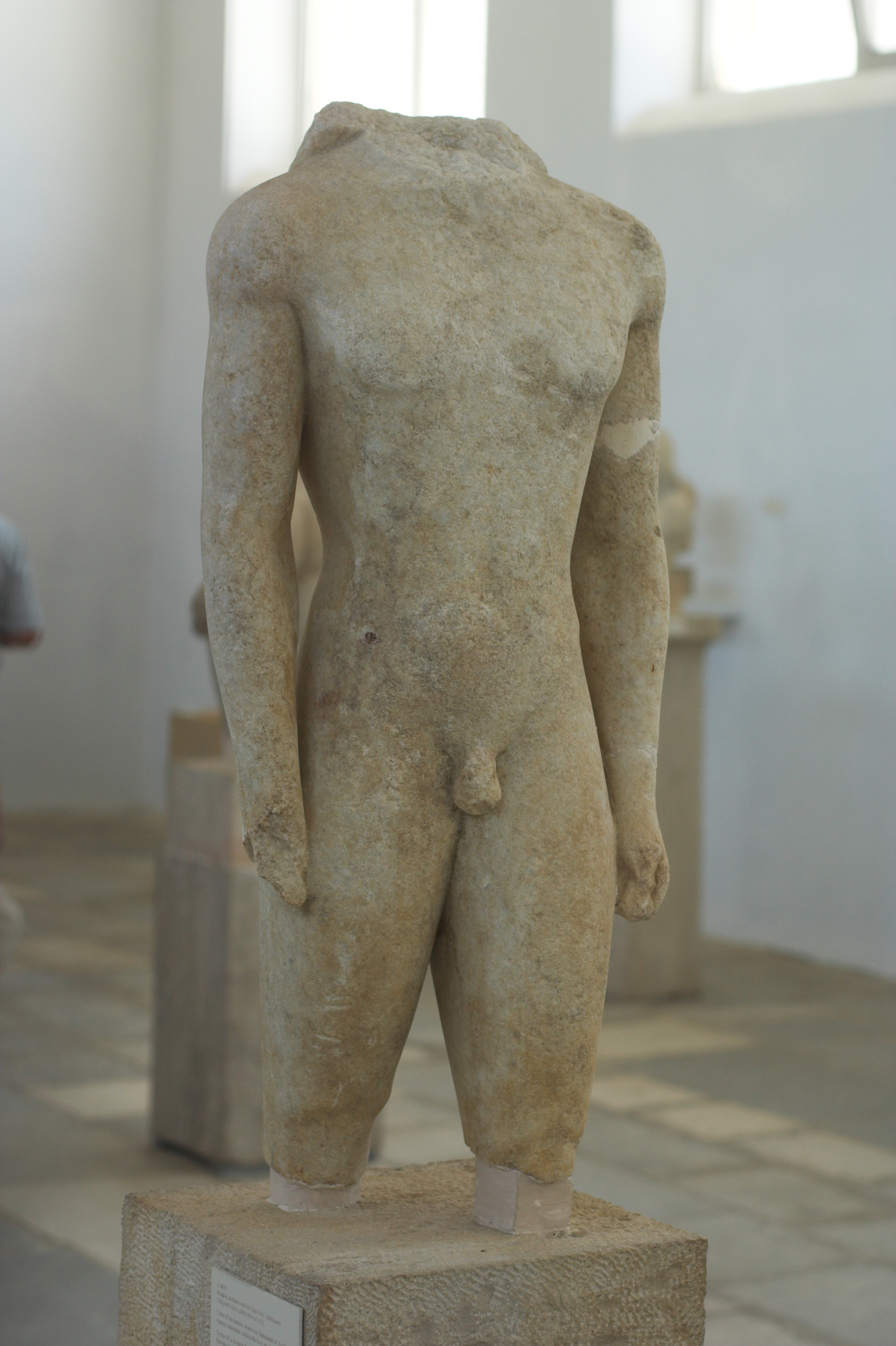
Kouros, Naxian work, torso, circa 550 BC. Found on Delos.

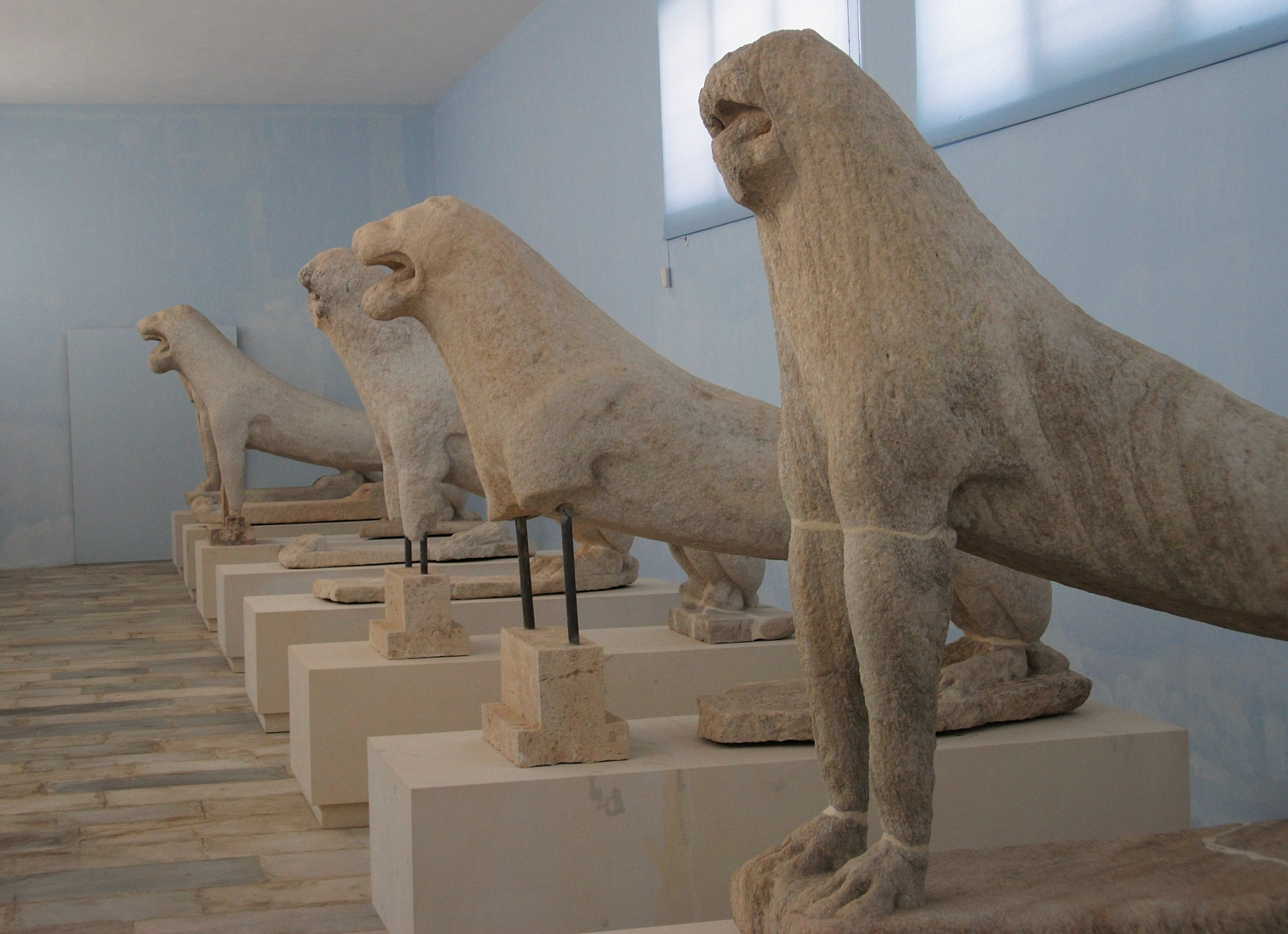
Lion statues. Naxian work, 620-600 BC. Finds from the Lion terrace on Delos.

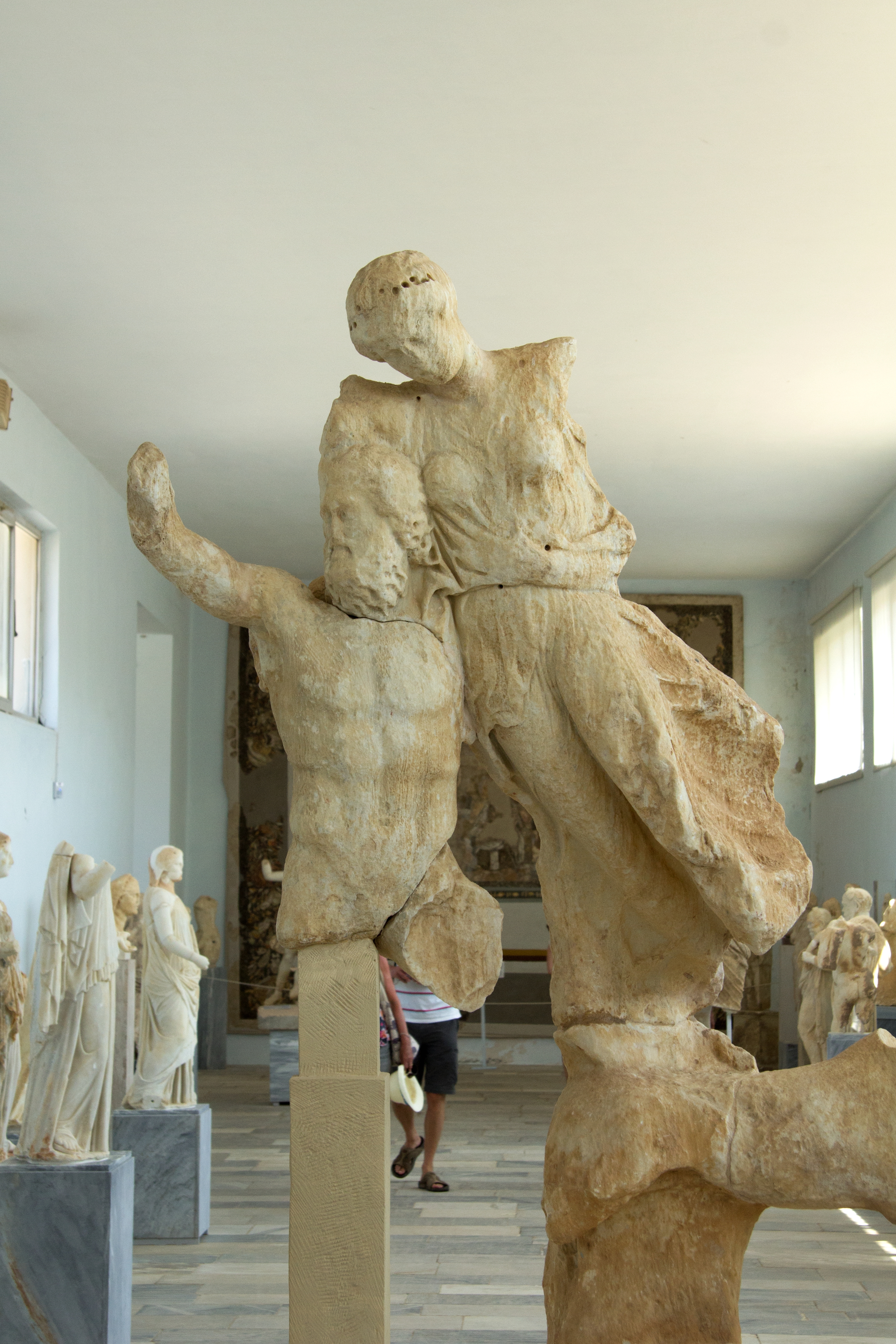
Boreas kidnaps Oreithya. Central akroterion of the Athenians Temple of Apollo on Delos. Athenians work, 421-417 BC.

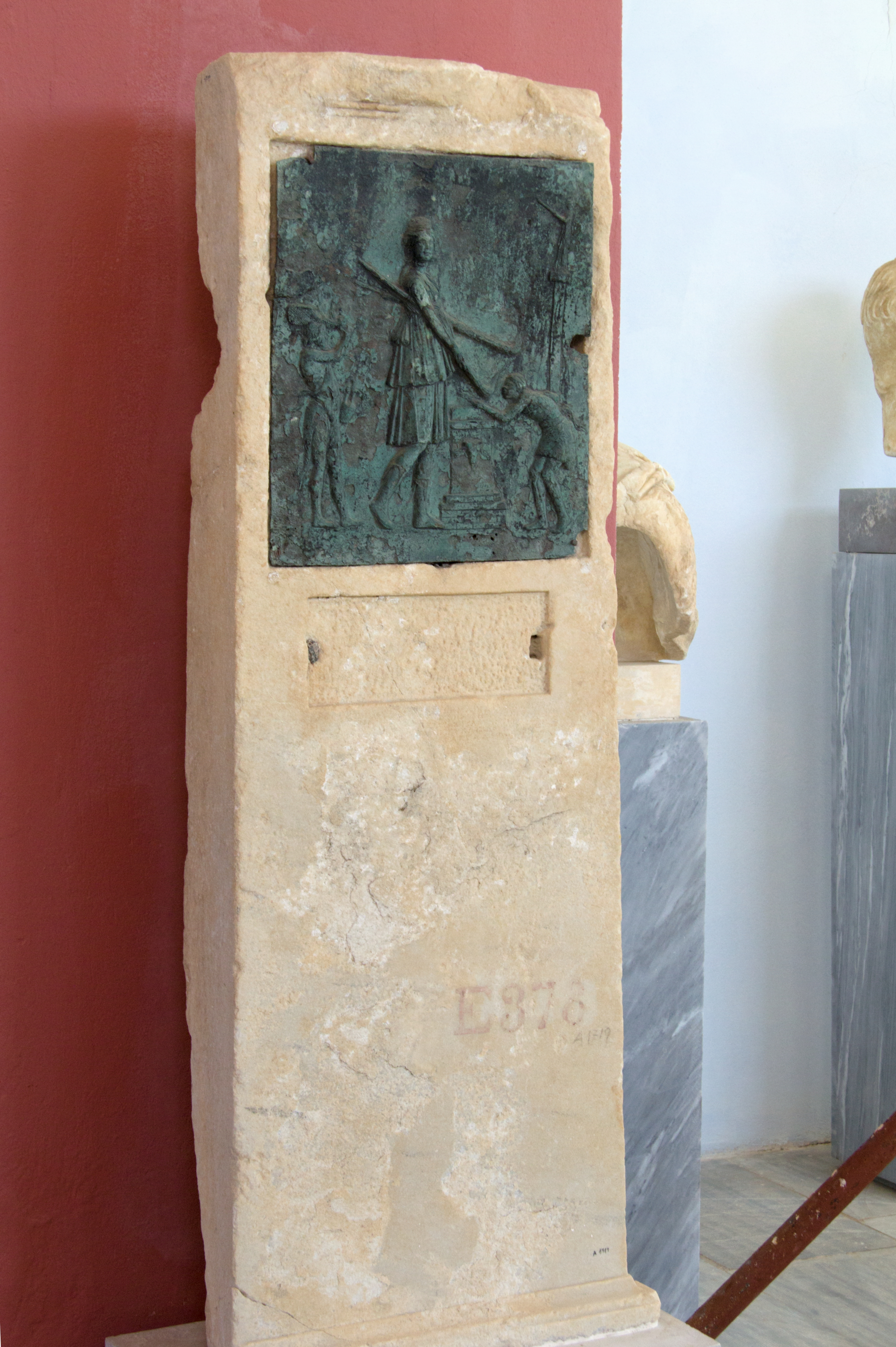
Bronze relief at votive stele Artemis with two satyrs preparing sacrofice, 225-200 BC.

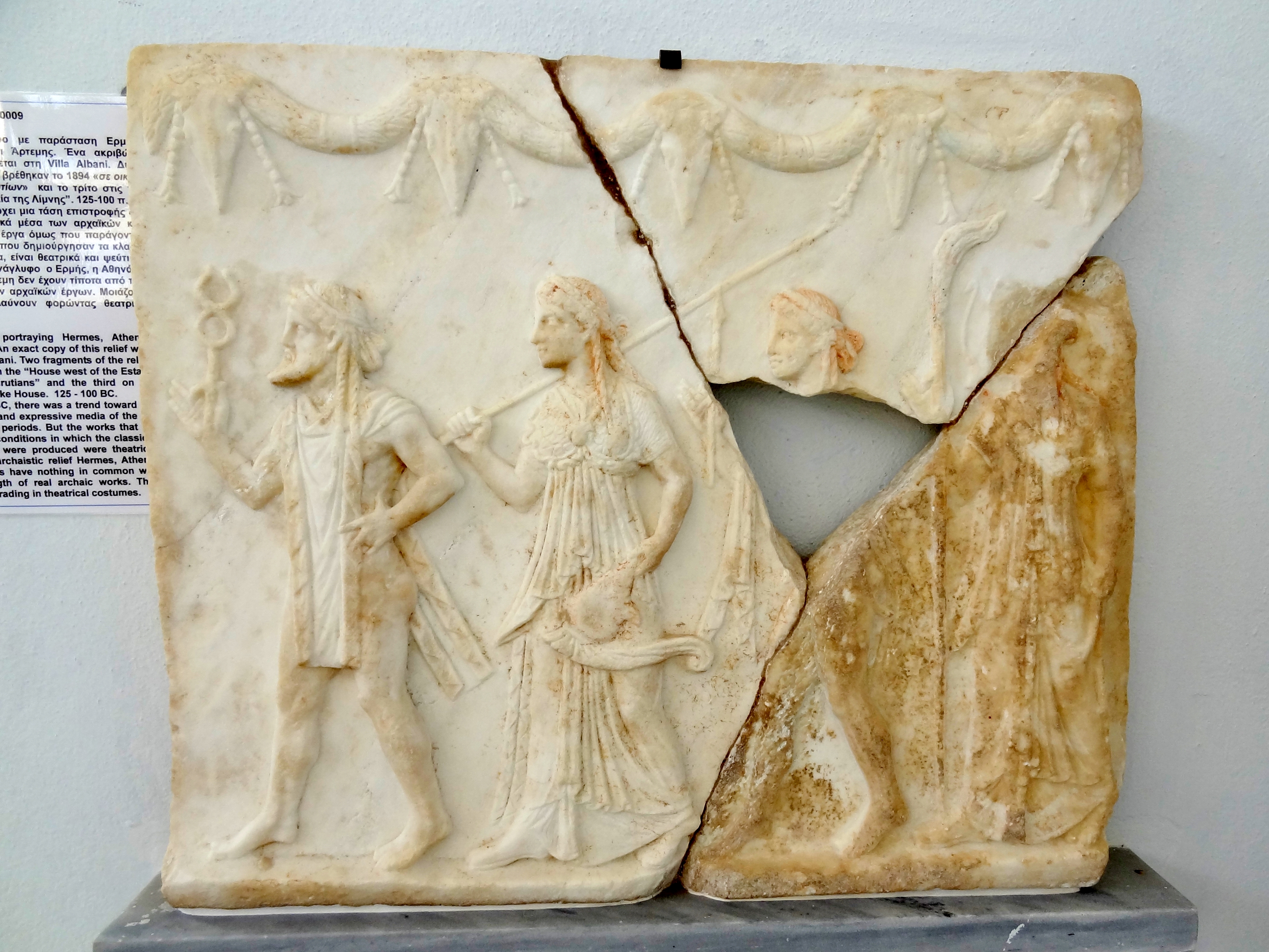
Hermes, Athena, Apollo. Relief from the House near lake on Delos, 2nd century BC, archaizinf style.

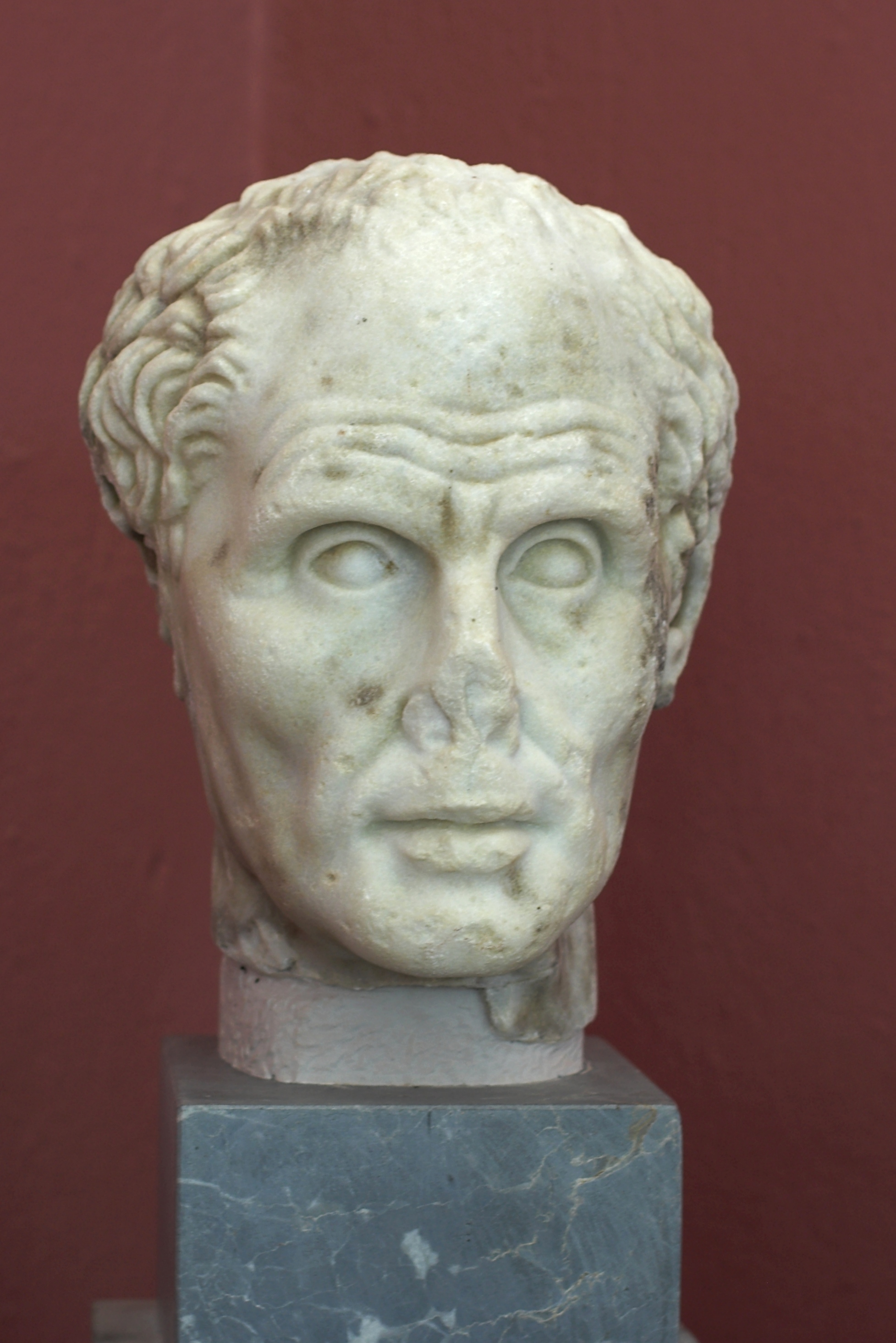
Head of the old man, from the Palaistra near the lake, end of 2. century BC.

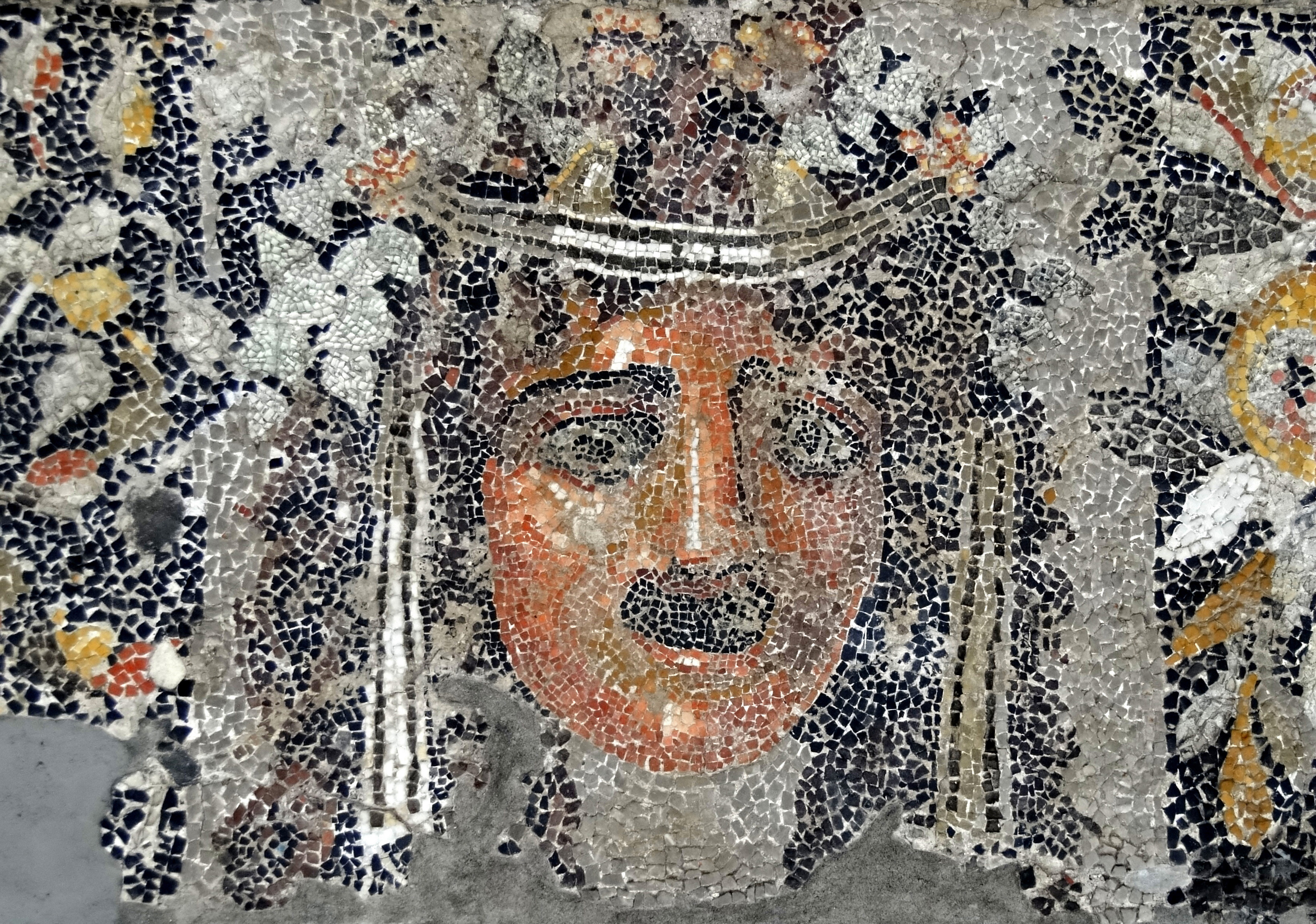
Mosaic from the Insula of the Jewellery

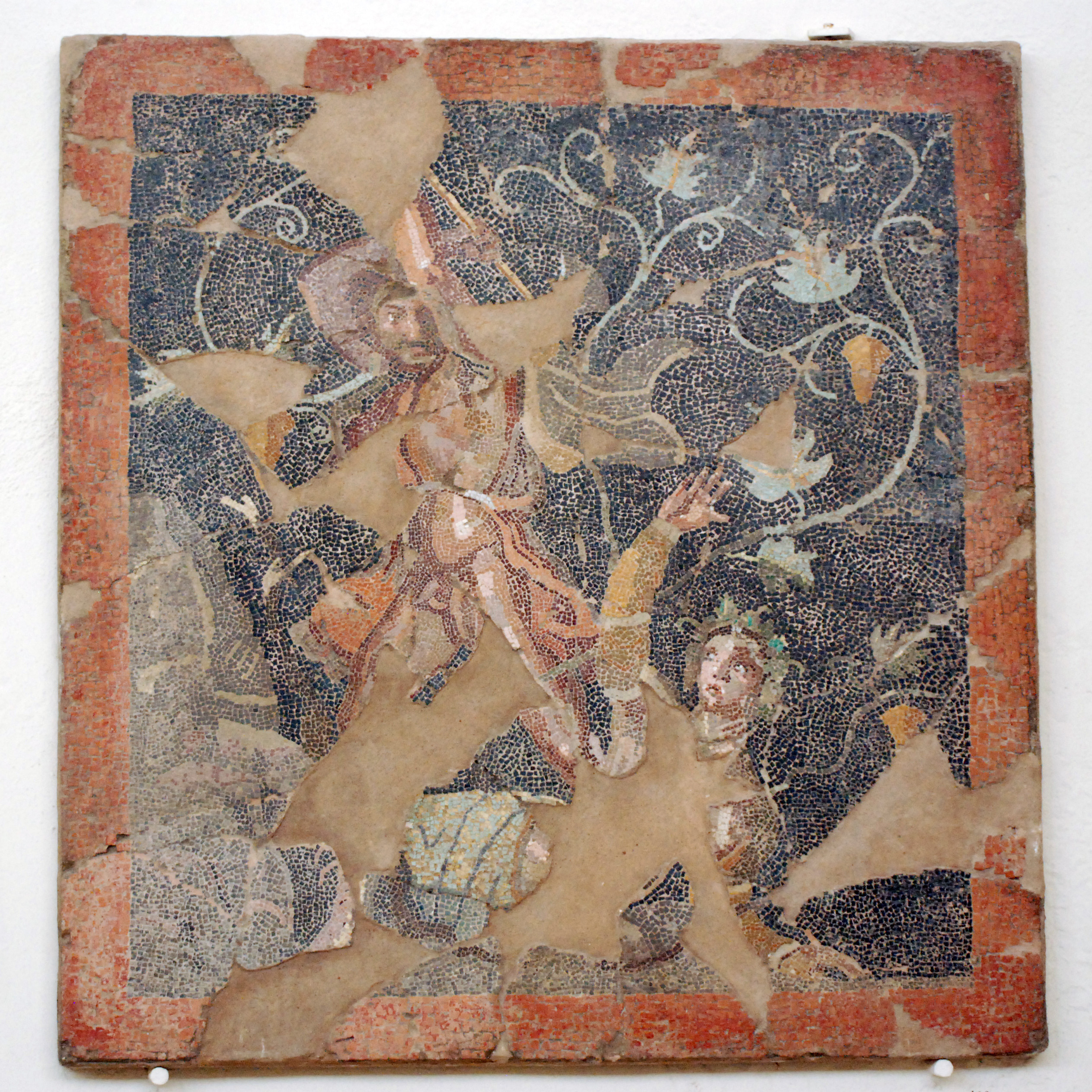
Mosaic depicting King Lycurgus of Thrace killing Ambrosia (2nd BC)

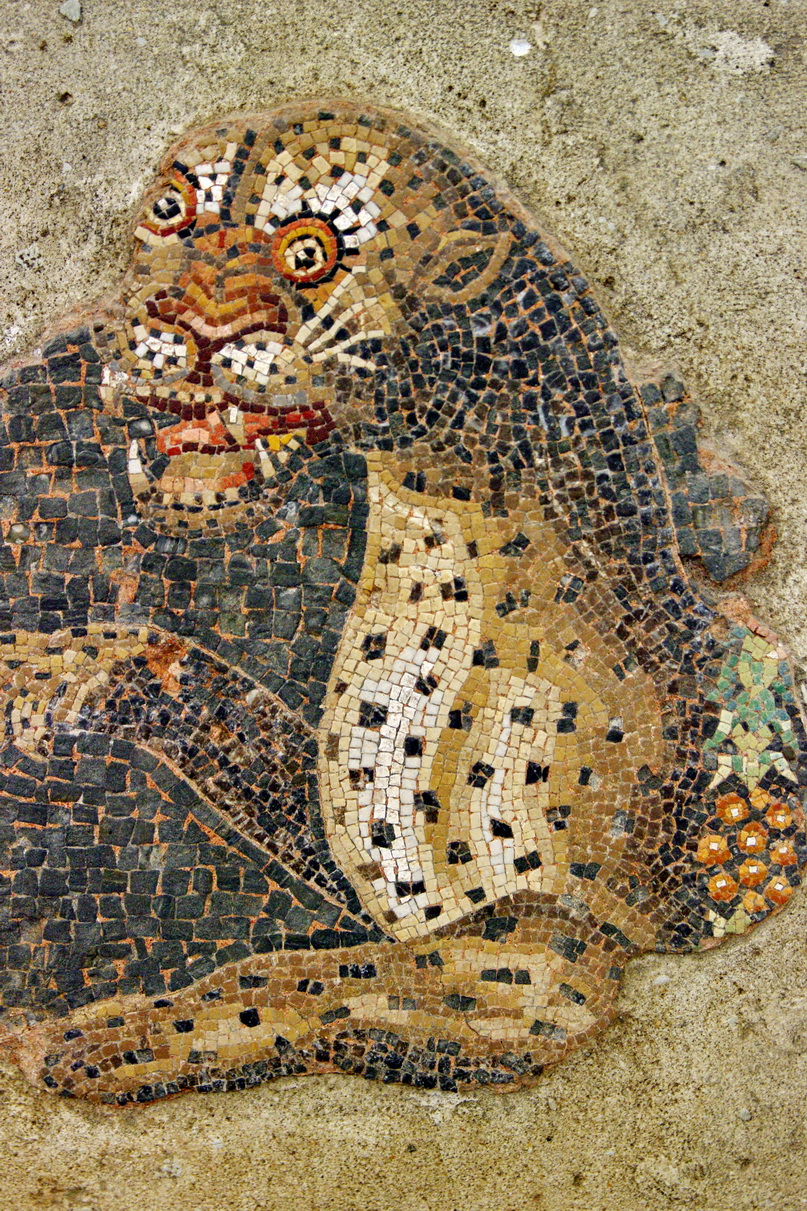
Mosaic from the House of the Masks

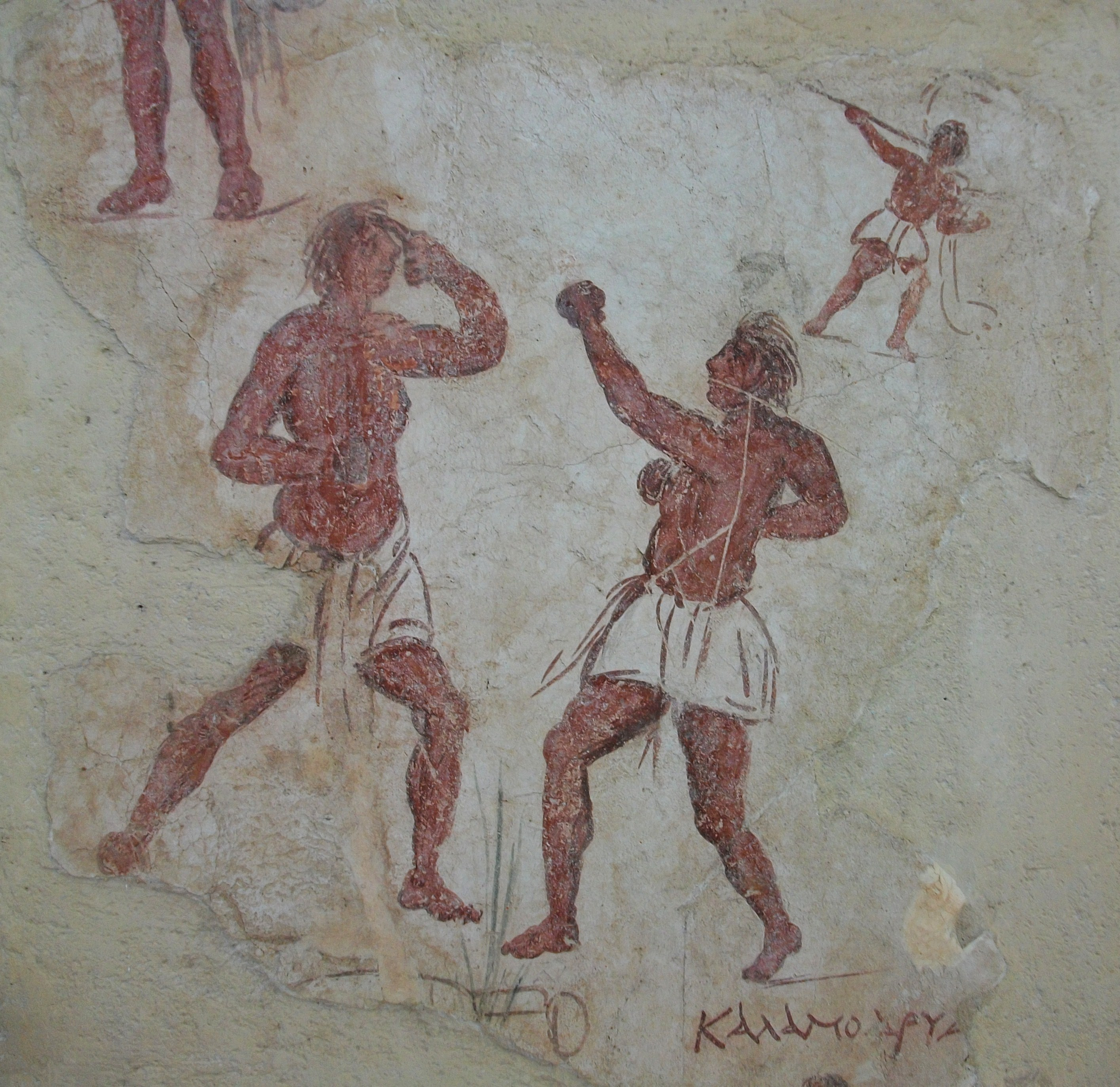
Fresco depicting ancient boxers

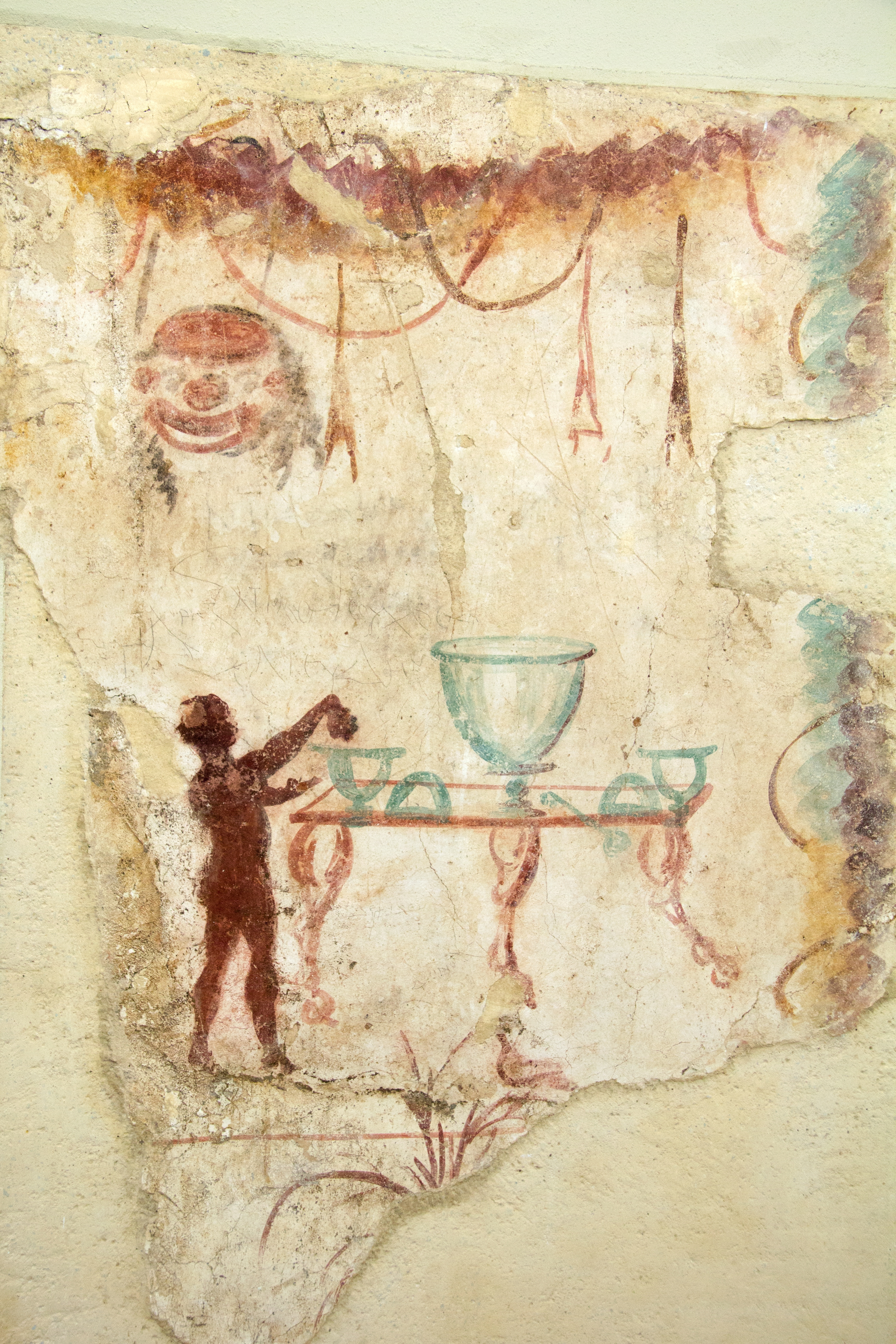
Preparing for Dionysiacal symposium. Mural painting from Delos, ca 100 BC.

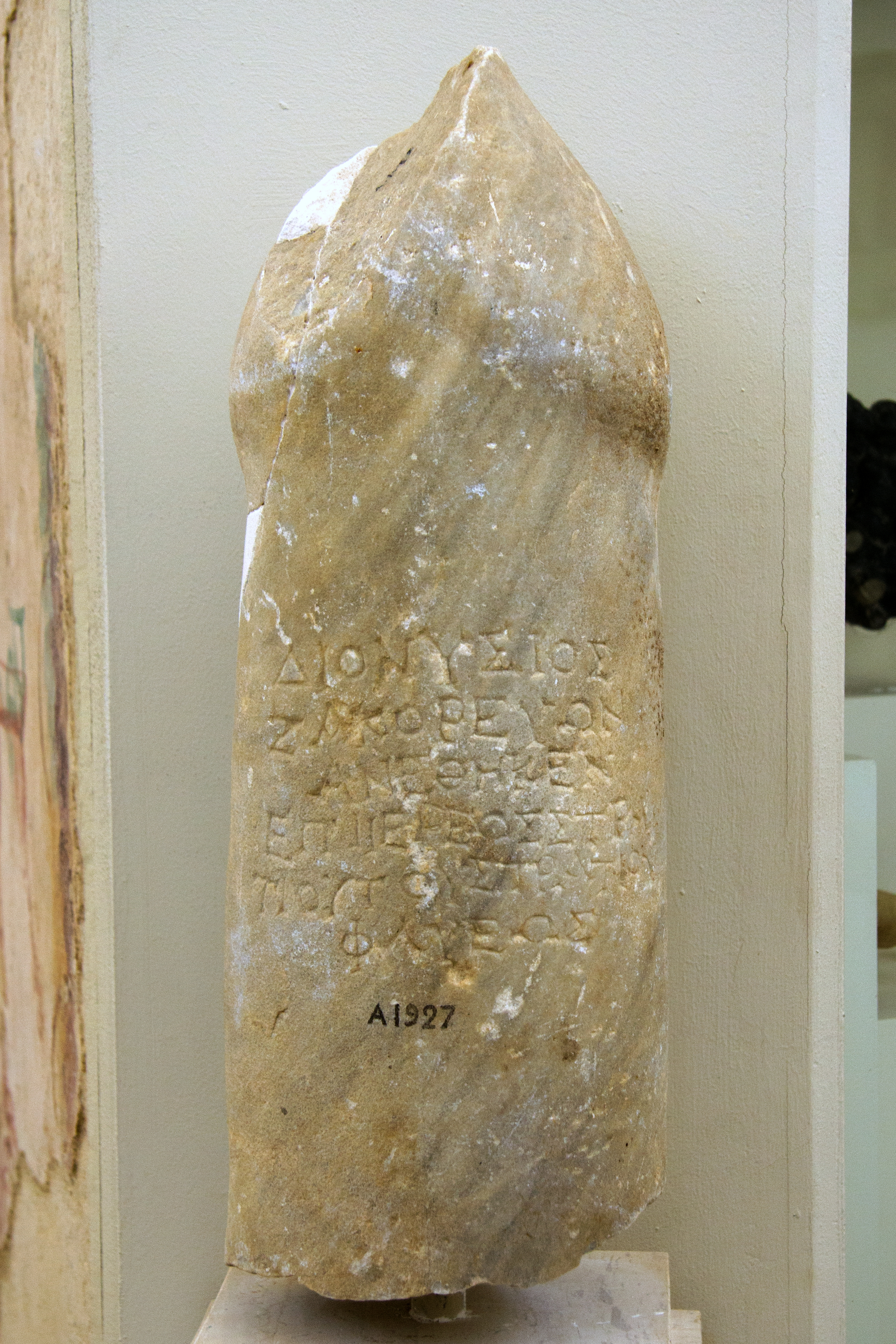
Larger stone fallos with the votive inscription.

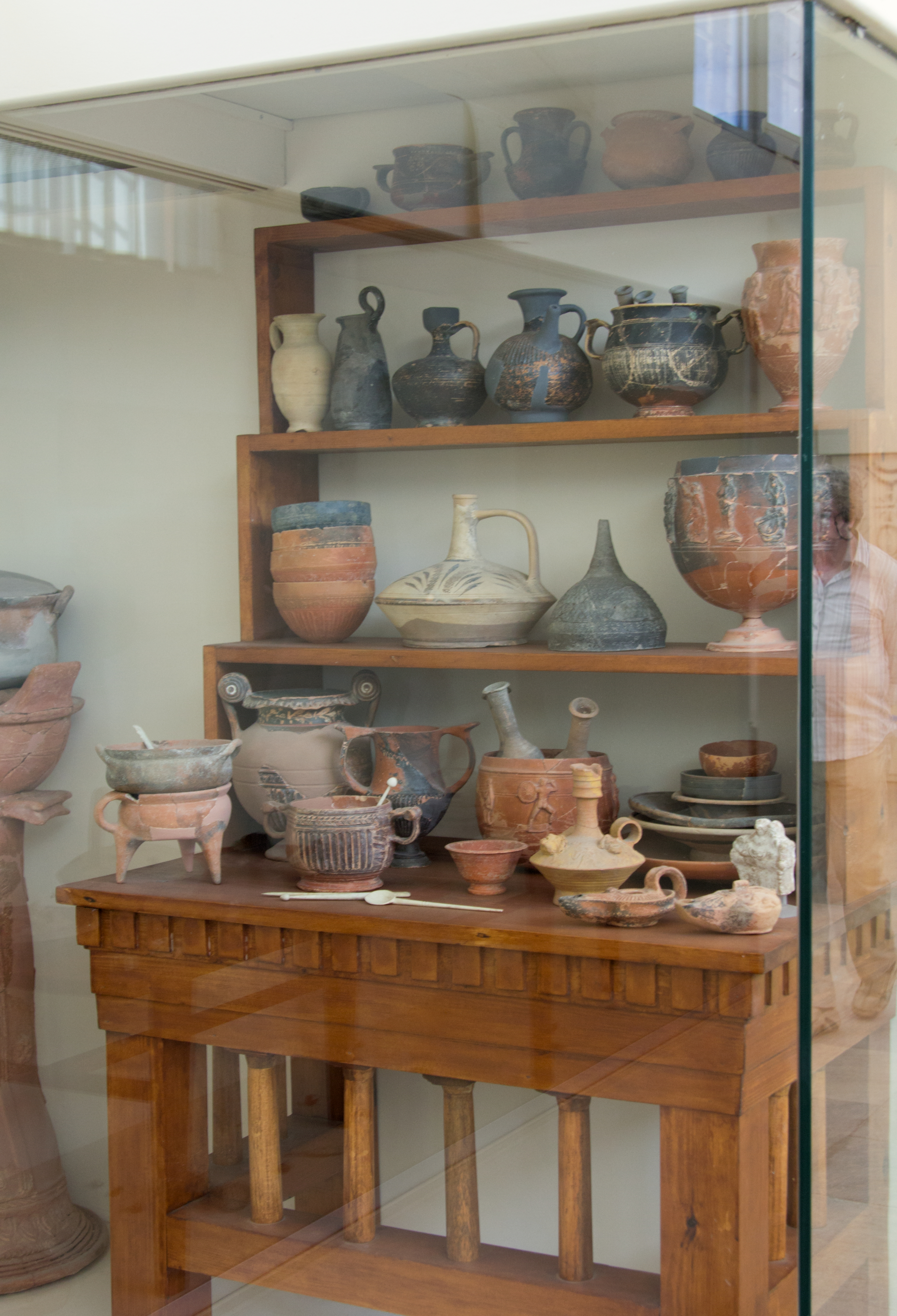
Dishes, Roman Age.

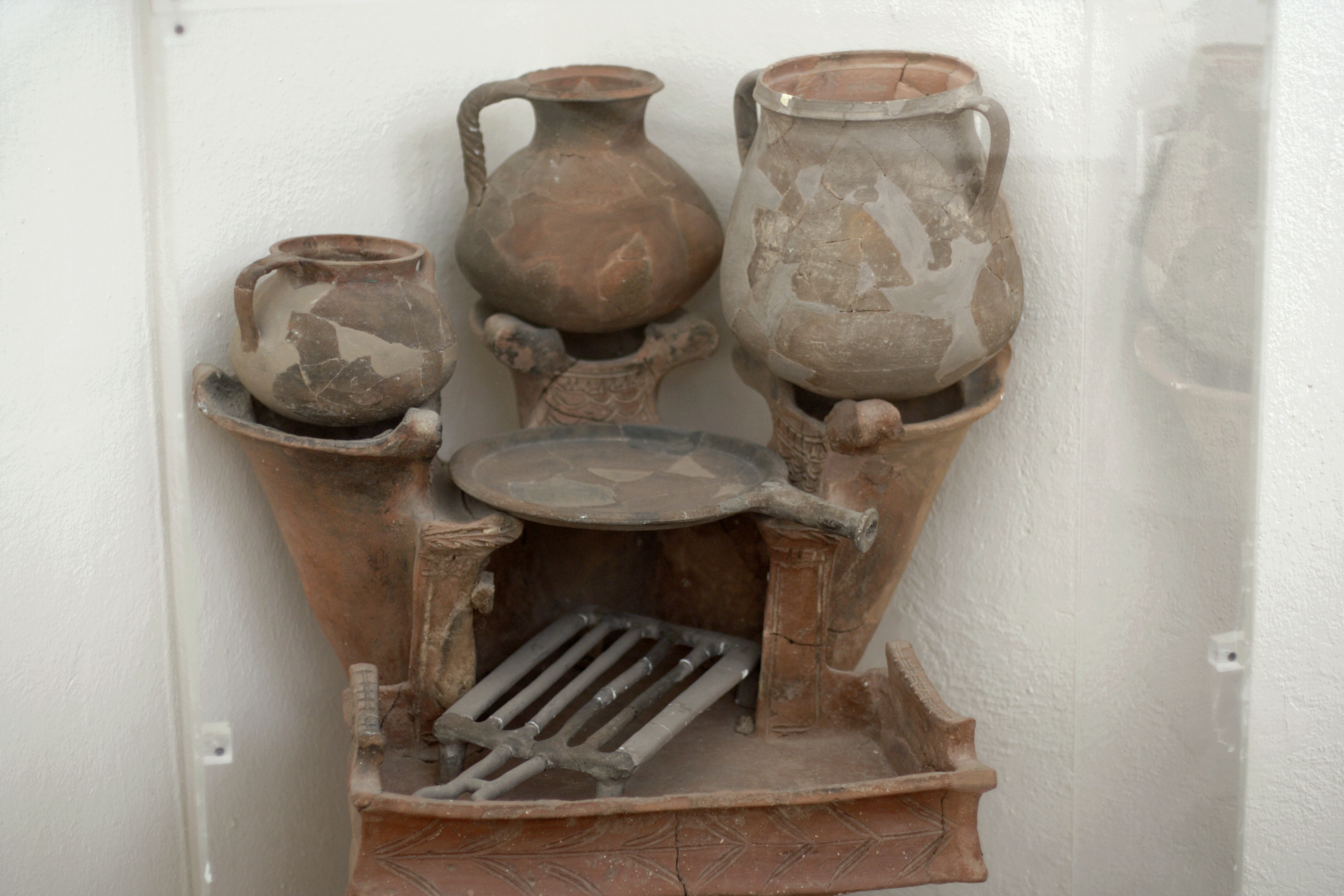
Roman era stove

== See also ==
- Delos -details of the heritage site
