= Minet el-Beida =

Archaeological site located in Syria

- المينا البيضا (Arabic)
- Ma'hadu
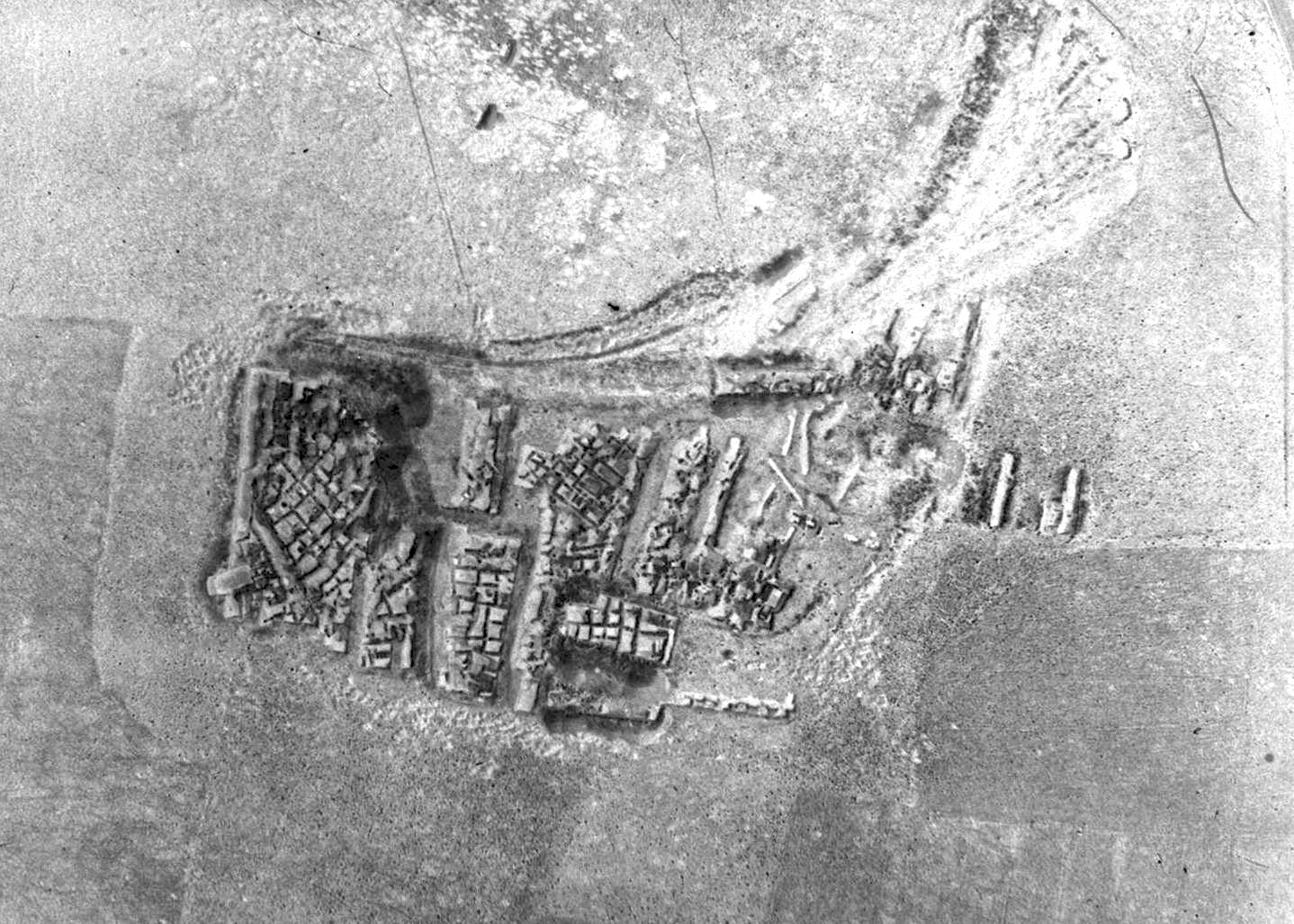
- 1933 aerial view of Minet el-Beida

- Location within Syria
- 35.607°N 35.776°E
- Type: settlement, port
- Periods: Bronze Age
- Cultures: Canaanite
- Satellite of: Ugarit
- Location: Latakia, Syria

History
- Built: late fifteenth century BC
- Event: Bronze Age collapse

Site notes
- Excavation dates: 1928—1935
- Archaeologists: Claude F. A. Schaeffer
- Owner: Public
- Public access: No

Minet el-Beida (Arabic: المينا البيضا, The White Harbor; or ancient Maʾḫadu) is a small bay located 10 kilometers (6.2 mi) north of Latakia, Syria on the Mediterranean Sea.

== History ==
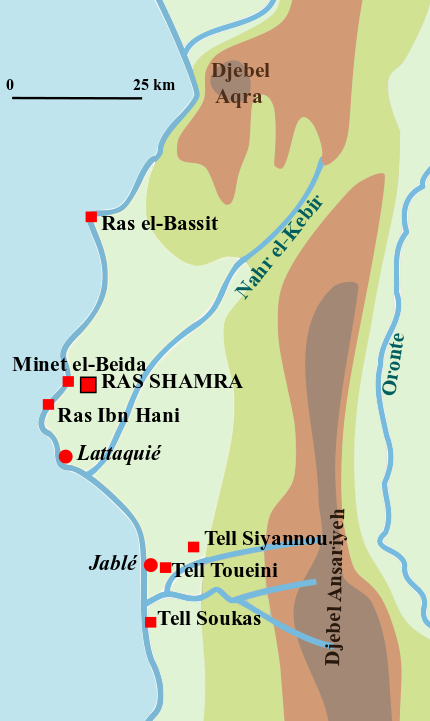
Minet el-Beida on the map of localities in the kingdom of Ugarit

It is an important archaeological site because it served as the harbor town and necropolis for Ugarit. The earliest archaeological findings at Minet el-Beida date to the Middle Bronze Age (MBA I) in 2100 BCE and the latest date to the Late Bronze Age (LBA III) in 1200 BCE. Due to its proximity to other civilizations and Minet el-Beida being the harbor town of Ugarit, the necropolis contained a lot of foreign items which shows the importance of the town as a commercial trade hub in the region.

== Archaeology ==
=== Mistress of the Animals ===
The 'Mistress of the Animals' is an elephant ivory engraving of a mythological scene depicting a Mistress of Animals feeding two wild goats. It was originally used as a lid for a pyxis, the vessel however was not found. It is thought to have been inpsired by Mycenaean votives. The lid dates to 1300 BCE - 1150 BCE.

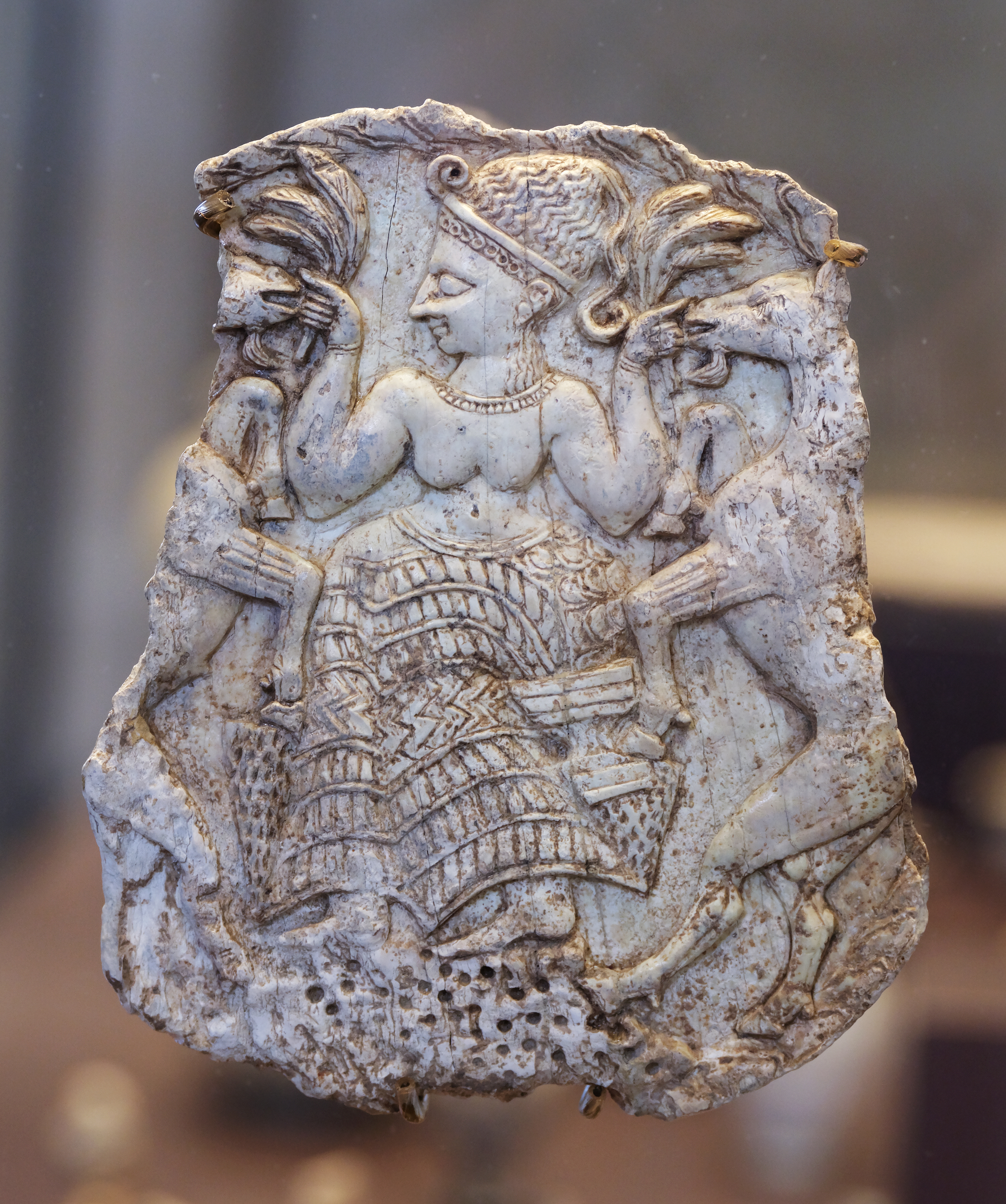
Mistress of the Animals feeding two wild goats, 1300 BCE - 1150 BCE.

=== Duck-shaped boxes ===
Two duck-shaped boxes have been found at Minet el-Beida made from hippopotamus ivory tusks dating to the 13th century BCE. They were likely used as containers for makeup and were found alongside other ivory containers and spindles.

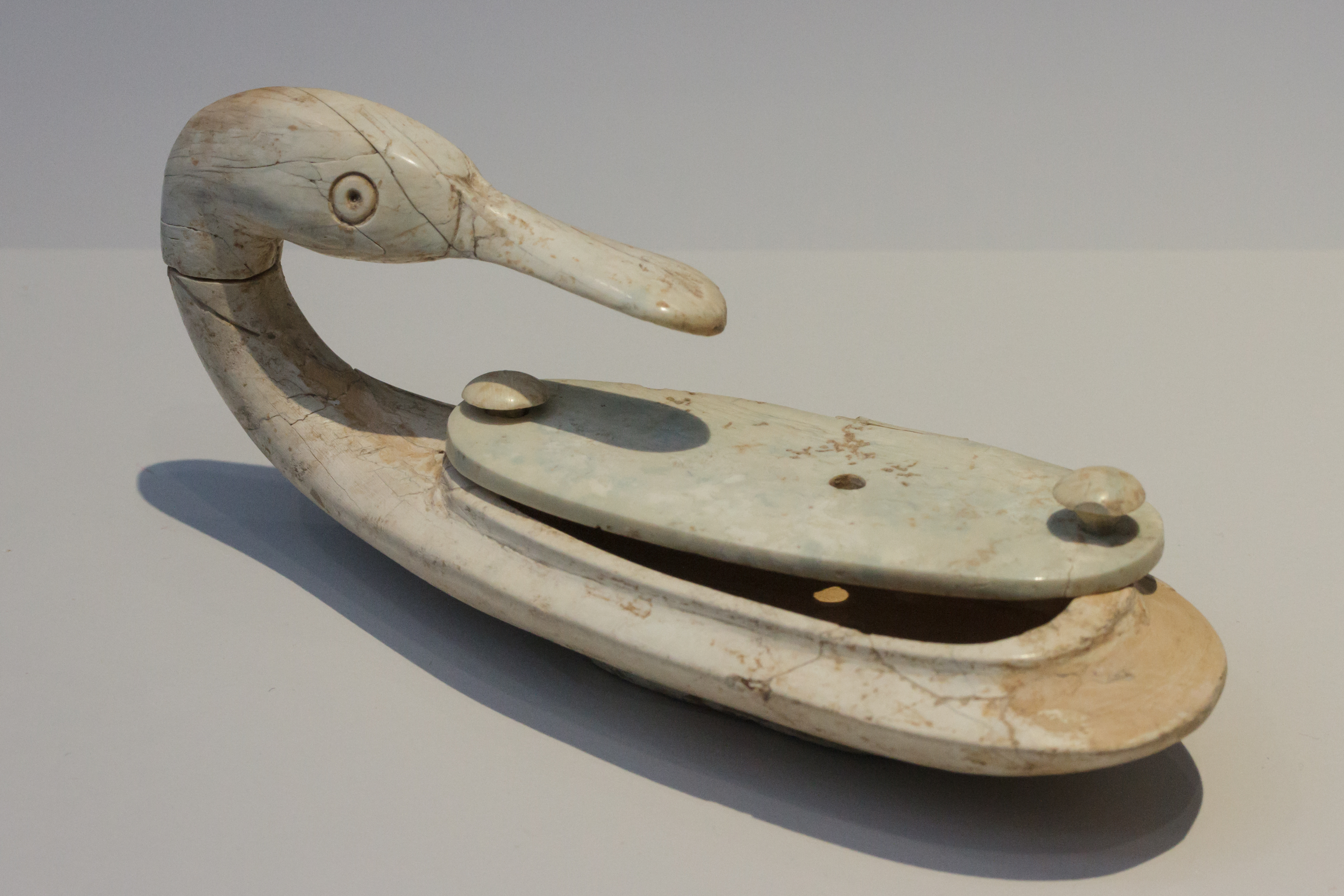
Duck-shaped box AO 14778, 13th century BCE.

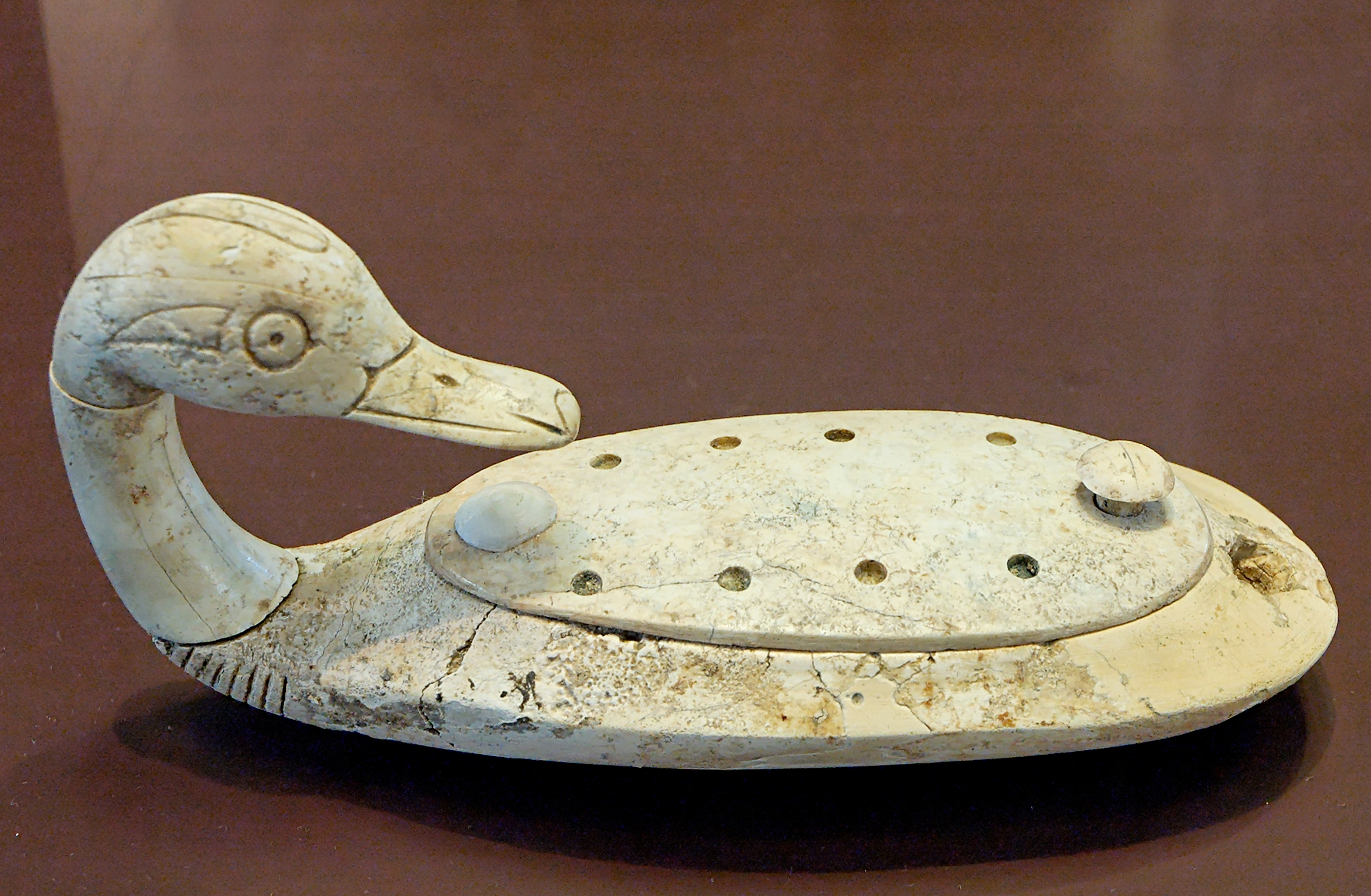
Duck-shaped box AO 14779, 13th century BCE.

=== Hathor statuettes ===
Multiple terracotta Hathor-style statuettes have been found at Minet el-Beida mostly dating to 14th-13th century BCE.

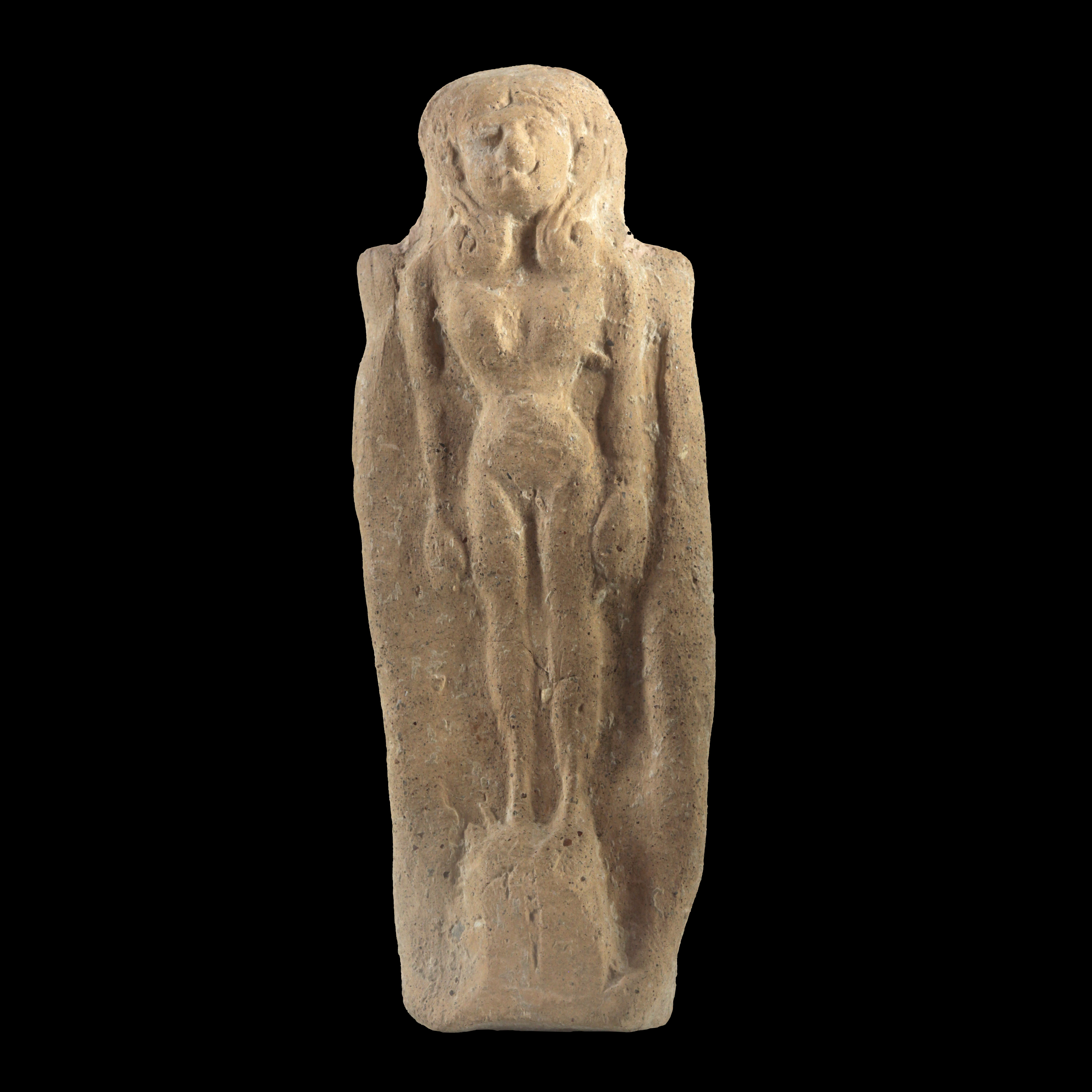
Hathor-style statuette, 14th-13th century BCE.

=== Cylinder seals ===
Multiple cylinder seals have been found at Minet el-Beida mostly dating to the 15th-13th century BCE. They were mostly made from steatite, chlorite and hematite and contained Egyptian-style engravings.

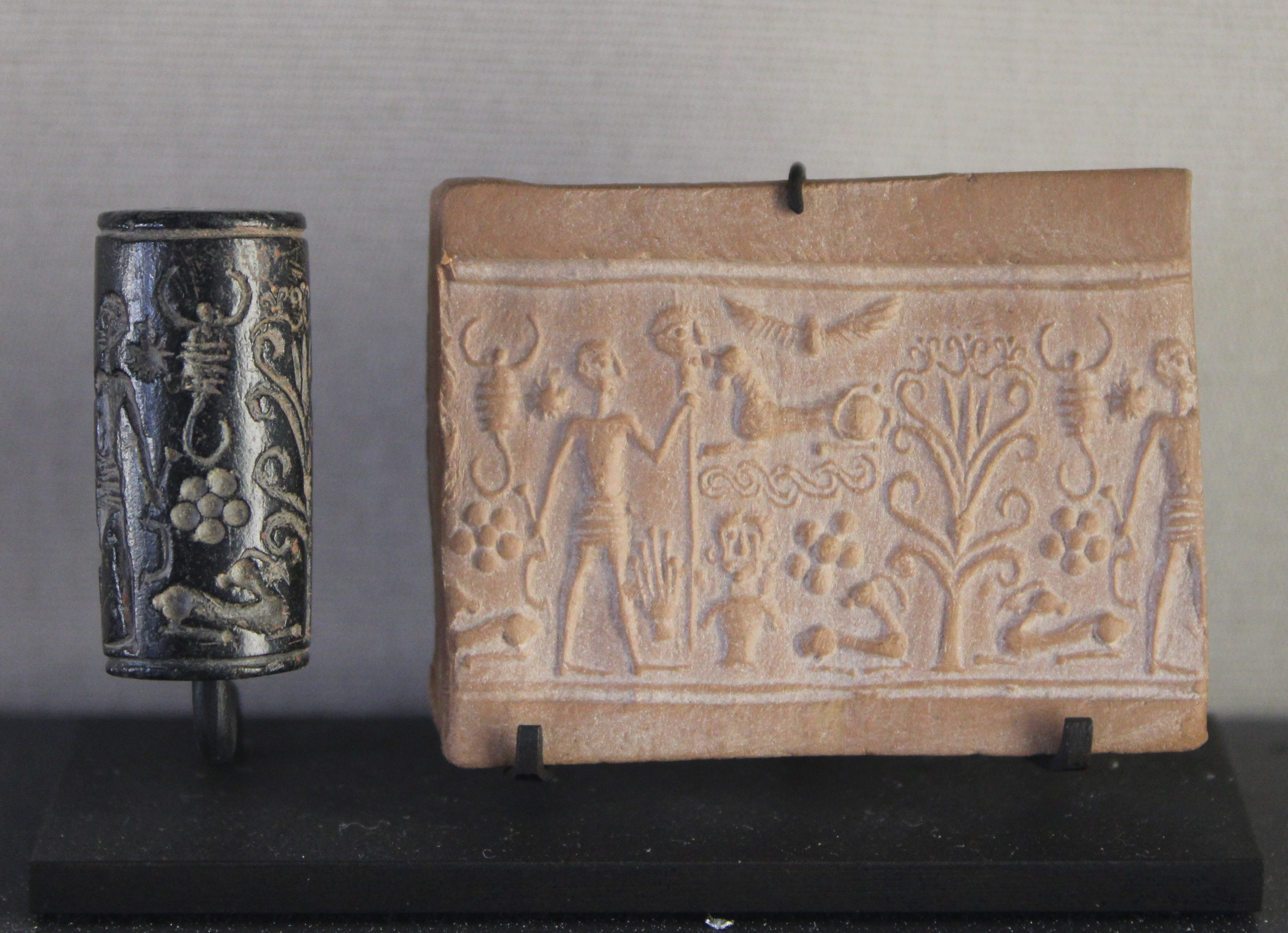
Steatite cylinder seal depicting a warrior holding a head stuck on a pike and various other symbols and figures, 14th-13th century BCE.

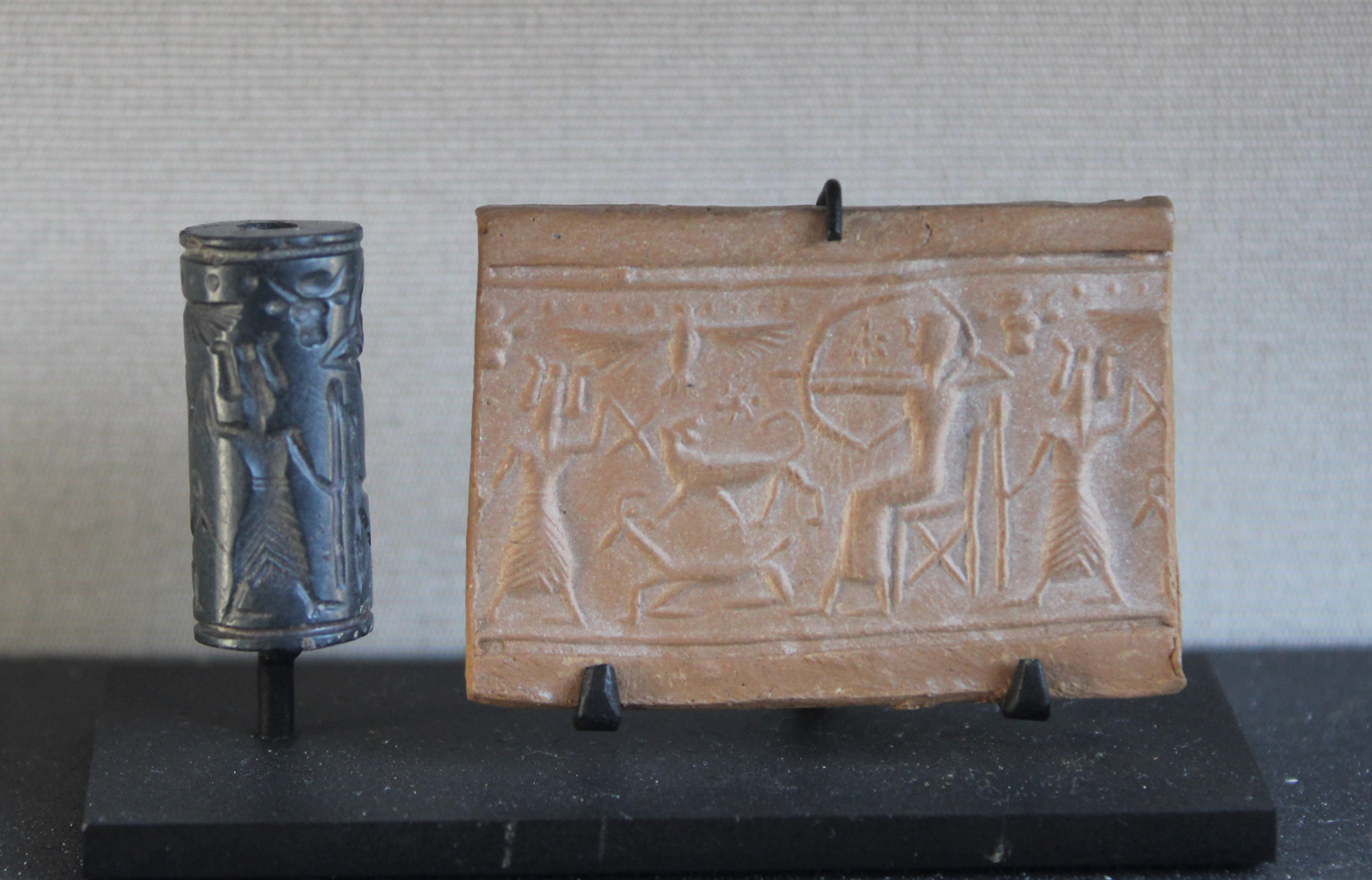
Hematite cylinder seal depicting a seated pharaoh hunting followed by a smaller deity with a crown and a pike, 15th-14th century BCE.

== See also ==
- Cities of the ancient Near East
