= Seated Woman of Çatalhöyük =

Neolithic sculpture found in Turkey

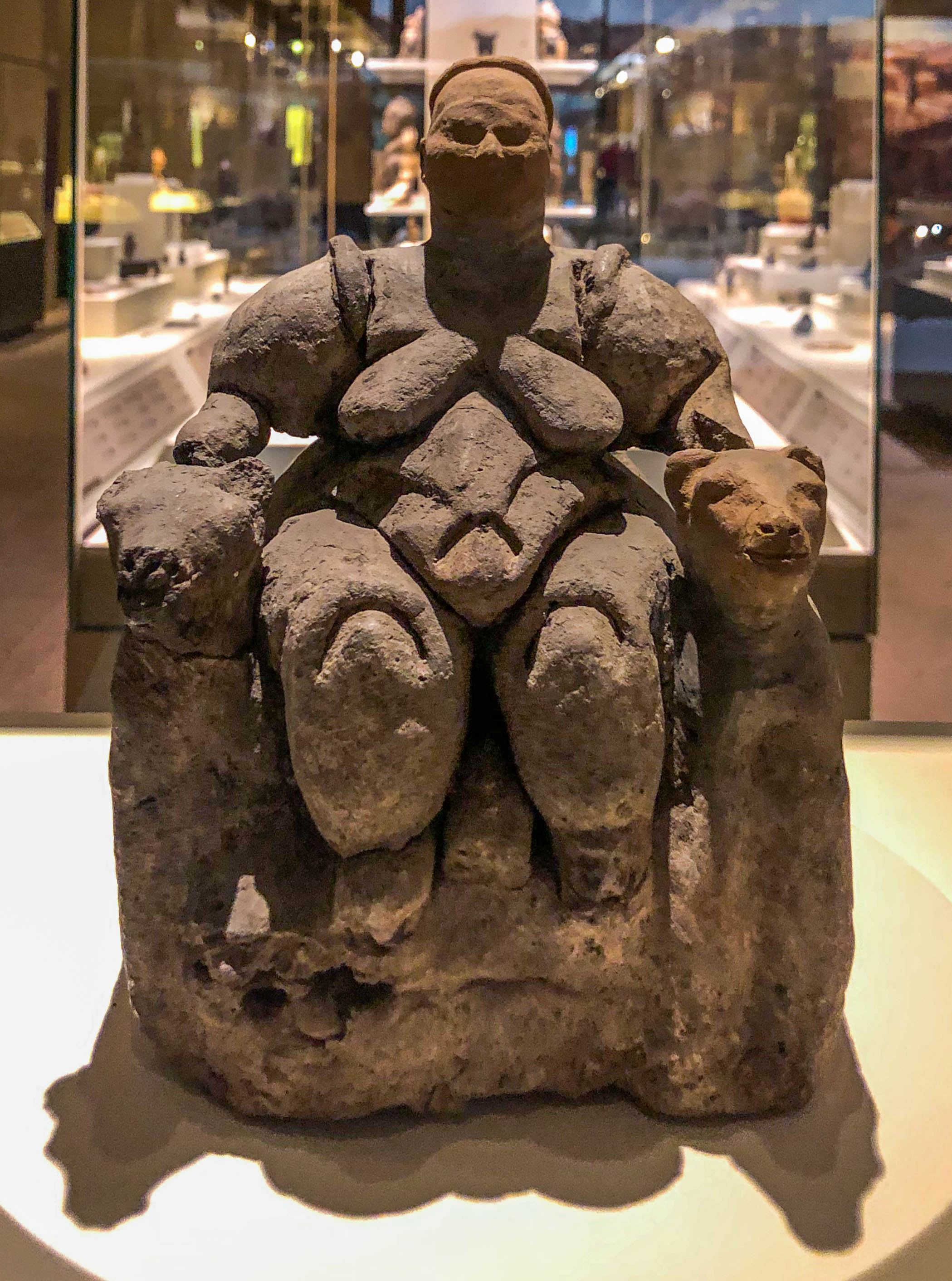
- Seated Woman of Çatal Höyük: the head and one arm rest are restorations
- Material: Clay
- Height: 12 cm
- Created: c. 6000 BC
- Discovered: 1961; Konya, Turkey
- Discovered by: James Mellaart
- Present location: Museum of Anatolian Civilizations, Ankara, Turkey

The Seated Woman of Çatalhöyük (also Çatal Höyük) is a baked-clay nude female form seated between feline-headed arm-rests. The figurine is 17 centimeters (6.7 inches) long, 11 centimeters (4.3 inches) wide, 12 centimeters (4.7 inches) high, and weighs 1 kilogram (2.2 pounds). It is generally thought to depict a corpulent and fertile Mother goddess in the process of giving birth while seated on her throne, which has two hand rests in the form of feline (lioness, leopard; panther) heads in a Mistress of Animals motif. The statuette, one of several iconographically similar ones found at the site, is similar to other corpulent prehistoric goddess figures, of which the most famous is the Venus of Willendorf.

It is a Neolithic sculpture shaped by an unknown artist, and was completed around 6000 BC. It was unearthed by archaeologist James Mellaart in 1961 at Çatalhöyük, Turkey. When it was found, its head and hand rest of the right side were missing. The current head and one hand rest are modern replacements. The sculpture is at the Museum of Anatolian Civilizations in Ankara, Turkey. Mellaart claimed that the figure represented a fertility goddess worshipped by the people of Çatalhöyük.

== See also ==
- Cybele
- List of Stone Age art
- Venus figurines
