= Mistress of the Animals (Minet el-Beida) =

Lid of a pyxis

- سيدة الحيوانات
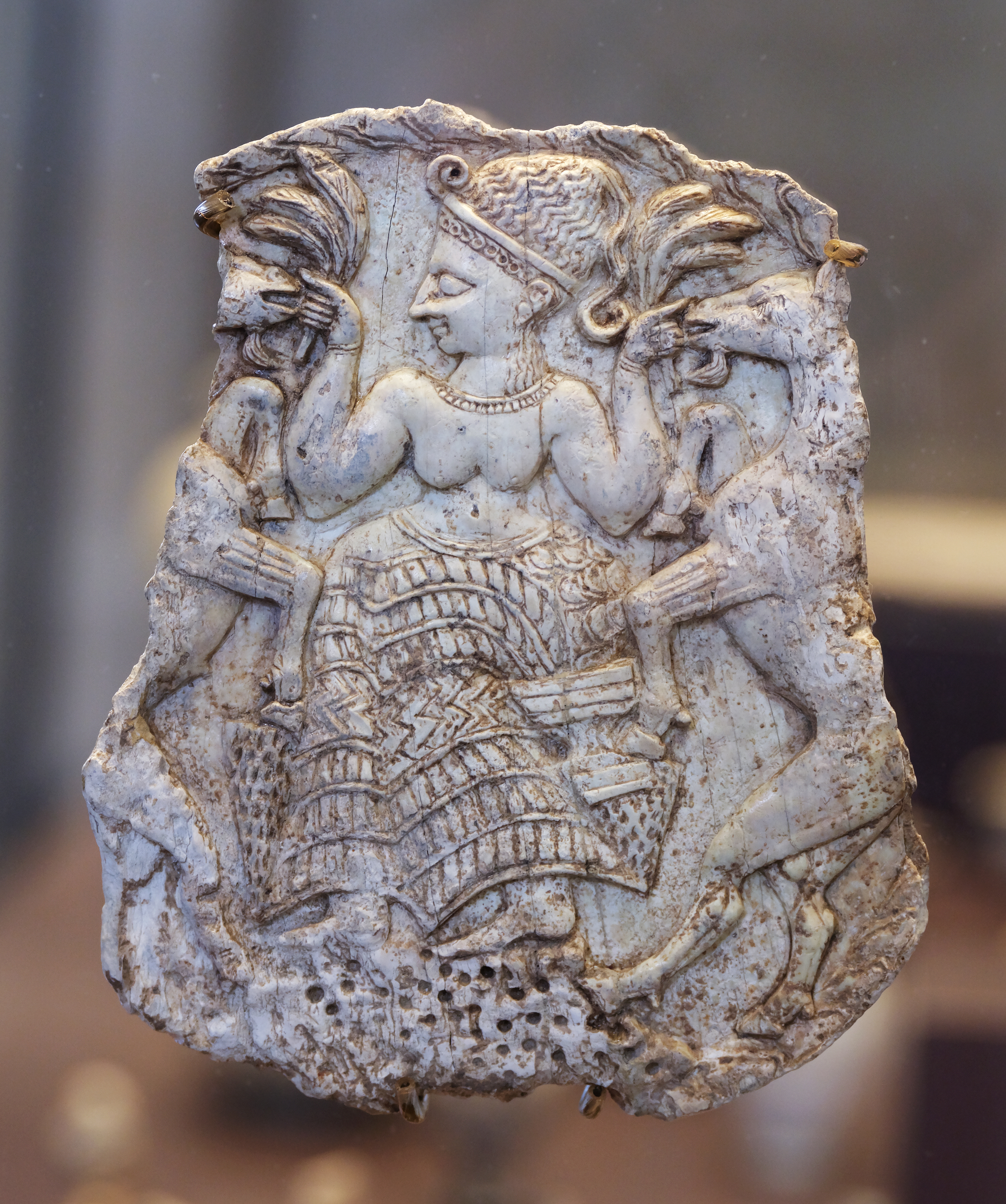
- Type: pyxis lid
- Material: Elephant Ivory
- Height: 13.7 cm (5.4 in)
- Width: 11.5 cm (4.5 in)
- Created: Late Bronze Age
- Discovered: 1929; Minet el-Beida
- Discovered by: Claude Frédéric-Armand Schaeffer
- Present location: Louvre Museum
- Identification: AO 11601 (Louvre)
- Culture: Ugarit

The Mistress of the Animals (French: Maîtresse des Animaux, Arabic: سيدة الحيوانات, romanized: Sayyidat al-Ḥayawānāt) or the Goddess feeding goats (French: Déesse nourrissant des caprins) is a Late Bronze Age pyxis lid from Minet el-Beida (Ugarit), Syria depicting a divine female figure nourishing two goats, commonly referred to as a Potnia Theron motif.

The lid was found in a tomb inside of the necropolis of Minet el-Beida, the harbour town of Ugarit. It is entirely made of elephant ivory and is 13.7cm x 11.5 cm (5.4 in x 4.5 in) in size. The lid has been dated to the Late Bronze Age (1300 BCE - 1150 BCE) and it depicts a mythological scene in which a 'Mistress of the Animals' is feeding two wild goats plants or corn sheaves ontop of a rock or mountain. The scene is thought to have been inspired by Mycenaean art depictions of female divinities of fertility. The lid is therefore also a good example of the extent of Bronze Age trading routes around the Eastern Mediterranean sea. The cylindrical vat of this lid (pyxis) has not been discovered, but there have been examples of other ivory pyxides discovered on the same site.

The lid was discovered in 1929 by a group of archaeologists led by Claude Frédéric-Armand Schaeffer while doing archaeological work on the site of Minet el-Beida and Ugarit. The lid was then donated to the Louvre collection on the 19th of January 1930. The lid has since been located in room 301 of the Louvre Museum.

There has been a lot of debate around the subject of the depiction. Some scholars have argued that the scene depicts Anat, the Ugaritic Goddess, as a Mistress of the animals, but there are no inscriptions on the lid itself confirming that it is Anat. Furthermore, the woman has also been ascribed as being Astarte, Asherah or Qudshu, although these are also still heavily debated.

== Gallery ==

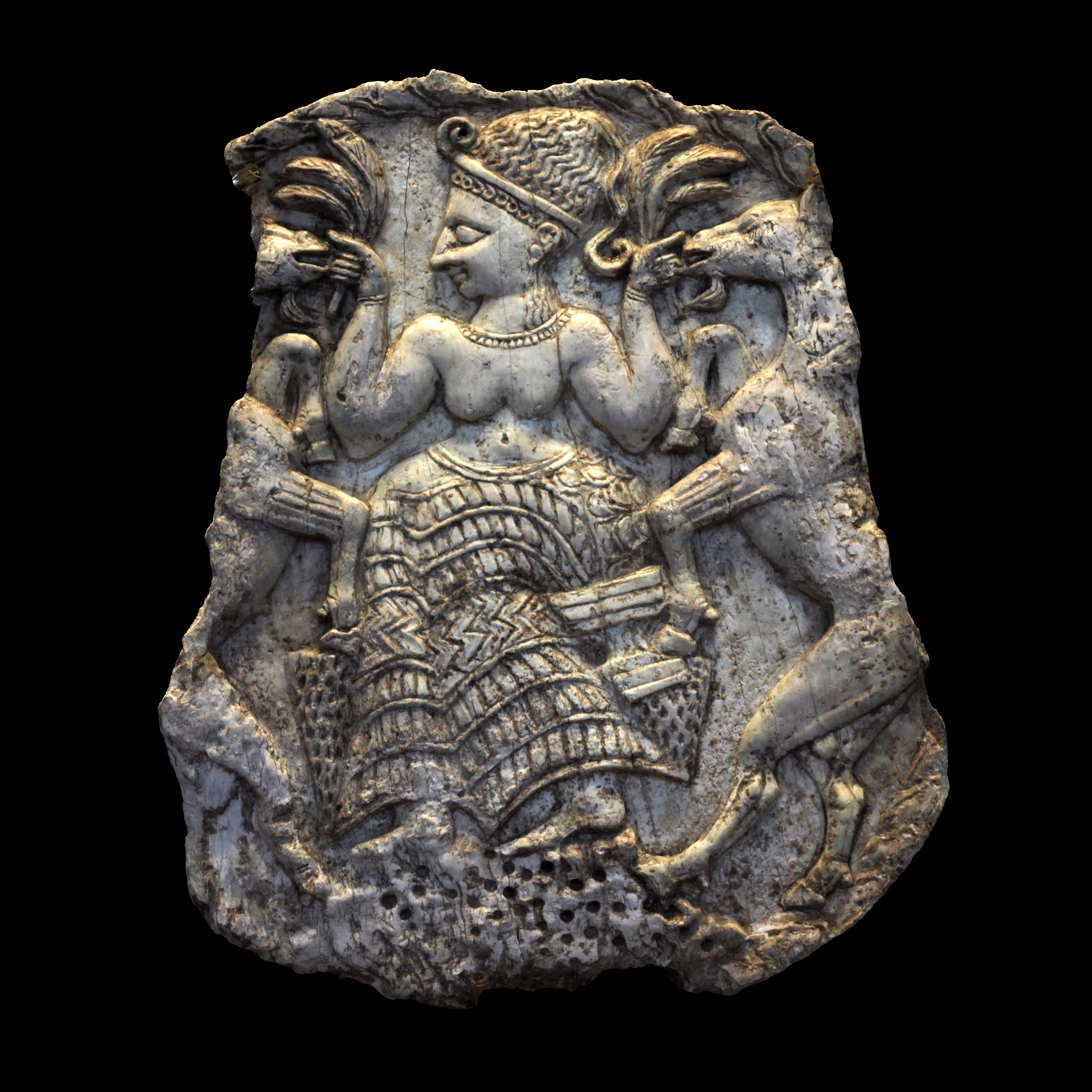

== See also ==
- Minet el-Beida
- Ugarit
- Potnia Theron
- Anat
