= Potnia Theron =

"Queen of Animals" motif in art and mythology

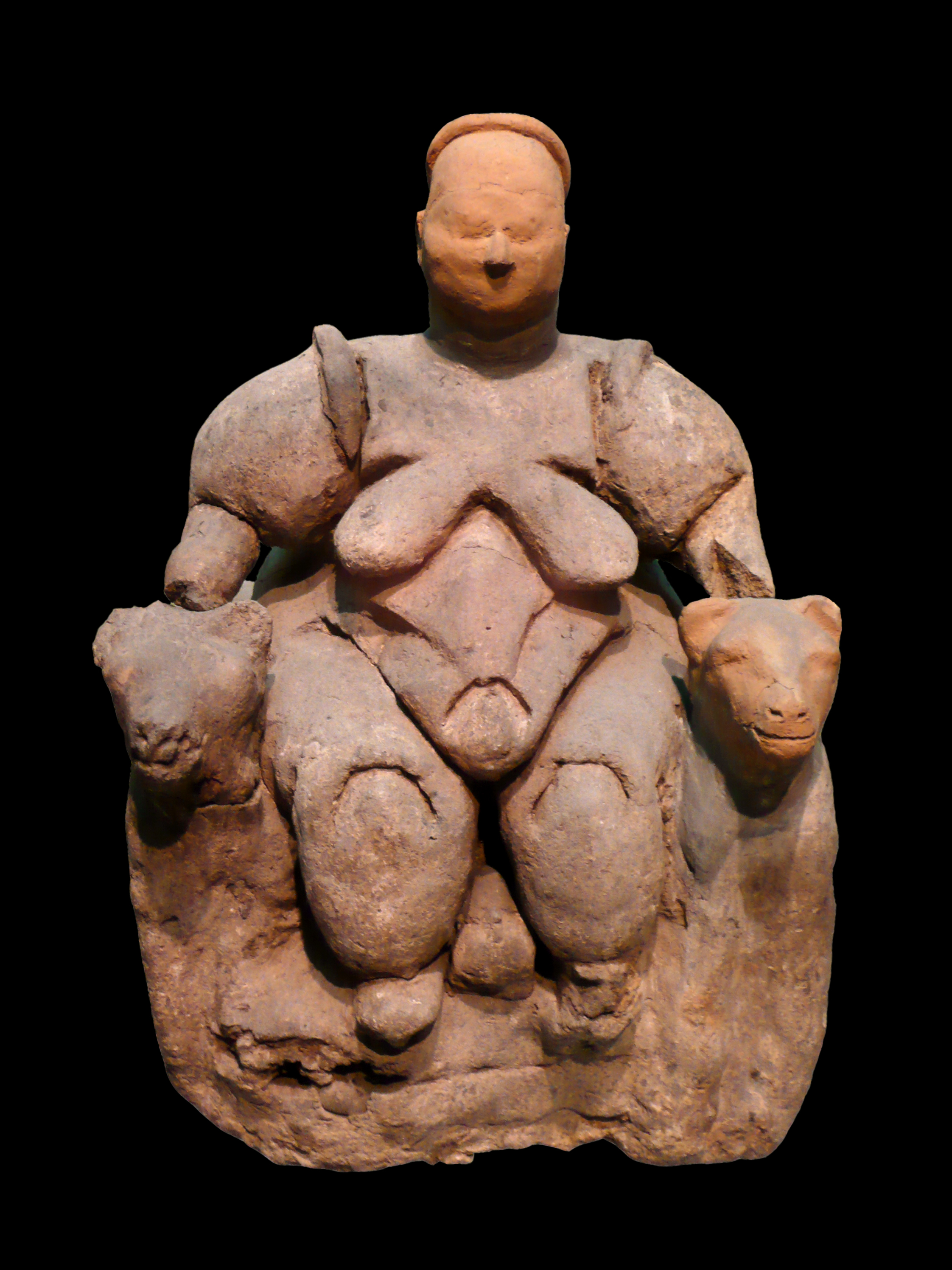
Seated woman of Çatalhöyük flanked by two lionesses

The Potnia Theron (Ancient Greek: Ἡ Πότνια Θηρῶν, romanized: Hē Pótnia Therôn, lit. 'The Lady of Animals', [hɛː pót.ni.a tʰɛː.rɔ̂ːn]) or Mistress of Animals is a widespread motif in ancient art from the Mediterranean world and the ancient Near East, showing a central human, or human-like, female figure who grasps two animals, one to each side. Although the connections between images and concepts in the various ancient cultures concerned remain very unclear, such images are often referred to by the Greek term Potnia Theron regardless of culture of origin.

The term is first used once by Homer as a descriptor of Artemis and often used to describe female divinities associated with animals. The word Potnia, meaning mistress or lady, was a Mycenaean Greek word inherited by Classical Greek, with the same meaning, cognate to Sanskrit patnī.

The oldest such depiction, the Seated Woman of Çatalhöyük, is a clay sculpture from Çatalhöyük in modern Turkey, made c 6,000 BC. This motif is more common in later Near Eastern and Mesopotamian art with a male figure, called the Master of Animals. Homer's mention of Potnia Theron refers to Artemis; Walter Burkert describes this mention as "a well established formula". An Artemis-type deity, a "Mistress of the Animals", is often assumed to have existed in prehistoric religion and often referred to as Potnia Theron with some scholars positing a relationship between Artemis and goddesses depicted in Minoan art.

An early example of Italian Potnia theròn is in the Museo civico archeologico di Monte Rinaldo in Italy: a plate illustrates a goddess that wears a long dress and holds hands with two lionesses.

In the Aeneid, Virgil mentions that within Psychro's Cave, in Crete, there lived the goddess Cybele whose chariot was drawn by two lions.

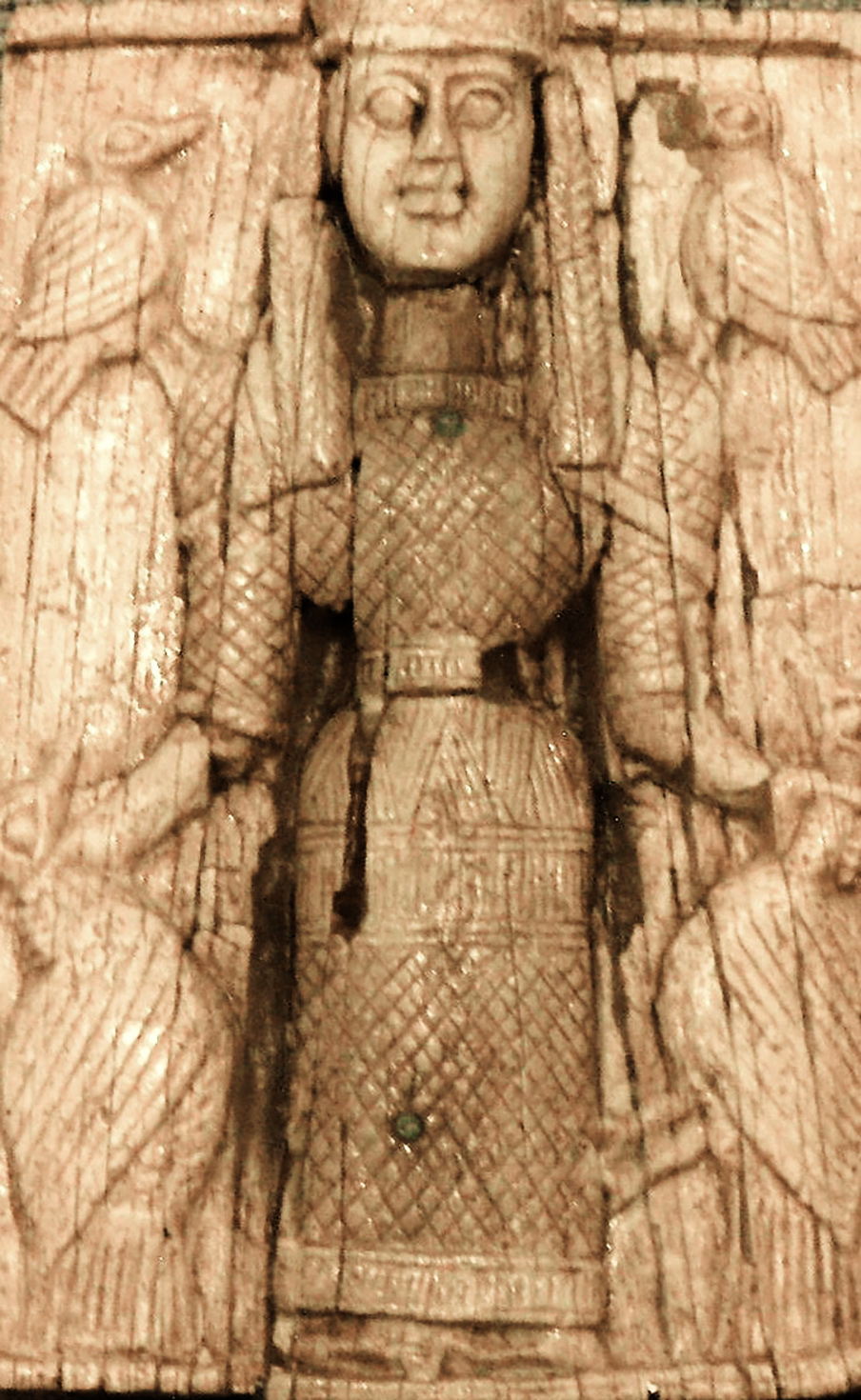
Artemis Orthia in the usual stance of Potnia Theron on an archaic ivory votive offering, (National Archaeological Museum of Athens)

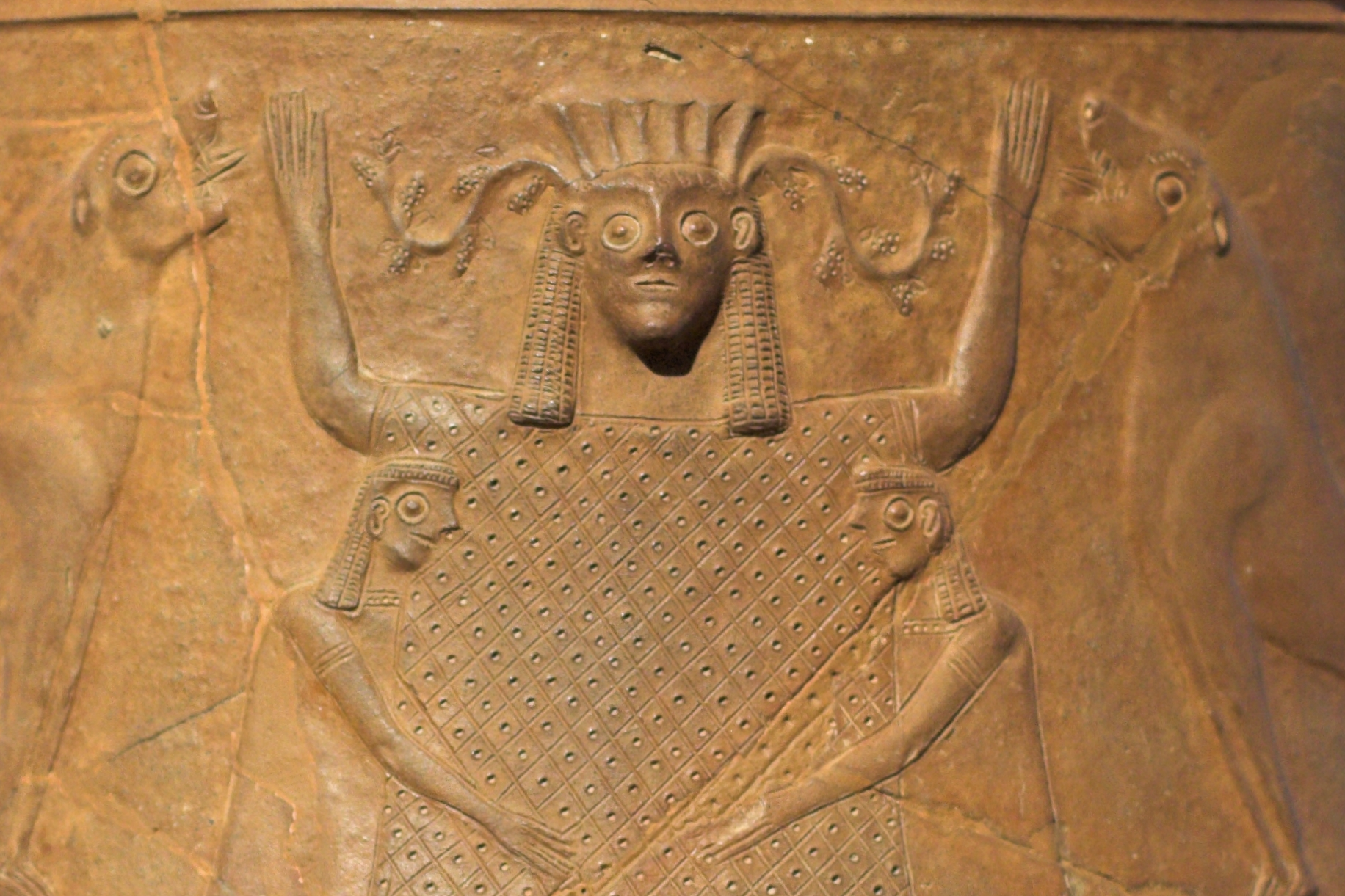
Relief on a pithos, 625-600 BC. National Archaeological Museum of Athens

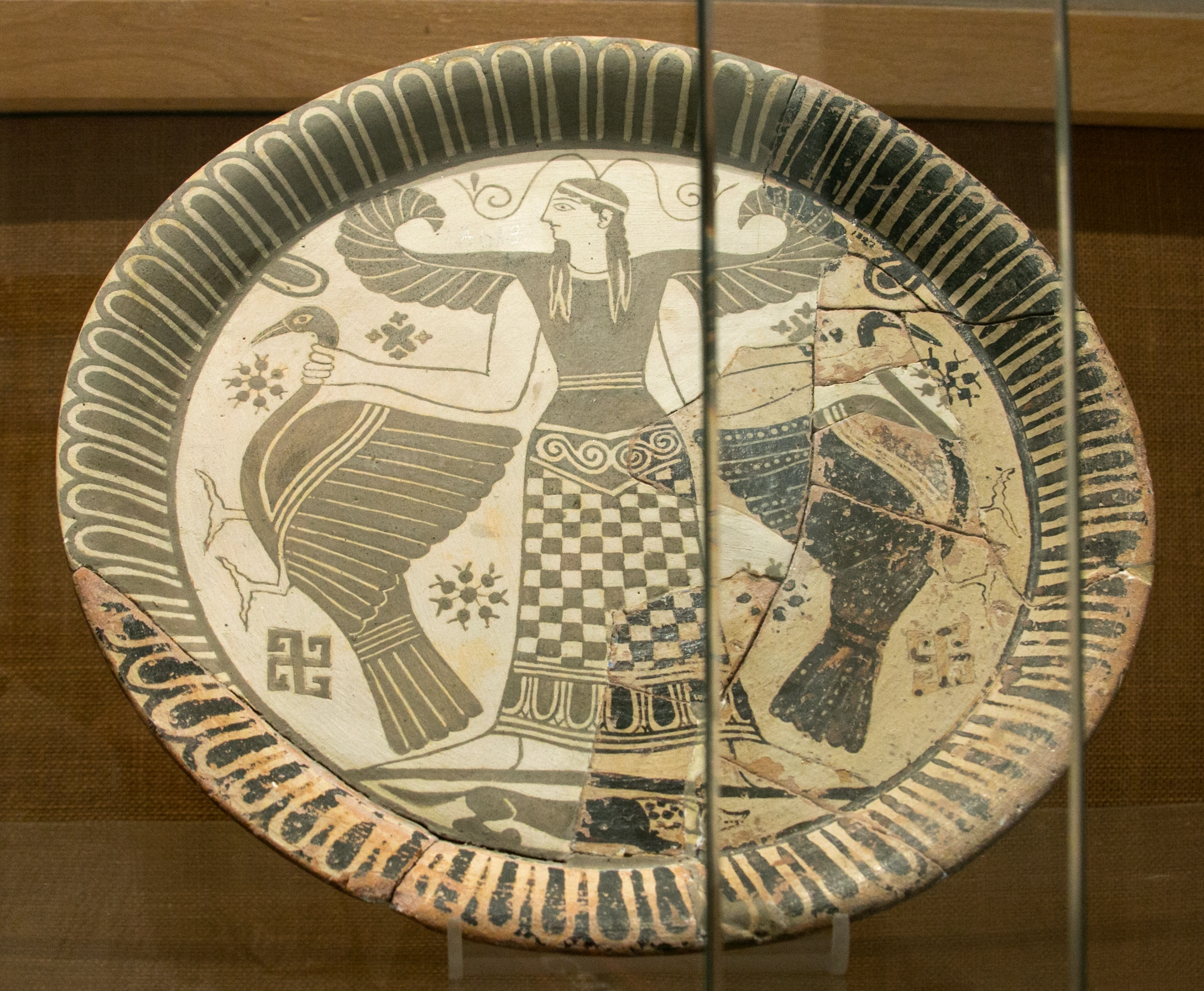
Hypothetical restoration Artemis as Mistress of Animals, Parian pottery, 675–600 BC

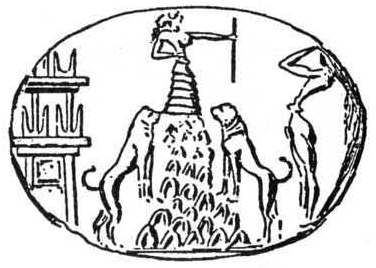
Minoan goddess flanked by two lionesses (note the tufted tails)

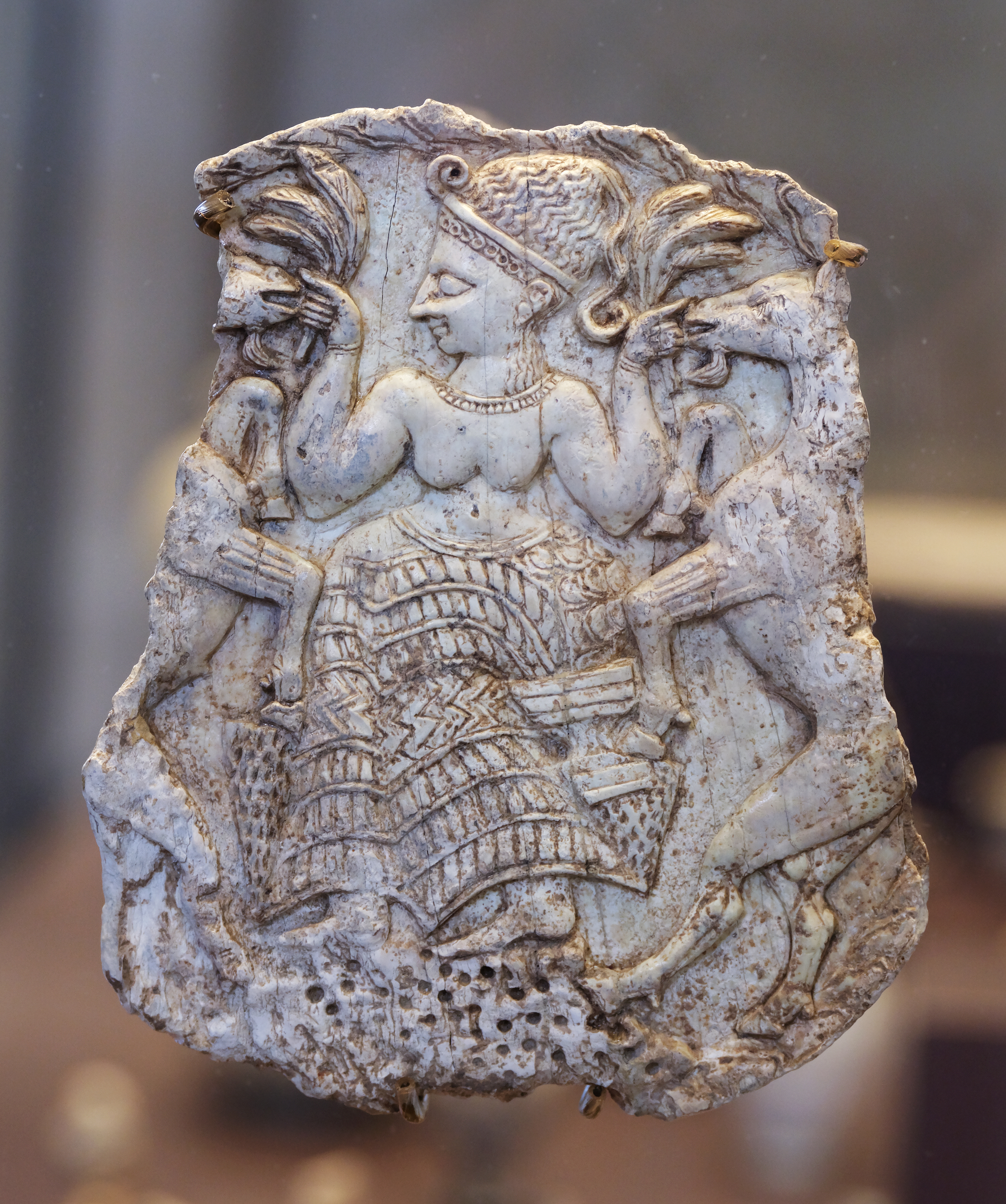
Mistress of the Animals (Minet el-Beida)

== See also ==
- Master of Animals
- Inara (goddess)
- Iphigenia
- Potnia
