= Bronze Age =

Historical period (c. 3300–1200 BCE)

- c. 3000 BC – c. 1200 BC
Copper Age	Iron Age
- Diffusion of metallurgy in Europe and Asia Minor—the darkest areas are the oldest.
- Location: Asia; Near East; Europe; North Africa
- Key events: Extensive bronze metallurgy; Late Bronze Age collapse; Development of writing; Development of the chariot

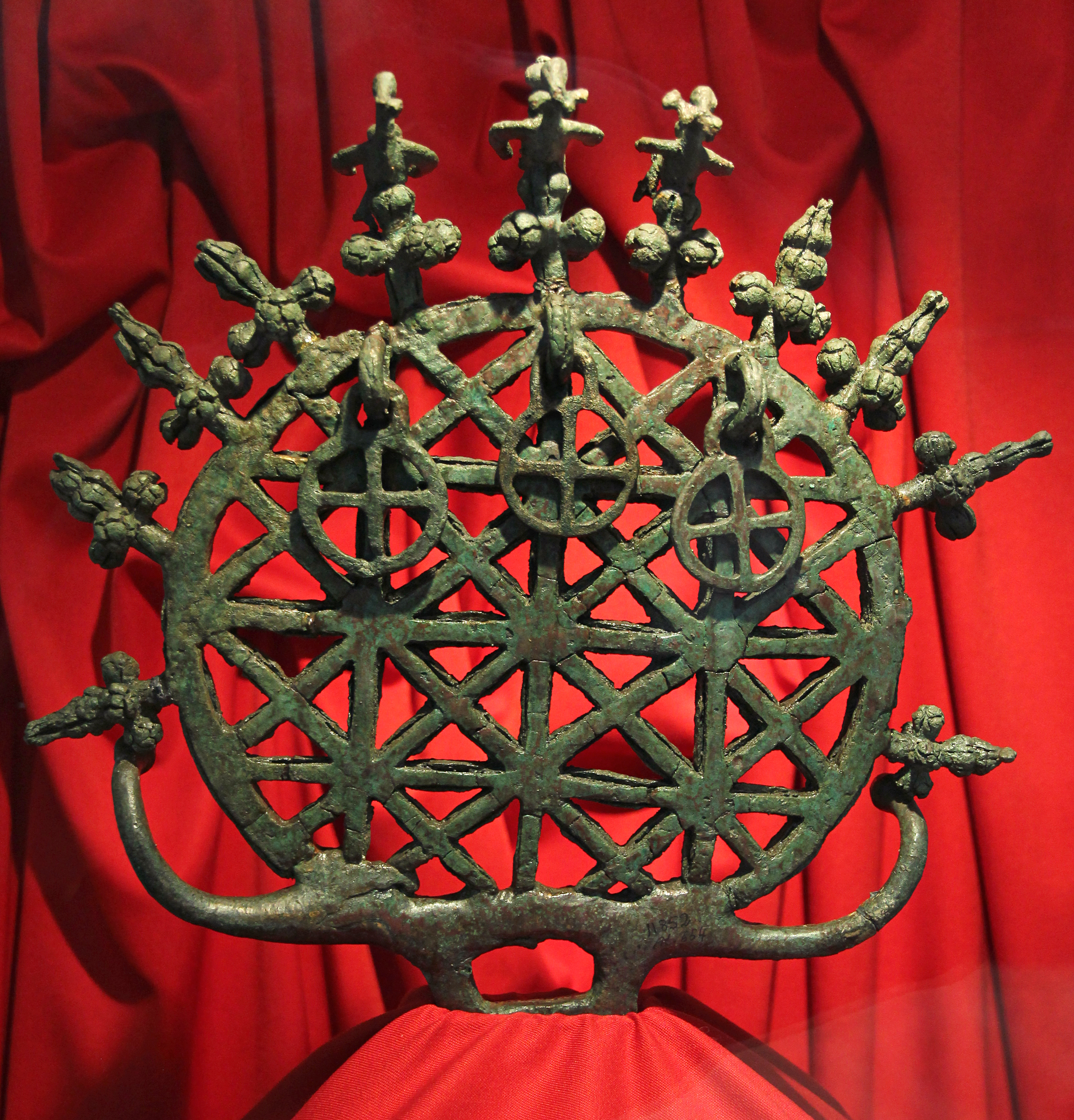
One of the Alaca Höyük bronze standards from a pre-Hittite tomb dating to the 3rd millennium BC, from the Museum of Anatolian Civilizations in Ankara

The Bronze Age is an archaeological and anthropological term defining a phase in the development of material culture among ancient societies in Asia, the Near East and Europe. An ancient civilisation or culture is deemed part of the Bronze Age if it either produced bronze by smelting its own copper and alloying it with tin, arsenic, or other metals, or traded other items for bronze from producing areas elsewhere. The Bronze Age is the middle principal period of the three-age system, following the Stone Age and preceding the Iron Age. Conceived as a global era, the Bronze Age follows the Neolithic ("New Stone") period, with a transition period between the two known as the Chalcolithic ("copper-Stone") Age. These technical developments took place at different times in different places, and therefore each region's history is framed by a different chronological system, but the Bronze Age had begun in much of the Old World by 3,000 BC.

Bronze Age cultures were the first to develop writing. According to archaeological evidence, cultures in Mesopotamia, which used cuneiform script, and Egypt, which used hieroglyphs, developed the earliest practical writing systems. In a particular region, whichever comes first of the arrival of the Iron Age, or the development of writing, is usually taken to mark the end of the Bronze Age, as history replaces prehistory; this is not always the case in the earliest areas to develop writing. In the archaeology of the Americas, a five-period system is conventionally used instead, which does not include a Bronze Age, though some cultures there did smelt copper and bronze. No evidence of metalworking has been found on the Australian continent prior to the establishment of European settlements in 1788.

In many areas bronze continued to be rare and expensive, mainly because of difficulties in obtaining enough tin, which occurs in relatively few places, unlike the very common copper. It is likely that the earliest tin deposits were alluvial and perhaps exploited by the same methods used for panning gold in placer deposits. Some societies appear to have gone through much of the Bronze Age using bronze only for weapons or elite art, such as Chinese ritual bronzes, with ordinary farmers largely still using stone tools. However, this is hard to assess as the rarity of bronze meant it was keenly recycled.

== Metal use ==
Bronze Age civilisations gained a technological advantage due to bronze's harder and more durable properties than other metals available at the time. While terrestrial iron is naturally abundant, the higher temperature required for smelting, 1,250 °C (2,280 °F), in addition to the greater difficulty of working with it, placed it out of reach of common use until the end of the 2nd millennium BC. Tin's lower melting point of 232 °C (450 °F) and copper's moderate melting point of 1,085 °C (1,985 °F) placed both these metals within the capabilities of Neolithic pottery kilns, which date to 6000 BC and were able to produce temperatures of at least 900 °C (1,650 °F).

The Bronze Age is characterised by the widespread use of bronze, though the introduction and development of bronze technology were not universally synchronous. Bronze was independently discovered in the Maykop culture of the North Caucasus as early as the mid-4th millennium BC, which makes them the producers of the oldest-known bronze. However, the Maykop culture only had arsenical bronze. Other regions developed bronze and its associated technology at different periods. Tin bronze technology requires systematic techniques: tin must be mined (mainly as the tin ore cassiterite) and smelted separately, then added to hot copper to make bronze alloy. The Bronze Age was a time of extensive use of metals and the development of trade networks.

A 2013 report suggests that the earliest tin-alloy bronze was a foil dated to the mid-5th millennium BC from a Vinča culture site in Pločnik, Serbia, although this culture is not conventionally considered part of the Bronze Age; however, the dating of the foil has been disputed.

== Near East ==
West Asia and the Near East were the first regions to enter the Bronze Age, beginning with the rise of the Mesopotamian civilization of Sumer in the mid-4th millennium BC. Cultures in the ancient Near East practised intensive year-round agriculture; developed writing systems; invented the potter's wheel, created centralised governments (usually in the form of hereditary monarchies), formulated written law codes, developed city-states, nation-states and empires; embarked on advanced architectural projects; and introduced social stratification, economic and civil administration, slavery, and practised organised warfare, medicine, and religion. Societies in the region laid the foundations for astronomy, mathematics, and astrology.

The following dates are approximate.

=== Near East Bronze Age divisions ===
The Bronze Age in the Near East can be divided into Early, Middle and Late periods. The dates and phases below apply solely to the Near East, not universally. However, some archaeologists propose a "high chronology", which extends periods such as the Intermediate Bronze Age by 300 to 500–600 years, based on material analysis of the southern Levant in cities such as Hazor, Jericho, and Beit She'an.

- Early Bronze Age (EBA or EB): 3300–2100 BC
  - 3300–3000: EBA I
  - 3000–2700: EBA II
  - 2700–2200: EBA III
  - 2200–2100: EBA IV
- Middle Bronze Age (MBA or MB) or Intermediate Bronze Age (IBA or IB): 2100–1550 BC
  - 2100–2000: MBA I
  - 2000–1750: MBA II A
  - 1750–1650: MBA II B
  - 1650–1550: MBA II C
- Late Bronze Age (LBA or LB): 1550–1200 BC
  - 1550–1400: LBA I
  - 1400–1300: LBA II A
  - 1300–1200: LBA II B (Late Bronze Age collapse)

=== Anatolia ===
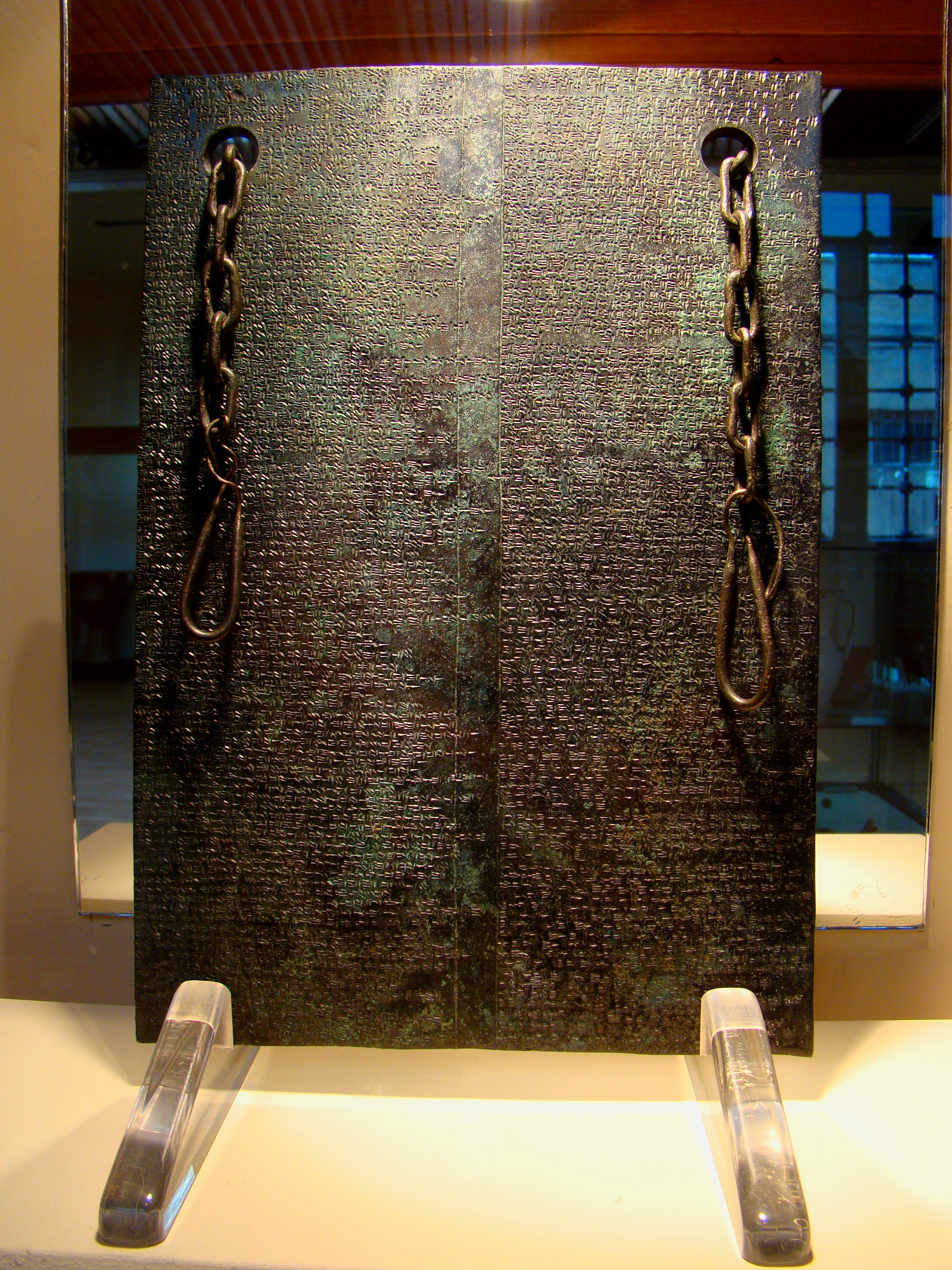
Hittite bronze tablet from Çorum-Boğazköy dating from 1235 BC, Museum of Anatolian Civilizations, Ankara

The Hittite Empire was established during the 18th century BC in Hattusa, northern Anatolia. At its height in the 14th century BC, the Hittite Kingdom encompassed central Anatolia, southwestern Syria as far as Ugarit, and upper Mesopotamia. After 1180 BC, amid general turmoil in the Levant, which is conjectured to have been associated with the sudden arrival of the Sea Peoples, the kingdom disintegrated into several independent "Neo-Hittite" city-states, some of which survived into the 8th century BC.

Arzawa, in Western Anatolia, during the second half of the 2nd millennium BC, likely extended along southern Anatolia in a belt from near the Turkish Lakes region to the Aegean coast. Arzawa was the western neighbour of the Middle and New Hittite Kingdoms, at times a rival and, at other times, a vassal.

The Assuwa league was a confederation of states in western Anatolia defeated by the Hittites under the earlier Tudhaliya I c. 1400 BC. Arzawa has been associated with the more obscure Assuwa generally located to its north. It probably bordered it, and may have been an alternative term for it during some periods.

=== Egypt ===
==== Early Bronze dynasties ====
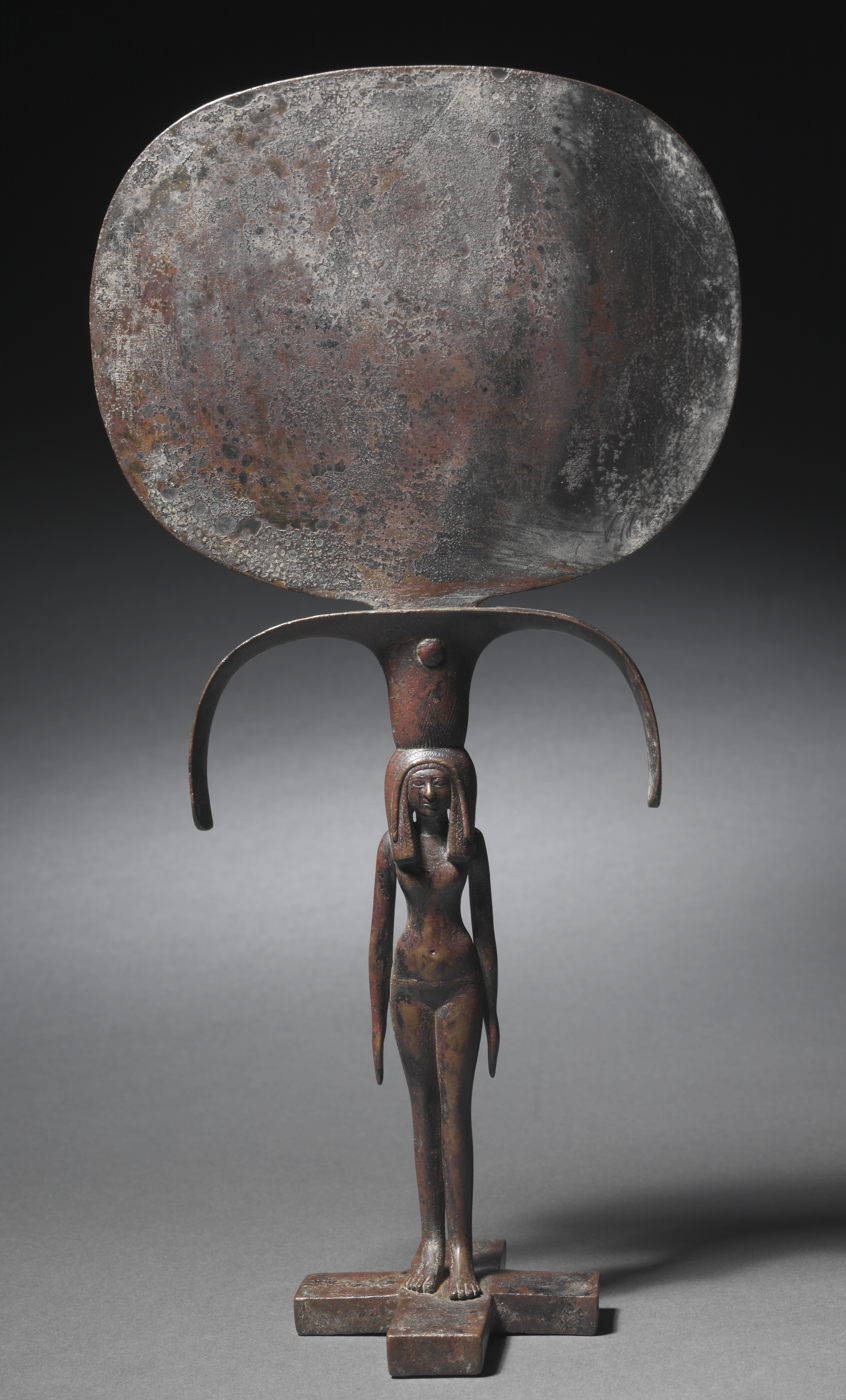
Bronze mirror with a female human figure at the base, Eighteenth Dynasty of Egypt (1540–1296 BC)

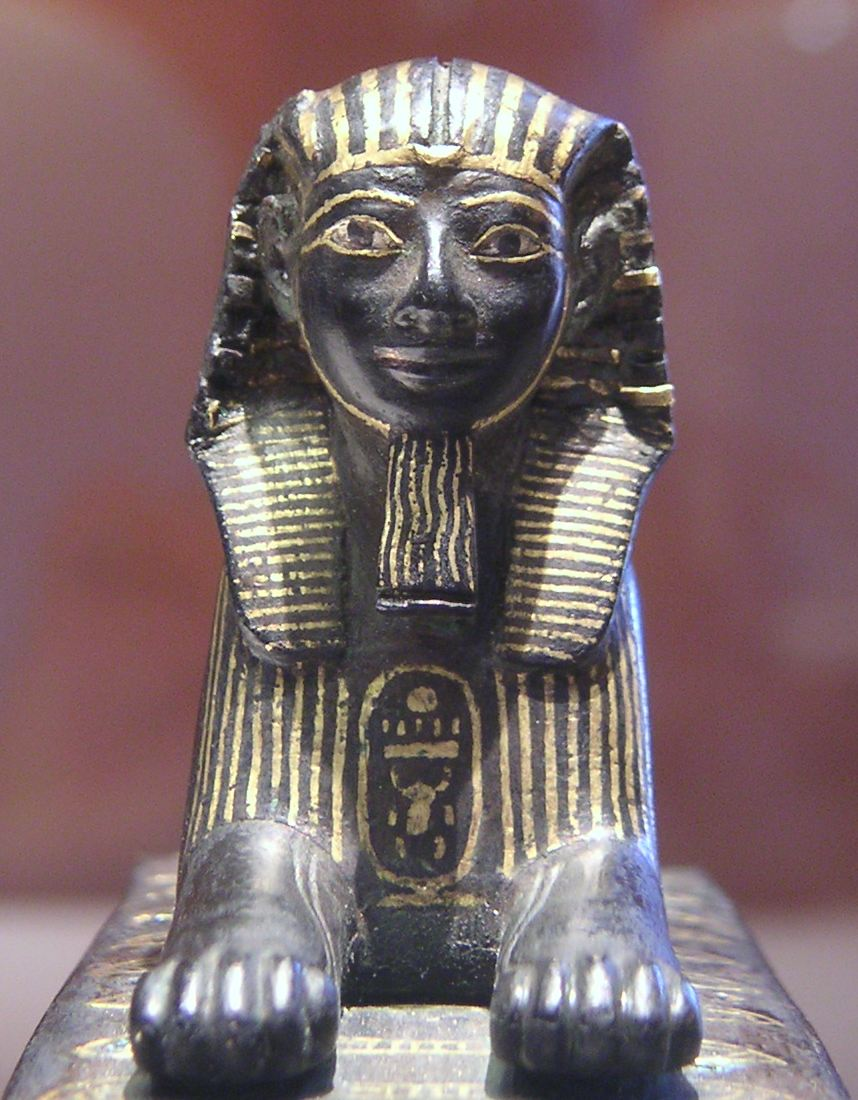
Sphinx-lion of Thutmose III (1479–1425 BC)

In Ancient Egypt, the Bronze Age began in the Protodynastic Period c. 3150 BC. The archaic Early Bronze Age of Egypt, known as the Early Dynastic Period of Egypt, immediately followed the unification of Lower and Upper Egypt, c. 3100 BC. It is generally taken to include the First and Second dynasties, lasting from the Protodynastic Period until c. 2686 BC, or the beginning of the Old Kingdom. With the First Dynasty, the capital moved from Abydos to Memphis with a unified Egypt ruled by an Egyptian god-king. Abydos remained the major holy land in the south. The hallmarks of ancient Egyptian civilization, such as art, architecture and religion, took shape in the Early Dynastic Period. Memphis, in the Early Bronze Age, was the largest city of the time. The Old Kingdom of the regional Bronze Age is the name given to the period in the 3rd millennium BC when Egyptian civilization attained its first continuous peak of complexity and achievement—the first of three "Kingdom" periods which marked the high points of civilization in the lower Nile Valley (the others being the Middle Kingdom and New Kingdom).

The First Intermediate Period of Egypt, often described as a "dark period" in ancient Egyptian history, spanned about 100 years after the end of the Old Kingdom from about 2181 to 2055 BC. Very little monumental evidence survives from this period, especially from the early part of it. The First Intermediate Period was a dynamic time when the rule of Egypt was roughly divided between two areas: Heracleopolis in Lower Egypt and Thebes in Upper Egypt. These two kingdoms eventually came into conflict, and the Theban kings conquered the north, reunifying Egypt under a single ruler during the second part of the Eleventh Dynasty.

==== Nubia ====
The Bronze Age in Nubia started as early as 2300 BC. Egyptians introduced copper smelting to the Nubian city of Meroë in present-day Sudan c. 2600 BC. A furnace for bronze casting found in Kerma has been dated to 2300–1900 BC.

==== Middle Bronze dynasties ====
The Middle Kingdom of Egypt spanned between 2055 and 1650 BC. During this period, the Osiris funerary cult rose to dominate popular Ancient Egyptian religion. The period comprises two phases: the Eleventh Dynasty, which ruled from Thebes, and the Twelfth and Thirteenth dynasties, centred on el-Lisht. The unified kingdom was previously considered to comprise the Eleventh and Twelfth Dynasties, but historians now consider part of the Thirteenth Dynasty to have belonged to the Middle Kingdom.

During the Second Intermediate Period, Ancient Egypt fell into disarray a second time between the end of the Middle Kingdom and the start of the New Kingdom, best known for the Hyksos, whose reign comprised the Fifteenth and Sixteenth dynasties. The Hyksos first appeared in Egypt during the Eleventh Dynasty, began their climb to power in the Thirteenth Dynasty, and emerged from the Second Intermediate Period in control of Avaris and the Nile Delta. By the Fifteenth Dynasty, they ruled lower Egypt. They were expelled at the end of the Seventeenth Dynasty.

==== Late Bronze dynasties ====
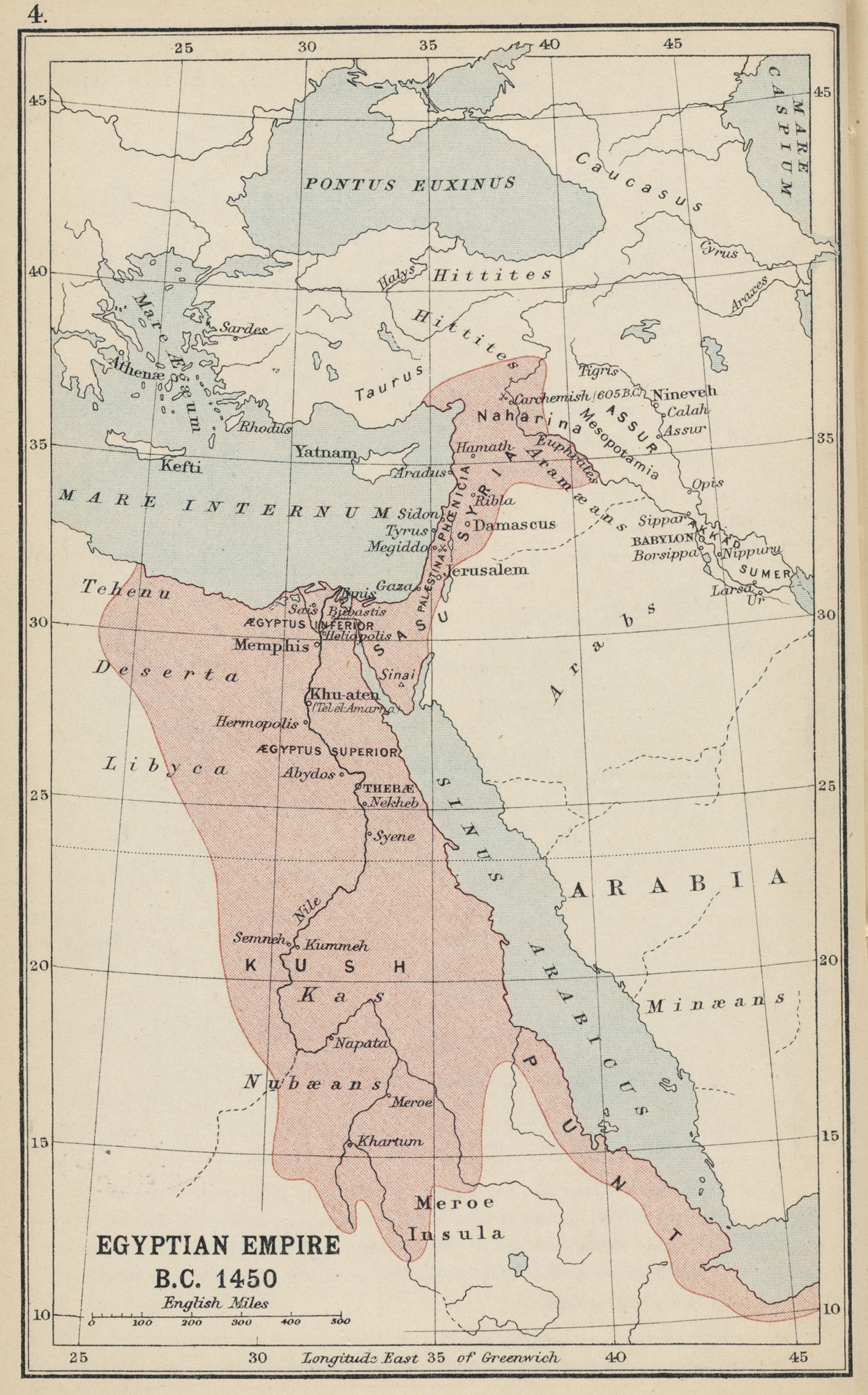
Egyptian Empire at 1450 BC

The New Kingdom of Egypt, also referred to as the Egyptian Empire, existed during the 16th–11th centuries BC. The New Kingdom followed the Second Intermediate Period and was succeeded by the Third Intermediate Period. It was Egypt's most prosperous time and marked the peak of Egypt's power. The later New Kingdom, comprising the Nineteenth and Twentieth dynasties (1292–1069 BC), is also known as the Ramesside period, after the eleven pharaohs who took the name of Ramesses.

=== Iranian plateau ===
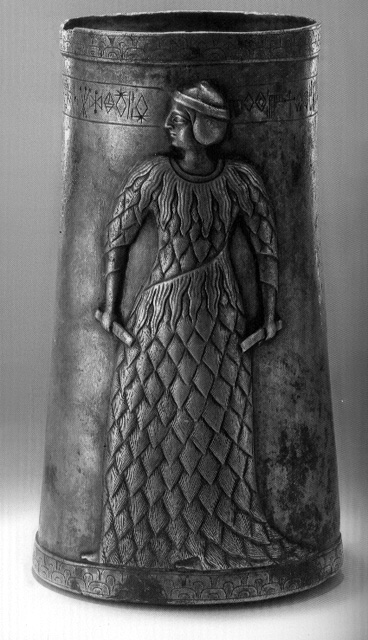
Late 3rd-millennium BC silver cup from Marvdasht, Fars, with linear-Elamite inscription

Elam was a pre-Iranian ancient civilization located east of Mesopotamia. In the Middle Bronze Age, Elam consisted of kingdoms on the Iranian plateau, centred in Anshan. From the mid-2nd millennium BC, Elam was centered in Susa in the Khuzestan lowlands. Its culture played a crucial role in both the Gutian Empire and the Iranian Achaemenid dynasty that succeeded it.

The Oxus civilization was a Bronze Age Central Asian culture dated c. 2300–1700 BC and centred on the upper Amu Darya (a.k.a. the Oxus). In the Early Bronze Age, the culture of the Kopet Dag oases and Altyndepe developed a proto-urban society. This corresponds to level IV at Namazga-Tepe. Altyndepe was a major centre even then. Pottery was wheel-turned. Grapes were grown. The height of this urban development was reached in the Middle Bronze Age c. 2300 BC, corresponding to level V at Namazga-Depe. This Bronze Age culture is called the Bactria–Margiana Archaeological Complex.

The Kulli culture, similar to that of the Indus Valley Civilisation, was located in southern Balochistan (Gedrosia) c. 2500–2000 BC. The economy was agricultural. Dams were found in several places, providing evidence for a highly developed water management system.

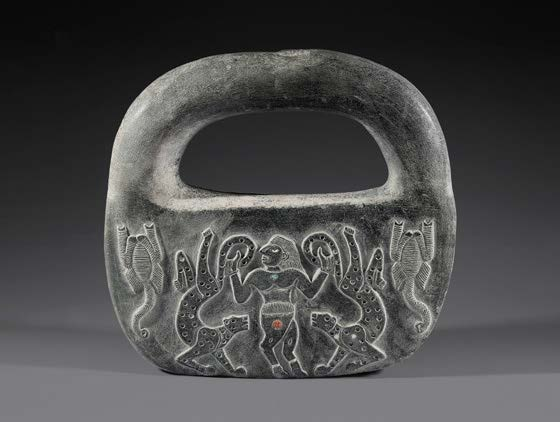
Master of Animals in chlorite, Jiroft culture, c. 2500 BC, Bronze Age I, National Museum of Iran

Konar Sandal is associated with the hypothesized Jiroft culture, a 3rd-millennium BC culture postulated based on a collection of artefacts confiscated in 2001.

=== Levant ===
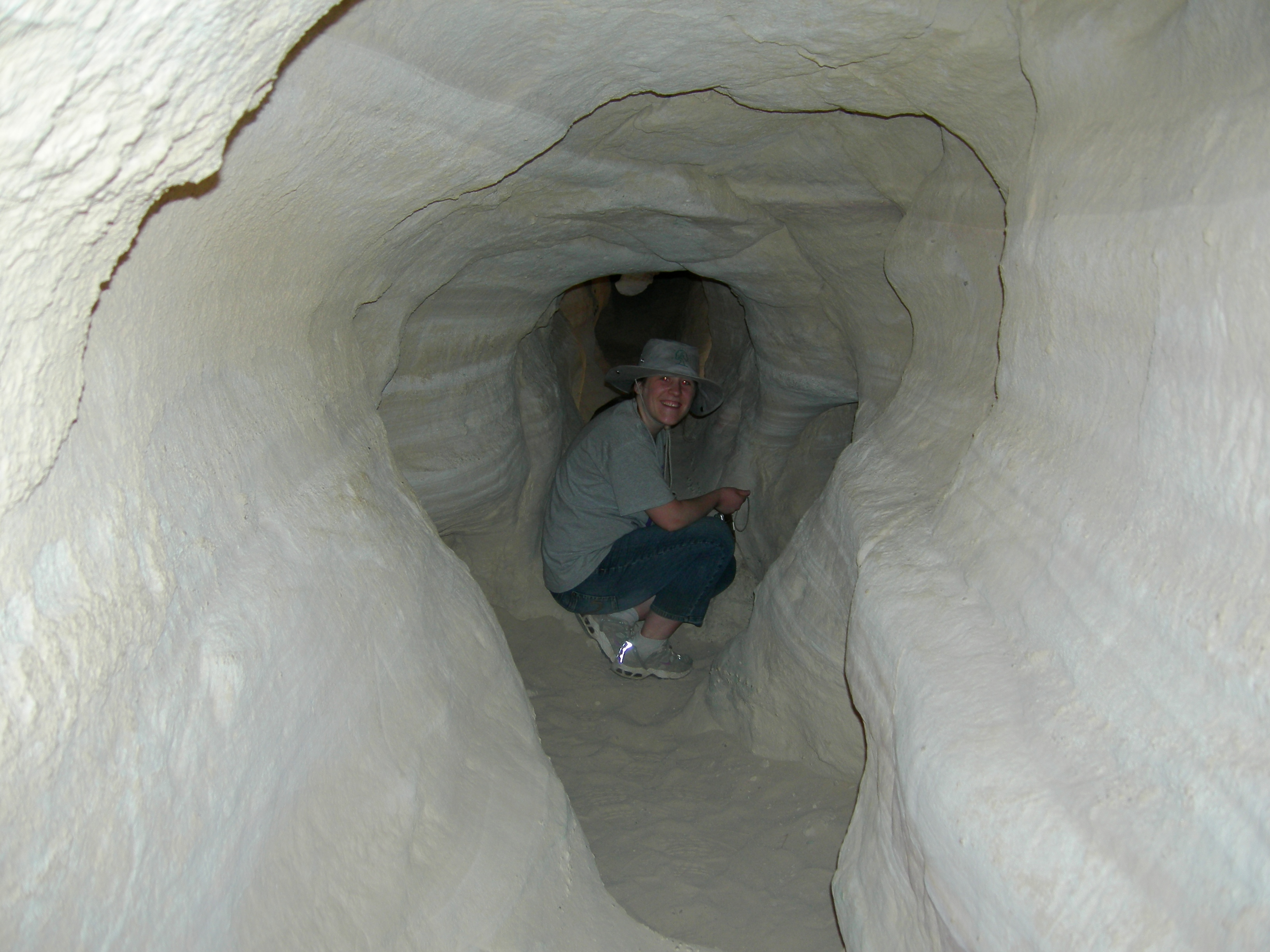
Chalcolithic copper mine in the Timna Valley, Negev Desert, Israel

In modern scholarship, the chronology of the Bronze Age Levant is divided into:

- Early Syrian, or Proto Syrian – corresponding to the Early Bronze Age
- Old Syrian – corresponding to the Middle Bronze Age
- Middle Syrian – corresponding to the Late Bronze Age

The term Neo-Syria is used to designate the early Iron Age.

The old Syrian period was dominated by the Eblaite first kingdom, Nagar and the Mariote second kingdom. The Akkadians conquered large areas of the Levant and were followed by the Amorite kingdoms, c. 2000–1600 BC, which arose in Mari, Yamhad, Qatna, and Assyria. From the 15th century BC onward, the term Amurru is usually applied to the region extending north of Canaan as far as Kadesh on the Orontes River.

The earliest-known contact of Ugarit with Egypt (and the first exact dating of Ugaritic civilisation) comes from a carnelian bead identified with the Middle Kingdom pharaoh Senusret I, whose reign is dated to 1971–1926 BC. A stela and a statuette of the Egyptian pharaohs Senusret III and Amenemhet III have also been found. However, it is unclear when they first arrived at Ugarit. In the Amarna letters, messages from Ugarit c. 1350 BC written by Ammittamru I, Niqmaddu II, and his queen have been discovered. From the 16th to the 13th century BC, Ugarit remained in constant contact with Egypt and Cyprus (Alashiya).

Mitanni was a loosely organised state in northern Syria and south-east Anatolia, emerging c. 1500–1300 BC. Founded by an Indo-Aryan ruling class that governed a predominantly Hurrian population, Mitanni came to be a regional power after the Hittite destruction of Kassite Babylon created a power vacuum in Mesopotamia. At its beginning, Mitanni's major rival was Egypt under the Thutmosids. However, with the ascent of the Hittite empire, Mitanni and Egypt allied to protect their mutual interests from the threat of Hittite domination. At the height of its power during the 14th century BC, Mitanni had outposts centred on its capital, Washukanni, which archaeologists have located on the headwaters of the Khabur River. Eventually, Mitanni succumbed to the Hittites and later Assyrian attacks, eventually being reduced to a province of the Middle Assyrian Empire.

The Israelites were an ancient Semitic-speaking people of the Ancient Near East who inhabited part of Canaan during the tribal and monarchic periods (15th–6th centuries BC), and lived in the region in smaller numbers after the fall of the monarchy. The name "Israel" first appears c. 1209 BC, at the end of the Late Bronze Age and the very beginning of the Iron Age, on the Merneptah Stele raised by the Egyptian pharaoh Merneptah.

The Arameans were a Northwest Semitic semi-nomadic pastoral people who originated in what is now modern Syria (Biblical Aram) during the Late Bronze and early Iron Age. Large groups migrated to Mesopotamia, where they intermingled with the native Akkadian (Assyrian and Babylonian) population. The Aramaeans never had a unified empire; they were divided into independent kingdoms all across the Near East. After the Bronze Age collapse, their political influence was confined to Syro-Hittite states, which were entirely absorbed into the Neo-Assyrian Empire by the 8th century BC.

=== Mesopotamia ===
The Mesopotamian Bronze Age began c. 3500 BC and ended with the Kassite period (c. 1500 – c. 1155 BC). The usual tripartite division into an Early, Middle and Late Bronze Age is not used in the context of Mesopotamia. Instead, a division primarily based on art and historical characteristics is more common.

The cities of the Ancient Near East housed several tens of thousands of people. Ur, Kish, Isin, Larsa, and Nippur in the Middle Bronze Age and Babylon, Calah, and Assur in the Late Bronze Age similarly had large populations. The Akkadian Empire (2335–2154 BC) became the dominant power in the region. After its fall, the Sumerians enjoyed a renaissance with the Ur-based Neo-Sumerian Empire. This was followed by the Isin-Larsa period and then the Kingdom of Upper Mesopotamia ruled by Amorite king Shamshi-Adad I. The earliest mention of Babylon (then a small administrative town) appears on a tablet from the reign of Sargon of Akkad in the 23rd century BC. The Amorite dynasty established the city-state of Babylon in the 19th century BC. Over a century later, it briefly took over the other city-states and formed the short-lived First Babylonian Empire during what is also called the Old Babylonian Period.

Akkad, Assyria, and Babylonia used the written East Semitic Akkadian language for official use and as a spoken language. By that time, the Sumerian language was no longer spoken, but was still in religious use in Assyria and Babylonia, and would remain so until the 1st century AD. The Akkadian and Sumerian traditions played a major role in later Assyrian and Babylonian culture. Despite this, Babylonia, unlike the more militarily powerful Assyria, was founded by non-native Amorites and often ruled by other non-indigenous peoples such as the Kassites, Aramaeans and Chaldeans, as well as by its Assyrian neighbours.

== Asia ==
Political boundaries in 2000 BC

=== Central Asia ===
==== Agropastoralism ====
For many decades, scholars made superficial reference to Central Asia as the "pastoral realm" or alternatively, the "nomadic world", in what researchers call the "Central Asian void": a 5,000-year span that was neglected in studies of the origins of agriculture. Foothill regions and glacial melt streams supported Bronze Age agro-pastoralists who developed complex east–west trade routes between Central Asia and China that introduced wheat and barley to China and millet to Central Asia.

==== Bactria–Margiana Archaeological Complex ====
The Bactria–Margiana Archaeological Complex (BMAC), also known as the Oxus civilisation, was a Bronze Age civilisation in Central Asia, dated c. 2400 – c. 1600 BC, located in present-day northern Afghanistan, eastern Turkmenistan, southern Uzbekistan and western Tajikistan, centred on the upper Amu Darya (Oxus River). Its sites were discovered and named by the Soviet archaeologist Viktor Sarianidi (1976). Bactria was the Greek name for the area of Bactra (modern Balkh), in what is now northern Afghanistan, and Margiana was the Greek name for the Persian satrapy of Marguš, the capital of which was Merv in present-day Turkmenistan.

A wealth of information indicates that the BMAC had close international relations with the Indus Valley, the Iranian plateau, and possibly even indirectly with Mesopotamia. All civilisations were familiar with lost wax casting.

According to a 2019 study, the BMAC was not a primary contributor to later South-Asian genetics.

==== Seima-Turbino phenomenon ====
The natural boundary between Siberia and Mongolia, i.e. the Altai Mountains, has been identified as the point of origin of a cultural enigma termed the Seima-Turbino Phenomenon. It has been conjectured that changes in climate in this region c. 2000 BC triggered a rapid and massive migration westward into northeast Europe, eastward into China, and southward into Vietnam and Thailand across a frontier of some 4,000 mi (6,000 km). Supposedly this migration took place in just five to six generations and enabled people from Finland in the west to Thailand in the east to employ the same metal working technology and in some areas, horse breeding and riding. However, genetic testings of sites in south Siberia and Kazakhstan (Andronovo horizon) would rather support spreading of the bronze technology via Indo-European migrations eastwards, as this technology had been well known for quite a while in western regions.

It is further conjectured that the same migrations spread the Uralic group of languages across Europe and Asia, with extant members of the family including Hungarian, Finnish and Estonian.

=== East Asia ===
==== China ====
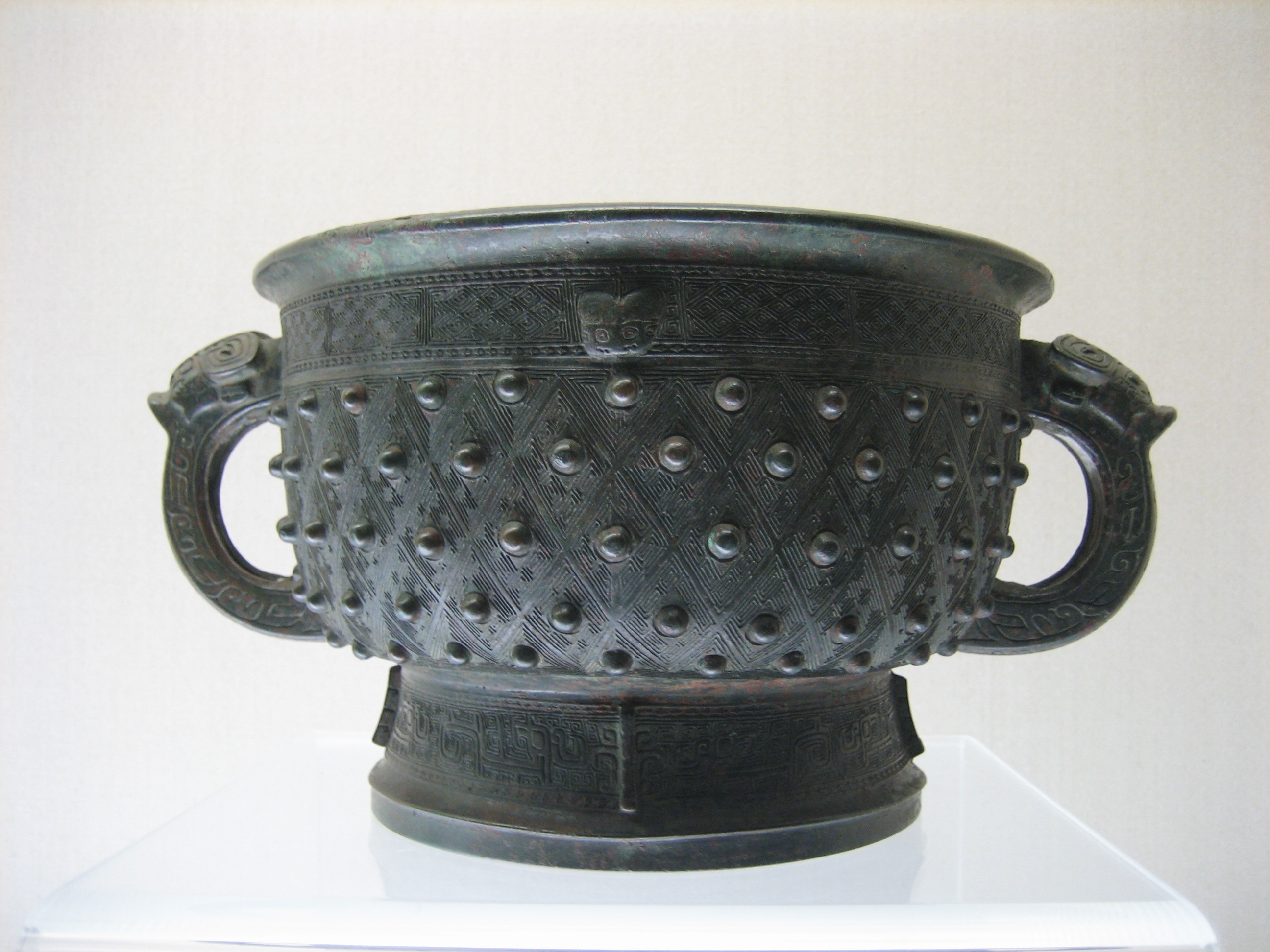
A Shang dynasty two-handled bronze gefuding gui (1600–1046 BC)

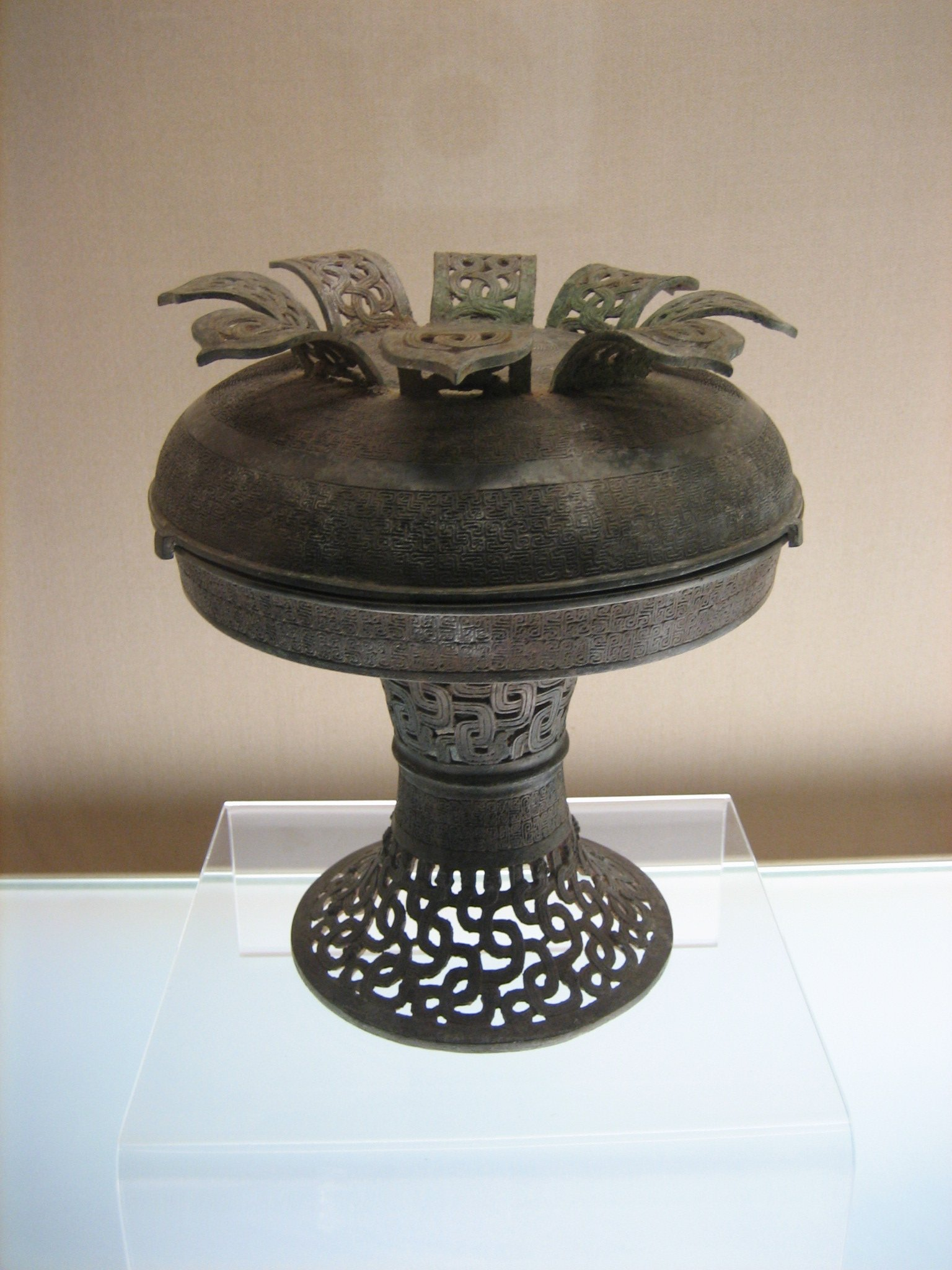
Spring and Autumn period pu bronze vessel with interlaced dragon design (c. 770 – c. 481 BC)

The term "Bronze Age" was adapted to Chinese archaeology from periodization developed in Europe. As a result, there is no universally accepted definition or chronological boundary for the Bronze Age in the context of Chinese prehistory. In fact, there is an argument to be made that the Bronze Age never properly ended in China, as there is no recognized transition to an Iron Age. Together with the jade art that preceded it, bronze continued to be seen as a fine material for ritual art.

A knife from the Majiayao culture found in Linjia, Gansu dated to between 2900 and 2740 BC is earliest copper alloy artifact of 'secure stratigraphic provenience' from China. However, a 2016 journal article concluded from the isotopes, lack of nearby ore deposits, and lack of associated smelting site that the dagger was most likely imported.

By the late third millennium BC established centers of copper and bronze metallurgy had emerged in northwest China associated with the Zongri (2500 BC), Machang (2300 BC) and Qijia (2300 BC) archaeological sites.

While there have been arguments bronze work developed inside of China independent of outside influence the discovery of the Europoid Tarim mummies in Xinjiang has caused archaeologists such as Johan Gunnar Andersson, Jan Romgard, and An Zhimin to suggest a possible route of transmission from the West eastwards. According to An Zhimin, "It can be imagined that initially, bronze and iron technology took its rise in West Asia, first influenced the Xinjiang region, and then reached the Yellow River valley, providing external impetus for the rise of the Shang and Zhou civilizations." According to Jan Romgard, "bronze and iron tools seem to have traveled from west to east as well as the use of wheeled wagons and the domestication of the horse." There are also possible links to Seima-Turbino culture, "a transcultural complex across northern Eurasia", the Eurasian steppe, and the Urals.

The production at Erlitou sitesrepresents the earliest large scale metallurgy in the Central Plains of China. The influence of Seima-Turbino metalworking from the north is supported by recent discoveries in China of perforated spearheads with features that could be associated with the Seima-Turbino visual vocabulary.

Iron use in China dates as early as the 8th century, but remained minimal until the 5th century. Chinese literature authored during the 6th century BC attests to knowledge of iron smelting, yet bronze continues to occupy the seat of significance in the archaeological and historical record for some time after this. W. C. White argues that iron did not supplant bronze, "at any period before the end of the Zhou dynasty (256 BC)", and that bronze vessels make up the majority through the Eastern Han period, i.e. 221 BC.

Chinese bronze artefacts were generally either utilitarian like spear points or adze heads, or "ritual bronzes", which are more elaborate versions made in precious materials. Examples include the numerous sacrificial tripods known as dings. Surviving identified Chinese ritual bronzes tend to be highly decorated, often with the taotie motif, which involves stylised animal faces. These appear in three main motif types: those of demons, symbolic animals, and abstract symbols. Many large bronzes also bear cast inscriptions that are the bulk of the surviving body of early Chinese writing and have helped historians and archaeologists piece together the history of China, especially during the Zhou dynasty.

The bronzes of the Western Zhou document large portions of history not found in the extant texts that were often composed by persons of varying rank and possibly even social class. Further, the medium of cast bronze lends the record they preserve a permanence not enjoyed by manuscripts. These inscriptions can commonly be subdivided into four parts: a reference to the date and place, the naming of the event commemorated, the list of gifts given to the artisan in exchange for the bronze, and a dedication. The relative points of reference these vessels provide have enabled historians to place most of the vessels within a certain time frame of the Western Zhou period, allowing them to trace the evolution of the vessels and the events they record.

==== Japan ====
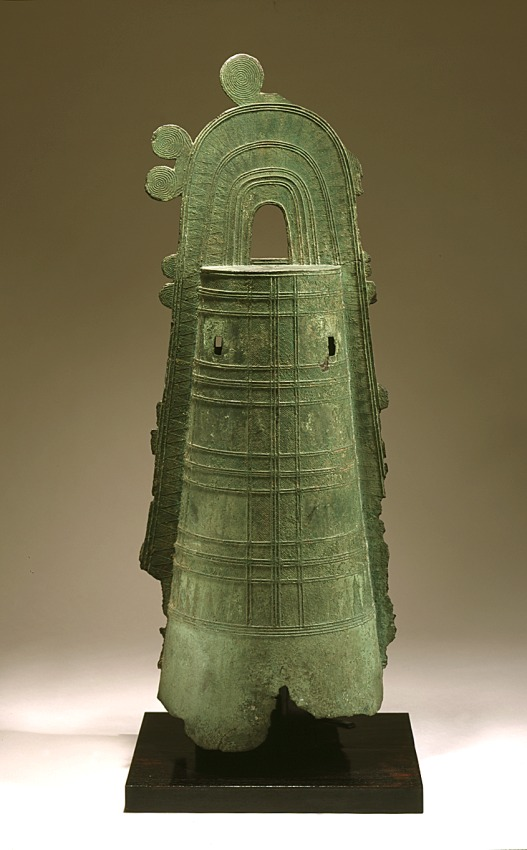
2nd-century BC Yayoi dōtaku bronze bell

The Japanese archipelago saw the introduction of bronze during the early Yayoi period (c. 300 BC), which saw the introduction of metalworking and agricultural practices brought by settlers arriving from the continent. Bronze and iron smelting spread to the Japanese archipelago through contact with other ancient East Asian civilisations, particularly immigration and trade from the ancient Korean peninsula, and ancient mainland China. Iron was mainly used for agricultural and other tools, whereas ritual and ceremonial artefacts were mainly made of bronze. Bronze weapons such as daggers, halberds, and spearheads at first functioned as weapons then later into the Yayoi period evolved into impractical ritual objects.

==== Korea ====
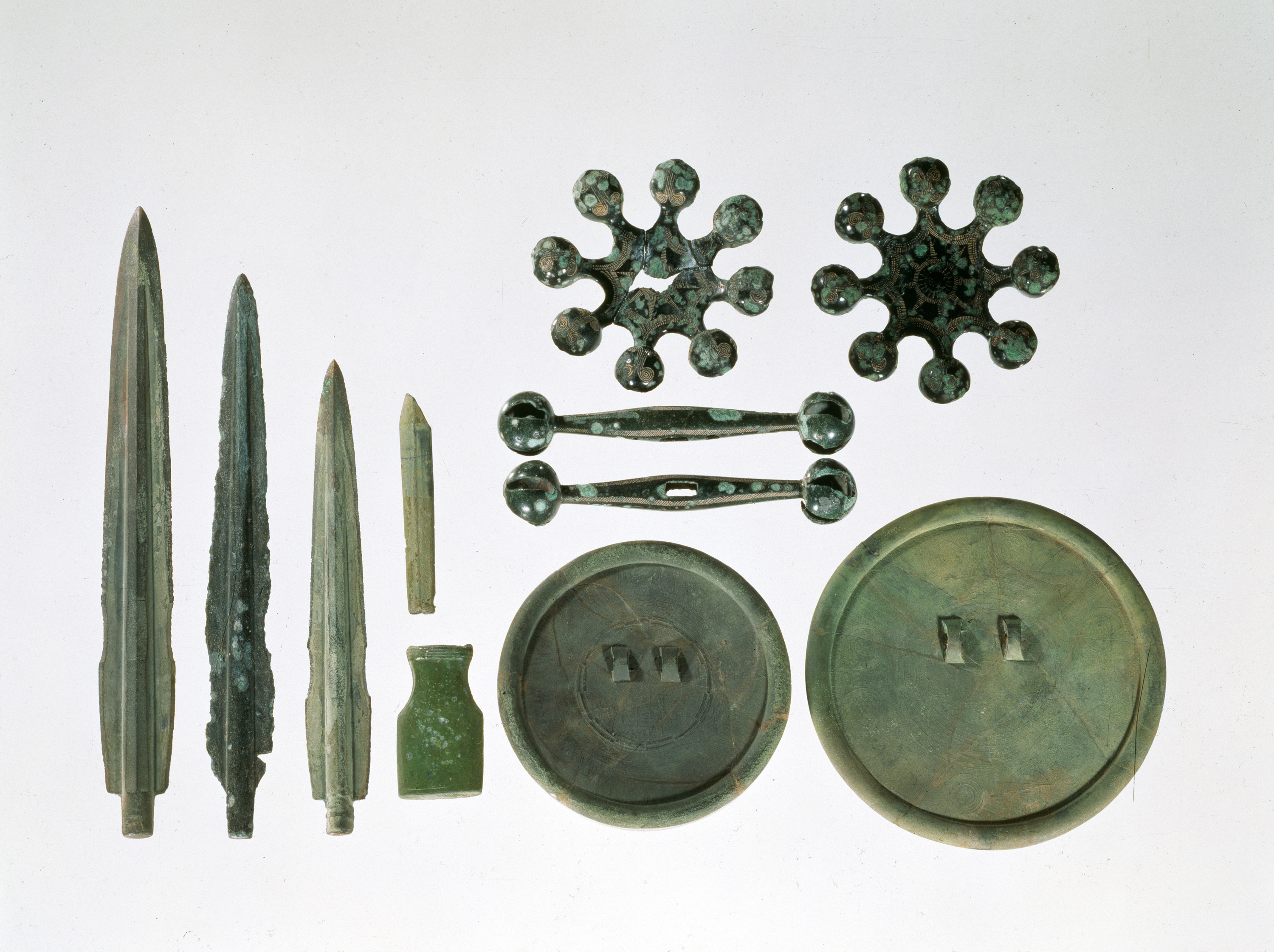
Bronze artefacts from Daegok-ri, Hwasun, Korea

On the Korean Peninsula, the Bronze Age began c. 1000–800 BC. Initially centred around Liaoning and southern Manchuria, Korean Bronze Age culture exhibits unique typology and styles, especially in ritual objects.

The Mumun pottery period is named after the Korean name for undecorated or plain cooking and storage vessels that form a large part of the pottery assemblage over the entire length of the period, but especially between 850 and 550 BC. The Mumun period is known for the origins of intensive agriculture and complex societies in both the Korean Peninsula and the Japanese Archipelago.

The Middle Mumun pottery period culture of the southern Korean Peninsula gradually adopted bronze production (c. 700–600 BC after a period when Liaoning-style bronze daggers and other bronze artefacts were exchanged as far as the interior part of the Southern Peninsula (c. 900–700 BC). The bronze daggers lent prestige and authority to the personages who wielded and were buried with them in high-status megalithic burials at south-coastal centres such as the Igeum-dong site. Bronze was an important element in ceremonies and for mortuary offerings until 100 BC.

=== South Asia ===
(Dates are approximate, consult linked articles for details)

==== Indus Valley ====
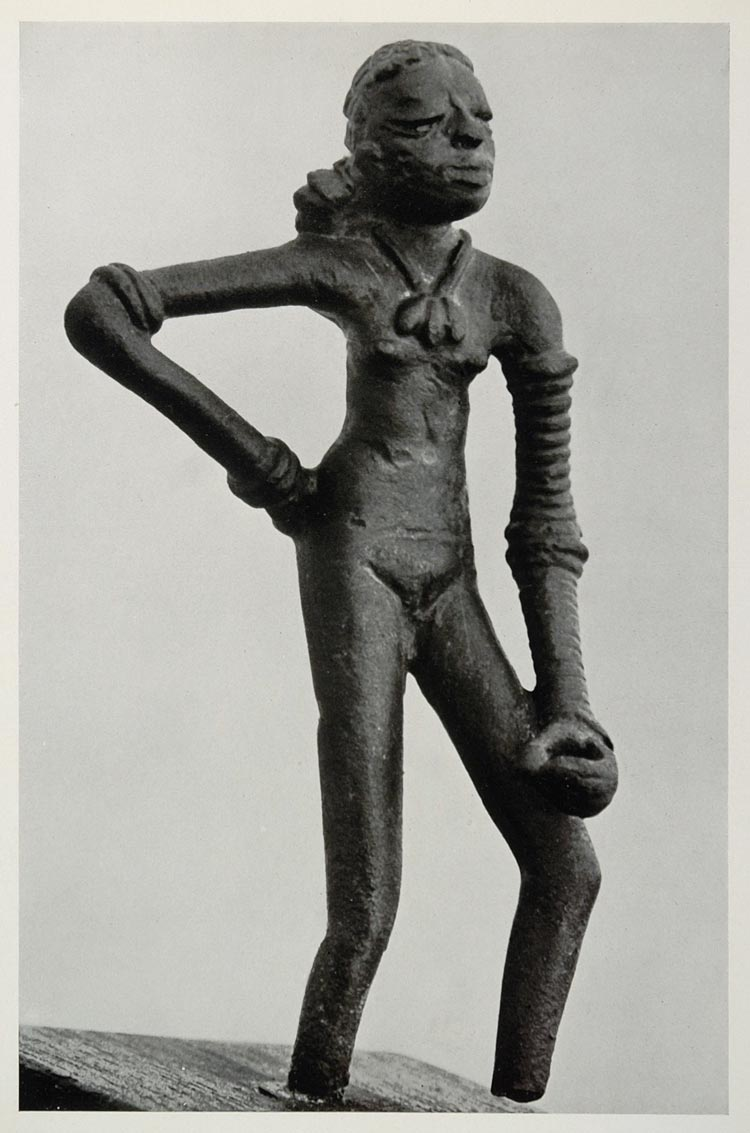
Dancing girl from Mohenjo-daro, c. 2500 BC

A copper amulet manufactured in Mehrgarh in the shape of a wheel spoke, an example of lost-wax casting, has been dated to ca. 4000 BC.

The Bronze Age on the Indian subcontinent began c. 3300 BC with the beginning of the Indus Valley Civilization. Inhabitants of the Indus Valley, the Harappans, developed new techniques in metallurgy and produced copper, bronze, lead, and tin. The Late Harappan culture (1900–1400 BC), overlapped the transition from the Bronze Age to the Iron Age; thus it is difficult to date this transition accurately.

The civilisation's cities were noted for their urban planning, baked brick houses, elaborate drainage systems, water supply systems, clusters of large non-residential buildings, and new techniques in handicraft (carnelian products, seal carving) and metallurgy (copper, bronze, lead, and tin). The large cities of Mohenjo-daro and Harappa likely grew to contain between 30,000 and 60,000 people, and the civilisation during its florescence may have contained between one and five million people.

=== Southeast Asia ===
The Vilabouly Complex in Laos is a significant archaeological site for dating the origin of bronze metallurgy in Southeast Asia.

==== Thailand ====
In Ban Chiang, Thailand, bronze artefacts have been discovered that date to 2100 BC. However, according to the radiocarbon dating on the human and pig bones in Ban Chiang, some scholars propose that the initial Bronze Age in Ban Chiang was in the late 2nd millennium. In Nyaung-gan, Myanmar, bronze tools have been excavated along with ceramics and stone artefacts. Dating is still currently broad (2300–500 BC). Ban Non Wat, excavated by Charles Higham, was a rich site with over 640 graves excavated that gleaned many complex bronze items that may have had social value connected to them.

Ban Chiang, however, is the most thoroughly documented site and has the clearest evidence of metallurgy when in Southeast Asia. With a rough date range from the late 3rd millennium BC to the 1st millennium AD, this site has artefacts such as burial pottery (dated 2100–1700 BC) and fragments of bronze and copper-base bangles. This technology suggested on-site casting from the beginning. The on-site casting supports the theory that bronze was first introduced in Southeast Asia from a different country. Some scholars believe that copper-based metallurgy was disseminated from northwest and central China south and southwest via areas such as Guangdong and Yunnan and finally into southeast Asia c. 1000 BC. Archaeology also suggests that Bronze Age metallurgy may not have been as significant a catalyst in social stratification and warfare in Southeast Asia as in other regions, and that social distribution shifted away from chiefdoms to a heterarchical network. Data analyses of sites such as Ban Lum Khao, Ban Na Di, Non-Nok Tha, Khok Phanom Di, and Nong Nor have consistently led researchers to conclude that there was no entrenched hierarchy.

==== Vietnam ====
Dating to the Neolithic, the first bronze drums, called the Dong Son drums, were uncovered in and around the Red River Delta regions of northern Vietnam and Southern China. These relate to the Dong Son culture of Vietnam.

Archaeological research in Northern Vietnam indicates an increase in rates of infectious disease following the advent of metallurgy; skeletal fragments in sites dating to the early and mid-Bronze Age evidence a greater proportion of lesions than in sites of earlier periods. There are a few possible implications of this. One is the increased contact with bacterial or fungal pathogens due to increased population density and land clearing/cultivation. Another implication is decreased levels of immunocompetence in the Metal Age due to changes in diet caused by agriculture. The last implication is that there may have been an emergence of infectious diseases that evolved into a more virulent form in the metal period.

==== Myanmar ====
The finding of bronze axes at Nyaunggan located in Shwebo township suggests that Bronze Age of Burma began around 1500 BC in parallel with the earlier stages of Southeast Asian bronze production. This period spans from 1500 to 1000 BC during which knowledge of the smelting and casting of copper and tin seems to have spread rapidly along the Neolithic exchange routes.

Another site is the area of Taungthaman, near Irrawaddy River within the walls of the 18th century capital, Amarapura, occupied from the late Neolithic through the early Iron Age, around the middle of the first millennium BC. Small trades and barters, as well as Animism had already begun in this age. The Taungthaman site was discovered in 1971 and bulldozed by the State Administration Council in 2023.

== Europe ==
A few examples of named Bronze Age cultures in Europe roughly in relative order—dates are approximate.

The chosen cultures overlapped in time and the indicated periods do not fully correspond to their estimated extents.

=== Southeast Europe ===
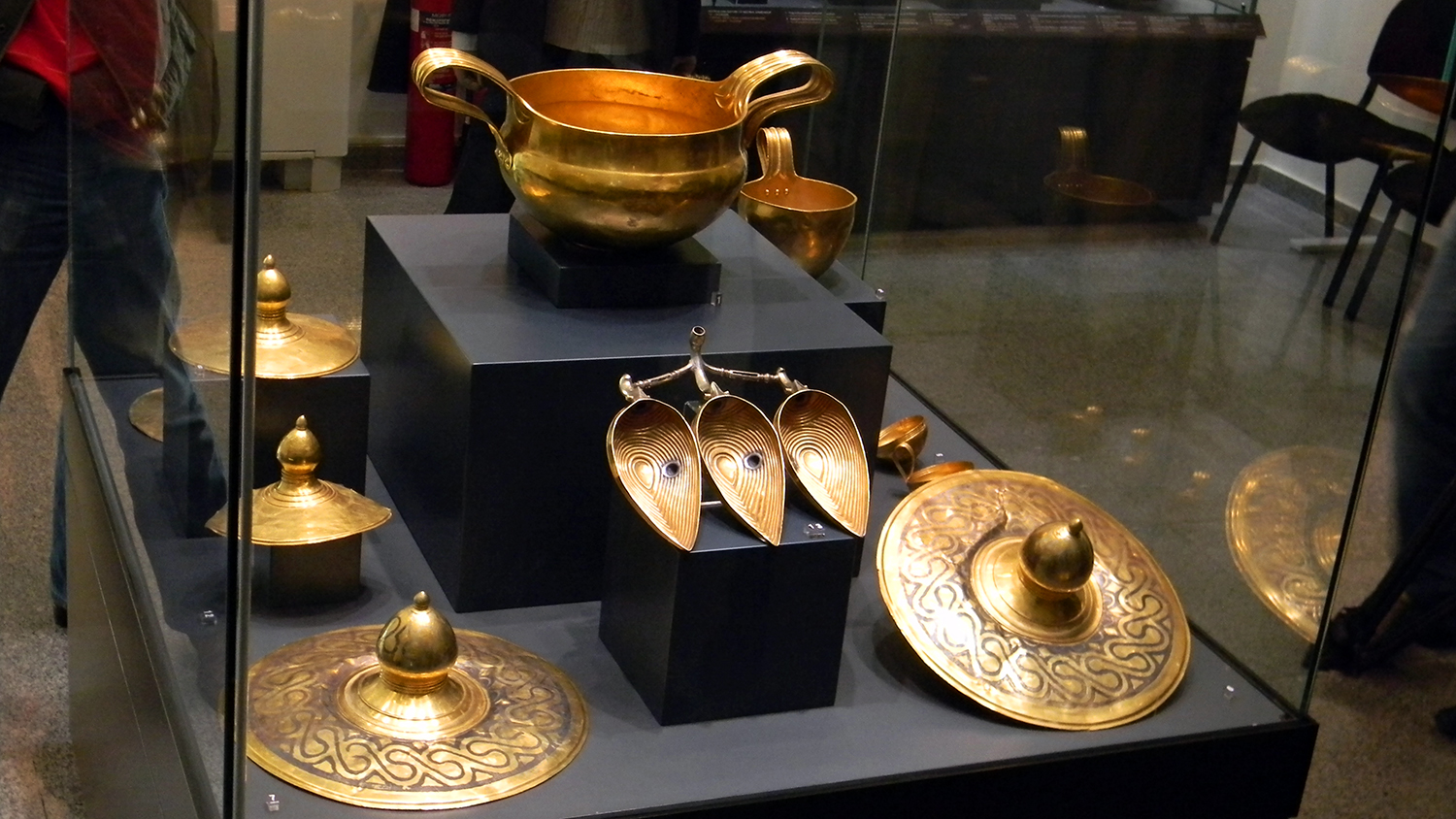
Valchitran Treasure dated 1600–1100 BC, Bulgaria

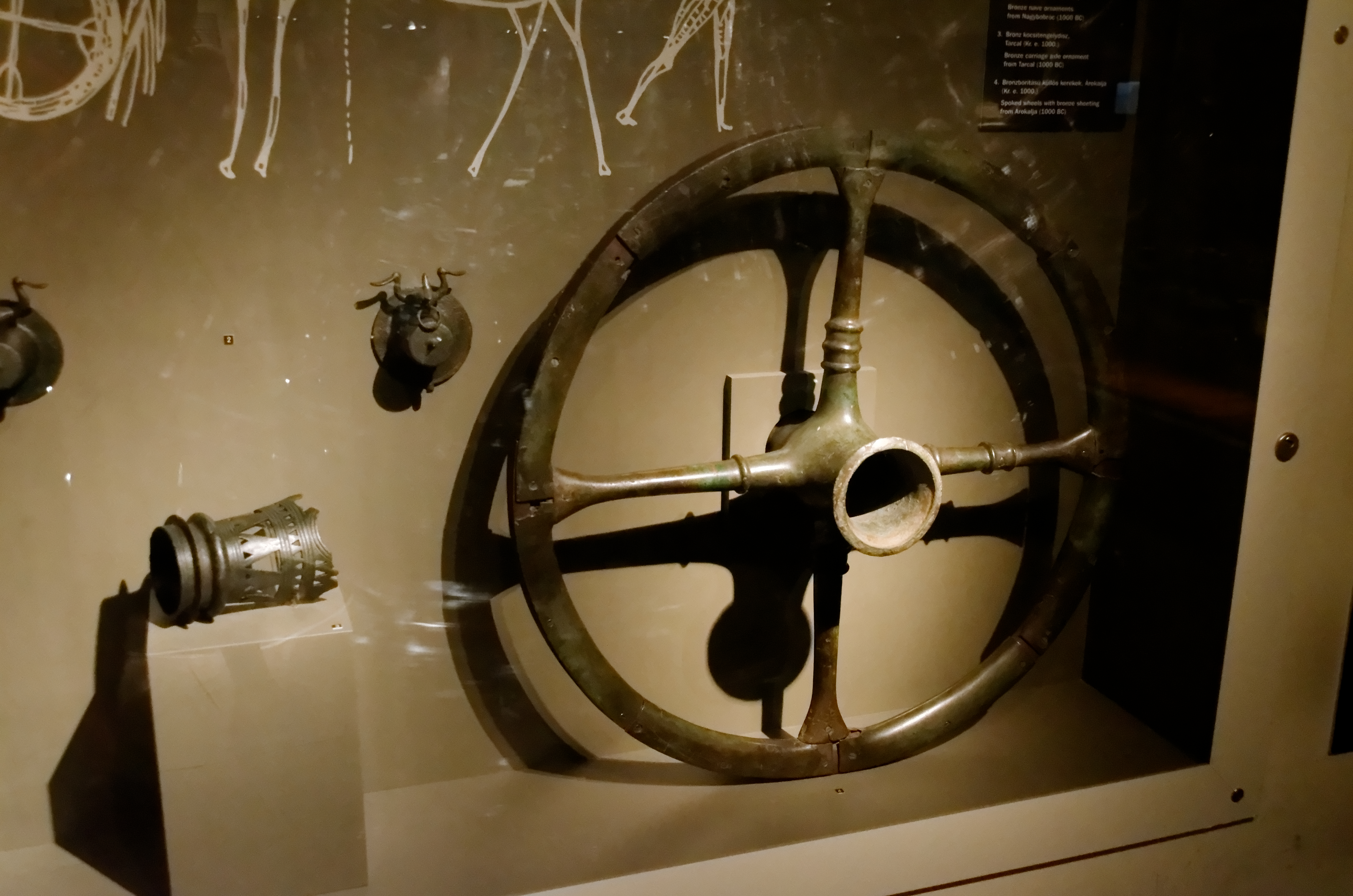
Bronze chariot wheel, Urnfield culture, c. 13th–12th century BC

Radivojevic et al. (2013) reported the discovery of a tin bronze foil from the Pločnik archaeological site dated to c. 4650 BC as well as 14 other artefacts from Serbia and Bulgaria dated before 4000 BC, showing that early tin bronze was more common than previously thought and developed independently in Europe 1500 years before the first tin bronze alloys in the Near East. The production of complex tin bronzes lasted for about 500 years in the Balkans. The authors reported that evidence for the production of such complex bronzes disappears at the end of the 5th millennium BC, coinciding with the "collapse of large cultural complexes in north-eastern Bulgaria and Thrace". Tin bronzes using cassiterite tin were reintroduced to the area some 1500 years later.

The oldest golden artefacts in the world are dated between 4600 and 4200 BC, and were found in the Necropolis of Varna, Bulgaria. These artefacts are on display in the Varna Archaeological Museum.

The Dabene Treasure was unearthed from 2004 to 2007 near Karlovo in central Bulgaria. The treasure consists of 20,000 gold jewellery items from 18 to 23 carats. The most important of them was a dagger made of gold and platinum with an unusual edge. The treasure was dated to the end of the 3rd millennium BC. Scientists suggest that the Karlovo Valley used to be a major crafts centre that exported golden jewellery across Europe. It is considered one of the largest prehistoric golden treasures in the world.

=== Aegean ===
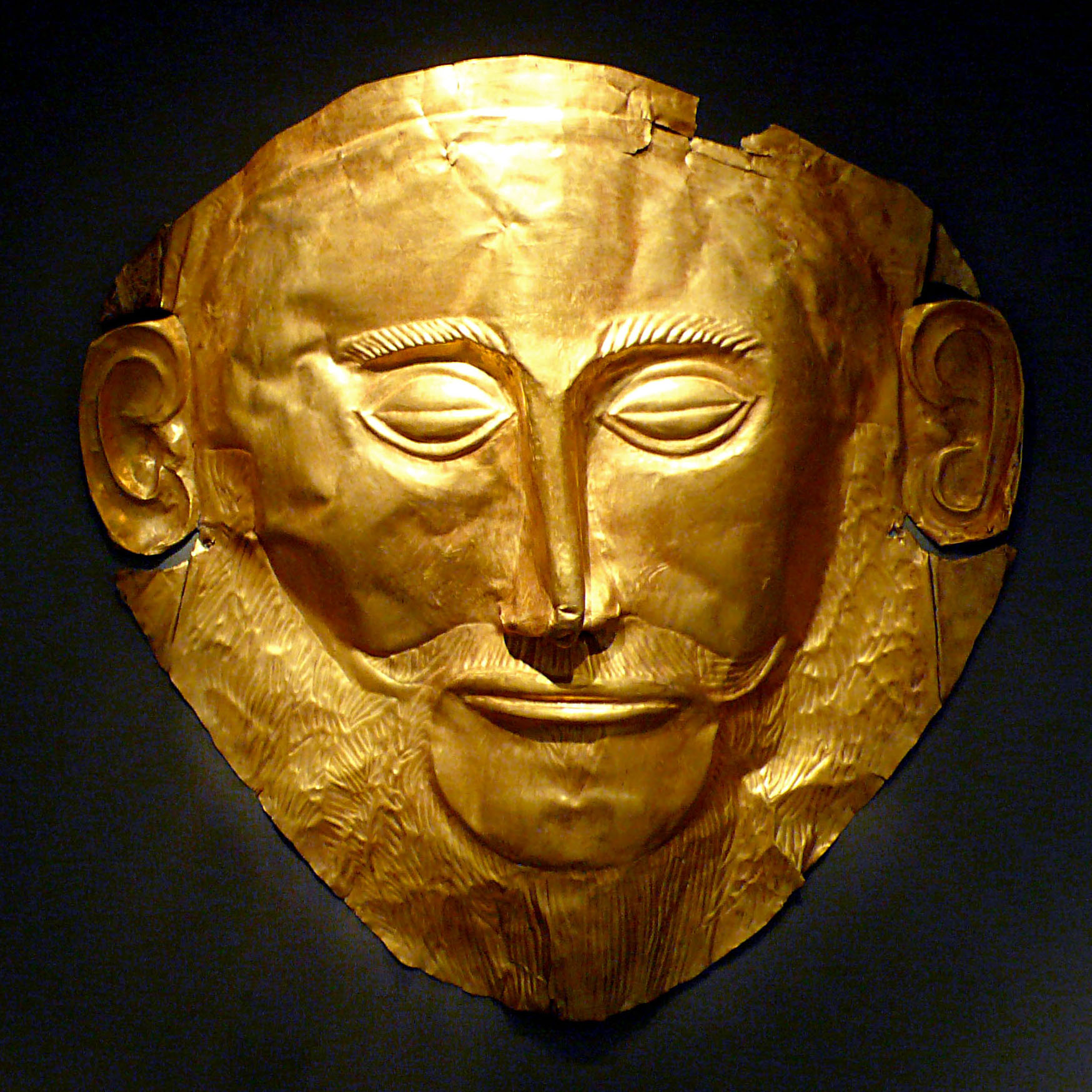
The gold Mask of Agamemnon produced during the Mycenaean civilisation, from Mycenae, Greece, 1550 BC

The Aegean Bronze Age began c. 3200 BC, when civilisations first established a far-ranging trade network. This network imported tin and charcoal to Cyprus, where copper was mined and alloyed with tin to produce bronze. Bronze objects were then exported far and wide. Isotopic analysis of tin in some Mediterranean bronze artefacts suggests that they may have originated from Bronze Age Britain.

Knowledge of navigation was well-developed by this time and reached a peak of skill not exceeded (except perhaps by Polynesian sailors) until 1730 when the invention of the chronometer enabled the precise determination of longitude.

The Minoan civilisation based in Knossos on the island of Crete appears to have coordinated and defended its Bronze Age trade. Ancient empires valued luxury goods in contrast to staple foods, leading to famine.

==== Aegean collapse ====
Invasions, destruction and possible population movements during the collapse of the Bronze Age, c. 1200 BC

Bronze Age collapse theories have described aspects of the end of the Bronze Age in this region. At the end of the Bronze Age in the Aegean region, the Mycenaean administration of the regional trade empire followed the decline of Minoan primacy. Several Minoan client states lost much of their population to famine and pestilence. This would indicate that the trade network may have failed, preventing the trade that would previously have relieved such famines and prevented illness caused by malnutrition. It is also known that in this era, the breadbasket of the Minoan empire—the area north of the Black Sea—also suddenly lost much of its population and thus probably some capacity to cultivate crops. Drought and famine in Anatolia may have also led to the Aegean collapse by disrupting trade networks, therefore preventing the Aegean from accessing bronze and luxury goods.

The Aegean collapse has been attributed to the exhaustion of the Cypriot forests causing the end of the bronze trade. These forests are known to have existed in later times, and experiments have shown that charcoal production on the scale necessary for the bronze production of the late Bronze Age would have exhausted them in less than 50 years.

The Aegean collapse has also been attributed to the fact that as iron tools became more common, the main justification for the tin trade ended, and that trade network ceased to function as it did formerly. The colonies of the Minoan empire then suffered drought, famine, war, or some combination of the three, and had no access to the distant resources of an empire by which they could easily recover.

The Thera eruption occurred c. 1600 BC, 110 km (68 mi) north of Crete. Speculation includes that a tsunami from Thera (more commonly known today as Santorini) destroyed Cretan cities. A tsunami may have destroyed the Cretan navy in its home harbour, which then lost crucial naval battles; so that in the LMIB/LMII event (c. 1450 BC) the cities of Crete burned and the Mycenaean civilisation conquered Knossos. If the eruption occurred in the late 17th century BC as most chronologists believe, then its immediate effects belong to the Middle to Late Bronze Age transition, and not to the end of the Late Bronze Age, but it could have triggered the instability that led to the collapse first of Knossos and then of Bronze Age society overall. One such theory highlights the role of Cretan expertise in administering the empire, post-Thera. If this expertise was concentrated in Crete, then the Mycenaeans may have made political and commercial mistakes in administering the Cretan empire.

Archaeological findings, including some on the island of Thera, suggest that the centre of the Minoan civilisation at the time of the eruption was actually on Thera rather than on Crete. According to this theory, the catastrophic loss of the political, administrative and economic centre due to the eruption, as well as the damage wrought by the tsunami to the coastal towns and villages of Crete, precipitated the decline of the Minoans. A weakened political entity with a reduced economic and military capability and fabled riches would have then been more vulnerable to conquest. Indeed, the Santorini eruption is usually dated to c. 1630 BC, while the Mycenaean Greeks first enter the historical record a few decades later, c. 1600 BC. The later Mycenaean assaults on Crete (c. 1450 BC) and Troy (c. 1250 BC) would have been a continuation of the steady encroachment of the Greeks upon the weakened Minoan world.

=== Central Europe ===
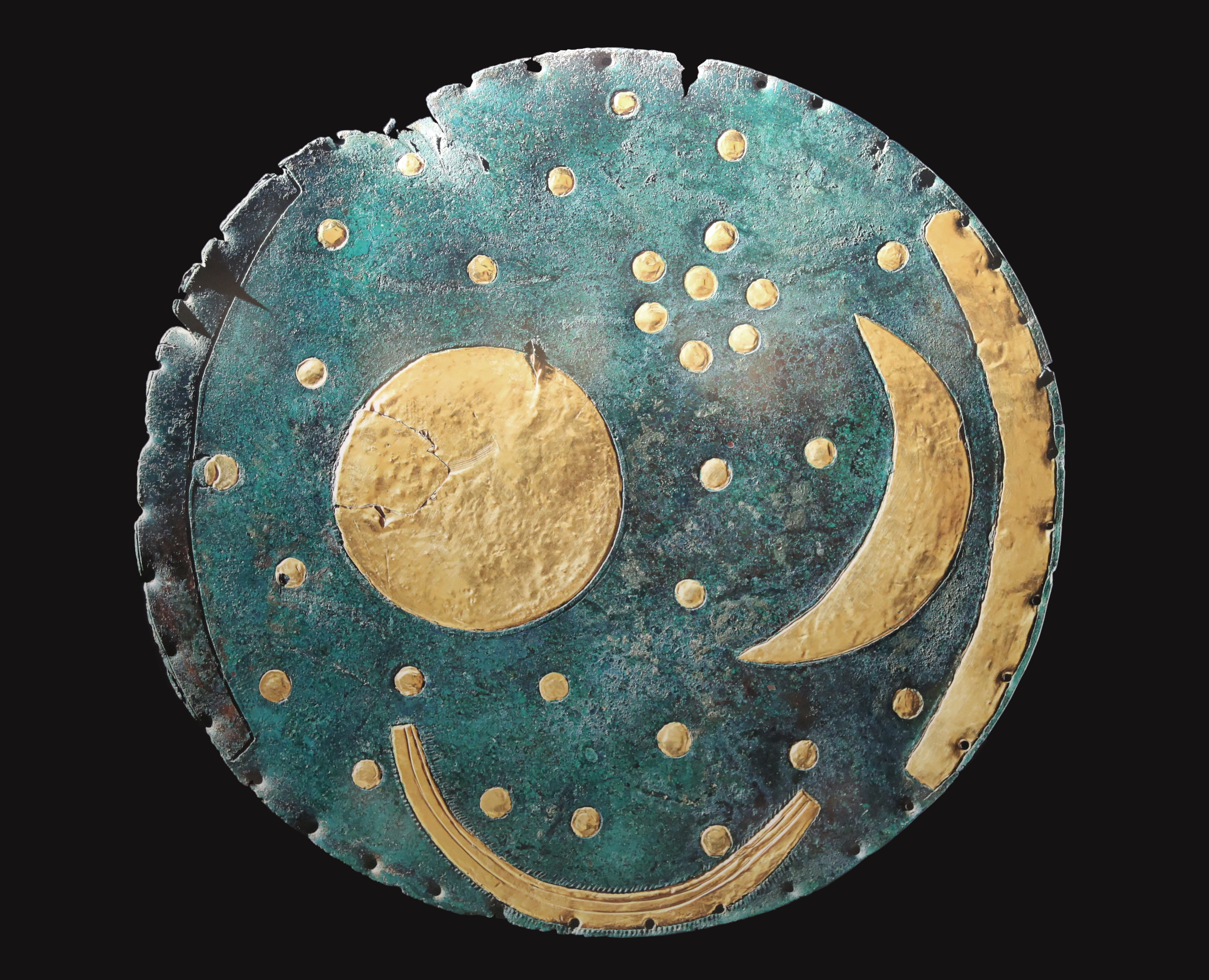
Nebra sky disc from the Aunjetitz culture, present-day Germany (1800–1600 BC)

In Central Europe, the Early Bronze Age Unetice culture (2300–1600 BC) includes numerous smaller groups like the Straubing, Adlerberg and Hatvan cultures. Some very rich burials, such as the one located at Leubingen with grave gifts crafted from gold, point to an increase of social stratification already present in the Unetice culture. Cemeteries of this period are small and rare. The Unetice culture was followed by the Middle Bronze Age (1600–1200 BC) tumulus culture, characterised by inhumation burials in tumuli barrows. In the eastern Hungarian Körös tributaries, the early Bronze Age first saw the introduction of the Mako culture, followed by the Otomani and Gyulavarsand cultures.

The late Bronze Age Urnfield culture (1300–700 BC) was characterised by cremation burials. It included the Lusatian culture in eastern Germany and Poland (1300–500 BC) that continues into the Iron Age. The Central European Bronze Age was followed by the Iron Age Hallstatt culture (700–450 BC). Important sites include Biskupin in Poland, Nebra in Germany, Vráble in Slovakia, and Zug-Sumpf in Switzerland.

German prehistorian Paul Reinecke described Bronze A1 (Bz A1) period (2300–2000 BC: triangular daggers, flat axes, stone wrist-guards, flint arrowheads) and Bronze A2 (Bz A2) period (1950–1700 BC: daggers with metal hilt, flanged axes, halberds, pins with perforated spherical heads, solid bracelets) and phases Hallstatt A and B (Ha A and B).

=== Southern Europe ===
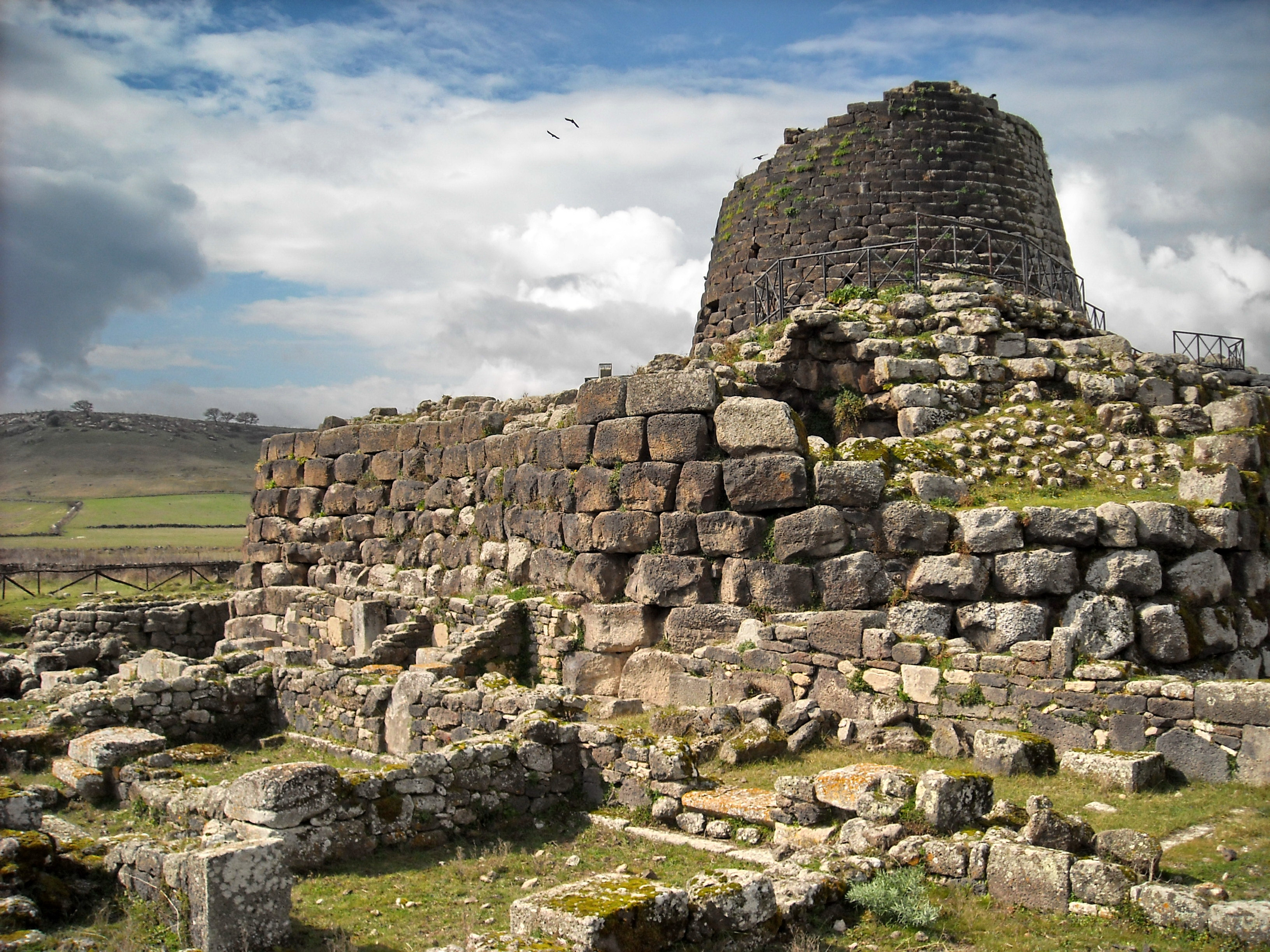
Nuraghe Santu Antine in Torralba, Sardinia, Italy

The Apennine culture was a technology complex in central and southern Italy spanning both the Chalcolithic and Bronze Age proper. The Camuni were an ancient people of uncertain origin who lived in Val Camonica, in present-day Lombardy, during the Iron Age, although groups of hunters, shepherds, and farmers are known to have lived in the area since the Neolithic.

Located in Sardinia and Corsica, the Nuragic civilisation lasted from the early Bronze Age (18th century BC) to the 2nd century AD, when the islands were already Romanised. They take their name from the characteristic Nuragic towers, which evolved from the pre-existing megalithic culture, which built dolmens and menhirs.

The towers are unanimously considered the best-preserved and largest megalithic remains in Europe. Their purpose is still debated: some scholars consider them monumental tombs, others as Houses of the Giants, other as fortresses, ovens for metal fusion, prisons, or finally temples for a solar cult. Near the end of the 3rd millennium BC, Sardinia exported to Sicily a culture that built small dolmens, trilithic or polygonal shaped, that served as tombs, as in the Sicilian dolmen of "Cava dei Servi". From this region, they reached Malta and other countries of Mediterranean basin.

The Terramare was an early Indo-European civilisation in the area of what is now Pianura Padana in northern Italy, before the arrival of the Celts, and in other parts of Europe. They lived in square villages of wooden stilt houses. These villages were built on land, but generally near a stream, with roads forming a grid plan. The whole complex was of the nature of a fortified settlement. The Terramare culture was widespread in the Pianura Padana, especially along the Panaro river, between Modena and Bologna, and in the rest of Europe. The civilisation developed in the Middle and Late Bronze Age during the 17th–13th centuries BC.

The Castellieri culture developed in Istria during the Middle Bronze Age. It lasted for more than a millennium, from the 15th century BC until the Roman conquest in the 3rd century BC. It takes its name from the fortified boroughs (Castellieri, Friulian: cjastelir) that characterised the culture.

The Canegrate culture developed from the mid-Bronze Age (13th century BC) until the Iron Age in the Pianura Padana, in what are now western Lombardy, eastern Piedmont, and Ticino. It takes its name from the township of Canegrate, where, in the 20th century, some fifty tombs with ceramics and metal objects were found. The Canegrate culture migrated from the northwest part of the Alps and descended to Pianura Padana from the Swiss Alps passes and the Ticino.

The Golasecca culture developed starting from the late Bronze Age in the Po plain. It takes its name from Golasecca, a locality next to the Ticino, where in the early 19th century abbot Giovanni Battista Giani excavated its first findings comprising some 50 tombs with ceramics and metal objects. Remains of the Golasecca culture span an area of about 20,000 km^{2} (4,900,000 acres) south to the Alps, between the Po, Sesia, and Serio rivers, dating to the 9th–4th centuries BC.

=== Western Europe ===
==== Great Britain ====
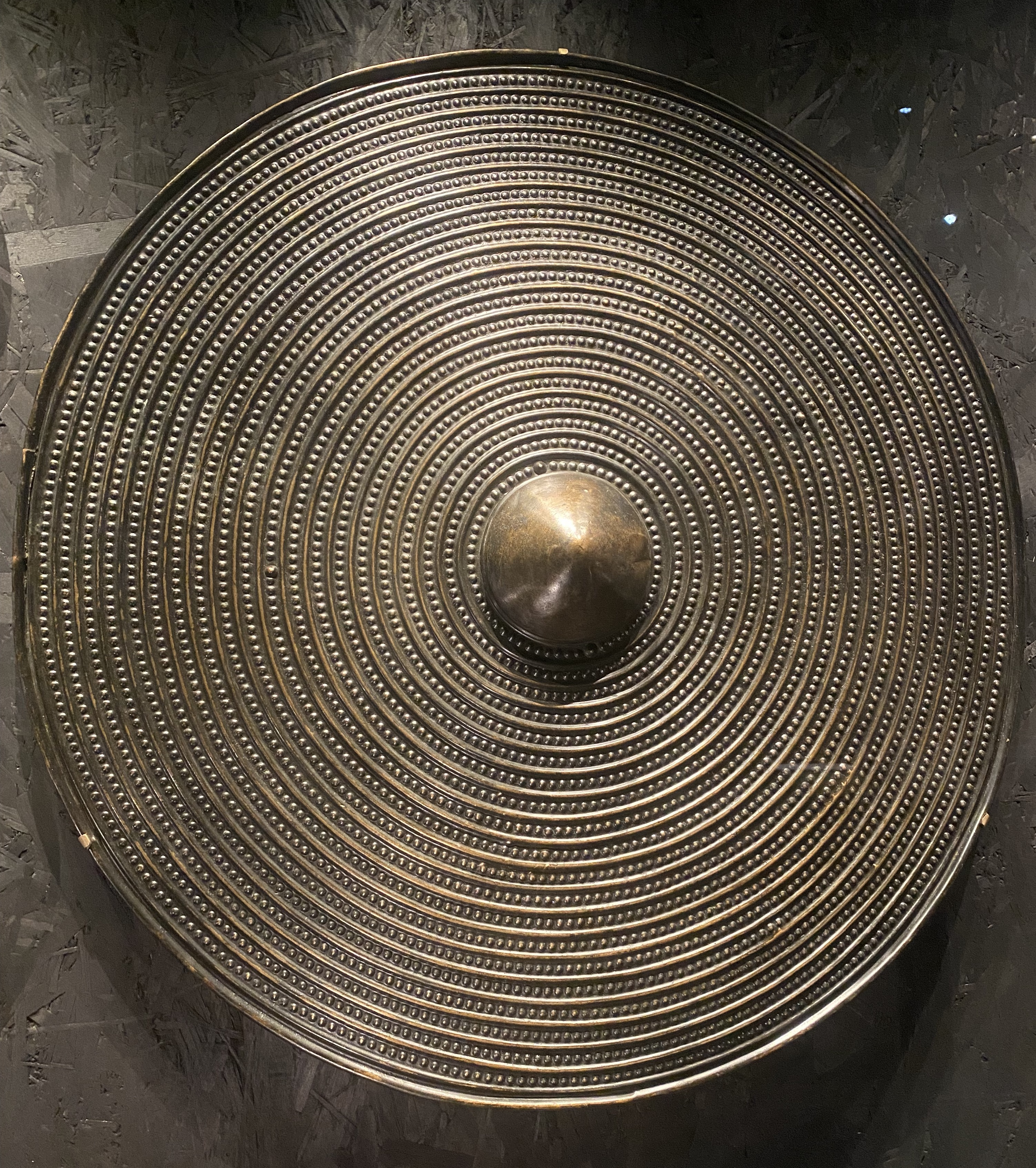
Bronze shield, Bronze Age Britain, 1300–1000 BC

In Great Britain, the Bronze Age is considered to have been the period from c. 2100 to 750 BC. Migration brought new people to the islands from the continent. Tooth enamel isotope research on bodies found in early Bronze Age graves around Stonehenge indicates that at least some of the migrants came from the area of present-day Switzerland. Another example site is Must Farm near Whittlesey, host to the most complete Bronze Age wheel ever to be found. The Beaker culture displayed different behaviours from earlier Neolithic people, and cultural change was significant. Integration is thought to have been peaceful, as many of the early henge sites were seemingly adopted by the newcomers. The rich Wessex culture developed in southern Britain at this time. Additionally, the climate was deteriorating; where once the weather was warm and dry it became much wetter as the Bronze Age continued, forcing the population away from easily defended sites in the hills and into the fertile valleys. Large livestock farms developed in the lowlands and appear to have contributed to economic growth and inspired increasing forest clearances. The Deverel-Rimbury culture began to emerge in the second half of the Middle Bronze Age (c. 1400–1100 BC) to exploit these conditions. Devon and Cornwall were major sources of tin for much of western Europe and copper was extracted from sites such as the Great Orme mine in northern Wales. Social groups appear to have been tribal but with growing complexity and hierarchies becoming apparent.

The burials, which until this period had usually been communal, became more individual. For example, whereas in the Neolithic a large chambered cairn or long barrow housed the dead, Early Bronze Age people buried their dead in individual barrows (commonly known and marked on modern British Ordnance Survey maps as tumuli), or sometimes in cists covered with cairns.

The greatest quantities of bronze objects in England were discovered in East Cambridgeshire, with the most important finds being the 6,500-piece Isleham Hoard. Alloying of copper with tin to make bronze was practised soon after the discovery of copper. The techniques needed to deliberately alloy copper with zinc to form brass first arrived in Great Britain late in the first millennium BC. One copper mine at Great Orme in North Wales, reached a depth of 70 metres. At Alderley Edge in Cheshire, carbon dating has established mining at around 2280 to 1890 BC with a 95% probability. The earliest identified metalworking site (Sigwells, Somerset) came much later, dated by globular urn-style pottery to c. the 12th century BC. The identifiable sherds from over 500 mould fragments included a perfect fit of the hilt of a sword in the Wilburton style held in Somerset County Museum.

==== Atlantic Bronze Age ====
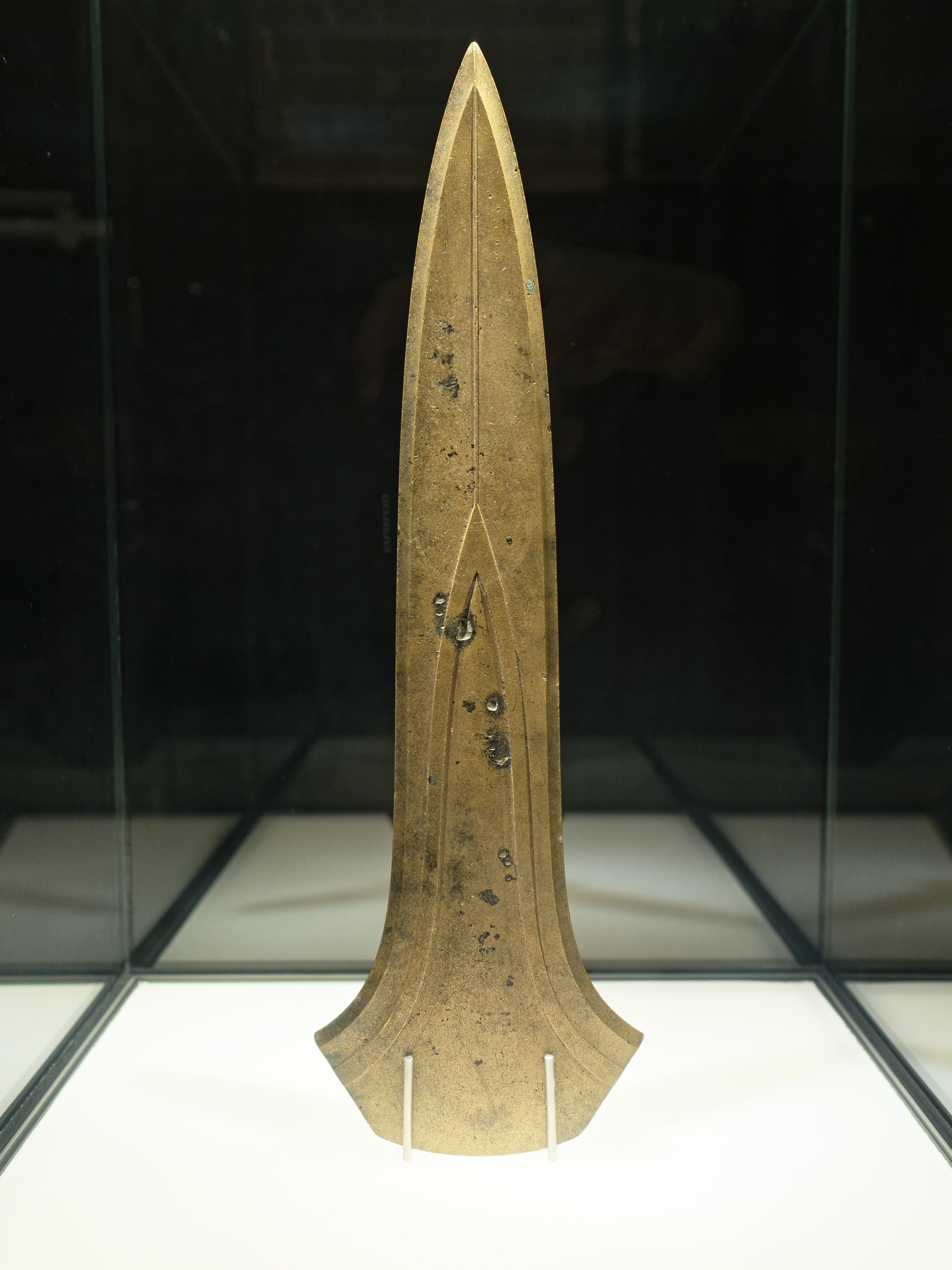
The Sword of Jutphaas, Hilversum culture, Netherlands, c. 1500 BC

The Atlantic Bronze Age as cultural geographic region is a cultural complex (c. 2100 – c. / 800 / 700 cal. BC) that includes different cultures in the context of the Atlantic Iberian Peninsula (Portugal, Andalucía, Galicia, Asturias, Cantabria, País Vasco, Navarra and Castilla and León), the Atlantic France, Britain and Ireland, while the Atlantic Bronze Age as cultural complex of the final phase of the Bronze Age period is dated between c. 1350 and 700 BC. It is marked by economic and cultural exchange. Commercial contacts extend to Denmark and the Mediterranean. The Atlantic Bronze Age was defined by many distinct regional centres of metal production, unified by a regular maritime exchange of products.

==== Ireland ====
The Bronze Age in Ireland began c. 2000 BC when copper was alloyed with tin and used to manufacture Ballybeg type flat axes and associated metalwork. The preceding period is known as the Copper Age and is characterised by the production of flat axes, daggers, halberds and awls in copper. The period is divided into three phases: Early Bronze Age (2000–1500 BC), Middle Bronze Age (1500–1200 BC), and Late Bronze Age (1200 – c. 500 BC). Ireland is known for a relatively large number of Early Bronze Age burials. The country's stone circles and stone rows were built during this period.

=== Northern Europe ===
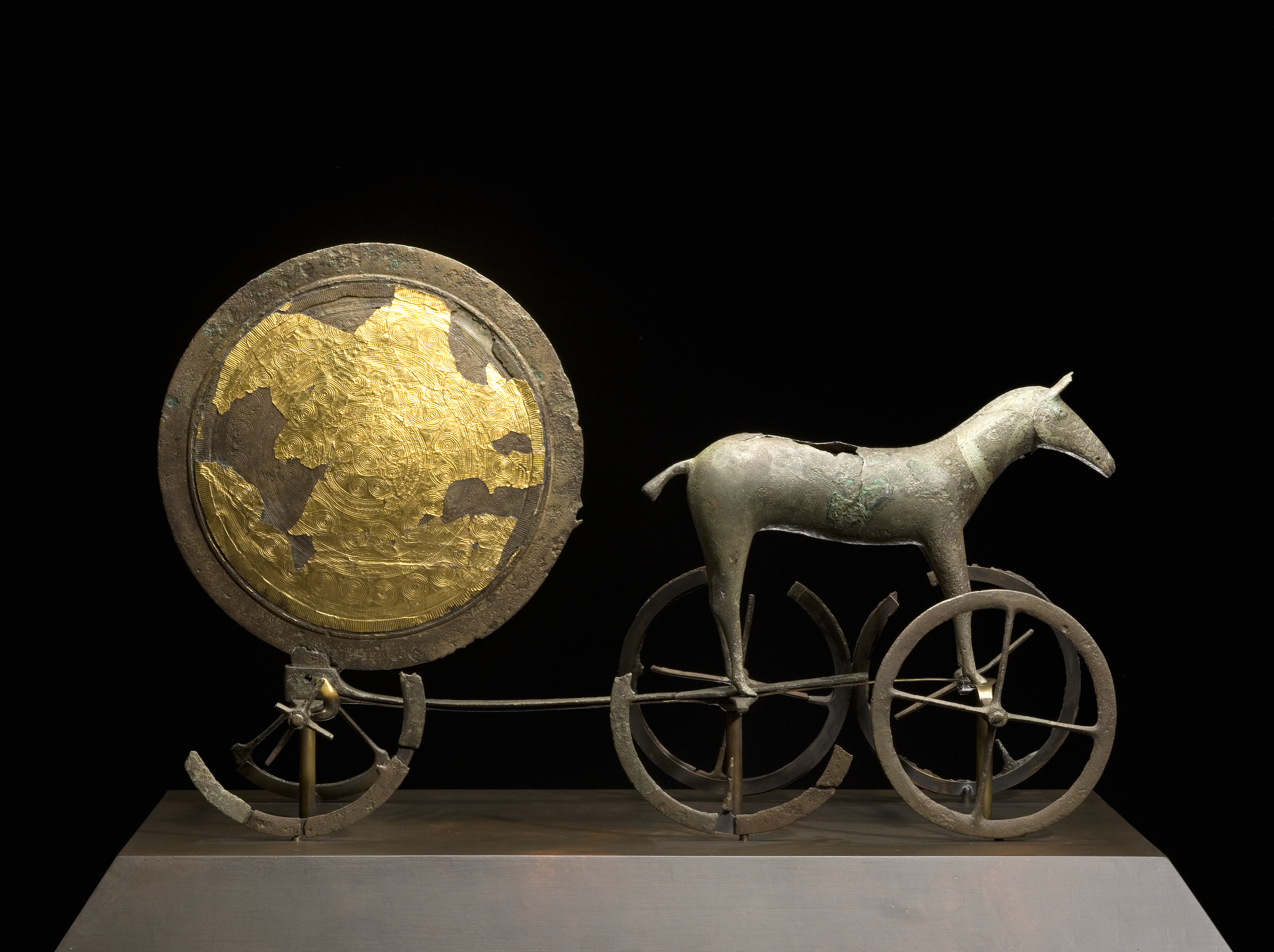
Trundholm sun chariot, Denmark, c. 1500 BC

The Bronze Age in Northern Europe spans the 2nd millennium BC, (Unetice culture, Urnfield culture, Tumulus culture, Terramare culture and Lusatian culture) lasting until c. 600 BC. The Northern Bronze Age was both a period and a Bronze Age culture in Scandinavian pre-history, c. 1700–500 BC, with sites as far east as Estonia. Succeeding the Late Neolithic culture, its ethnic and linguistic affinities are unknown in the absence of written sources. It was followed by the Pre-Roman Iron Age.

Even though Northern European Bronze Age cultures came relatively late, and came into existence via trade, sites present rich and well-preserved objects made of wool, wood and imported Central European bronze and gold. Many rock carvings depict ships, and the large stone burial monuments known as stone ships suggest that shipping played an important role. Thousands of rock carvings depict ships, most probably representing sewn plank-built canoes for warfare, fishing, and trade. These may have a history as far back as the neolithic period and continue into the Pre-Roman Iron Age, as shown by the Hjortspring boat. There are many mounds and rock carving sites from the period. Numerous artefacts of bronze and gold are found. No written language existed in the Nordic countries during the Bronze Age. The rock carvings have been dated through comparison with depicted artefacts.

=== Eastern Europe ===
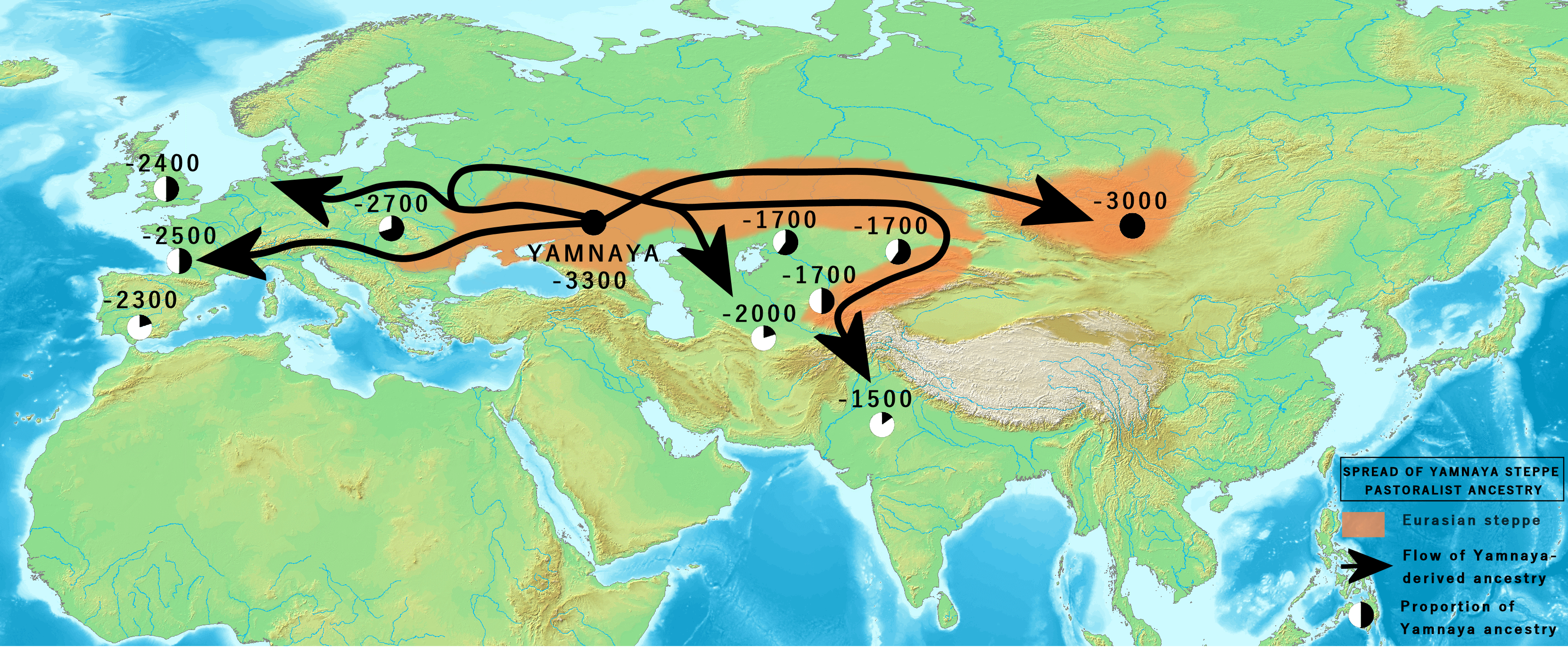
Bronze Age spread of Yamnaya steppe pastoralist ancestry into two subcontinents—Europe and South Asia, and location of the Afanasievo culture, which has the same genetic characteristics as the Yamnayas.

The Yamnaya culture (c. 3300–2600 BC) was a Late Copper Age/Early Bronze Age culture of the Pontic-Caspian steppe associated with early Indo-Europeans. It was followed on the steppe by the Catacomb culture (c. 2800–2200 BC) and the Poltavka culture (c. 2800–2200 BC). The closely related Corded Ware culture in the forest-steppe region to the north (c. 3000–2350 BC) spread eastwards with the Fatyanovo culture (c. 2900–2050 BC), which subsequently developed into the Abashevo culture (c. 2200–1850 BC) and the Sintashta culture (c. 2200–1750 BC). The earliest known chariots have been found in Sintashta burials and there is earlier evidence for chariot use in the Abashevo culture. The Sintashta culture expanded further eastwards into central Asia becoming the Andronovo culture, while the Srubnaya culture (c. 1900–1200 BC) continued the use of chariots in eastern Europe.

=== Caucasus ===
Arsenical bronze artefacts of the Maykop culture in the North Caucasus have been dated to around the 4th millennium BC. This innovation resulted in the circulation of arsenical bronze technology through southern and eastern Europe.

== Africa ==
=== Sub-Saharan Africa ===
Iron and copper smelting appeared around the same time in most parts of Africa. As such, most Classical African civilisations outside Egypt did not experience a distinct Bronze Age. Evidence for iron smelting appears earlier or at the same time as copper smelting in Nigeria c. 900–800 BC, Rwanda and Burundi c. 700–500 BC and Tanzania c. 300 BC.

There is a longstanding debate about whether copper and iron metallurgy were independently developed in sub-Saharan Africa or introduced from the outside across the Sahara from North Africa or the Indian Ocean. Evidence for theories of independent development and outside introduction are scarce and the subject of active scholarly debate. Scholars have suggested that both the relative dearth of archaeological research in sub-Saharan Africa as well as long-standing prejudices have limited or biased our understanding of pre-historic metallurgy on the continent. One scholar characterised the state of historical knowledge: "To say that the history of metallurgy in sub-Saharan Africa is complicated is perhaps an understatement."

=== West Africa ===
Copper smelting took place in West Africa prior to the appearance of iron smelting in the region. Evidence for copper smelting furnaces was found near Agadez, Niger that has been dated as early as 2200 BC. However, evidence for copper production in this region before 1000 BC is debated. Evidence of copper mining and smelting has been found at Akjoujt, Mauretania, that suggests small-scale production c. 800–400 BC.

== Americas ==
The Moche culture of South America independently discovered and developed bronze smelting. Bronze technology was developed further by the Inca and used for utilitarian objects and sculpture. A later appearance of limited bronze smelting in western Mexico suggests either contact of that region with Andean civilisations or separate discovery of the technology. The Calchaquí people of northwestern Argentina had bronze technology.

== Trade ==
Trade and industry played a major role in the development of Bronze Age civilisations. With artefacts of the Indus Valley Civilisation found in ancient Mesopotamia and Egypt, it is clear that these civilisations were not only in touch with one another, but also trading. Early long-distance trade was limited almost exclusively to luxury goods like spices, textiles, and precious metals. Not only did this make cities with ample amounts of these products rich, but it also led to an intermingling of cultures for the first time in history.

Trade routes were not just on land. The first and most extensive trade routes were along rivers such as the Nile, the Tigris, and the Euphrates, which led to the growth of cities on the banks of these rivers. The later domestication of camels also helped encourage trade routes overland, linking the Indus Valley with the Mediterranean. This further led to towns appearing where there was an inn or port where caravan routes ended.

== See also ==
- Hillfort
- Middle Bronze Age migrations (ancient Near East)
- Oxhide ingot
- Timeline of human evolution
