= Arhalba =

King of Ugarit

Ar-Halba (Akkadian: 𒅈𒄬𒉺 Arḫalbá, 𒋧𒄬𒁀 Ariḫalba) was a King of Ugarit, an Ancient Syrian city state in northwestern Syria.

== Reign ==
He was the (son and) successor of Niqmaddu II. He reigning for no less than two years, possibly from 1315 to 1313 BC. He was a vassal of Mursili II of Hatti.

=== Legal texts ===
Very little is known about his short reign, as he is only mentioned in six juridical texts. The one that gives the most information about him is his 'Last will', where he warns his brothers not to marry his wife Kubaba after his death, contrary to the levirate custom. The intriguing letter gave room to plenty of speculation about him, with his non-Semitic name that stands out amongst all Ugaritan kings further enhancing the mystery, with some even suggesting that he was not the legitimate heir to the throne.

In Tablet 16.144 King Arhalbu forbade anyone who succeeded him to marry his widow, by taking her away from his brother, who was to wed her according to levirate custom.

=== Succession ===
Later on, he was supposedly forced by the Hittite king Mursili II to abdicate the throne, in favour of his brother, Niqmepa. He was probably sent to exile afterwards.

== Bibliography ==
- GORDON, C. H. (1956). OBSERVATIONS ON THE AKKADIAN TABLETS FROM UGARIT. Revue d’Assyriologie et d’archéologie Orientale, 50(3), 127–133. http://www.jstor.org/stable/23295232

Preceded by Niqmaddu II	King of Ugarit	Succeeded by Niqmepa
