= Itur-Addu of Alalakh (Mukish) =

King of Alalakh

Itur-Addu
- King of Alalakh
- Reign: c. 1350 BCE.

Itur-Addu was the King of Mukish (c. 1350 BC) centered on its capital city of Alalakh on the Amuq Plain. He became a vassal of Suppiluliuma I of Hatti, but rebelled along with Addu-Nerari of Nuhasse and Aki-Tessup of Nija, trying to press Niqmaddu II of Ugarit to join. The rebellion failed.

== Reign ==
Itur-Addu was a petty king controlling Alalakh on the Amuq Plain in Hatay Province, Turkey. It is unclear if Itur-Addu descended from the Idrimi Dynasty. He is the last known king of Mukish whose territory was reduced. Some decades later it was the "citizens of Alalakh" that represented the city interests. Regional power had also moved to Aleppo.

Political situation. The region was originally under Tushratta of Mitanni. Around 1350-1345 BCE, Suppiluliuma I of Hatti attacked Tushratta and gained control over most of the territory west of the Euphrates.

Rebellion. Eventually, several rulers would try to rebel against Suppiluliuma I as their overlord, a rebellion that failed. Thus Itur-Addu was caught in the struggles between the great kings of the Mitanni and Hatti.

Aftermath. After the rebellion, the Hittites occupied Alalakh. Itur-Addu disappears from history and Alalakh declines as power eventually was moved to the Viceroy of Aleppo. Niqmaddu II of Ugarit was also rewarded being given cities in the borderline with Alalakh. Under Mursili II (c. 1321-1300 BCE) the citizens of Alalakh brought a lawsuit against Niqmepa, son of Niqmaddu II in an attempt to get the cities back. The citizens of Alalakh and not a king bringing the lawsuit forward indicates it no longer had a king.

== Attestations ==
=== Rebellion ===
As Suppiluliuma I gained overlordship of northern Syria, several rulers tried to rebel. The event is referred to in several letters. In Egypt, references are also made to the Hittites entering northern Syria. However, no letter in the Amarna Archive mentions Itur-Addu.

==== Ugarit texts RS 17.0339,a + RS 17.0340 + RS 17.0366 ====
Itur-Addu of Mukish is directly mentioned as one of the rebellers.

Thus (says) the Sun, Šuppiluliuma, Great King, king of Hatti, warrior. When Itur-Addu, king of Mukiš, and Addu-nirari, king of Nuhašši, and Agi-Tešub, king of Niya, turned hostile towards the Sun, the Great King, their lord, and they mustered their troops and captured cities from Ugarit, and they oppressed Ugarit and carried off as captives the subjects of Niqmaddu, king of Ugarit, and devastated Ugarit.

Another translation:

" 2 When Itur-Addu, king of Mukiš, Addu-nerari, 3 king of Nuhašše and Aki-Teššup, king of Nija, 4 rebelled against Šuppiluliuma, 5 they gathered their troops and 6 extorted Ugarit and 8 destroyed the country. 9 Then Niqmaddu turned 10 to the Great King and King of Hatti and wrote: 11 May my lord save me from the hand of the enemy. 14 The kings are blackmailing me." 16 The Great King sent princes and nobles along with infantry to 18 [The text breaks off here. From the context, however, the restoration of the situation in Ugarit and the subsequent homage before Šuppiluliuma emerges. The connecting piece to tablet Vs follows]. 1 And the Great King of Hatti 2 saw Niqmaddu's loyalty. 3 Now both 4 have concluded a contract 5. 6 If 7 in future 8 refugees from 10 other countries 11 leave and 12 enter the service of the king in Ugarit 13, 15 another king of another country 16 may not take them away from 17 the disposal of Niqmaddu and 18 from the disposal of his sons and grandsons, 19 until times distant."

– Extracts from the text of the contract, Table Vs

==== RS 17.0227 ====
Reference to the event is also found in RS 17.0227.

When all the kings of the land of Nuhassi and the king of the land of Mukis were hostile to His Majesty, the great king, their lord, Niqmaddu, king of the land of Ugarit, was at peace with His Majesty, the great king, his lord, and not hostile. Then the kings of the land of Nuhassi and the kings of the kings of the land of Mukis oppressed Niqmaddu, king of the land of Ugarit, saying: "Why are you not hostile to His Majesty along with us?" But Niqmaddu did not agree upon hostilities against His Majesty, the great king, his lord, and His Majesty, the great king, saw the loyalty of Niqmaddu. Now Suppiluliuma, the great king, king of Hatti, has made a treaty for Niqmaddu, king of the land of Ugarit.
