= Niqmepa =

- King of Ugarit
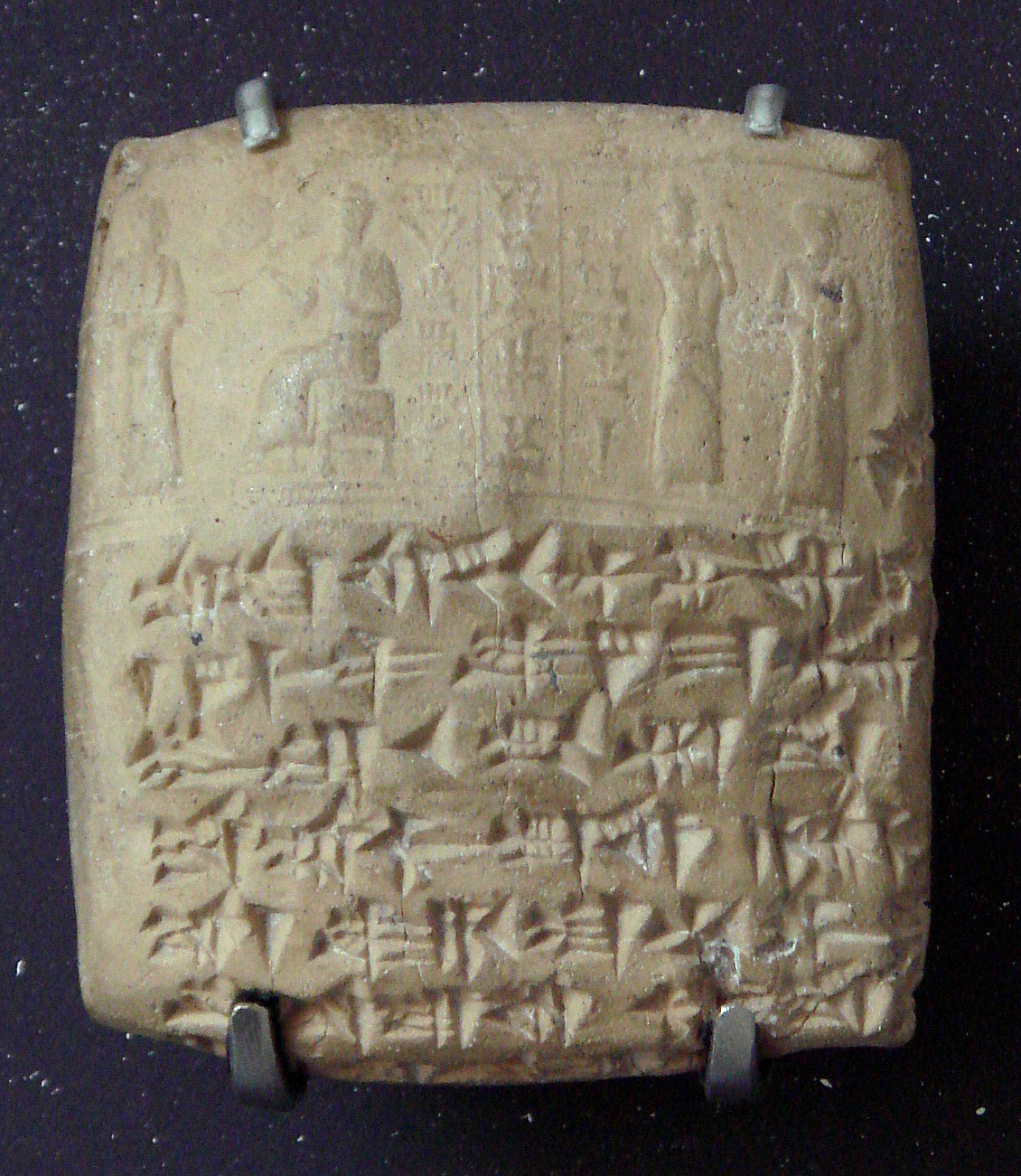
- Text of Law in Akkadian by King Niqmepa with dynastic seal. Ras Shamra. Louvre Museum.

King of Ugarit
- Reign: 1320 BC – 1270 BC
- Predecessor: Arhalba (brother)
- Successor: Ammittamru II
- Died: c. 1270 BC; Ugarit
- Spouse: Ahatmilku
- Issue: Ammittamru II (+2 rival brothers)
- Father: Niqmepa

Niqmepa (died c. 1270 BC) was the fifth-from-last King of Ugarit, a city-state in northwestern Syria.

== Reign ==
=== Accession ===
He was the son of Niqmaddu II, and the brother and successor of Arhalba.

=== Vassal Treaty ===
Niqmepa was installed by the Hittite king Mursili II (c. 1321-1300 BC) after forcing the former king, his brother Arhalba to abdicate the throne in favour of him, and was forced to sign a new treaty declaring explicitly that Ugarit was a vassal state of the Hittites. This was the document labelled as CTH 66, that was found at Ugarit.

Yet another document issued by Mursili II in regard to Niqmepa of Ugarit was also found at Ugarit. This is CTH 64, which contains Mursili II’s edict granting Ugarit the possession of towns claimed previously by Mukiš. The dispute about these towns was also adjudicated before by Mursili’s father Suppiluliuma I in favour of Niqmaddu of Ugarit. Furthermore, Mursili also fixed the border between Ugarit and Mukish.

=== Other events ===
Niqmepa married princess Ahatmilku, of the Amurru kingdom to the south. He continued to reign as a vassal of Muwatalli II, Mursili III and Hattusili III.

== Death ==
After a long reign of about 50 years as the vassal of four successive Hittite kings, Niqmepa was succeeded by his son, Ammittamru II.
