= Niqmaddu II =

Ugartic king

- King of Ugarit

King of Ugarit
- Reign: 30-35 regnal years c. 1350 BC - c. 1320/15 BC
- Predecessor: Ammittamru I
- Successor: Ar-Halba
- Issue: Ar-Halba
- Religion: Ancient Canaanite religion

Niqmaddu II was the second ruler and king of Ugarit, an ancient Syrian city-state in northwestern Syria (c. 1350–1315 BC), succeeding his father, Ammittamru I. He was a vassal ruler under Suppiluliuma I of Hatti.

== Early life ==
Niqmaddu II (Akkadian: 𒃻𒈠𒀭𒅎 Níqmâdâd, "vengeance of Hadad") took his name from the earlier Amorite ruler Niqmaddu, meaning "Addu has vindicated" to strengthen the supposed Amorite origins of his Ugaritic dynasty.

He was the son of Ammittamru I and had a brother Nuriyãnu.

His wife may have been Pisidqi according to a legal text.

== Reign ==
Though the exact date of his accession to the throne of Ugarit is unknown, he might be a contemporary of Akhenaten and Tutankhamun, and also of the Hittite ruler Šuppiluliuma I, and was a vassal of the latter. He had good relations with Egypt and conceded to the Amorites in a dispute over the Shiyannu region early in his reign. He commissioned the Baal Cycle about the god Haddu/Ba'al, and had a son, Niqmepa. He is mentioned in the Baal cycle as King nqmd. He was succeeded briefly by Arhalba who came to the throne during the reign of the Great King Mursili II of Hatti.

=== Egyptian relations ===
Using the high chronology for the New Kingdom, Niqmaddu II would be contemporary with the great kings Tutankhamen, Ay, and Horemheb of the Egyptian Empire.

In Amarna Letter EA 49, Niqmaddu II apparently requested an Egyptian physician and two palace attendants from "Cush", the Egyptian envoy to Ugarit.

(o 001) To the king, the Sun, my lord, a message from Niqma-Haddu, your servant. I fall at the feet of the king, my Sun, my lord. May it be well for the king, the Sun, my lord (and) his household, for his primary wife, for his secondary wives, for [his sons, for his horses] (and) the regular troops, for [all the possessions of the king,] the Sun, my lord. (r 018) [...] the house of my father. Previously [...]. So my lord should grant me two servants, palace attendant(s) from the land of Cush (KUR ka-ši), and grant me a palace official, a physician. There is not a physician here. Now, ask [Ḥa]ramaśśi! (erasure) Herewith (are) [...] and one hundred [...] for [your] greeting [gift].

He is identified in Syrian on an alabaster vase along with a woman in Egyptian court dress, however, the name of the woman on the vase, if ever shown, is not preserved.

=== Hittite vassalage ===
Nimaddu II was contemporary with the great kings Suppiluliuma I, Arnuwanda I and Mursili II of the Hatti Empire. Suppiluliuma I of Hatti conquered the region west of the Euphrates from Tushratta of Mitanni during six military campaigns (c. 1350-1345 BC). During this period, Ammittamru I died, and Niqmaddu II became the new king.

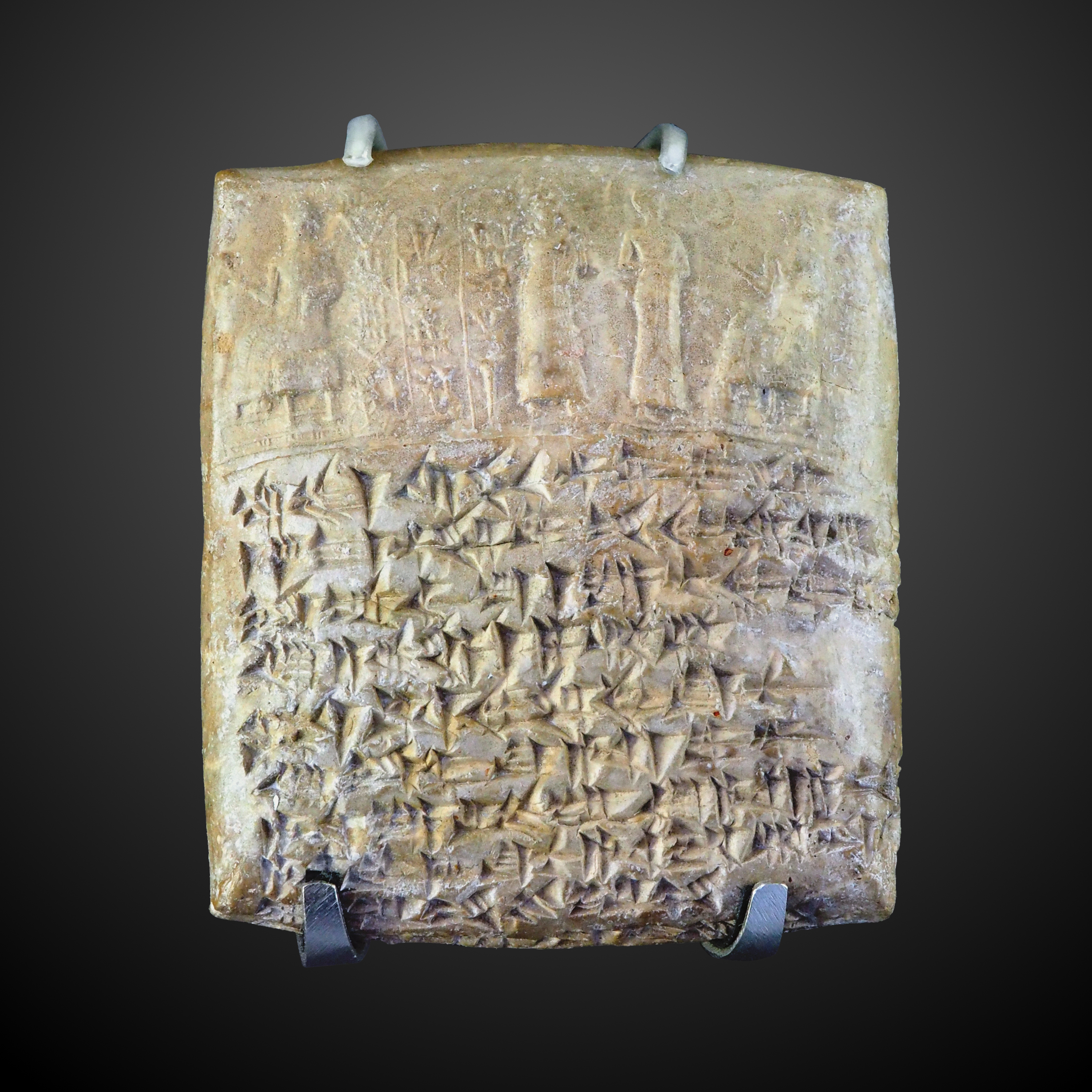
Text of Law in Akkadian by King Niqmaddu, 14th century BC, with dynastic seal. Ras Shamra (ancient Ugarit). Louvre Museum.

In the Hittite Archives there are four letters from the time of Suppiluliuma regarding Ugarit.

- CTH 45 Letter of Šuppiluliuma I to Niqmaddu II of Ugarit
- CTH 46 Treaty of Šuppiluliuma I with Niqmaddu II of Ugarit
- CTH 47 Decree of Šuppiluliuma I setting the tribute of Ugarit (.I Akkadian, .II Hittite)
- CTH 48 Inventory of the tribute of Ugarit to Šuppiluliuma I

==== Treaty ====
At Ugarit, the treaty is known from RS 17.0339,a + RS 17.0340 + RS 17.0366.

The introduction reveals a rebellion against the great king, where Niqmaddu II remained faithful.

Thus (says) the Sun, Šuppiluliuma, Great King, king of Hatti, warrior. When Itur-Addu, king of Mukiš, and Addu-nirari, king of Nuhašši, and Agi-Tešub, king of Niya, turned hostile towards the Sun, the Great King, their lord, and they mustered their troops and captured cities from Ugarit, and they oppressed Ugarit and carried off as captives the subjects of Niqmaddu, king of Ugarit, and devastated Ugarit.

Niqmaddu II asked Suppiluliuma I for aid.

Niqmaddu, king of Ugarit, came to Šuppiluliuma, the great king, saying: "May the Sun, the Great King, my Lord, save me from the hand of the enemy," saying "I myself am the servant of the Sun, the Great King, my lord," saying "I am hostile towards the enemy of my lord, and I am peaceful towards the friend of my lord," saying "The kings are oppressing me!"

Received captives.

The Great King heard the speech of Niqmaddu, and so the Great King Šuppiluliuma sent the sons of the king and the noblemen with troops and chariots to Ugarit, and they attacked the troops of the enemy [in] the midst of Ugarit. [And] they gave [to] Niqmaddu [all of] their captives whom they took (from the enemy).

Showed great hospitality.

Niqmaddu, king of Ugarit, greatly honored the sons of the king and the noblemen of Hatti. He gave them much silver, gold, and copper. Niqmaddu arrived in Alalah before the Sun, the Great King, his lord and a gift [...] to the Sun, the Great King, his lord.

This section emphasizes loyalty.

He took [...] Niqmaddu did [not] involve himself with words of hostility against the king [his lord, and] the Great King [Šuppiluliuma recognized(?)] the loyalty [of Niqmaddu, king(?)] of Ugarit [...] he did not [... any ... scourings] and shavings [...]

In the final portion is several toponyms.

[...] ancient time [...] Ugarit [...] Ugarit [...] all his land [...] Ugarit [... the sons(?)] of his sons, [...] together with the mountains of Šimeru [...] Bīt-hilu [...] Zimmeru, [...] together with Mount Hešmaraši, [..., Ṣuharu], Yarqanu, [...] Kanzata, Magdala, [together with (its)] mountains, the Crossroads [of Pithana] together with Mount Kiburu, [together with] Mount [Ašamtu, together with Mount] Matraniya, ʾUlullu, [Huluru, Halda], Murar, [Naša, Ulmuwa, Yathaba], Yakunaʿamu, [ʿEn-Zuriya, Nidabu], Kamkatiya, [Harbuǵuli, Šanizula], Baqʿatu, together with [its mountain, Halanu, Napṯatu], Ṯamra, Pugulʾu, [...]ʾa, Šeta, Yaʿaniya, <together with> Mount ʾAyalu, together with Mount Hadamgu, Kidkidiya, Paništayu, Naghatu, Halbu-Nana, Šalma, Gulbata, Zamirtu, Śuladu, Maraʾil, Himullu.

Preceded by Ammittamru I	King of Ugarit	Succeeded by Ar-Halba
