= Ammittamru I =

King of Ugarit
- Reign: c. 1350 BC
- Successor: Niqmaddu II
- Died: c. 1350 BC
- Issue: Niqmaddu II
- Religion: Ancient Canaanite religion

Ammittamru I (known in some sources as Amishtammru I or Amistammru I, Akkadian: 𒄠𒈪𒄑𒌓𒊑 Ammîstamri; died c. 1350 BC) was a king of the ancient Syrian city of Ugarit.

== Reign ==
=== Relations with Mitanni ===
Prior to the Great Syrian Wars by Suppiluliuma I of Hittite, most of northern Syria west of the Euphrates River was controlled by Tushratta of Mitanni. During the wars, the Syrian states rebelled against Hittite control. Ugarit was among the states providing less resistance. After the war, the Syrian states became vassals of Hittite.

=== Relations with Egypt ===
In Amarna Letter EA 45, Ammittamru I writes to the Pharaoh of Egypt seeking support. He is variously thought to be Amenhotep III or Amenhotep IV. However, it might also date to the time of Tutankhamen if the Hittites were attacking Mitanni in northern Syria. If Mitanni was breaking up under the threat of the Hittites, a city-state may try to gain overlordship from Egypt. The damaged letter includes emphatic promises of allegiance to Egypt, as the occasion is said to be the repeated threats from a king of a land whose name is broken off, possibly the land of the Hittites, due to their long struggle with the Egyptians.

Another good example for such letters that show submission to Egypt is KTU 2.23 = RS 16.078+.15-24 sent to the contemporary pharaoh that says:

... And I am [your servant] who begs [for life to] the Sun, the great king, my lord. Then do I not pray for the life of his soul before Ba'al Saphon my lord, and length of days for my lord before Amun and before the gods of Egypt who protect the soul of the Sun, the Great King, my lord?

- Note: The reference to "Amun" and "gods of Egypt" indicates that this letter can be dated before or after the introduction of Aten-worship by Akhenaten.

=== Relations with Hatti ===
As Tushratta of Mitanni lost his control of the land west of the Euphrates River, and Suppiluliuma I tried to gain control, the Syrian city-states mobilized a resistance and sought the support of Egypt.

== Succession ==
After his death around 1350 BC he was succeeded by his son Niqmaddu II who concluded a treaty with Suppiluliuma I.

King of Ugarit c. 1350 BC	Succeeded by Niqmaddu II
