= Royal Palace of Ugarit =

Ancient palace on the coast of Syria

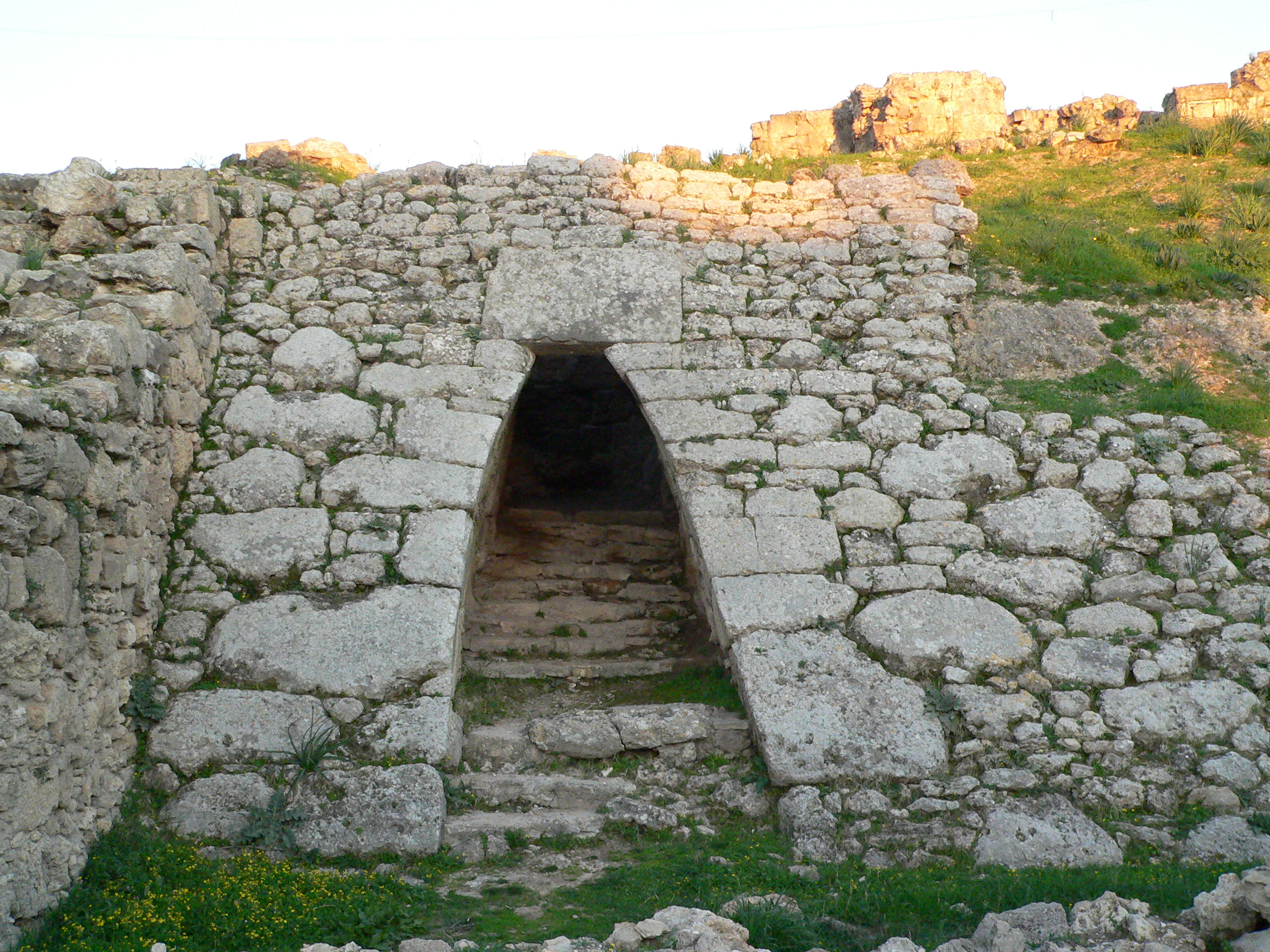
- A corbel arched postern at the Palace
- Interactive map of Royal Palace of Ugarit
- 35.601719°N 35.783008°E
- Type: Royal residence
- Periods: Bronze Age
- Cultures: Canaanite
- Associated with: Niqmaddu II, Niqmepa, Ibiranu, Ammurapi, Ahatmilku
- Location: Ugarit, northwestern Syria
- Part of: Acropolis of Ugarit

History
- Built: c. 15th – c. 13th-century BC
- Abandoned: c. 1180 BC

Site notes
- Material: Ashlar stone, wooden crossbeams, plaster
- Length: 110 metres (360 ft)
- Width: 75 metres (246 ft)
- Area: 6,500 square metres (70,000 sq ft)
- Excavation dates: 1929–1939; 1948–1955
- Archaeologists: Claude F. A. Schaeffer
- Condition: Partial restoration
- Public access: yes

The Royal Palace of Ugarit is a Bronze Age ruins in the former port city of Ugarit on the Mediterranean coast of Syria. The royal residence of the rulers of the ancient Kingdom of Ugarit, it was excavated with the rest of the city from the 1930s by French archaeologist Claude F. A. Schaeffer, and is considered one of the most important finds made there.

== Overview ==
=== Layout ===
The palace is located in the north-west corner of the former city, and originally spanned an area of 6,500 square metres (70,000 sq ft). Its surrounds were enclosed by a fortified wall that dates back to the 15th-century BC.

There were three entrances: the main gate on the northwest, protected by an array of towers with 5-metre (16 ft) thick walls and dubbed today "the Fortress", and smaller accesses in the northeast and the southwest.

The compound consisted of ninety rooms divided between two floors. The rooms were built around four large and four smaller courtyards. Its western end had a large garden, and three underground burial chambers were constructed in the structure’s north side. The ground floor was used for administrative purposes and included offices, archives, storage and staff dwellings. The second floor housed the family quarters, and was accessed through twelve staircases.

=== Architecture ===
The palace was constructed in four major stages between the 15th and 13th-century BC. It was built out of ashlar stone blocks and wooden crossbeams, with walls covered in a thick coat of plain plaster. The fortified wall, which dates back to the 15th-century BC, was built with packed stones at the bottom and had an outward slope of 45 degrees.

The layout is typical of palaces of the Eastern Mediterranean and the Ancient Near East. Its irregular outline and asymmetrical layout are evidence of constant additions and alterations. The burial chambers had corbelled vaults which show a connection with Hittite and Mycenaean architecture.

== Excavation ==
After the chance discovery of Ugarit by local peasants in 1929, French archaeologist Claude F. A. Schaeffer led ten excavation campaigns at the site, which only covered the northwest corner. Work stopped with the advent of World War II and only resumed in 1948. Between 1950 and 1955 Schaeffer led concentrated excavations at the palace which unearthed a vast corpus of tablets and artefacts.

=== Artifacts ===
Objects found at the site include ivory carvings, furniture, stone stelae, and figurines. An Egyptian-made alabaster vase was found, partially damaged. The ornamentation on the vase depicts the wedding of Ugarit King Niqmaddu II to an upper-class Egyptian woman. Other vases of Egyptian origin found at the site include ones carrying the cartouches of Egyptian Kings Ramesses II and Horemheb.

=== Tablets ===
Eight archives of cuneiform tablets were excavated in the palace complex. The corpus included more than a 1,000 tablets, written mostly in Akkadian and Ugaritic. A small corpus of Hurrian and Hittite tablets was also discovered. The tablets were organized by subject in different wings. They included administrative reports about Ugarit's dependencies, judicial records, official correspondence with other rulers, and even practice tablets that new scribes used to learn writing. The tablets included about 36 hymns, known as the Hurrian songs.
