= Bentesina of Amurru =

Ruler of Amurru

Bentesina (c. 1260-1235 BCE; Bentešina; Benteshina) was the ruler of the petty kingdom of Amurru (Akkar plain) in the 13th century BCE. He was the son and successor of Duppi-Tessup. He served as a vassal to the Hittite Empire during the reigns of Muwatalli II and Hattusili III.

== Reign ==
=== Part I ===
Bentešina ascended the throne as a young man after the death of his father, Duppi-Teššup. In Year 4 of Ramesses II of Egypt, Bentesina sat on the throne when the Egyptians invaded Amurru. In Year 5 of Ramesses II, the Battle of Kadesh saw Muwatalli II regain both Kadesh and Amurru, removing Bentesina and installing Šapili.

=== Šapili ===
Šapili was installed by Muwatalli II following the Battle of Kadesh, but was removed again with the accession of Hattusili III.

Muwatalli II reorganized control over Syrian vassal states during his reign in response to the threat from the Egyptian Empire. Benteshina had failed to resist the Egyptian invasion and was forced to defect to the Egyptians, something Muwatalli II did not forgive. As part of this strategy, he replaced the previous Amurru dynasty and installed Šapili as a loyal client ruler for the duration of his reign and that of his successor Mursili III.

=== Part II ===
When Hattusili III became king, Šapili was removed and Bentesina was reinstated as King of Amurru. He was a vassal of both Hattusili III and Tudhaliya IV.

During the reign of Great King Hattusili III of Hatti, Bentešina wrote a letter (CTH 193).

In the reign of Great King Tudhaliya IV of Hatti, Ammistamru II of Ugarit divorced the daughter of Bentešina (CTH 107). Bentešina and Ammistramu II (son of Ahat-Milku) were cousins.

== Succession ==
Bentesina was followed by his son and heir, Šaušgamuwa.

== Attesstations ==
=== Hittite sources ===
He is known from several Hittite texts.

- CTH 92 Treaty of Hattušilis III with Bentešina of Amurru
- CTH 98 letter? with mention of Bentešina and Egypt
- CTH 193 Letter from Bentešina of Amurru to Ḫattušili III.
- CTH 107 Decree of Tuthaliya IV concerning the divorce of King Ammištamru II of Ugarit from the daughter of Bentešina of Amurru
