= Baal with Thunderbolt =

Ugarit stele

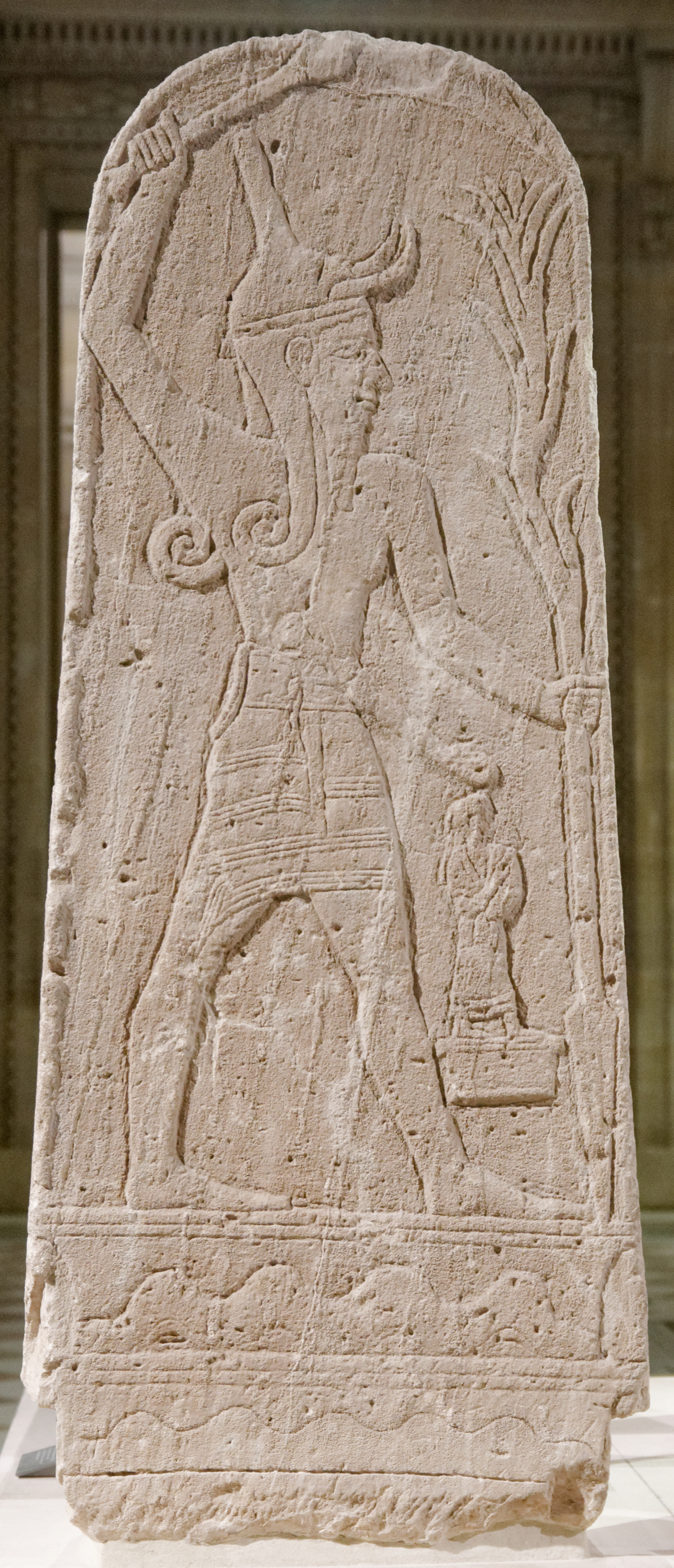
- Photograph of the stele
- Material: Limestone
- Height: 142 centimetres (56 in)
- Width: 50 centimetres (20 in)
- Depth: 28 centimetres (11 in)
- Created: c. 15th century BC
- Period/culture: Late Bronze Age
- Discovered: 1932
- Place: Temple of Baal, Ugarit, Syria
- Present location: Louvre, Paris
- Identification: AO 15775

Baal with Thunderbolt, Baal with Vegetation Spear, or simply the Baal stele are names given to a white limestone bas-relief stele from the ancient kingdom of Ugarit in northwestern Syria. It was discovered in 1932, about 20 metres (66 ft) from the Temple of Baal in the acropolis of Ugarit during excavations directed by French archæologist Claude Schaeffer. The stele depicts Baal (or Hadad), the god of storm and rain as well as that of agriculture, and a smaller male figure. The stele's artistic style has been described as blending Egyptian and Syrian artistic elements. Historian Nicolas Wyatt identified the work as illustrating the importance of Egyptian influence in Syrian art.

Considered the most important of the Ugaritic stelæ, it is displayed at the Louvre in Paris.

== Overview ==
=== Dimensions ===
Carved from white limestone, the stele is wider at the base and measures 142 by 50 centimetres (56 in × 20 in). It depicts two standing male figures: the larger representing Baal, and the smaller most likely representing the king of Ugarit.

=== Figures ===
==== Baal ====
Baal, the god of storms, rain, and agriculture, is the stele's central figure. He is shown facing to the right and standing on a large pedestal. The pedestal bears carved representations of Baal's spheres of power, the mountains and the sea. Baal is shown with a raised right hand brandishing a club or battle-mace overhead. His left hand holds a thunderbolt in the shape of a spearhead that extends towards the ground. The shaft is in the form of a plant. The god is shown wearing a horned helmet. Braided hair falls over his back and his right shoulder. Baal is shown clad only in a kilt with striped decorations and a wide belt with a curved dagger.

==== King of Ugarit ====
A man, who is shown with a bare head and wearing ceremonial dress, is depicted standing on a horned altar between the spear and the god and praying. The smaller figure most likely represents the king of Ugarit.

=== Interpretation ===
The stele is interpreted as showing the king humbly submitting himself to Baal and receiving the god's protection in return. Additionally, Baal's lightning has been interpreted as him thrusting a spear of vegetation into the ground from the sky, symbolising the necessity of the storm for a later harvest. The difference in size between the two figures is interpreted by historian Mark S. Smith as contrasting divine power with the "relative weakness of the king". The horned helmet and thunderbolt represent fertility. According to historian Alberto Green, Baal is portrayed as a 'vigorous, young, graceful, athletic deity marching forward'.

== Excavation ==
The stele was discovered in 1932 during excavations at Ugarit directed by French archæologist Claude Schaeffer. While the stele was unearthed about 20 metres (66 ft) from the Temple of Baal on its southern slope, it was probably originally housed inside the temple. Additionally, eight more stelae were recovered from the area, while another fourteen were unearthed in the Temple of Dagon and throughout the city.

== See also ==
- Baal Cycle
