= Côte d'Azur (disambiguation) =

Côte d'Azur is the French name of the French Riviera, the Mediterranean coastline of the southeast corner of France.

Côte d'Azur may also refer to:

- Côte d'Azur Observatory
- Côte d'Azur Pullman Express, a French de luxe train which ran from 9 December 1929 until May 1939
- Nice Côte d'Azur Airport
- Cote d'Azur, Syria, a beach resort north of Latakia, Syria

== Arts and entertainment ==
- Côte d'Azur (1932 film), French comedy film
- Wild Cats on the Beach, a 1959 Italian-French comedy film with the French-language title Côte d'Azur
- Crustacés & Coquillages, a 2005 French movie released in North America as Côte d'Azur
- Côte D'Azur (album), a 2011 album by The Rippingtons

== See also ==
- Derby de la Côte d'Azur, an association football match contested between the primary clubs based on or near the French Riviera
- Puducherry (union territory), nicknamed La Côte d'Azur de l'Est
