= Ras Ibn Hani =

Archaeological site in Syria

- رأس ابن هاني (Arabic)
- Betyllion
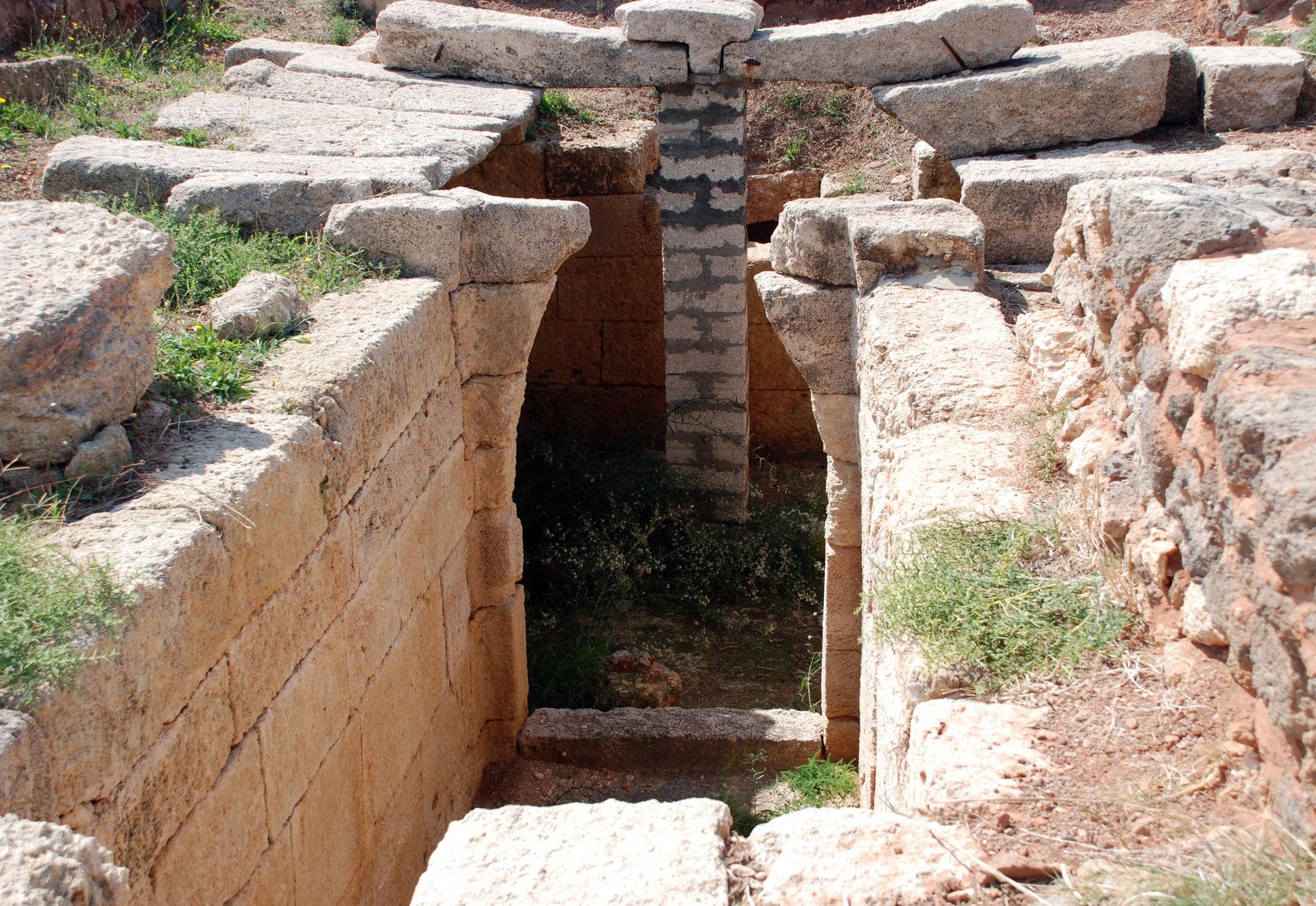
- A tomb at Ras Ibn Hani

- Location within Syria
- 35°35′6″N 35°44′45.6″E
- Type: Settlement
- Periods: Late Bronze Age to Early Byzantine
- Cultures: Canaanite, Hellenistic, Roman
- Satellite of: Ugarit
- Location: Latakia, Syria

Site notes
- Area: 2 ha (4.9 acres)
- Owner: Mixed public and private
- Public access: Partial
- Now is the site of Cote d'Azur

Ras Ibn Hani (Arabic: رأس ابن هاني), Ugaritic Raʾšu, is a small cape located 8 kilometers (5.0 mi) north of Latakia, Syria on the Mediterranean Sea. It is an important archaeological site as it was occupied almost continuously from the late Bronze Age until Byzantine times. The site now is in a major resort area called the Cote d'Azur of Syria.

== History ==
=== Late Bronze ===
In the Late Bronze, Raʾšu was a port and resort on the northern coast in the Petty Kingdom of Ugarit. It was about two-hour walk from the capital Ugarit.

During the middle of the 14th-century BC, a golden age began for Ugarit after stable borders had been achieved through treaties with the Egyptians. During this phase of expansion, a second residence for the king, for example as a summer palace (south palace), and a residence for queen Ahatmilku were built. In the 13th century BC, the site had an estimated 6,000 to 8,000 inhabitants.

=== Iron Age ===
The site survived in modest fashion Ugarit's collapse at the end of the Bronze Age, as the capital Ugarit fell around 1192 BCE.

In inscriptions of Tiglath-pileser III (r. 745-727 BCE), it appear as Re'si-suri meaning "Cape of Tyre". The inscriptions refer to Tyrians (Phoenician) ports from Gubla in the south to Re'si-suri in the north, controlled by the petty king Sibittibi'ili of Gubla (Byblos) who pays tribute to Assyria.

"Ugarit's inhabitants dispersed, but no crisis could neutralize their invaluable asset, the coast's best natural harbour on the promontory of Ras ibn Hani; it became known from its low white cliff as the 'White Harbour' in later Greek peripli, a name which persists in modern Arabic as Minet el-Beida", observes Robin Lane Fox, who identified Ras Ibn Hani as the site later Greeks knew as Betyllion, possibly a Hellenized version, he suggests, of the Semitic bait-El or "house of El, a name which, if that is the derivation, "confirms that Canaanite-Phoenician culture never entirely died at the site".

=== Hellenistic Period ===
Ras Ibn Hani had a Ptolemaic base, since the Third Syrian War (246–241 BC). The Seleucid King Antiochus IX r. 116–96 BC had a small fortification built in the southeast corner.

=== Roman Period ===
Robin Lane Fox notes that the Roman emperor Trajan landed at this spot to join his troops in Syria for the fateful Mesopotamian campaigns of 114–117.

During the first three centuries AD, the city was practically uninhabited, there were probably some buildings on the western tip of the peninsula, the location of which can no longer be explored, as the area has been built over in the meantime. Building remains, pot fragments and coin finds indicate settlement in the early Byzantine period from the 4th to the 6th century.

== See also ==
- Cities of the ancient Near East
- Minet el-Beida
- Ugarit

== Bibliography ==
- Cohen, Getzel M. (2006). The Hellenistic settlements in Syria, the Red Sea Basin, and North Africa. University of California Press. ISBN 978-0-520-24148-0.
- Hölbl, Günther (2013). A History of the Ptolemaic Empire. Routledge. ISBN 9781135119836.
- Naʾaman, Nadav (2004). "Raʾshu, Reʾsi-ṣuri, and the Ancient Names of Ras Ibn Hani". Bulletin of the American Schools of Oriental Research (334): 33–39. doi:10.2307/4150105. ISSN 0003-097X.
