= Niqmaddu III =

Ancient Syrian king

- King of Ugarit

King of Ugarit
- Reign: 1225/1220-1210s BC
- Predecessor: Ibiranu
- Successor: Ammurapi
- Died: c. 1210 BC; Ugarit?
- Spouse: [Ehli-Nikkal], daughter of [Tudhaliya IV] of Hatti.

Niqmaddu III was the seventh known ruler and king of Ugarit, an Ancient Syrian citystate in northwestern Syria, reigning from 1225 to 1220 BC, succeeding king Ibiranu.

== Reign ==
He took his name from the earlier Amorite ruler Niqmaddu, meaning "Addu has vindicated" to strengthen the supposed origins of his Ugaritic dynasty in the Amorites.

A text from the Urtenu archives mentions that he was married to an unnamed Hittite princess. He is mentioned in many juridical texts, most notably in a lawsuit between him and "Kumiya-Ziti", probably a rich merchant from Ura. The author of the tablet is "Nu?me Rašap?", which is detailed as a well-known scribe who was known from the days of Ammittamru II, and another legal text details him, the "Case of Kililya the priest of Istar", which is witnessed by the same witnesses and written by the same scribe.

=== Hittite relations ===
Ugarit was a vassal state of the Tudhaliya IV, the Great King of Hatti (Hittites), and administered through the viceroy of Carchemish. Several tablets are found in the Urtenu archive.

- RS 17.435+ (KTU 2.36+): Letter sent by the Hittite Queen Dowager Puduḫeba to Niqmaddu III. She scolds him for failing to visit the Hittite court, withholding tribute, and complaining about redirected trade caravans between Egypt and Hatti.
- RS 94.2000 Series (House of Urtenu Archives): Documents detailing royal tribute and administrative obligations during the joint/overlapping era of Tudḫaliya IV and Niqmaddu III.
- RSO 23 104 [4] (House of Urtenu Archive): Letter from Ḫaššuwaš-Inara (DUMU LUGAL, Hittite prince/official under Tudḫaliya IV) addressed directly to Niqmaddu III regarding tribute (mānaḫātu) and agricultural delivery requirements.
- RS 34.136 (RSO 14 / Ras Shamra-Ougarit XIV): Letter from the King of Carchemish (Talmi-Teššub, viceroy) recounting diplomatic strain, specifically recalling how Ugaritic emissaries were bound like criminals after failing to meet imperial tribute demands.
- RS 94.2173 (and related Urtenu texts): Documents referencing the marriage of Niqmaddu III to an unnamed daughter of a Hittite king (a princess of Hatti) to reinforce dynastic submission.

Preceded by Ibiranu	King of Ugarit	Succeeded by Ammurapi
