= DU-Teššup of Amurru =

Ruler of Amurru

DU-Teššup
- King of Amurru
- Reign: x regnal years c. 1310-13xx BC
- Predecessor: Aziru
- Successor: Duppi-Teššup
- [...]
- Issue: Duppi-Teššup; Aḫat-milki (daughter)
- Father: Aziru
- Mother: [...]

DU–Teššup was the ruler of Amurru (c. ~1310 BCE), a vassal of Mursili II of Hatti, son of Aziru and father of Duppi-Teššup.

Not to be confused with DU–Teššup of Barga.

== Early Life & Family ==
DU-Tessup was the son of Aziru of Amurru (1350-132x BC). He was the grandson of Abdi-Ashirta. DU-Teššup's name refers to the Hurrian god of sky and storm, Teshub. Aziru and Abdi-Ashirta, were some of the major instigating forces (in the north) causing conflict with the Egyptian pharaoh, as cities ('city-states'), and regions were under constant threat and destruction in the northern, and western Canaan region (Lebanon, and southern Syria).

He married [...] who gave birth to his son Duppi-Teššup. His daughter Aḫat-milki married Niqmepa of Ugarit.

=== Crown Prince ===
DU-Tessup served a long time as crown prince under his father Aziru. Aziru became ruler in the reign of Suppiluliums I and did not die until the reign of Mursili II, making DU-Tessup of advanced age when he finally became king for a short period.

In Year 7 of Mursili II (c. 1315 BCE), the "Second Syrian Rebellion" by Tette of Nuhasse and Kinza (supported by Horemheb of Egypt) saw Aziru and DU-Tessup remain loyal to Mursili II.

== Reign ==
Following the death of Aziru (c. 1315 BCE), DU-Tessup became the petty king of Amurru and subject to the great king Mursili II of Hatti (Hittite Empire). His reign lasted for a short time before he was succeeded by Duppi-Tessup.

His son made a vassal treaty with Mursili II (c. 1321 BC) which provides most of our knowledge about DU-Tessup.

CTH 62 Mursili II to Duppi-Teššup: Aziras was the grandfather of you, Duppi- Tessub. He rebelled against my father, but submitted again to my father. When the kings of Nuhassi land and the kings of Kinza rebelled against my father, Aziras did not rebel. As he was bound by treaty, he remained bound by treaty. As my father fought against his enemies, in the same manner fought Aziras. Aziras remained loyal toward my father [as his overlord] and did not incite my father's anger. My father was loyal toward Aziras and his country; he did not undertake any unjust action against him or incite his or his country's anger in any way. 300 (shekels of) refined and first- class gold, the tribute which my father had imposed upon your father, he brought year for year; he never refused it.

When my father became god and I seated myself on the throne of my father, Aziras behaved toward me just as he had behaved toward my father. It happened that the Nuhassi kings and the king of Kinza rebelled a second time against me. But Aziras, your grandfather, and DU- Tessub, your father, [did not take their side]; they remained loyal to me as their lord. [When he grew too old] and could no longer go to war and fight, DU-Tessub fought against the enemy with the foot soldiers and the charioteers of the Amurru land just as he had fought with foot soldiers and charioteers against the enemy. And the Sun destroyed them.

(gap in which the reign of DU-Tessub was dealt with)

(DU-Tessub recommends his son as his successor:) " [ . . . When I die, accept my son] Duppi-Tessub as your vassal."

When your father died, in accordance with your father's word I did not drop you. Since your father had mentioned to me your name with great praise, I sought after you. To be sure, you were sick and ailing, but although you were ailing, I, the Sun, put you in the place of your father and took your brothers (and) sisters and the Amurru land in oath for you.

== Death ==
DU-Tessup died during the reign of his overlord Mursili II of Hatti, some time after the second rebellion of Nuhasse and Kinza (c. 1315 BCE). He was succeeded by his son, Duppi-Teššup.

== Attestations ==
=== Hittite sources ===
Several Hittite tablets concern Amurru.

- CTH 62 Treaty of Muršili II with Duppi-Teššup of Amurru mentions his father DU-Teššup

=== Amarna Archive ===
DU–Teššup is the presumed author of tablet-letter EA 169-(EA is for 'el Amarna') written to pharaoh, requesting Aziru's return from "forced" consultation. DU–Teššup is not mentioned by name in the Amarna letters corpus.

Aziru was called to Egypt to explain his actions: bad, and good. Aziru wrote, as did his father Abdi-Ashirta, that he was protecting his regions. All the letters from both Aziru and Abdi Ashirta reflect: "the middle conflict", allegiance to pharaoh to the south (northeast Egypt), control and protection (calling 'to guard') the local cities (and their rulers), in northern Canaan, and personal aspirations of total control, and their personal aggrandizement. (This probably partially led to Abdi-Ashirta's death and removal from the scene, but since his son Aziru became the major player, Abdi-Ashirta's age can also be presumed.)

==== Amarna Letter EA 169 ====
Amarna Letter EA 169 often given the title: "Aziru in Egypt" With introduction damaged, etc.:

[...may all g]o well.
[In me] there is no [dupl]icity. ...[Y]ou may keep me alive [and] you may put me to death. To you alone do I look, and you alone are my lord. So may my lord heed his servants. Do not delay Aziru, your servant, there (any longer). Send him here immediately so he may guard the countries-(KUR-MEŠ(lands)) of the king, our lord.
Moreover, to Tutu, my lord: "Hear the words of the kings of Nuhašše". They said to me: "You sold your father [t]o the king of Egypt-(named: Mizri) for gold, and w[he]n will he-(pharaoh) let him go from Egypt?" All the country and all the Sutean forces said to me, also to that point,—"Aziru is not going to get out of Egypt." And now the Suteans are deserting the country [and I am] repeatedly informed, "Your father is staying [i]n Eg[yp]t, [and so] we are going to wage war against you."... ...Listen, [my lord. Tut]u, my lord, [let] Aziru go [immediately. ...] ... ...[Now indeed ever]one is d[eser]ting. -EA 169, lines 3–47 (many lacunae)

Besides Pharaoh, Tutu, the Egyptian official is addressed. The local Suteans (mercenaries, etc.?) and the region of Nuhašše are also the subject of this letter.

== King List ==
- Abdi-Ashirta (founder)
- Aziru (Hittite Overlord: Suppiluliuma I; Tutankhamen)
- DU-Teššup (Hittite Overlord: Suppiluliuma I)
- Duppi-Teššup (Hittite Overlord: Mursili II; Horemheb-Seti I)
- Bentesina (Hittite Overlord: Hattusili III; Ramesses II)
- Sausgamuwa (Hittite Overlord: Tudhaliya IV)

== See also ==
- Tutu (Egyptian official)
- Amarna letters–localities and their rulers
- Suteans
- Nuhašše
