= Letter of Piha-walwi =

The Letter of Prince Piha-walwi of Hatti to King Ibiranu of Ugarit (CTH 110) is a Hittite diplomatic text of the 13th century BC.

The letter is a sample of diplomatic correspondence between the Hittites and their vassal states in Syria. Written in the Akkadian language on a clay tablet (RS 17.247), it was found in the archives of Ugarit, excavated at Ras Shamra, Syria.

Piha-walwi, apparently a high-ranking Hittite official holding the title of prince, rebukes King Ibiranu of Ugarit for failing to seek an audience with the Hittite king, presumably Tudhaliya IV. He demands that Ibiranu rectify this immediately by sending messengers with gifts for both the king and Piha-walwi himself:

Thus says Prince Piha-walwi: Say to my son Ibiranu: "At the moment all is well with His Majesty. Why have you not come before His Majesty since you have assumed the kingship of the land of Ugarit? And why have you not sent your messengers? Now His Majesty is very angry about this matter. Now send your messengers quickly before His Majesty, and send the king's presents together with my presents.

Ibiranu seems to have complied, as in another letter, the Ugaritic ambassador to Hattusa warns Ibiranu that the Hittite king was offended by the inferior gems he received, recommending that the king expects to be presented with lapis lazuli.
