= Ugarit =

Ancient port city in western Syria and northern levant

- 𐎜𐎂𐎗𐎚
- Raʾs Shamrā (Arabic: رأس شمرا)
- Location within Syria
- 35.602°N 35.782°E
- Type: Settlement
- Periods: Neolithic, Late Bronze Age
- Location: Latakia Governorate, Syria
- Region: Fertile Crescent

History
- Built: c. 7000 BC
- Abandoned: c. 1185 BC
- Event: Bronze Age Collapse

Site notes
- Excavation dates: 1928–1939, 1950–2008
- Archaeologists: Claude Schaeffer, Henri de Contenson, Jean Margueron, Marguerite Yon, Yves Calvet, Bassam Jamous
- Condition: Ruins
- Owner: Public
- Public access: Yes

Ugarit (/juːˈɡɑːrɪt, uː-/; Ugaritic: 𐎜𐎂𐎗𐎚, ủgrt /ʾUgarītu/) was an ancient Levantine coastal city located in what is today northern Syria, at a site known in Arabic as Ras Shamra or Tell Shamra. Since its discovery in 1928, the site has revealed the oldest known systematic use of an alphabet. Ugaritic texts were written in a previously unknown Northwest Semitic tongue—the Ugaritic language. Archaeological excavations of Ugarit show evidence of occupation since the 8th millennium BC. Research has focused on the late Bronze Age levels; relatively little is known about earlier occupation.

Ugarit is 10 km (6.2 mi) north of the Syrian city Latakia; at its zenith it ruled an area roughly equivalent to the modern Latakia Governorate.

== History ==
Ugarit has its origins in the Neolithic period of the Fertile Crescent. The site was occupied from the end of the 8th millennium BC and continued as a settlement through the Near Eastern Chalcolithic and Bronze Ages until its destruction c. 1185 BC. During the Late Bronze Age (c. 1500 – c. 1200 BC) the settlement saw significant growth, culminating in the establishment of the Kingdom of Ugarit.

The city had close ties to the Hittite Empire, in later periods as a vassal state. It sent tribute to Egypt at times, and maintained trade and diplomatic relations with Alashiya (possibly Cyprus), as documented in archives recovered from the site and corroborated by Mycenaean and Cypriot pottery found there. The polity was at its height from c. 1450 – c. 1185 BC, when it was destroyed, along with the sites of many other polities that fell in the Late Bronze Age collapse of 12th century BC. Both Tell Sukas and nearby Tell Tweini (proposed as ancient Gibala), a coastal city at the southern edge of the Kingdom of Ugarit, were also destroyed at this time.

=== Neolithic, Chalcolithic Age ===
- Pre-Pottery Neolithic, Stratum 16
- Pre-Pottery Neolithic, Stratum 15
- Halafian Chalcolithic, Stratum 14
- Halafian Chalcolithic, Stratum 13
- Chalcolithic Ugarit Stratum 12

=== Early Bronze Age ===
- EB I-II - Ugarit Stratum 11
- EB III - Ugarit Stratum 10
- EB IV - Ugarit Stratum 9

=== Middle Bronze Age ===
The Middle Bronze Age emerged after a major drought event that ended around 2020 BC. In Mesopotamia, the Fall of Ur III led to the Isin-Larsa period.

==== Middle Bronze I ====
Ugarit (Stratum 8) provides material from MB I.

==== Middle Bronze IIA ====
Around 1820 BC (MB IIA), the Great Kingdom of Yamhad (Aleppo) emerged under its King Sumu-Epuh as a regional power. Ugarit (Stratum 7) would eventually become a vassal of Yamhad along with several other petty kingdoms in the Northern Levant (Syria).

The Mari Archive (c. 1765 BC) mentions Ugarit. Mari was a kingdom located on the Middle Euphrates to the east of the Yamhad Empire. The archive contained cuneiform tablets written in Akkadian. Trade would have gone from Ugarit, Aleppo, Emar, Mari down to Babylon. Zimri-Lim of Mari (r. 1775–1760 BC) also made a state visit to Ugarit.

Ugarit had contacts with the Egyptian Middle Kingdom (c. 2000 – c. 1700 BC). One artifact is a carnelian bead inscribed with the name of Senusret I. A stela and a statuette from the Egyptian pharaohs Senusret III and Amenemhet III have also been recovered; it is unclear at what time these objects were brought to Ugarit.

==== Middle Bronze IIB ====
In MB IIB (c. 1628 – c. 1590 BC), the Hattusili I of Hatti attacked Yamhad around 1620 with Mursili I of Hatti making new raids around 1600/1590 BC, causing the Great Kingdom of Yamhad to collapse. Ugarit (Stratum 6) was relatively shielded lying on the coast behind a mountain range. Large parts of Inner Syria were devastated by the Hittite onslaught ending MB IIB. In the Northern Levant there is no MB IIC (c. 1590 – c. 1550 BC) as in the Southern Levant, but the material culture changes to LB IA.

=== Late Bronze Age ===
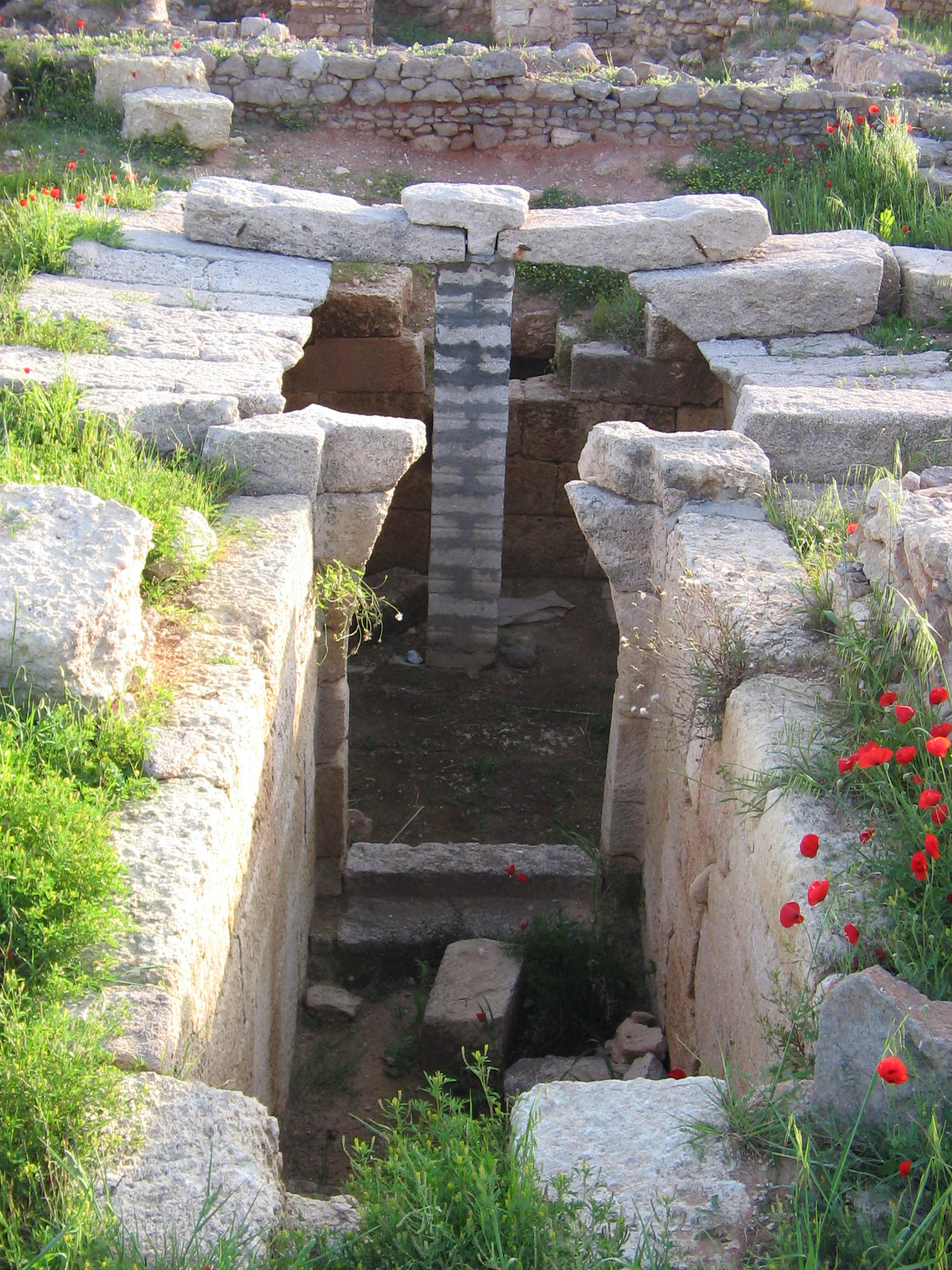
A tomb in the Royal palace's courtyard

The city reached its golden age between 1500 BC and 1200 BC when it ruled a mercantile coastal kingdom, trading with Egypt, Cyprus, Aegean states (primarily Minoan Crete), polities in Syria, the Hittites, cities of the Levantine core (including Ascalon in Canaan), and much of the eastern Mediterranean. Five of the Egyptian Amarna letters from the mid-14th century BC were written in Ugarit. The population of Ugarit in this period is estimated to be between 7,000 and 8,000 individuals. The kingdom of Ugarit controlled about 2,000 km^{2} on average.

In the mid-14th century BC, Ugarit was ruled by king Ammittamru I. A letter (EA45) sent by him, probably to pharaoh Amenhotep III (1388–1351 BC), expresses cordial diplomatic relations between the two. During the reign of his son Niqmaddu II (c. 1350 – c. 1315 BC) Ugarit became a vassal of the Hittite Empire, first under a viceroy in Karkemiš and then, with the Hititte collapse, directly under Karkemiš. During the reign of Niqmaddu III Ugarit was one of several vassals which supplied troops to support the Hittites against the Suteans in a battle at Tuttul (possibly modern Tell Bi’a though there were two cites with that name in the region). Diplomatic relations with Egypt continued, as evidenced by two letters sent by Niqmaddu II (EA49) and his wife Ḫeba (EA48), probably sent to Akhenaten (1351–1334 BC). The former includes a request from the Egyptian king to send a physician to Ugarit.

=== Destruction ===
Destruction of Ugarit
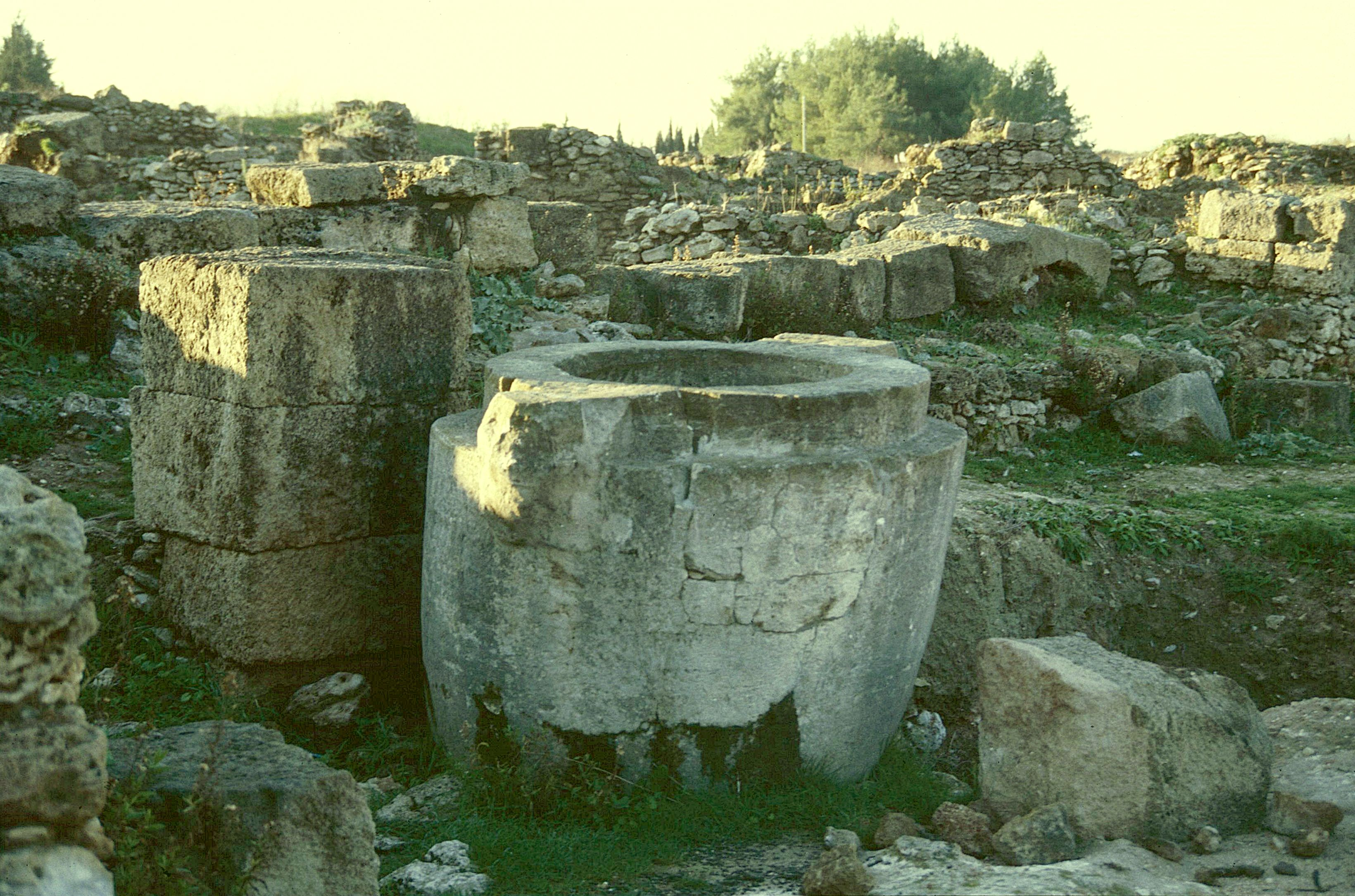
- Ruins of Ugarit.
Date	c. 1190 BC
Location	Ugarit
Result	Sea Peoples victory; Destruction and collapse of the Ugarit city-state

Belligerents
Ugarit	unknown (probably the Sea Peoples)

Commanders and leaders
Ammurapi	unknown

Units involved
unknown	'Seven ships of the Enemy'

From the late 13th century into the early 12th century BC the eastern Mediterranean faced severe and widespread food shortages, possibly from crop failures due to climate change or plant disease. The kings of Ugarit—a major supplier and transporter of foodstuffs—received a number of desperate pleas for food from neighboring states. Eventually Ugarit itself faced shortage and hunger. A letter from Egyptian pharaoh Merenptah (r. 1213 – 1203 BC) referred to a message sent by the ruler of Ugarit:

So you had written to me: “Could I not have demanded my needs [from] the Great King, the king of Egypt, my lord? I demand this request: [In] the land of Ugarit there is a severe hunger (bi-ru-ú dan-niš): May my lord save [the land of Ugarit], and may the king give grain (ZÍZ.AN.MEŠ) to save my life … and to save the citizens of the land of Ugarit.

The last king of Ugarit, Ammurapi (c. 1215 – c. 1180 BC), was a contemporary of the last known Hittite king, Suppiluliuma II. A letter by Ammurapi stresses the seriousness of the crisis faced by many Near Eastern states due to attacks from outsiders. Ugarit's army and navy joined with Hittite forces to stem the oncoming enemy; the allies eventually had to fall back from Anatolia to the Syrian frontier. Ammurapi's response to the king of Alashiya's appeal for assistance from highlights the desperate situation in Ugarit and across the eastern Mediterranean:

My father, behold, the enemy's ships came (here); my cities(?) were burned, and they did evil things in my country. Does not my father know that all my troops and chariots(?) are in the Land of Hatti, and all my ships are in the Land of Lukka? ... Thus, the country is abandoned to itself. May my father know it: the seven ships of the enemy that came here inflicted much damage upon us.

Eshuwara, the senior governor of Alashiya, responded:

As for the matter concerning those enemies: (it was) the people from your country (and) your own ships (who) did this! And (it was) the people from your country (who) committed these transgression(s) ... I am writing to inform you and protect you. Be aware!

In the end Ammurapi begged for forces from the Hittite viceroy at Karkemiš. The invaders had captured the kingdom's other port, Ra’šu, and were advancing on the city of Ugarit.

To the king, my lord say, thus Ammurapi, your servant.… I wrote you twice, thrice, [new]s regarding the enemy! … May my lord know that now the enemy forces are stationed at Ra’šu, and their avant-guard forces were sent to Ugarit. Now may my lord send me forces and chariots, and may my lord save me from the forces of this enemy!

The viceroy sent troops to assist Ugarit, but Ugarit had already been sacked when the Hittite forces reached the city. A letter written to the viceroy after the destruction said:

When your messenger arrived, the army was humiliated and the city was sacked. Our food in the threshing floors was burnt and the vineyards were also destroyed. Our city is sacked. May you know it! May you know it!

== Language and literature ==
=== Alphabet ===
Scribes in Ugarit appear to have developed the oldest systematically used alphabet around 1400 BC; 30 letters, corresponding to sounds, were inscribed on clay tablets. The exact logic behind the design of Ugaritic letters is still unknown but proving single origin has remained difficult up until today. While the letters show little or no formal similarity to the Phoenician, the standard letter order (seen in the Phoenician alphabet as ʔ, B, G, D, H, W, Z, Ḥ, Ṭ, Y, K, L, M, N, S, ʕ, P, Ṣ, Q, R, Š, T) shows strong similarities between the two, suggesting that the Phoenician and Ugaritic systems were not wholly independent inventions. A Unicode block for Ugaritic has been defined.

=== Ugaritic language ===
The existence of the Ugaritic language is attested to in texts from the 14th through the 12th century BC. Ugaritic is usually classified as a Northwest Semitic language and therefore related to Hebrew, Aramaic, and Phoenician, among others. Its grammatical features are highly similar to those found in Classical Arabic and Akkadian. It possesses two genders (masculine and feminine), three cases for nouns and adjectives (nominative, accusative, and genitive); three numbers: (singular, dual, and plural); and verb aspects similar to those found in other Northwest Semitic languages. The word order in Ugaritic is verb–subject–object (VSO) and subject-object-verb (SOV); possessed–possessor (NG) (first element dependent on the function and second always in genitive case); and noun–adjective (NA) (both in the same case (i.e. congruent)).

=== Ugaritic literature ===
A Baal statuette from Ugarit

Apart from royal correspondence with neighboring Bronze Age monarchs, Ugaritic literature from tablets found in the city's libraries include mythological texts written in a poetic narrative, letters, legal documents such as land transfers, a few international treaties, and a number of administrative lists. Fragments of several poetic works have been identified: the "Legend of Keret", the "Legend of Danel", the Ba'al tales that detail Baal-Hadad's conflicts with Yam and Mot, for pre-eminence under the God El among other fragments.

== Rulers ==
Because all texts found at Ugarit date between roughly 1350 BC and 1185 BC, essentially all that is known about earlier rulers of Ugarit comes from the Ugaritic King List (UKL). It is, however, known that Ugarit was active earlier in the millennium from Mari correspondence though it is not clear that the site maintained continuity of occupation in the intervening period. The first UKL exemplar found, alphabetic cuneiform KTU 1.113 (RS 24.257), was written in the Akkadian language and only a fragment with the names of only some of the rulers surviving. It was determined that there were originally 52 names on the list. It was not clear if the list ran in direct or retrograde order. Subsequently, four more exemplars have been found, syllabic cuneiform RS 88.2012, RS 94.2518, RS 94.2528 and RS 94.2501 (incomplete), also written in the Akkadian language. All 52 names are preceded by a Dingir character indicating that that ruler had been deified. Deification of rulers first appeared in the Akkadian Empire period and by the Old Babylonian period had become relatively common. Attempts have been made to link one ruler entry, Krt, with the figure Kirta known from the literary composition "The Legend of Kirta".

A number of Late Bronze Age Ugarit rulers used a cylinder seal (not yet found) reading "Yaqarum, son of Niqmaddu, king of Ugarit". Yaqarum is the first (or in some interpretations the last) name on the UKL. It is assumed that this seal was an heirloom used to add legitimacy to the current ruler. Alternate views was Yaqarum was a tradition mythical name for the Ugarit ruler. There were two exemplars of the seal, one well cut and dated to the Middle Bronze Age and one crudely cut and dated to the Late Bronze Age. Late Bronze rulers also occasionally used a ring seal.

LBA Ruler	Reigned	Comments
Ammittamru I	c. 13xx – c. 1350 BC	
Niqmaddu II	c. 1350 – c. 1315 BC	Contemporary of Hittite ruler Suppiluliuma I
Arhalba	c. 1315 – c. 1313 BC	Contemporary of Hittite ruler Mursili II
Niqmepa	c. 1313 – c. 1260 BC	Treaty with Mursili II; Son of Niqmadu II; Queen was Ahatmilku
Ammittamru II	c. 1260 – c. 1235 BC	Contemporary of Amurru ruler Bentisina; Son of Niqmepa
Ibiranu	c. 1235 – c. 1225 BC	Addressee of the letter of Piha-walwi
Niqmaddu III	c. 1225 – c. 1215 BC	
Ammurapi	c. 1200 BC	Contemporary of Chancellor Bay of Egypt. Ugarit is destroyed in his reign.

== Archaeology ==
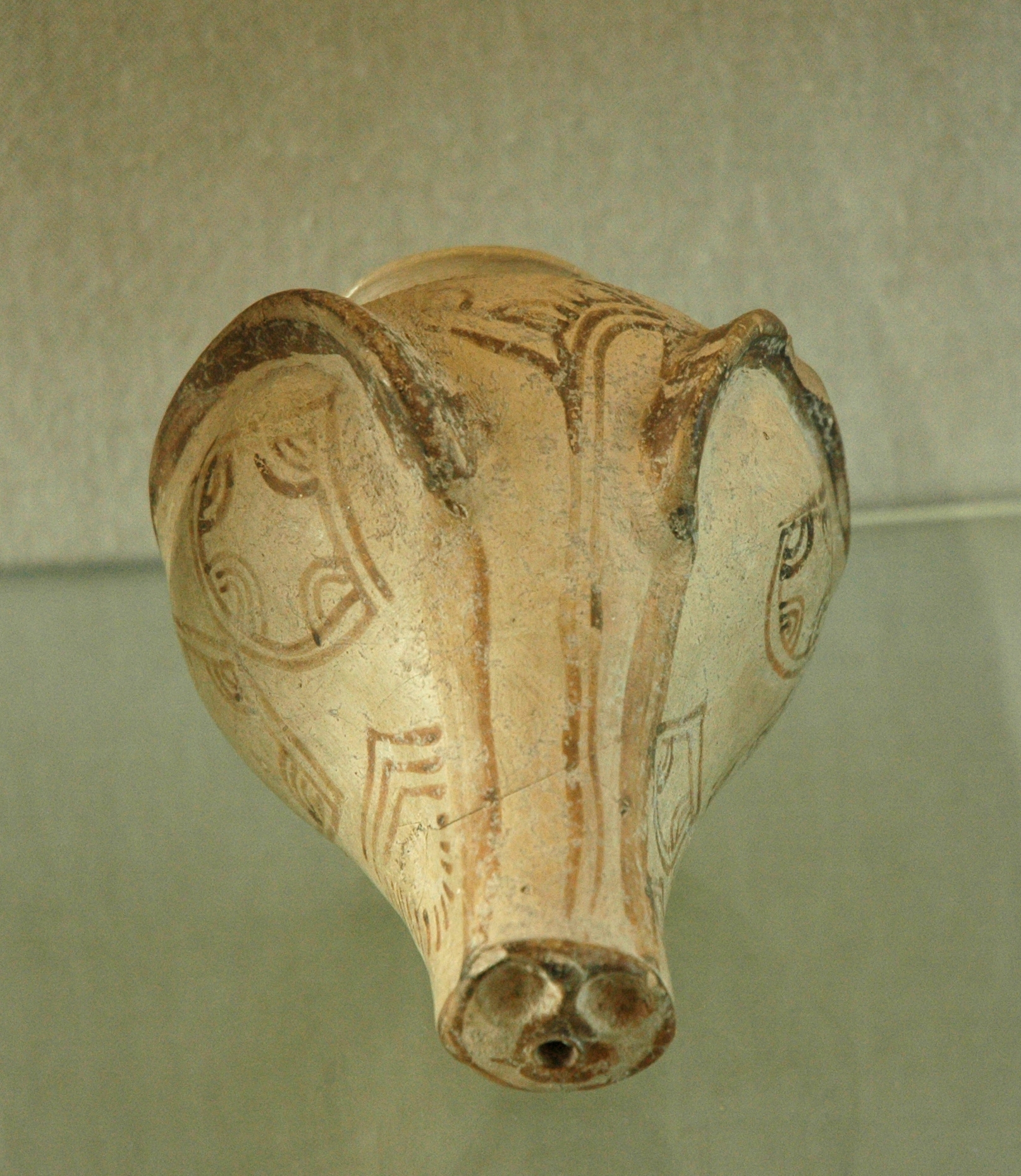
Mycenaean ceramic imported to Ugarit, 14th–13th century BC.

Archaeological soundings of Ugarit indicate that it was first occupied in the Neolithic period, no later than the eighth millennium BC. Only the highest—i.e., the newest—levels of the city's ruins have been excavated. The recovered evidence gives a picture of Ugaritic civilization just before its destruction in the Late Bronze Age collapse of the early 12th century BC. This evidence includes many caches of cuneiform tablets found inside libraries.

While the chronology of the ancient Near East and that of ancient Egypt are not perfectly synchronized, the trove of Ugaritic texts and artifacts has proven invaluable for precise chronological dating.

For example, a recovered tablet shows that Chancellor Bay, an official of the Egyptian queen Twosret, was in communication with Ammurapi, the last ruler of Ugarit. It was already established that Bay was in office from approximately 1194 to 1192 BC. The two pieces of evidence together thus set an upper limit on the year of Ugarit's destruction: 1194 BC.

By the same method, the Ugarit trove allowed archaeologists to establish dates across the eastern Mediterranean with greater precision. For example:

1. The destruction levels of the ruins—i.e., the archaeological strata comprising Ugarit when it was destroyed—contain Late Helladic (LH) IIIB pottery but no pottery of the succeeding LH IIIC phase (see Mycenaean period). To fix an end date of Ugarit would thus prove crucial to establishing the chronology of the LH IIIC phase in mainland Greece.
2. An Egyptian sword bearing the name of pharaoh Merneptah was recovered from the destruction levels. A recovered cuneiform tablet showed that Ugarit was destroyed sometime after Merneptah's death in 1203 BC.
3. An early consensus held that Ugarit was destroyed by no later than the eighth year of the reign of pharaoh Ramesses III, 1178 BC.
4. Radiocarbon dating combined with translations of cuneiform records and the absolute dating of recorded astronomical events, e.g., an eclipse in 1192 BC, indicate destruction between 1192 and 1190 BC.
5. The beginning of the LH IIIC in mainland Greece could thus be dated to 1190 BC.

A large number of arrowheads were recovered from the destruction level in 2021. Their typology has not been published as yet.

=== Discovery and excavations ===
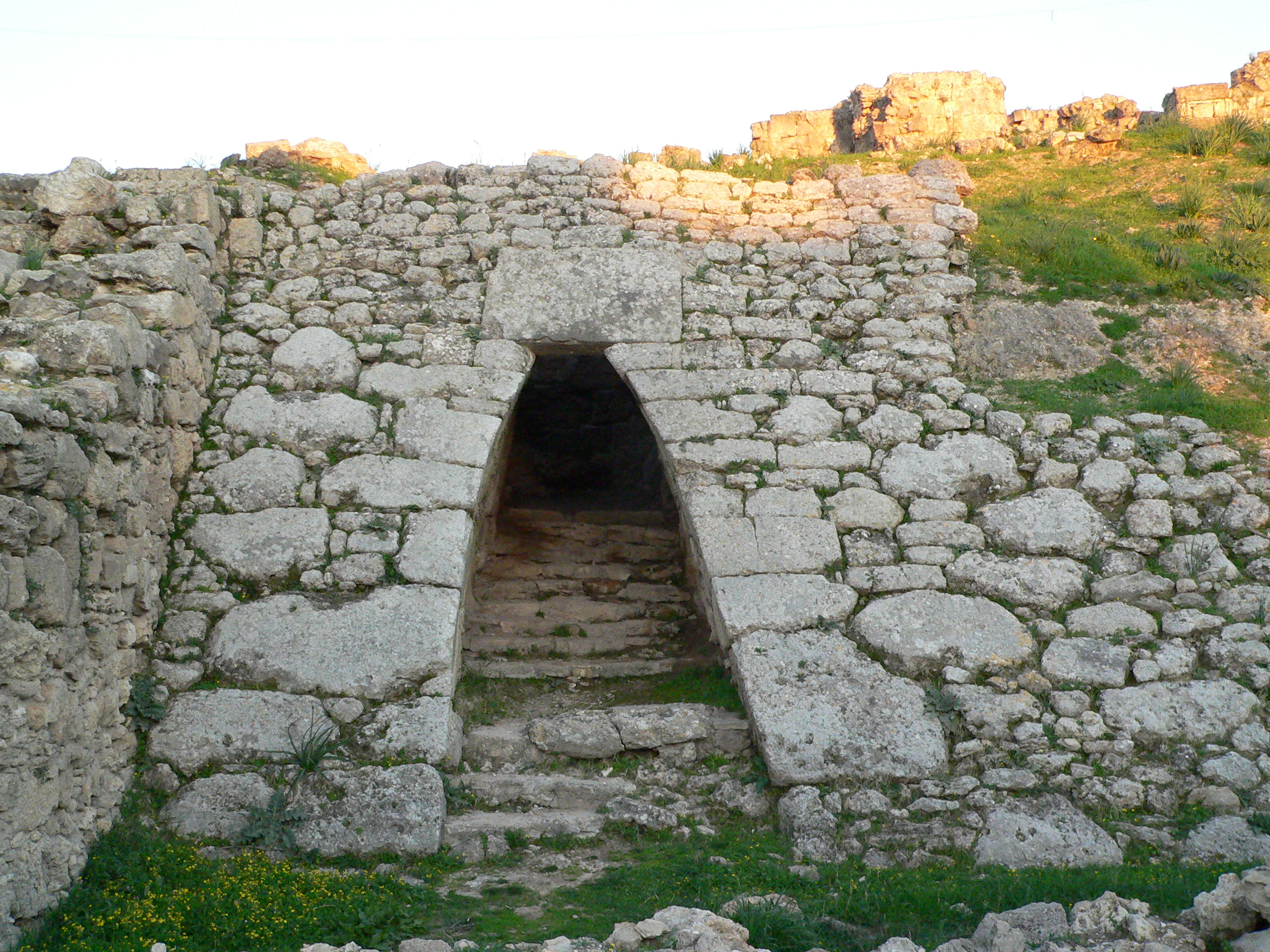
Entrance to the Royal Palace of Ugarit

After its destruction in the early 12th century BC, Ugarit's location was forgotten until 1928 when a peasant accidentally opened an old tomb while plowing a field. At that time the region was part of the Alawite State and not in Syria. The uncovered area was the necropolis of Ugarit, located in the nearby seaport of Minet el-Beida. Excavations have since revealed a city with a prehistory reaching back to c. 6000 BC.

The site covers an area of about 28 hectares with a maximum height of 20 meters at the top of the acropolis. The site is surrounded by a city wall with one known fortified gate, though four gates are believed to have existed. Since the Late Bronze Age about 50 meters have been eroded from the north end of the site by the Nahr Chbayyeb river. The southern slope of the mound, or tell, is covered by orange groves, preventing excavation. A brief investigation of a looted tomb at the necropolis of Minet el-Beida was conducted by Léon Albanèse in 1928, who then examined the main tell of Ras Shamra. Beginning in 1929 excavations of Ugarit were conducted by a French team called the Mission de Ras Shamra led by archaeologist Claude Schaeffer from the Musée archéologique in Strasbourg. Work continued until 1939 when it was interrupted by the outbreak of World War II.

The French excavation, now the Mission Archeologique Française de Ras Shamra-Ougarit, resumed in 1950, led again by Claude Schaeffer until 1970. At that point, directorship passed to Henri de Contenson, then Jean-Claude Margueron from 1975 to 1976. Marguerite Yon would direct the mission from 1978 to 1998. After 44 excavation seasons all of the numerous finds and their findspots were collated. In 2005 the excavation became a joint French and Syrian effort led by Valérie Matoïan and Khozama Al-Bahloul. Excavations were interrupted by the Syrian civil war, which began in 2011.

Archaeologists have defined a number of occupation strata at the site based on the excavations:

Name	Years	Notes
Stratum 15	c. 4500 BC	Pre-Pottery Neolithic = RS 5-C
Stratum 14	c. 4000 BC	Neolithic with pottery = RS 5 A-B
Stratum 13	4000–3400 BC	Halaf chalcolithic = RS 4-C (4 A-B)
Stratum 12	c. 3300 BC	'Ubayd chalcolithic = RS 4 A-B (with some RS 3)
Stratum 11	c. 2800 BC	Early Bronze 1 - 2 = RS 3/1 or III B-C; = UA 1
Stratum 10	2500–2300 BC	Early Bronze 3 = RS 3/2 or III A 2 + 3; = UA 2
Stratum 9	2300–2100 BC	Early Bronze 4 = RS 3/3 or III A; = UA 3
Stratum 8	2100–1900 BC	Middle Bronze = RS 2/1 = UM 1
Stratum 7	1900–1750 BC	Middle Bronze '2' = RS 2/2 = UM 2 = Middle Minoan 2
Stratum 6	1750–1650 BC	Middle Bronze '3' = RS 2/3 = UM 2
Lacuna	1650–1550 BC	No occupation
Stratum 5	1550–1450 BC	Late Bronze 1 = RS 1/1 = UR 1
Stratum 4	1450–1365 BC	Late Bronze 1-2 = RS 1/2 = UR2
Stratum 3	1365–1200 BC	Late Bronze 2 = RS 1/3 = UR 3
Stratum 2	1200–1100 BC	Iron Age
Lacuna	900–600 BC	No occupation
Strata 1	500–300 BC	Helenistic up thru Arabi

A number of areas lay within the fortifications of Ugarit. In the northwest section was an acropolis with the temples of Dagon and Baal, excavated between 1929 and 1937. In the west was the Royal Zone, including the Royal Palace. A fortress protecting the latter area was excavated, with the earliest elements dating back to the Middle Bronze Age. To the west of that lies the modern village of Ras Shamra. There were densely populated residential areas to the east of the Royal Zone and on the southern slope of the tell.

Excavation has now resumed in the Latakia region under a joint Syrian-Italian mission team, at Tell Semhane.

=== Cuneiform tablets ===
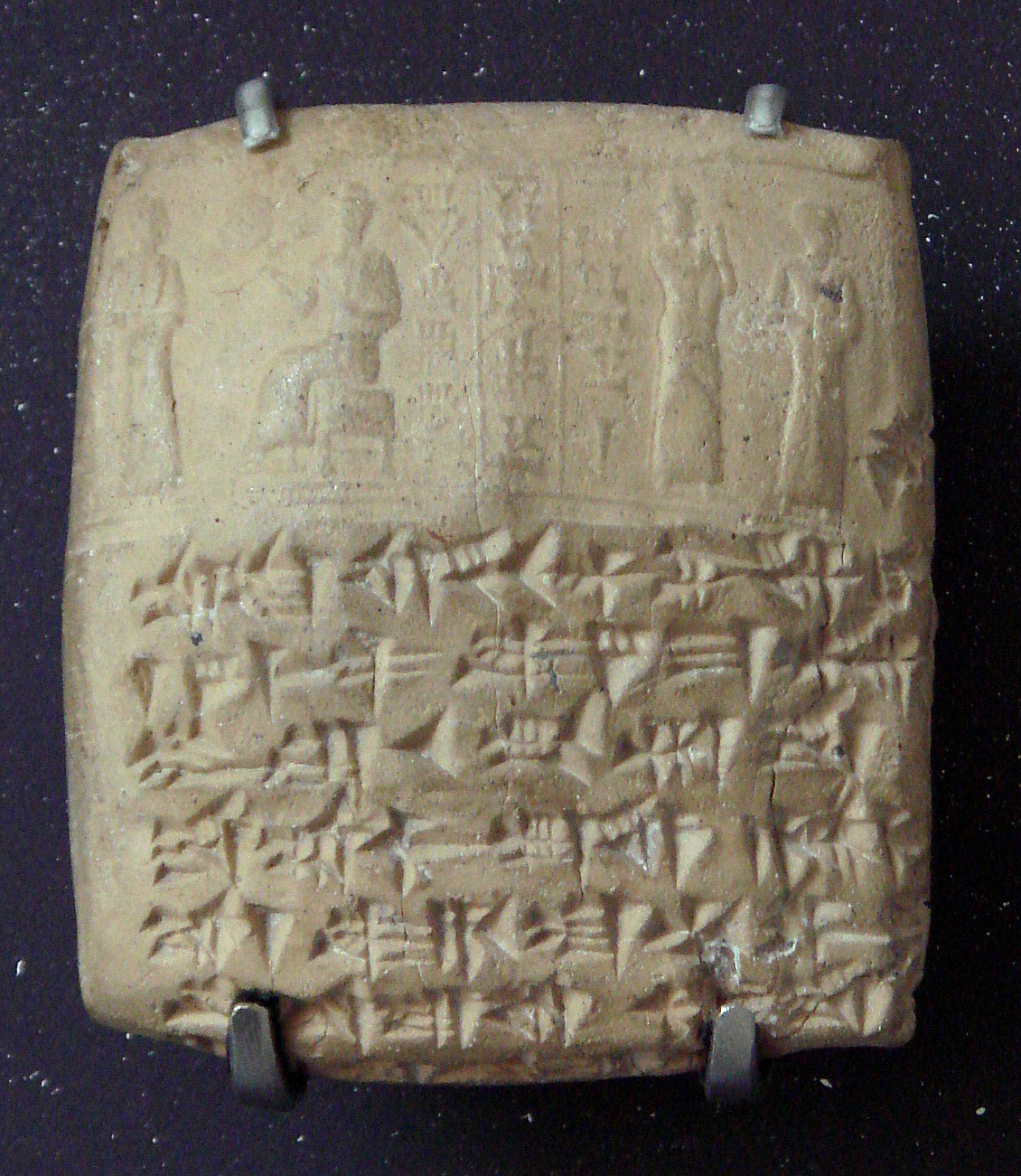
Text of Law in Akkadian by King Niqmepa with dynastic seal Ras Shamra Louvre Museum

Several thousand cuneiform tablets have been found. By the Late Bronze Age Ugarit had a thriving dual-scribal system. Primarily it used the East Semitic Akkadian language which acted as the lingua franca throughout the region for diplomacy, business, and administrative purposes. Other languages were also used "including Sumerian, Hittite, Hurrian, Egyptian, Cypro-Minoan, Phoenician, and Luwian". In parallel, there was scribal activity in the local Northwest Semitic Ugaritic language. A few scribes are known to have worked in both writing systems. A number of archives were found, the largest being that of the household of Urtēnu, a merchant with trading ties as far afield as Emar. This area of the tell was under military control at the time and about 100 tablets were found in the rubble from military construction. Later excavation found several hundred tablets in the actual home. One tablet mentions the enthronement of Kassite ruler Kadashman-Harbe II (c. 1223 BC) whose rule lasted less than a year, allowing a tight synchronism. The latest datable text was from the reign of Kassite ruler Meli-Shipak II (c. 1186 – c. 1172 BC) about the time of the destruction of Ugarit. An example of the archive involving one ton of copper:

Thus Kušmešuša, king of Alašiya, say to Niqmaddu, king of Ugarit, my son. All is well with me, my households, my countries, my wives, my sons, my troops, my horses and my chariots.… In exchange of the gift which you had sent me, I sent to you thirty-three (ingots of) copper; their weight is thirty talents and six-thousand and five-hundred shekels.

One small tablet written in Cypro-Minoan was found on the surface of the tell. While it traditionally has been assumed that syllabic texts are in the Akkadian language and alphabetic texts are in Ugaritic it has been suggested that much of the syllabic writing, especially in administrative documents, is actually in "a jargon where an Akkadian dialect is hard to detect given the great amount of Ugaritic elements it contained".

=== Royal palace ===
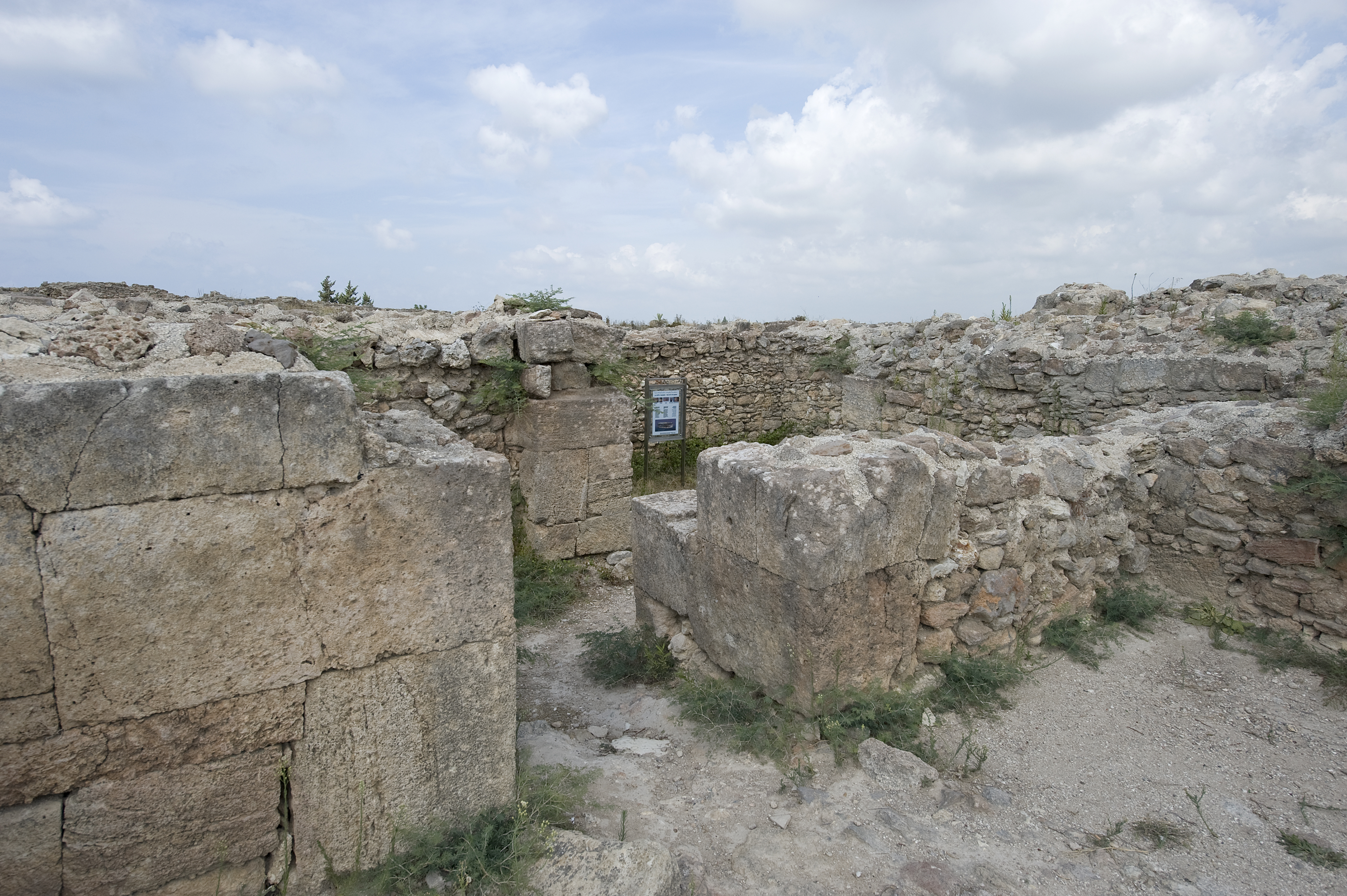
Ugarit Royal Palace archives space

The Royal Palace was constructed over several major phases between the 15th and 13th centuries BC. It comprised rooms arranged around courtyards, encompassing 6,500 square meters before the city's destruction in the early 12th century BC. A tablet from the 14th century BC found in the Amarna archives, EA 89, Rib-Hadda of Byblos likening the palace at Tyre to the grandeur found in the palace within Ugarit's walls. The palace was well constructed, predominantly crafted from stone, with preserved ashlar blocks reaching heights of up to 4 meters. Wooden crossbeams were also incorporated, inserted into slots within the stone masonry. A thick layer of plain plaster covered the walls. To the west of the palace was a set aside 10,000 square meter Royal Zone.

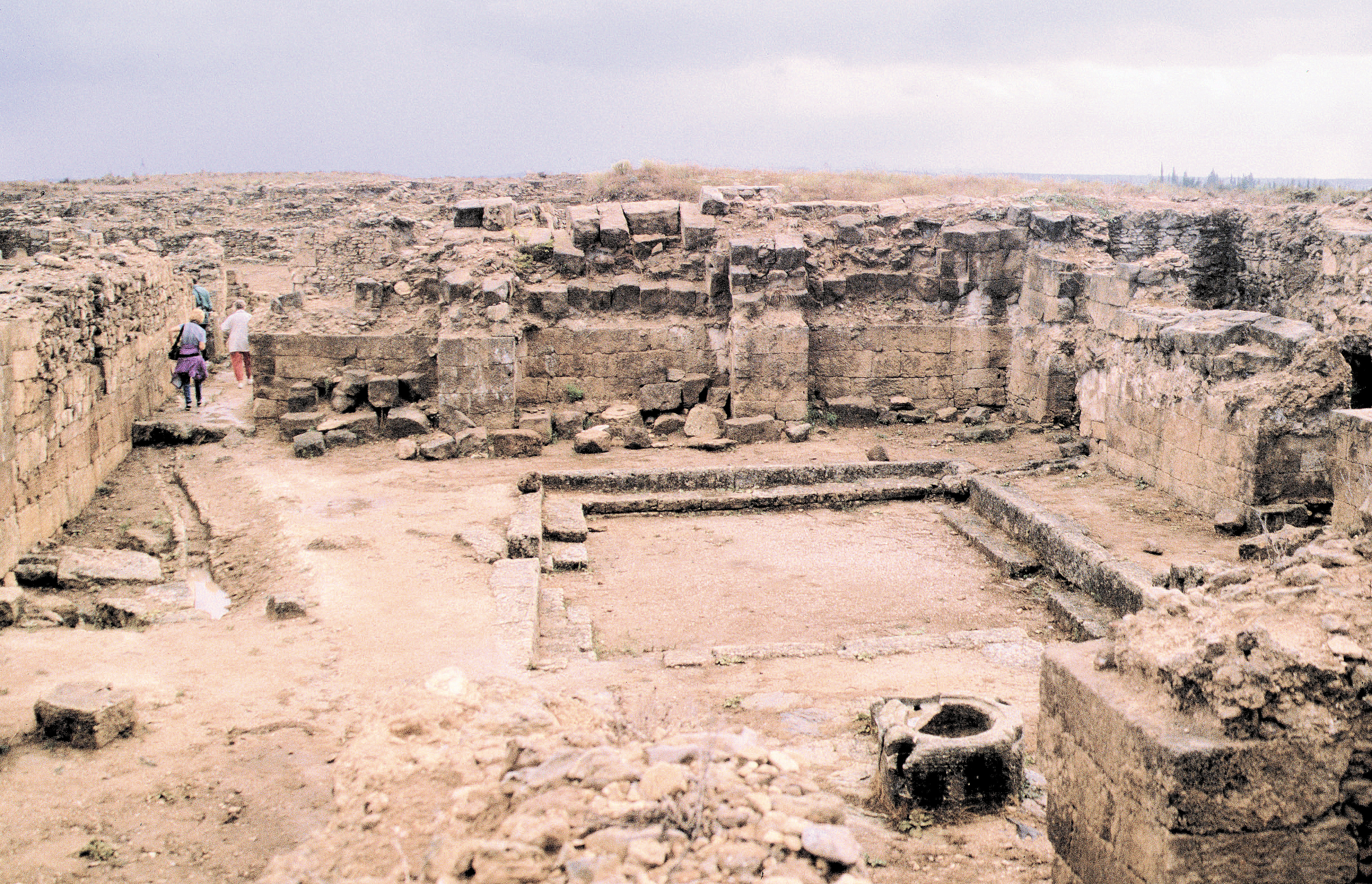
Ugarit Royal Palace reception hall

Archaeological findings within the ruins have included a variety of artifacts including ivory carvings, stone stele, figurines, and numerous tablets. These tablets were discovered in archives located across the palace; their contents encompass reports on outlying regions, judicial records—particularly from the south-central archives of the palace—and examples of practice writing by young scribes. Below ground, beneath two northern rooms, lay family tombs—three large chambers constructed with corbelled vaults—found devoid of any contents. The vanished upper floor likely accommodated the private quarters of the royal family, accessed via twelve staircases.

=== Acropolis ===
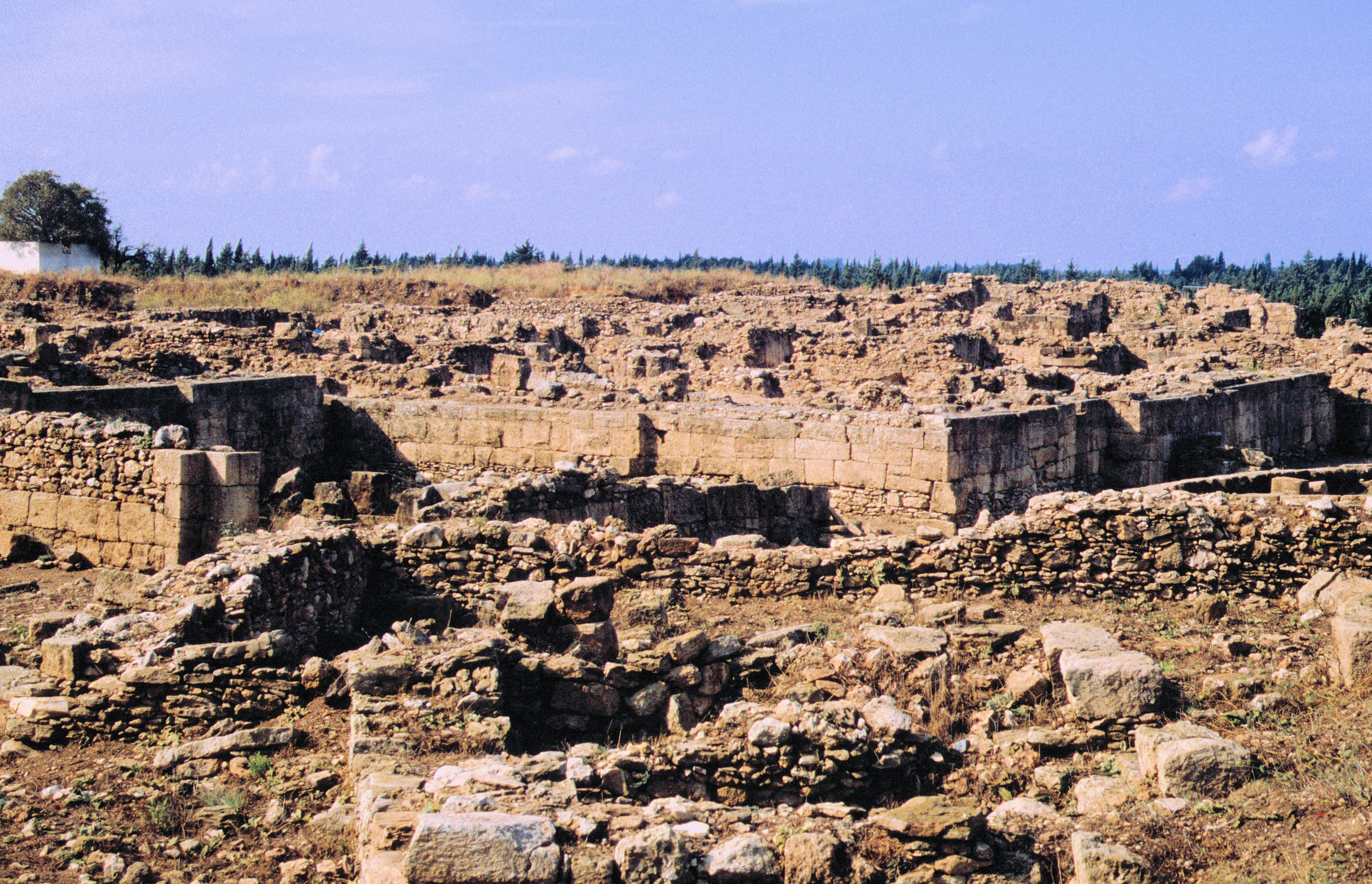
Ugarit

The Acropolis, positioned in the Ugarit's northeastern section, housed the city's primary temples dedicated to Baal and his father, Dagan. Though the existing remnants date to the Late Bronze Age, these temples might have their origins in the Middle Bronze Age. For instance, an arrangement of mortised stone blocks, similar to the Temple of the Obelisks in Byblos was found under ground level in the southeastern courtyard of the Temple of Dagan, hinting at a cultic installation from the Middle Bronze Age, before the construction of the temple structure. Objects found in the fill of the pronaos foundations, such as 9 crescent-shaped alabaster dagger pommels, were dated to the Middle Bronze Age as well. Stelae discovered in this area portray or name these gods, affirming their identification for the respective cults. Within the Temple of Baal, discoveries include the Baal with Thunderbolt depicting Baal holding a club aloft, portrayed in a typical Near Eastern and Egyptian artistic style as well as a stela bearing a dedication to Baal of Sapan. Numerous statues, stelai—some offered by Egyptians—and sixteen stone anchors were found as votive offerings in this vicinity. Three steles were found within the Temple of Dagan complex, all dating to the end of the Late Bronze Age. Two were dedicated to Dagan, and the remaining one bore an astral symbol.

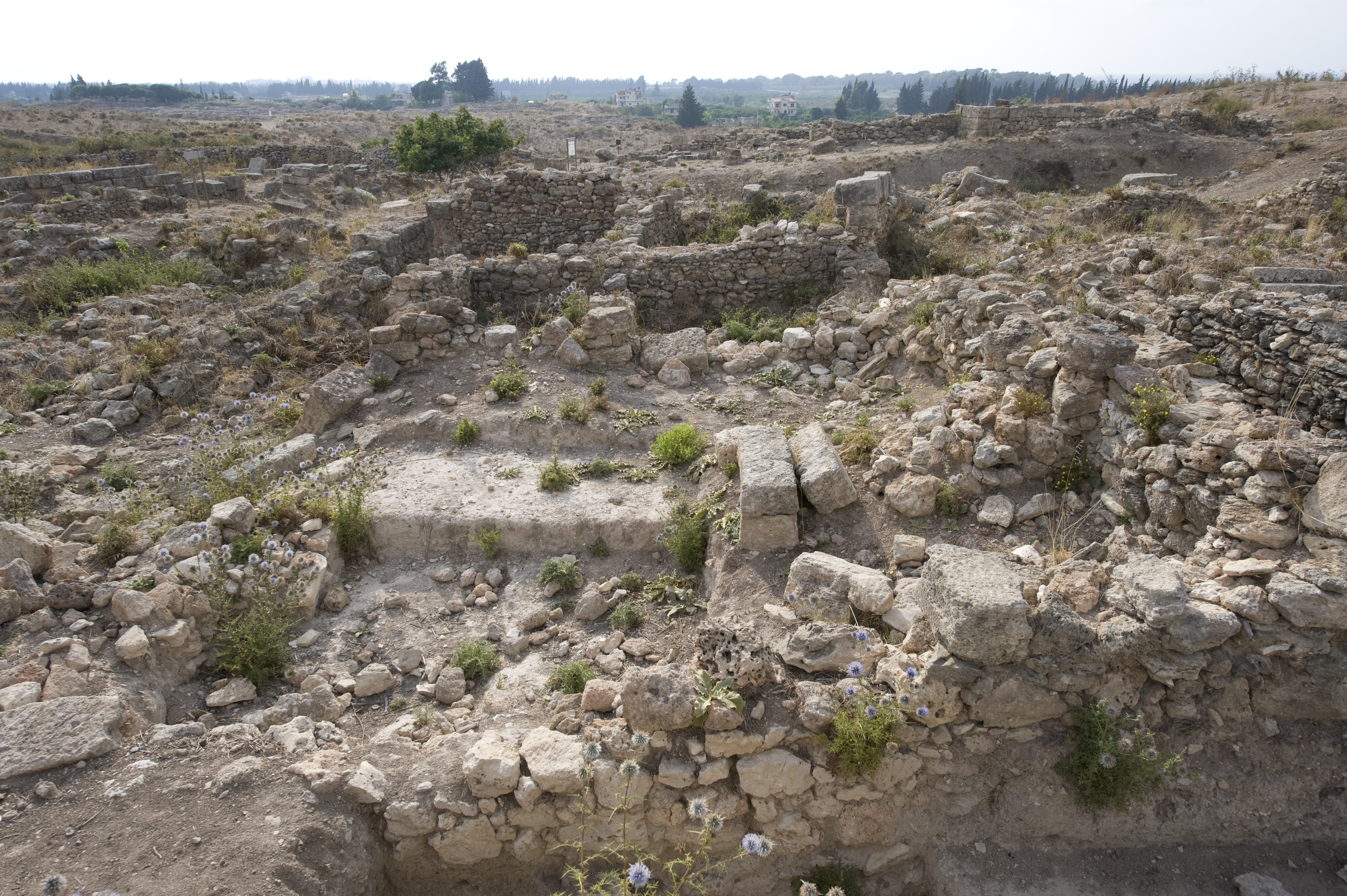
Dagon temple

Both temples are composed of a pronaos (porch) and a naos (sanctuary proper), aligned from north-northeast to south-southwest. The foundation walls of the Temple of Dagan were thickest on the north side of the naos, measuring at 4.4 metres. It is proposed this is to support a stairway and a sacrificial site on the terrace. A stone glacis wall with a rubble-and-earth core lined the western exterior of the naos. Walls enclosed an open area to the south of the temple, encompassing a courtyard where the aforementioned mortised blocks were buried. It is possible, though far from conclusive, that the courtyard contained an open-air altar or served a similar ritualistic purpose while the temple was in use. There were two entrances, a monumental gate to the south, and a rectangular annex to the southwest of the enclosure, with two doors connecting the outside to the courtyard. Remnants of the Temple of Baal encompass sections of an enclosing wall, a likely courtyard altar, monumental steps leading to the elevated pronaos and naos, and another presumed altar within the naos. The temple was destroyed, possibly by an earthquake, in the mid 13th century and not rebuilt. The Temple of Dagan was also destroyed at that time but was rebuilt.

Another significant structure within the Acropolis was the House of the High Priest, situated west of the Temple of Dagan. This large, two-story residence, largely well-constructed, contained tablets containing mythological poems. Some tablets demonstrated writing exercises and included syllabic and bilingual lexicons, implying the building's use as a center for scribe training. Its proximity to the primary temples and the discovery of bronze tools, particularly four small adzes and a dedicated hoe, hints at its potential role as the residence of the city's chief priest. Among a cache of seventy-four bronze items uncovered beneath a doorway threshold inside the house, was an elegant tripod adorned with pomegranate-shaped pendants.

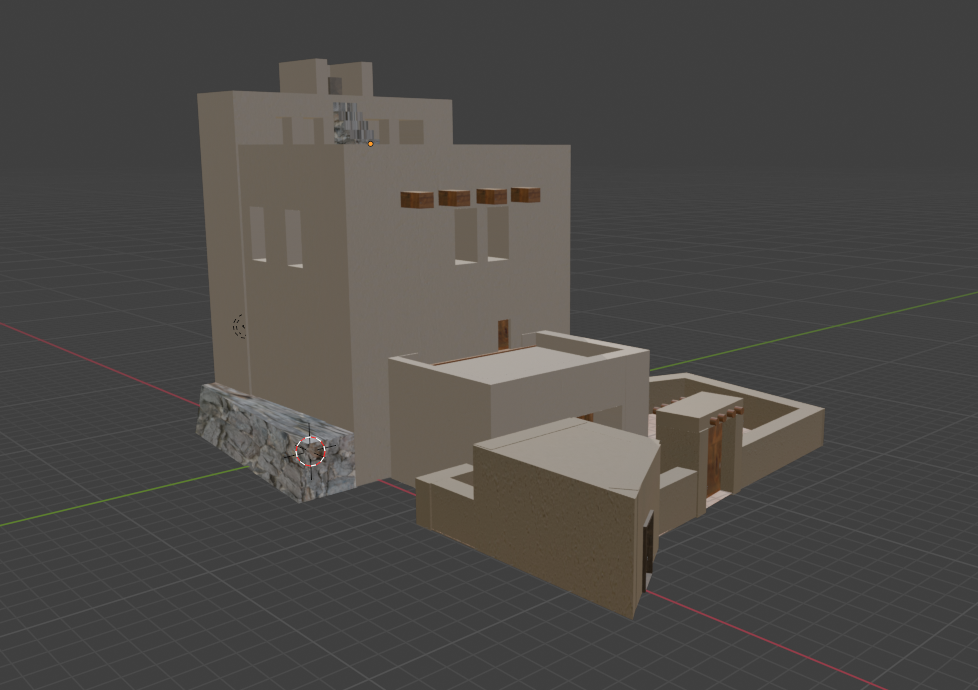
a 3D reconstruction of the Temple of Dagan

Since the abandonment of Ugarit, the Acropolis had seen destruction from looting and its use as a quarry for nearby settlements. This has caused the erasure of surface and buried site remains, such as in the Temple of Dagan, where the entire southwest corner of the pronaos had been dug out in a large pit likely dating to the 6th and 5th centuries BC.

=== The House of Alabaster Vessels ===
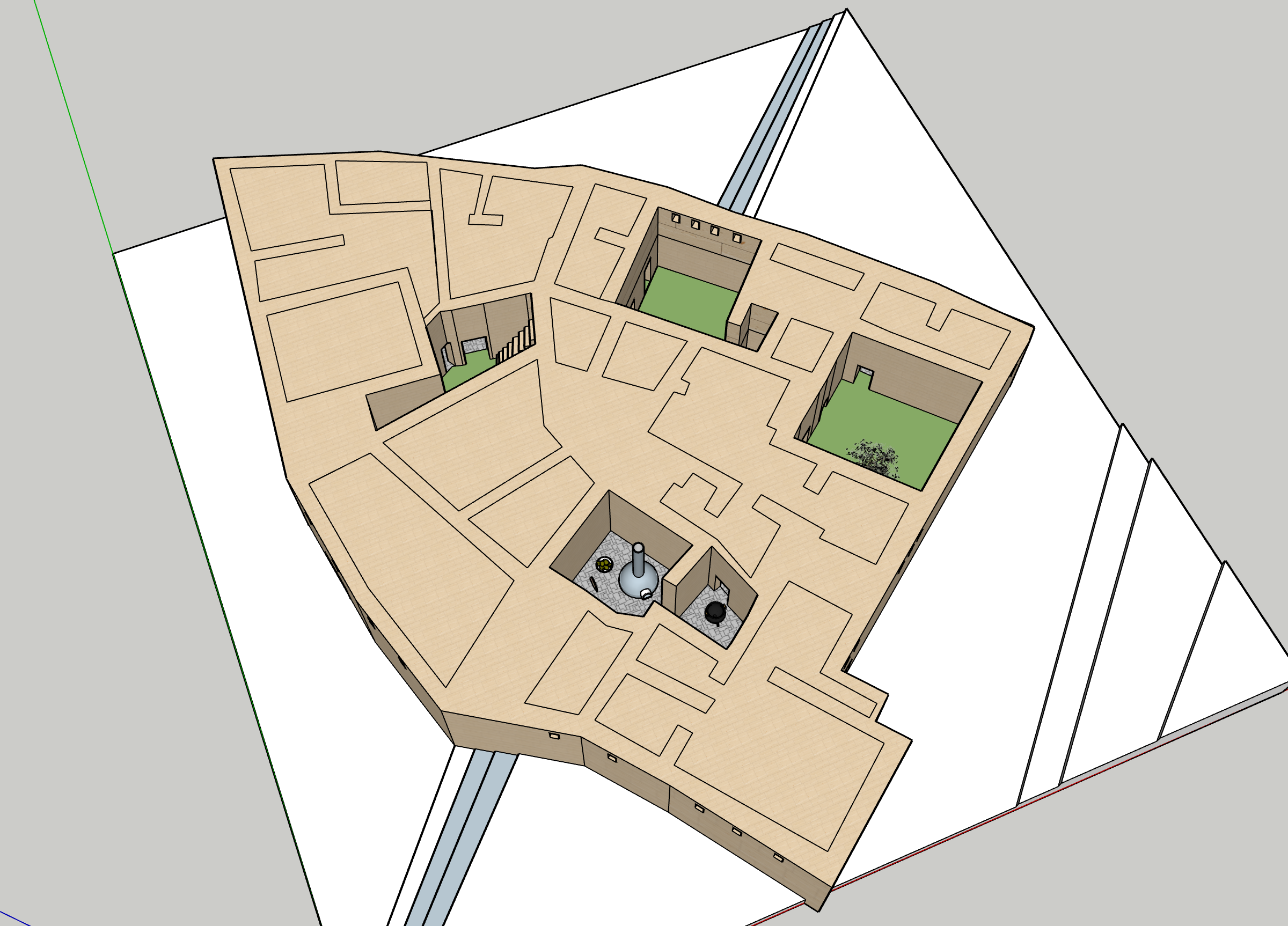
3D reconstruction of The House of Alabaster Vessels

The House of Alabaster Vessels (French: Maison aux Albâtres) is named after the alabaster vessels found during the excavation of the complex. It is located in the residential quarter of Ugarit to the east of the royal palace, a location where high officials reside. The complex is a large, two-story structure primarily serving residential purposes. Its triangular shape features sides measuring approximately 45 m to the east, 30 m to the south, and 50 m to the west. Located on a steep slope, the complex is divided into higher and lower sections. Originally, the house functioned as a single architectural unit engaged in human activities through several phases; in its final phase, archaeological evidence suggested that the complex had been divided into several individual houses.

A significant amount of material with Egyptian characteristics was found during excavation, including scarab imprints and sphinx beads. Archaeological findings in the ruins and the location of the structure suggest that the house was occupied by Egyptians residing in Ugarit, and the occupants likely held a high social status.

The upper level of the structure has collapsed, the only evidence indicating the existence of a second floor is a stone staircase discovered on-site . The feature is constructed similarly to other structures discovered in Ugarit, with courtyards and tombs incorporated into the house. Archaeological finds suggest that the structure includes rooms designated for residential use, such as a kitchen and a bathroom on the lower floor, as well as rooms serving industrial purposes; pierced stone slabs and jars for liquid production were found during the excavation of the lower floor.

=== Ras Ibn Hani and Minet el Beida ===
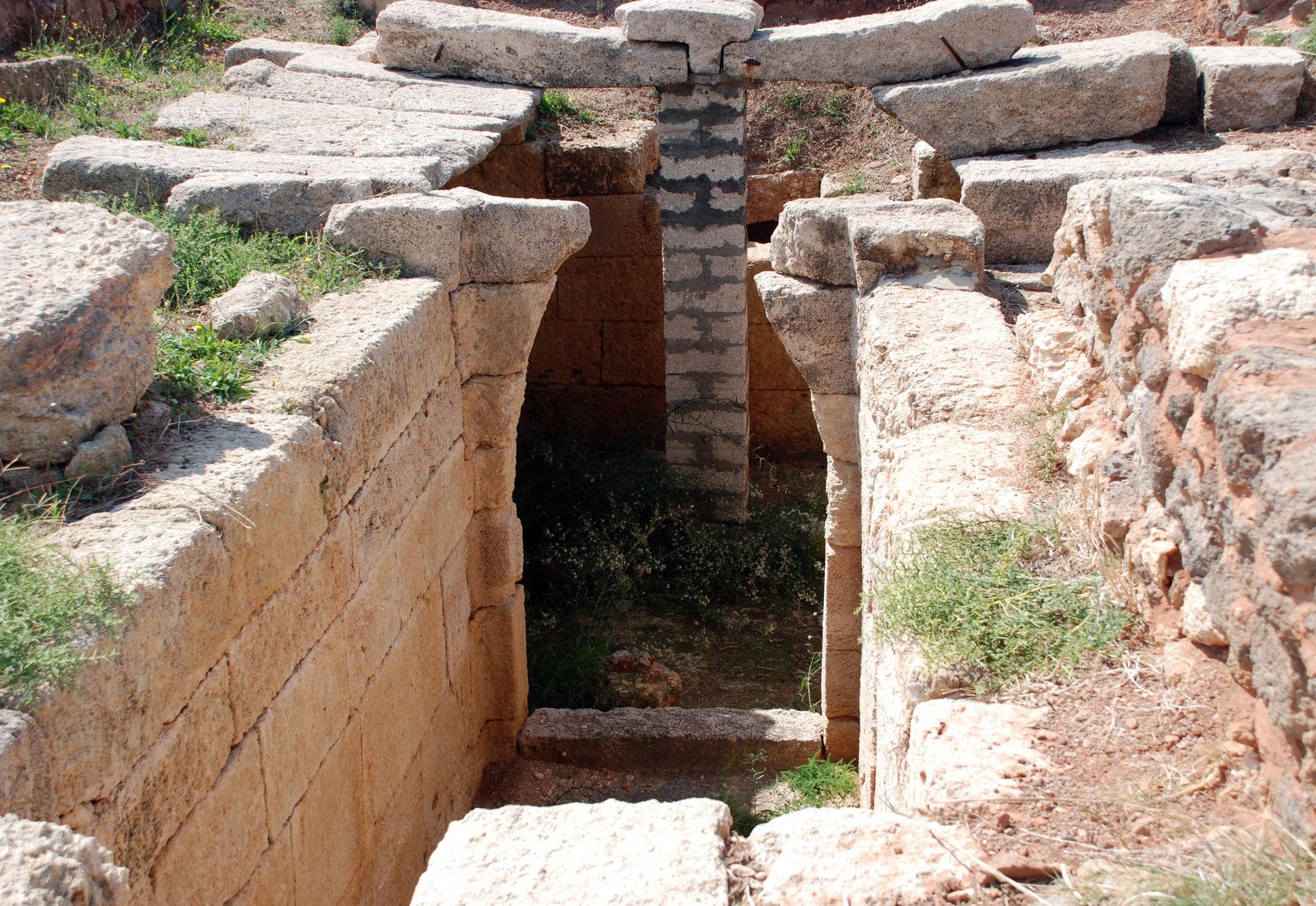
Ras Ibn Hani, tomb in north palace

Two other sites within the city of Ugarit, Ras Ibn Hani and Minet el Beida, have also been excavated. Ras Ibn Hani, on a promontory overlooking the Mediterranean 5 kilometers south of the city, was discovered during commercial construction in 1977. Salvage excavation occurred in 1977 followed by regular excavation which has continued to the present by a Syrian-French team led by A. Bounni and J. Lagarce. Occupation began in the mid-13th century BC. Abandoned along with Ugarit, it was re-occupied in the Hellenistic period, including the construction of a defensive fortress. A "royal palace", elite housing, and tombs were found. About 169 cuneiform tablets, most in the Ugaritic language, were also found.

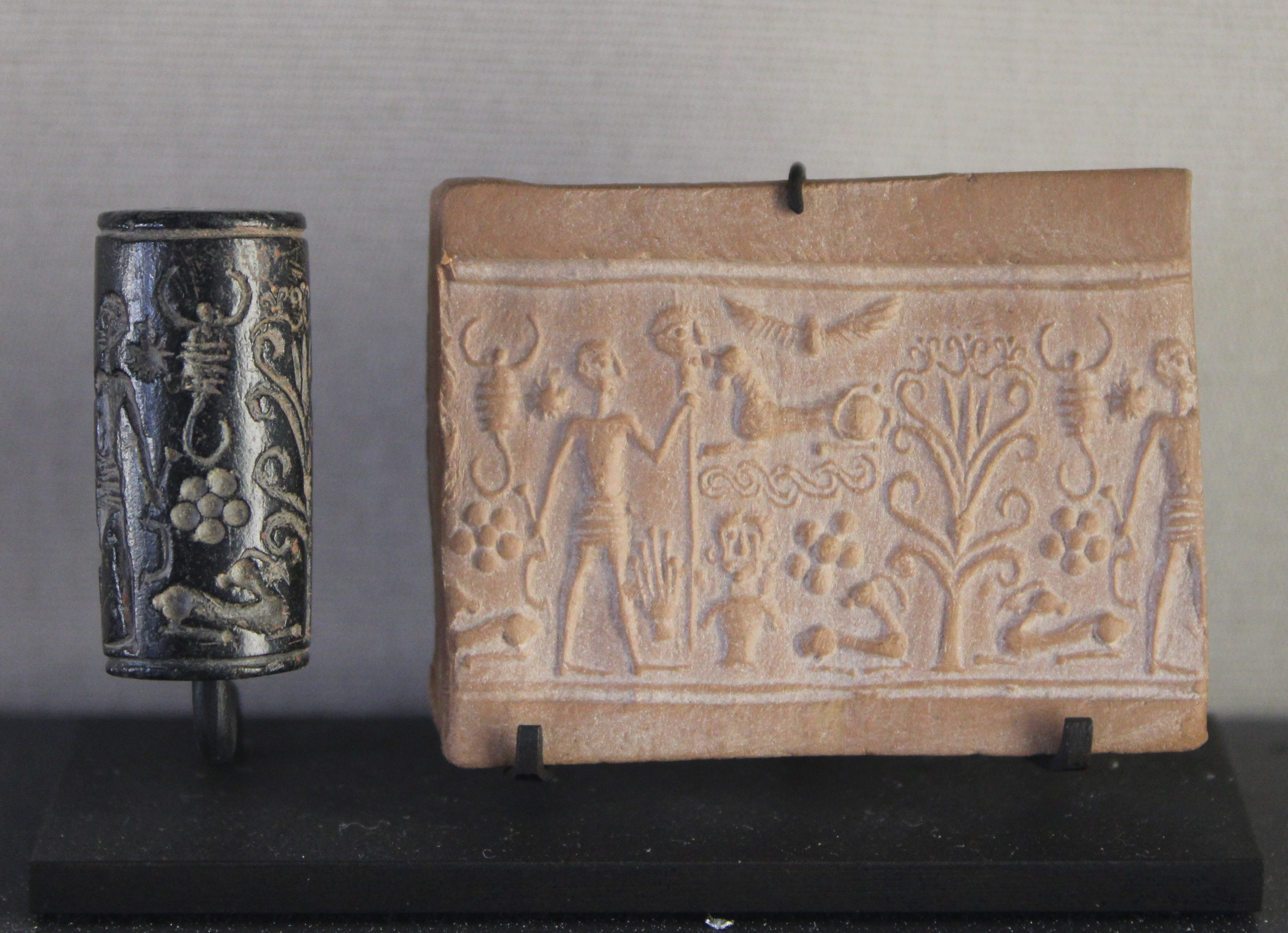
Cylinder seal, steatite, representing a warrior holding a head stuck on a pike, and various figures: winged disc, lioness, twist, bust of a man, globules, caprids around a tree, hand, etc. From Minet el-Beida

One of the two ports of ancient Ugarit (the other, Ra’šu, is unlocated but suggested to be Ras Ibn Hani) was located 1.5 kilometers west of the main city, at the natural harbor of Minet el Beida (Arabic for "White Harbor"). The 28 hectare site was excavated between 1929 and 1935 by Claude Schaeffer. The site is currently a military port and unavailable for excavation. Its name in the Late Bronze Age is believed to have been Maʾḫadu. Archaeological excavations carried out on the southern side of the bay, now reduced in size due to alluvial fill, unveiled remnants of a settlement established in the 14th century BC, and perhaps earlier, in the late 15th century. This port town, featuring an urban layout akin to the city of Ugarit, displays irregular street formations. Dwellings were structured around courtyards with adjacent rooms, including provisions like wells, ovens, and occasionally subterranean tombs. Besides residential spaces and shrines, warehouses were present for storing diverse goods earmarked for import or export. One of them was discovered still housing eighty shipping jars that remain remarkably intact.

Artifacts discovered in the port indicate the predominance of native Ugaritians within the local populace, accompanied by a significant presence of various foreign communities such as Egyptians, Cypriots, Hittites, Hurrians, and Aegean peoples. Among the discoveries were Cypriot pottery (both imported and locally crafted), Mycenaean pottery, ivory cosmetic containers from Egypt, a terracotta depiction of Hathor, bronze tools and weaponry, cylinder seals, stone weights, remnants of banded dye-murex shells used in the production of purple dye, and inscribed tablets.

The site is thought to have been largely evacuated before it was burned (resulting in a thick ash layer) and destroyed as few valuables were found in the residences or in the southern palace. About 130 cuneiform tablets were found in the northern palace. After the destruction the site was occupied by simple residences, termed a village by the excavators. Aegean style pottery and loom weights were found in this Iron Age I level.

=== The Temple of Rhyton ===
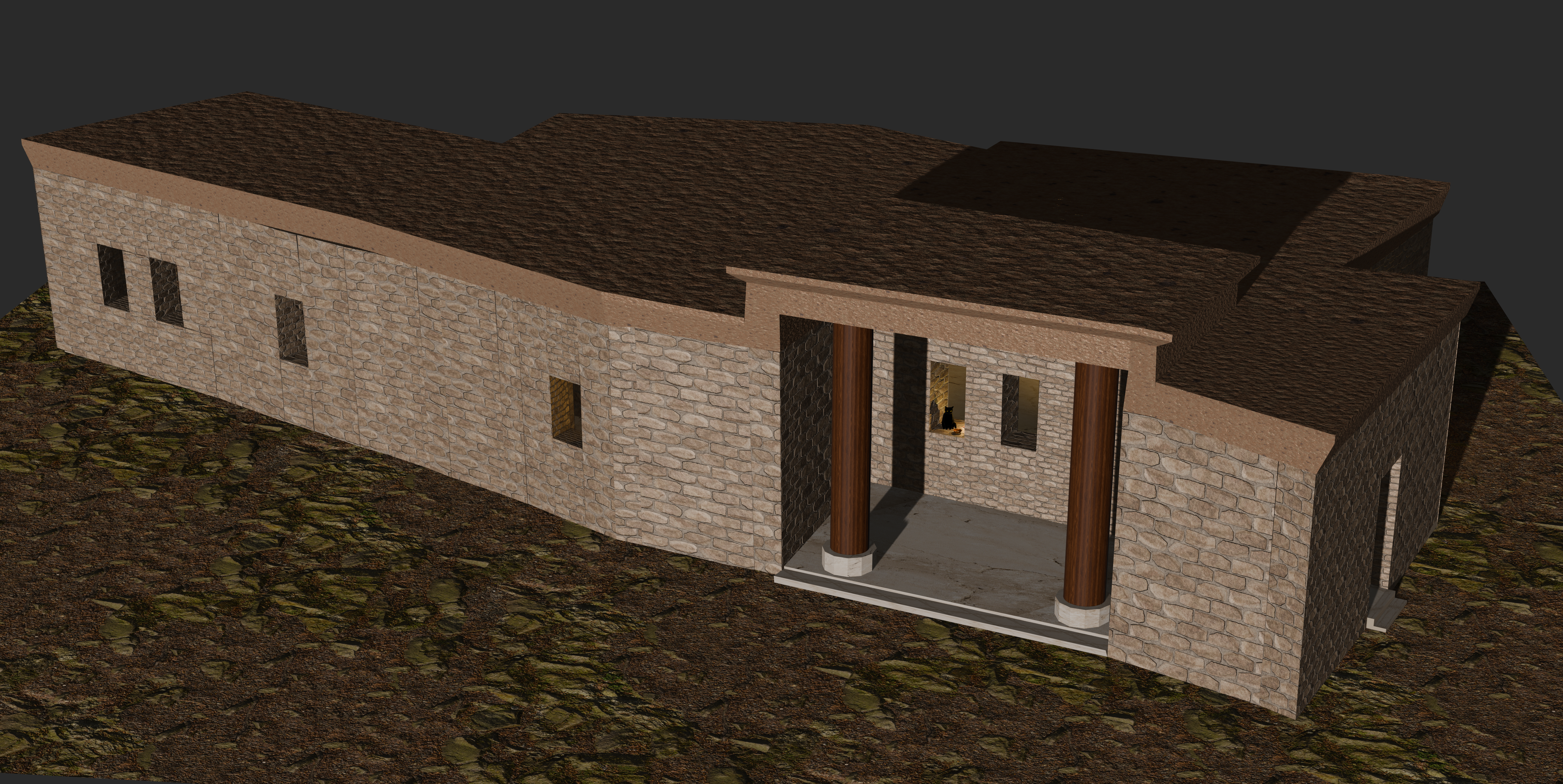
3D digital reconstruction of the Temple of Rhyton in Blender

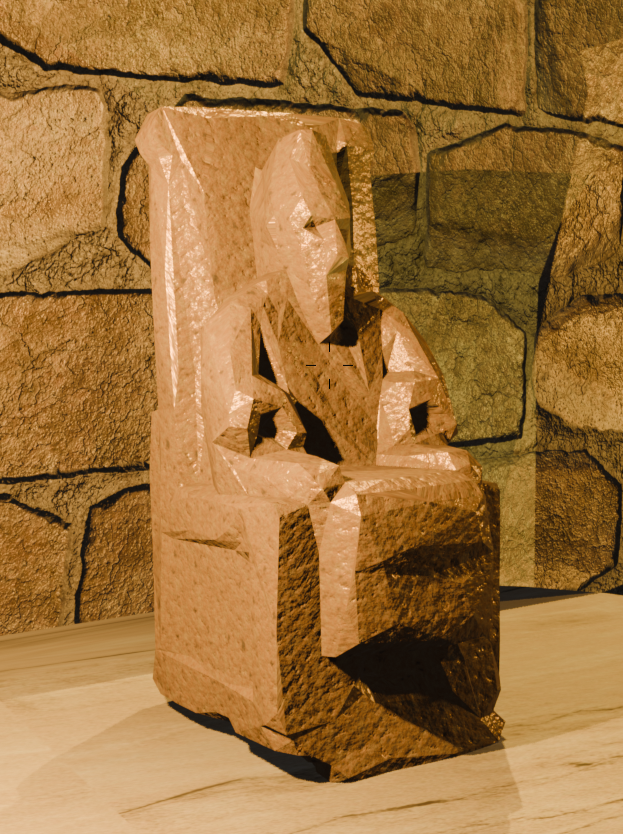
3D digital reconstruction of the statue of El

Located right in the city centre of Ugarit is a Late Bronze Age cult complex named the Temple of the Rhyton. It is likely named after the large amount of rhytons (ceremonial drinking vessels for libation) discovered in its vicinity. Some scholars, however, have argued that the complex should be identified as the Temple of El, the head of the Ugaritic pantheon, on the basis of a limestone cult statue thought to represent this deity. The figure depicts an older, bearded figure seated on a high-backed throne, wearing a high crown and a long garment. The location of the Temple is noteworthy as it is in the middle of a residential area, rather than as standalone monument. Its main sanctuary is connected with the adjacent residences. The oil press to the north, accessible by the same street, is believed to be an industrial unit providing financial support and belonging to the complex, highlighting the extent of socioeconomic and religious integration in the lives of the Ugaritic people.

Architecturally, the building material is dune calcarenite. The complex consists of a two‑columned portico facing northeast leading indirectly through a corridor into a main hall with benches and a stepped platform or altar. The hall is rectangular in plan and measures approximately 6 × 7 metres. A set of small rooms attached to the hall in the northeast likely served as sacristy, annexes or storage for offerings. The building's access from the street is exceptional due to the U-shape turn from the vestibule or two other indirect doors. In addition to the cultic function, the Temple has also been identified as a site for Marzēah, a Levantine communal celebration in honour of a certain deity, including El. The bouquets are described as indulgent and abundant, accompanied by wine and music, and often descending into excess. Locations interpreted as a venue for Marzēah shared the features of benches along the wall, large rectangular rooms and side rooms for food storage.

== Iconography ==
There are multiple types of Ugaritic Iconography, divided into classifications such as, stone sculptures, metal work, ivories, glyptics, and ceramics.

=== Stone Work ===
While stone statue sculptures primarily exhibit Egyptian influence in its statues (MBA), statues such as the 25 cm long calcite statue of El found in the Temple of Rhyton do not have political influence. Stone stelae, another type of iconographic stone work present in Ugarit, carries primarily local, Egyptian, and Anatolian elements. With one of its most known pieces, the stele of "Baal With Thunderbolt" (a limestone stela with a Height 142 cm, Width 50 cm, and a Diameter of 28 cm), showing a young man striding, clothed in a line cloth, wielding a club menacingly. Some other notable stelae include: "The stele of Mami dedicated to Baal of Saphon" and "Stele with dedication to the God Dagan".

=== Metal Work ===
Metal work in Ugaritic iconographies shown advanced metallurgy in some works and heavy Egyptian influence present. There is also an exceedingly greater amount of metal works compared to the stone works present, though many have been lost by later looting for smelting. Iconographic Metal Images of Deities primarily have 3 groups in the Syria-Palestine region, that being warrior figures, standing peaceful figures and seating peaceful figures, with archaeological examples such as "the statue of the God El", made of bronze and gold with Egyptian-local influences, shows a statue of the type of "a seated peaceful one" (Damascus Museum). Some other influential metal working object of the city state are a bowl found in a Baal temple, which reflect Egyptian and Aegean influences.

=== Ivories ===
Excavations in Tell Ras Shamra have shown that Ugarit hosts the greatest collection of late Bronze Age Syrian Ivories, which reflect Aegean, Egyptian, Hittite, and local influences. With the ivories matching cosmetic boxes, beds, and chairs of the time. With the greatest piece of Ivory being of 16 narratives known as the "Bed Pannel of Carved Ivory", with a height of 50 cm and a width of 100 cm, shows Egyptian influences, (e.g. using furniture types of Tut-Ankh-Amun. Another Ivory piece being a head of a young man (or god) in Ivory, but gender is debated as other archaeologists say it is the face of a woman or goddess.

=== Glyptics and Ceramics ===
Glyptics, or cylinder seals, scarabs, impressions, and seal rings, were found to be of Hyksos and Hittite influence, and the types of glyptics being decorative, religious, or royal. Glyptics such as "a modern impression of a Cypriot cylinder seals", with a height of 2 cm, and a diameter of 1.2 cm, of soapstone, shows Aegean influence and how iconographic imports were found in Ugarit. Ceramics on the other hand, present local styles, with imported Aegean pottery as well. Some ceramics include a mug of a priest depicting Baal serving the seated El, which may reflect Egyptian influences, and a decorated "terracotta" found in the temple of rhythons, which depict a priest praying with an Egyptian like sun god.

== See also ==
- Asherah
- Cities of the ancient Near East
- List of Ugaritic deities
- Short chronology timeline
- Ugaritic Vintage Rites
