= Ammittamru II =

Ruler of Ugarit

Ammistamru II
- King of Ugarit

King of Ugarit
- Reign: 1230s BC
- Predecessor: Niqmepa
- Successor: Ibiranu
- Died: c. 12xx BC; Ugarit
- Spouse: Piddu daughter of Bentesina, granddaughter of Hattusili III
- Issue: Ibiranu
- Father: Niqmepa
- Mother: Ahatmilku

Ammittamru II (also Ammistramru II) was a king of the ancient Syrian city of Ugarit who ruled from 1260 to 1235 BC. He reigned for 25 years, being the son of former king Niqmepa, who was famously forced to sign a treaty of vassalization to the Hittites.

== Reign ==
Like all other Ugaritan kings, very few references of him exist. Ammittamru II is assumed to have used the seal of his grandfather, Niqmaddu II instead of the dynastic seal that reads: "Yaqarum, son of Niqmaddu, king of Ugarit", that was normally used by Ugaritan kings. He was a vassal king of the Hittite great kings Hattusili III and Tudhaliya IV.

=== Accession ===
His mother Ahatmilku supported his succession to the throne after the death of his father. She banished two of her sons to Alashiya (Cyprus), when they contested this, but made sure they had sufficient supplies.

=== Marriage ===
Ammittamru II married Piddu, daughter of Bentešina of Amurru to the south, and born to Kiluš-Ḫepa, daughter of Ḫattušili III.

=== Divorce ===
He later expelled his wife after she had committed serious misconduct and sent her back to Amurru. He then demanded her extradition in order to punish her for her deeds. Šaušgamuwa of Amurru (her brother) refused to extradite the lady because he feared her execution. As tension arose between the two vassals, the Hittite great king Tudḫaliya IV of Hatti interfered in the matter, as an escalating conflict between two important vassals would not have been in his favor. Then the Hittite viceroy Ini-Teššup of Carchemish decided that the ex-wife would have to be extradited and Šaušgamuwa should be paid 1400 shekels of gold to in return.

=== Succession ===
Ammittamru II determined his son Ibiranu as his successor during his lifetime.

Preceded by Niqmepa	King of Ugarit	Succeeded by Ibiranu
