= Ammurapi =

King of Ugarit
- Reign: 1215-1190/1180 BC
- Predecessor: Niqmaddu III
- Born: Ugarit

Ammurapi (Ugaritic: 𐎓𐎎𐎗𐎔𐎛, romanized: ʿAmmurāpʾi; Hittite: 𒄠𒈬𒊏𒁉, romanized: Ammurapi) was the last Bronze Age ruler and king (c. 1215 to 1180 BC) of the ancient Syrian city of Ugarit. Ammurapi was a contemporary of the Hittite King Suppiluliuma II.

== Reign ==
The King of Alashiya (Cyprus) wrote to Ammurapi enquiring about enemy ships: "You wrote to me the following 'the ships of the enemy were seen in the sea. If so, be careful.'" Subsequently, Ammurapi confirmed:

My father behold, the enemy's ships came (here); my cities(?) were burned, and they did evil things in my country. Does not my father know that all my troops and chariots(?) are in the Land of Hatti, and all my ships are in the Land of Lukka?...Thus, the country is abandoned to itself. May my father know it: the seven ships of the enemy that came here inflicted much damage upon us.

This letter dramatically highlights the desperate situation facing Ugarit while it was also under attack by the invading Sea Peoples.

=== Egyptian relations ===
In the reign of the pharaoh Merneptah, a King of Ugarit (possibly Ammurapi or his predecessor Niqmaddu III) wrote to Egypt, requesting a sculptor for their city, to "make an image of Merneptah in front of the statue of Ba’al in his (renovated) temple in Ugarit." The pharaoh delayed or declined this request, but sent gifts including textiles, ebony wood, plaques of coloured stones, and ropes. This letter, and others from the same period, may reflect a renewal of ties between Ugarit and Egypt, as Hittite influence waned in Syria.

- RS 88.2158. During the reign of Seti II (?), Ammurapi requested help during famine writing: "In the land of Ugarit there is a severe hunger. May my Lord save it, and may the king give grain to save my life…and to save the citizens of the land of Ugarit".

=== Divorce ===
Suppiluliuma II was responsible for the divorce settlement between Ammurapi and a Hittite woman, but it did not cause a problem between the Kingdom of Ugarit and the Hittite Empire; instead it demonstrated the relationship between both kingdoms.

=== Bronze Age Collapse ===
Ammurapi is the last known ruler of Ugarit. The city may have been destroyed around 1192-1190 BC. Ugarit would become one of the many states of the ancient Near East that were destroyed or abandoned during the Bronze Age collapse.

== Attestations ==
=== Famine / grain-request correspondence ===
- RS 88.2158 — the letter to Egypt quoting "there is a severe hunger... may the king give grain"
- RS 18.038 — cited alongside 88.2158, 94.2530, 94.2523 as key dating evidence for Ammurapi's reign
- RS 94.2530 — Hittite request to Ammurapi for grain
- RS 94.2523 — a letter from Penti-Šarruma, a Hittite prince, complaining to Ammurapi about not receiving his share of lapis lazuli — also cited for grain matters by other authors, so it may cover more than one topic.
- RS 88.2011 — fragmentary, also concerns a grain demand

=== Sea Peoples / final invasion correspondence ===
- RS 18.147 — Ammurapi's own letter, written in response to a plea for assistance from the king of Alasiya, describing the enemy's ships burning his cities.
- RS 34.129 — from "the Great King" (presumably Suppiluliuma II) to the prefect of Ugarit, ordering that a man named Ibnadushu be sent for questioning because the king (Ammurapi) was too immature to respond.

=== Diplomatic/tribute correspondence with Hatti ===
- RS 34.136 (RSO 7, 7) — probably from Talmi-Tešub, king of Carchemish, to Ammurapi, reproaching him for sending unsuitable gifts to Hittite dignitaries.

=== Seals and administrative/legal texts ===
- RS 96.2042 — a clay tag from the House of Urtenu bearing Ammurapi's personal cylinder seal impression, inscribed "Seal of Ammurapi, king of Ugarit".
- RS 34.126 (RSO 7, 90) — funerary ritual text, cited in connection with settling the question of Niqmaddu III's queen (not directly about Ammurapi's marriage, but from the same succession dossier)

== Bibliography ==
- Bryce, Trevor (1998). "The Fall of the Kingdom and its Aftermath". The Kingdom of the Hittites. Oxford University Press. p. 367. ISBN 9780199240104.
