= Ibiranu =

King of Ugarit

- King of Ugarit

King of Ugarit
- Reign: c. 1230-1220s BC
- Predecessor: Ammittamru II
- Successor: Niqmaddu III
- Died: c. 1220s BC; Ugarit?

Ibiranu (reigned c. 1235 BC – c. 1225/20 BC) was the sixth king of Ugarit, a city-state in northwestern Syria.

Gordon (1956) suggested Ibiranu meant "horsemen" composed of ibr and the suffix -ân.

== Reign ==
Ibiranu was a contemporary with Tudhaliya IV of Hatti. Ibiranu’s decade on the throne highlights the waning coercive power of the late Hittite Empire over its Levantine vassals. His persistent delays, economic evasions, and diplomatic neglect exposed the growing friction between imperial demands and regional vassal autonomy, setting the stage for similar strained relations under his successor, Niqmaddu III.

=== Hittite relations ===
As a vassal state of Hatti the king was answerable to the viceroy at Carchemish.

- RS 17.247 (CTH 110 / Letter of Prince Piḫa-walwi): A reprimand sent by the Hittite official/prince Piḫa-walwi. In it, Piḫa-walwi scolds Ibiranu on behalf of the Great King: "Why have you not come before His Majesty since you have assumed the kingship... And why have you not sent your messengers? Now His Majesty is very angry..."
- RS 17.383: A letter from an Ugaritic ambassador stationed at Ḫattuša warning Ibiranu that the Hittite court was unsatisfied with the quality of gifts (specifically gems) he eventually sent, urging him to send lapis lazuli to appease the Great King.
- RS 17.59: A decree issued by Ini-Teššub, the Viceroy of Carchemish overseeing Syrian vassals, responding to Ibiranu's reluctance to send infantry and chariotry for imperial military expeditions. Ini-Teššub ultimately permitted Ibiranu to pay a heavy financial exemption tax in lieu of troop deployment.
