= Cote d'Azur, Syria =

Beach resort near Latakia, Syria

Coordinates: 35°35′8″N 35°44′45″E

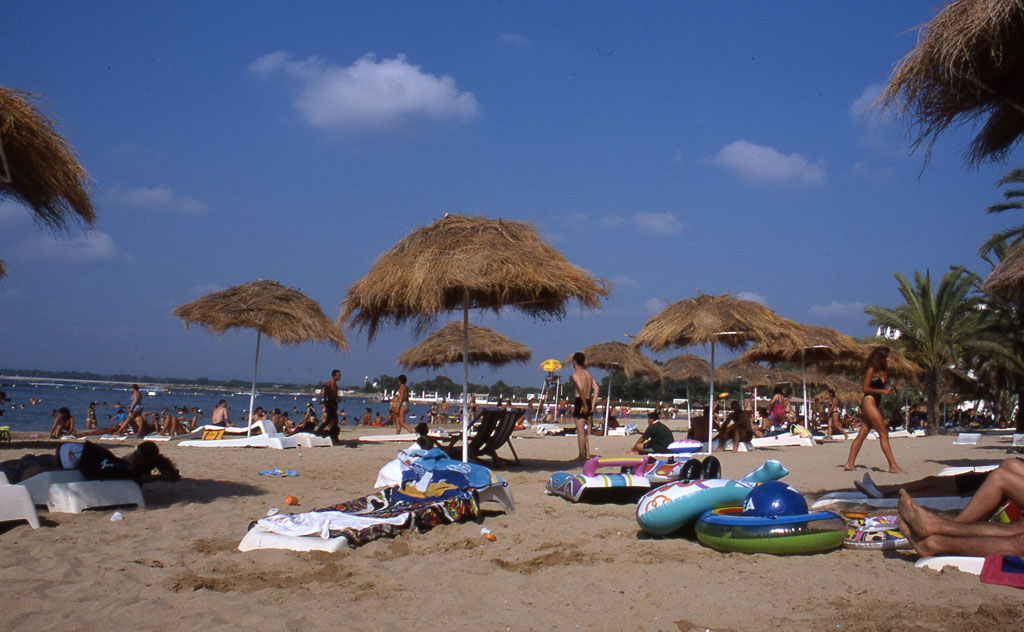
The Cote d'Azur beach

Cote d'Azur, known locally as the Blue Beach (الشّاطِئ الأزرَق al-Shāṭiʼ al-Azraq) is a beach resort located 8 kilometers (5.0 mi) north of Latakia, Syria along the Mediterranean coast, on a site of archaeological importance called Ras Ibn Hani. During the summer, the entire area is packed with Syrian families on holiday, as well as Gulf Arabs wishing to escape the heat of their own countries.

Known for its spotless sands and crystal clear blue water, the resort is considered to be one of the most cosmopolitan and westernized parts of the country, being the home to Latakia's five-star hotels as well as home to private holiday apartments and a campsite.

Aside from swimming, the resort also offers waterskiing, wind surfing and pedalos for hire, while the streets around the resort are lined with many shops selling inflatables, swim suits and souvenirs.
