= Claude Frédéric-Armand Schaeffer =

French archeologist

Claude Frédéric-Armand Schaeffer-Forrer (6 March 1898 – 25 August 1982) was a French archeologist.

== Biography ==
Born in Strasbourg, he led the French excavation team that began working on the site of Ugarit, the present day Ras Shamra in 1929, leading to the uncovering of the Ugaritic religious texts. After the Second World War he began excavating the Late Bronze Age site of Enkomi.

He was curator for the Prehistoric and Gallo-Roman Museum, Strasbourg (1924–1933) and for the Museum of National Antiquities, Saint-Germain-en-Laye (1933–1956). Schaeffer was an advocate of catastrophism. He argued that on at least five occasions catastrophic events (such as earthquakes) had destroyed Bronze Age civilizations.

He died in Saint-Germain-en-Laye on 25 August 1982.

== Selected publications ==
- The Cuneiform Texts of Ras Shamra-Ugarit (1939)
- Stratigraphie Comparee Et Chronologie De L Asie Occidentale (1948)
- Note Sur L'enceinte Mycénienne D'enkomi (Chypre) (1948)
