= Ahatmilku =

Princess of Amurru, Queen of Ugarit

Ahatmilku (fl. 1265 BCE) was a king's daughter from the Land of Amurru, who became king's wife of Niqmepa of Ugarit.

== Life ==
She was the daughter of DU-Teššup and sister of Duppi-Tessup of Amurru.

=== Marriage & Children ===
Ahatmilku was a wife of the King Niqmepa of Ugarit and daughter-in-law of Niqmaddu II. She held great wealth and influence.

She supported her youngest son Ammittamru II’s succession to the throne after the death of her husband. She banished two of her sons to Alashiya (Cyprus), when they contested this, but made sure they had sufficient supplies.
