= Duppi-Teššup =

Ruler of Amurru

Duppi-Teššup (c. 1310-1300 BCE; Duppi-Tessup) was the ruler of Amurru on the Akkar Plain, during the reign of Mursili II of Hatti.

== Family ==
He was the son of DU–Teššup and grandson of Aziru.

== Attestations ==
In Hittite sources, Duppi-Tessup is known from the reign of Mursili II.
