= Charles Higham (archaeologist) =

British-born New Zealand archaeologist

Charles Higham ONZM
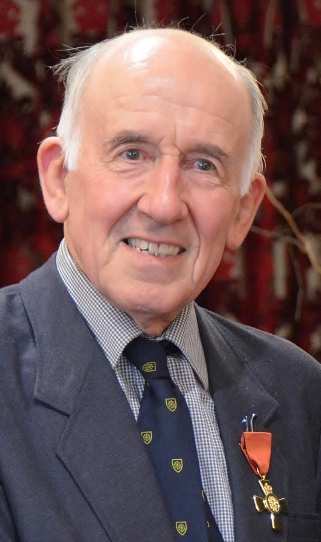
- Higham in 2016
- Born: 1939 (age 86–87)
- Children: Thomas Higham

Academic background
- Education: University of Cambridge

Academic work
- Institutions: University of Otago
- Doctoral students: Helen Leach, Foss Leach

Charles Franklin Wandesforde Higham ONZM (born 1939) is a British-born New Zealand archaeologist most noted for his work in Southeast Asia. Among his noted contributions to archaeology are his work (including several documentaries) about the Angkor civilization in Cambodia, and his current work in Northeast Thailand. He is an emeritus professor at the University of Otago in Dunedin.

== Early years and education ==
Higham was educated at Raynes Park County Grammar School in South London. It was here that he developed an interest in archaeology after volunteering to excavate at the Bronze Age site of Snail Down and Arcy sur Cure in France. In 1957, he was offered a place at St Catharine's College, Cambridge to read archaeology and anthropology. However, being too young for National Service, he spent two years at the Institute of Archaeology, London University, specialising in the archaeology of the western Roman provinces under Sheppard Frere. During his time at the institute, he excavated at the Roman city of Verulamium, and the Iron Age site of Camp du Charlat in France. In 1959, he went up to Cambridge, and studied the Neolithic Bronze and Iron Ages of Europe.

He was provided with a State Scholarship in 1962, and embarked on his doctoral research on the prehistoric economic history of Switzerland and Denmark. In 1966 he was awarded his doctorate. In 1964, he married Polly Askew. They have two sons and two daughters. One of his sons, Thomas Higham, is also an archaeologist.

== Career ==
Following the completion of his doctorate, Higham accepted a lectureship in archaeology at the University of Otago, and in 1966 moved to New Zealand with his family. In 1968, he was appointed the foundation professor of anthropology at the University of Otago. Following a visit to the University of Hawaii, he was invited by Professor W.G. Solheim II to undertake research in Thailand, and in 1969, he began his fieldwork with excavations in Roi Et and Khon Kaen Provinces. He joined Chester Gorman between 1972 and 1975 for excavations at Ban Chiang, Banyan Valley Cave, and has subsequently excavated the sites of Ban Na Di (1981–1982), Khok Phanom Di (1984–1985), Nong No (1989–1992), Ban Lum Khao (1995–1996), Noen U-Loke (1999–2000), Ban Non Wat (2002–2007) and Non Ban Jak (2011–2017).

His research at the Bronze Age sites of Ban Non Wat has shown that the initial Bronze Age in this part of Southeast Asia began in the 11th century BC. With his son, Thomas, Professor of Archaeological Science at Oxford University, he has re-dated the site of Ban Chiang, showing that there too, contrary to claims from the University of Pennsylvania, bronze casting also began in the 11th century BCE.

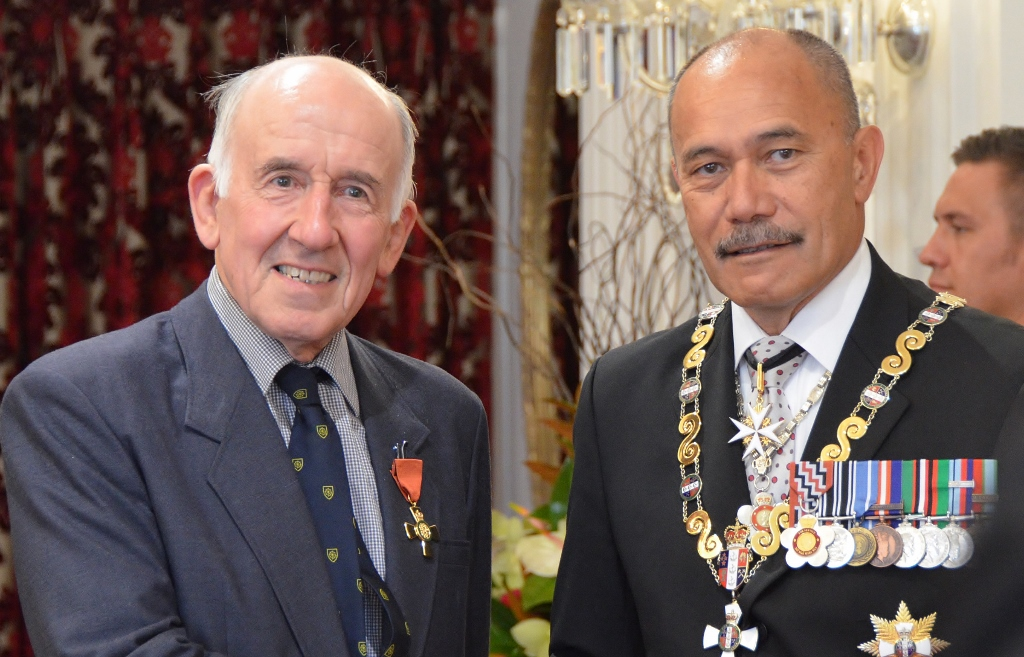
Higham (left) in 2016, at his investiture as an Officer of the New Zealand Order of Merit, by the governor-general, Sir Jerry Mateparae

Charles Higham is an International Fellow of the British Academy, an Honorary Fellow of St. Catharine's College Cambridge, a former Fellow of St. John's College, Cambridge and a Fellow of the Royal Society of New Zealand. In 2012, he was awarded the Grahame Clark Medal of distinguished research in archaeology by the British Academy. He was awarded the Mason Durie medal by the Royal Society of New Zealand in 2014, the citation noting that he is New Zealand's premier social scientist. In the 2016 New Year Honours, Higham was appointed an Officer of the New Zealand Order of Merit for services to archaeology.

Higham is a member of the editorial advisory board of the archaeology journal Antiquity.

== Selected publications ==
=== Books ===
- Higham, C. F. W. & Kijngam, A. (1984). Prehistoric excavations in northeast Thailand: Excavations at Ban Na Di, Ban Chiang Hian, Ban Muang Phruk, Ban Sangui, Non Noi and Ban Kho Noi. British Archaeological Reports, International Series 231 (i–iii). Oxford. 960 pp.
- Higham, C. F. W. (1989). The archaeology of mainland Southeast Asia. Cambridge: Cambridge University Press. 387 pp.
- Higham, C. F. W. & Bannanurag, R. (1990). The excavation of Khok Phanom Di. Volume I: The excavation, chronology and human burials. London: The Society of Antiquaries of London & Thames and Hudson. 387 pp.
- Higham, C. F. W. & Bannanurag, R. (eds.). (1991). The excavation of Khok Phanom Di. Volume II: The biological remains, Part 1. London: The Society of Antiquaries of London & Thames and Hudson. 388 pp.
- Higham, C. F. W. & Thosarat, R. (eds.). (1993). The excavation of Khok Phanom Di. Volume III: The material culture, Part 1. London: The Society of Antiquaries of London. 288 pp.
- Higham, C. F. W. & Thosarat, R. (1994). Khok Phanom Di: Prehistoric adaptation to the world's richest habitat. New York: Harcourt Brace Jovanovich. 155 pp.
- Higham, C. F. W. (1996). The Bronze Age of Southeast Asia. Cambridge: Cambridge University Press.
- Higham, C. F. W. & Thosarat, R. (eds.). (1996). The excavation of Khok Phanom Di. Volume IV: The biological remains, Part II (by G. B. Thompson). London: The Society of Antiquaries of London. 312 pp.
- Higham, C. F. W. & Thosarat, R. (eds.). (1999). The excavation of Khok Phanom Di. Volume V: The people (by N. G. Tayles). London: The Society of Antiquaries of London. 386 pp.
- Higham, C. F. W. & Thosarat, R. (1998). The excavation of Nong Nor, a prehistoric site in central Thailand. Oxford: Oxbow Books; University of Otago Studies in Prehistoric Anthropology No. 18.
- Higham, C. F. W. & Thosarat, R. (1998). Prehistoric Thailand: From first settlement to Sukhothai. Bangkok: River Books; London: Thames and Hudson. 226 pp.
- Higham, C. F. W. & Thosarat, R. (1999). Siam derk damboran: Yuk korn boran. Bangkok: River Books. 236 pp. (Thai)
- Higham, C. F. W. (2001). The civilization of Angkor. London: Weidenfeld and Nicolson.
- Higham, C. F. W. (2002). Early cultures of mainland Southeast Asia. Bangkok: River Books.
- Higham, C. F. W. (2003). Cambodge: Grandeur de l'Empire khmer. Bagneux; Zurich; Quebec; Brussels: Sélection du Reader's Digest. 192 pp. (French)
- Higham, C. F. W. (2004). Encyclopaedia of early Asian civilizations. New York: Facts On File. 422 pp.
- Higham, C. F. W. (2004). Vesunkenes Reich Kambodscha. Stuttgart; Zurich; Vienna: Reader's Digest. 192 pp. (German)
- Higham, C. F. W. & Thosarat, R. (2004). The excavation of Khok Phanom Di. Volume VII: Summary and conclusions. London: The Society of Antiquaries of London. 182 pp.
- Higham, C. F. W. (2005). Az angkori civilizáció. Budapest: Gold Books. 253 pp. (Hungarian)
- Higham, C. F. W., Kijngam, A. & Talbot, S. (eds.). (2007). The origins of the civilization of Angkor. Volume II: The excavation of Noen U-Loke and Non Muang Kao. Bangkok: The Fine Arts Department of Thailand. 632 pp.
- Higham, C. F. W. & Kijngam, A. (eds.). (2009). The origins of the civilization of Angkor. Volume III: The excavation of Ban Non Wat: Introduction. Bangkok: The Fine Arts Department of Thailand.
- Higham, C. F. W. & Kijngam, A. (eds.). (2010). The origins of the civilization of Angkor. Volume IV: The excavation of Ban Non Wat: The Neolithic occupation. Bangkok: The Fine Arts Department of Thailand.
- Higham, C. F. W. & Kijngam, A. (eds.). (2012). The origins of the civilization of Angkor. Volume V: The excavation of Ban Non Wat: The Bronze Age. Bangkok: The Fine Arts Department of Thailand.
- Higham, C. F. W. & Kijngam, A. (eds.). (2012). The origins of the civilization of Angkor. Volume V: The excavation of Ban Non Wat: The Iron Age, summary and conclusions. Bangkok: The Fine Arts Department of Thailand.
- Higham, C. F. W. & Thosarat, R. (2012). Early Thailand: From prehistory to Sukhothai. Bangkok: River Books.
- Higham, C. F. W. (2013). The origins of the civilization of Angkor. London: Bloomsbury.
- Higham, C. F. W. (2014). Early Southeast Asia: From the first humans to the civilization of Angkor. Bangkok: River Books.
- Higham, C. F. W. & Kijngam, A. (eds.). (2021). The origins of the civilization of Angkor. Volume VI: The excavation of Non Ban Jak. Bangkok: The Fine Arts Department of Thailand.
- Higham, C. F. W. (2021). Digging deep: A journey into Southeast Asia's past. Bangkok: River Books.
