= Non Ban Jak =

Archaeological site in Nakhon Ratchasima province, Thailand

- โนนบ้านจาก (Thai)
- Excavation at Non Ban Jak

- Location in Thailand
- Interactive map of Non Ban Jak
- 15°15′30″N 102°10′13″E
- Type: Archaeological site
- Periods: Late Iron Age to pre-Angkorian
- Cultures: Pre-Angkorian
- Location: Lamkhohong subdistrict, Non Sung district, Nakhon Ratchasima province

History
- Formed: 3rd or 4th century CE
- Abandoned: 8th or 9th century CE

Non Ban Jak (Thai: โนนบ้านจาก) is an archaeological site south of Ban Nong Khruea Chut (บ้านหนองเครือชุด), Non Sung district, Nakhon Ratchasima province, northeastern Thailand. It is a large oval occupation mound, dated to the 4th to 8th or 9th centuries CE. Excavation has placed occupation between the 3rd or 4th century CE and about 700 to 820 CE. The site is enclosed by two moats and banks, built in the 4th and 5th centuries CE.

Clay-floored houses have been found, with graves cut through their floors, together with evidence of rice cultivation, weaving, and pottery manufacture. Excavation has also recovered Phimai Black kilns, evidence of local ironworking, and spindle whorls read as household cloth production. The glass beads from its graves have been traced to southern India or Sri Lanka. Lead isotope analysis has shown that its copper did not come from the nearest sources, in central Thailand. In the uppermost layer, the black burnished pottery of the late Iron Age gives way to vessels resembling those of Dvaravati sites in central Thailand. That change has been read as local adoption of the technology, not the arrival of a new population. Its cemetery has yielded 137 individuals. Fourteen of the 55 adults carry skeletal injuries, a higher prevalence than at Ban Non Wat and Noen U-Loke.

Differences in grave goods and in markers of childhood stress, between the two mounds and between the sexes, have been read as evidence of status differences within the community. A later study of the tooth enamel found the childhood stress evenly spread across the community. Its dental remains carry a high prevalence of congenitally missing teeth, which has been taken to suggest that the settlement was founded from nearby Noen U-Loke. Dental health improved over the course of the occupation. The burials within the houses have been read as marking family ownership of land improved by the ancestors. No religious motifs, texts, or seals had been found in the first three excavation seasons, which was read as casting doubt on how far the new states of Chenla reached the upper Mun valley. Buddhist symbols have since been reported from the site. With the neighbouring mound of Non Muang Kao, it has been read as giving the first clear evidence in the valley of a transition from prehistory into the earliest historical or pre-Angkorian period.

== Site and chronology ==
=== Layout and buildings ===
Topographic map of the Non Ban Jak site, showing the western and eastern elevated mounds separated by a central depression

The site lies 8 km west of Noen U-Loke. The mound is oval, with a maximum length of 360 m and a width of 170 m. It is enclosed by two broad moats and banks, and comprises an eastern and a western mound with a lower area between them. With its two moats, the site covers about 530 by 350 m. The area enclosed by the moats has been put at about 13 ha. The eastern mound is almost wholly the product of occupation, its deepest deposits lying at the level of the present rice fields. The western mound is shallower, at most three metres, and is taken to be the natural rise on which settlement began. The two mounds are contemporaneous.

Excavation has found plastered clay floors, wooden sleeper beams, and wattle-and-daub walls. In one area, these overlie an earlier Phimai Black kiln and an iron ploughshare. Rooms were clearly defined. The first settlers lived in small wattle-and-daub houses. The later residences were more substantial, with broad wall foundations and large posts carrying the walls and roof.

=== Dating ===
The site has been dated to between 1,700 and 1,100 years before present. The 2017 season is reported to have found an initial Neolithic occupation, and the season of January 2018 Bronze Age pottery. The two moats and banks were built in the 4th and 5th centuries CE. The moats were at one time read as defensive. A later reading takes them to have been dug to control the water supply as the area became more arid. Occupation of the western mound began between 220 and 380 CE, passed into its third layer around 460 to 530 CE, and ended around 700 to 820 CE. The base of the eastern mound was occupied in the 5th century CE. Freshwater bivalve shells placed with the dead date mortuary activity to the 4th, 5th, and early 6th centuries CE. Two dates from the uppermost layer are close in age to the layer beneath, which suggests that material there may have become intermixed. The latest phase of occupation extends, at least at some level, well into the pre-Angkorian period, in the 8th and potentially the 9th century CE.

== Findings ==
=== Artefacts ===
Artifacts recovered from excavations at the Non Ban Jak site

Small kilns with Phimai Black ceramics in place have been reported from the site. One circular enclosed kiln, 1.20 m across, was built of clay tempered with rice straw, had an air channel, and held at least eight vessels in place. A socketed iron implement lay with those vessels. Its asymmetric profile and wings suggested to local rice farmers that it was a ploughshare and not a spade. A concentration of iron slag on the eastern mound indicates local ironworking, although it is too early to be sure whether this represents smelting or smithing.

The graves held 513 copper-base artefacts, mostly bracelets, with ear, finger, and toe rings, belts, anklets, and bells. Only 60 came from domestic contexts, although the 664 square metres opened were concentrated there. A single possible crucible fragment was recovered, and no moulds or furnaces. The geology of the upper Mun flood plains is incompatible with copper mineralisation, so any copper-base object from the site is taken to be an import, whether as raw metal or as a finished piece. Most, if not all, are thought to have arrived finished, though a foundry may lie in an unexcavated part of the site. The scarcity or absence of moulds and crucibles across the later Iron Age sites of the valley has also been read as pointing to regional foundries that supplied ornaments to consumer sites such as this one. By then iron had replaced bronze for tools and weapons.

Lead isotope, elemental, and microscopic analysis of 79 of the funerary artefacts found no pure or near-pure metal, which is consistent with the absence of local production. Corrosion is heavy enough that the elemental figures describe the alloys qualitatively and not quantitatively. Silver alloys are called a regionally new feature of the assemblage. Eleven samples carry significant silver, six of them a high proportion of it. Two of the six have a silver-rich layer over a copper core. No mercury was detected, which excludes amalgam silvering. Immersion or depletion silvering remain the intentional options, against a deep and regular post-depositional corrosion. The 'bimetallic' rings taken during excavation for bronze and iron are corroded unleaded bronzes with a high iron content, copper and iron being unalloyable at the temperatures available. The analysed artefacts group more closely by object type than by alloy, which has been read as demand driven by the shape of the finished piece, not by the properties of the metal.

Thirty-five spindle whorls were recovered. Over a thousand were found at Ban Non Wat, 8 km to the east. One whorl in the form of a door knob comes from a context of the 6th to 8th centuries CE. It is paralleled in the late Iron Age burials at Tha Kae in central Thailand, and whorls of the type first occur at South Indian sites on prehistoric trade routes. Flat disc whorls from the upper layers are lighter than those from earlier contexts and would have suited cotton.

=== Plant remains, ornaments and ceramics ===
Rice parts make up 83% of the plant remains, and 96% of the rice spikelet bases carry the scar of domesticated rice. Rice processing waste went into daub and into kiln building. The weed assemblage differs from that of Bronze Age and early Iron Age Ban Non Wat, c. 790–200 BCE, and from the Metal Age sites of Khao Sam Kaeo and Phukhao Thong, c. 400–100 BCE. The dryland weed Acmella paniculata, predominant at those sites, is absent, while Fimbristylis spp. and Chara zeylanica appear, which had not been reported from any other site in Thailand. The difference between the two assemblages has been read as a transition from the weeds of dry rice fields to those adapted to wet cultivation.

Close to 3,200 glass beads have been catalogued from the site, all of them from graves. Most are of a mineral soda-alumina glass from Sri Lanka or southern India, present in every excavated context. Two are of a potash glass of the type usually associated with the early Iron Age and the South China Sea network. Such glass is rare here, read as consistent with the site's date. The dark blue beads are of a soda-lime glass imported from the west, possibly from Mesopotamia. No dark blue glass coloured with cobalt has been found among the dominant type, which could mean a bead maker had to turn to a second source for that colour. The same glass has been identified at Ban Non Wat and Noen U-Loke.

Burials here, at Ban Non Wat, and at Noen U-Loke have yielded gold rings, beads, and earrings. The purity of that gold is close to that of gold from Non Phon Lan, Phukhao Thong, and Khuan Luk Pad, a similarity read as exchange reaching the Khorat Plateau from the southern peninsula.

The disturbed upper half-metre to metre of deposit contains fine wheel-turned earthenware of Indic style, with stylised wave, impressed circle, and red painted designs. The uppermost layer held pits containing broken pottery vessels and the bones of large deer, cattle, and water buffalo, and an extensive shell midden. Those vessels resemble in form and finish the pottery of Dvaravati sites in central Thailand, and contrast sharply with the black burnished Phimai Black repertoire of the late Iron Age. Pottery of that kind is characteristic of Dvaravati central Thailand from the sixth century CE, and the late occupation also includes structural foundations associated with a clay figurine of the Buddha.

=== Burials and the excavated sample ===
A room within a house at Non Ban Jak contained three graves cut through the floor. A wall has collapsed over one of them

Burial was by primary inhumation, as at other Iron Age grounds in the province, among them Ban Non Wat, Noen U-Loke, Ban Suai, and Prasat Phanom Wan. The dead were laid out supine and extended. Graves were cut through house floors and lie on the same orientation as the walls. Three graves in one room on the eastern mound were accompanied by lip-to-lip Phimai Black vessels set in three of its surviving corners. Beads of carnelian and agate, and ornaments of bronze, have also been reported from the graves. Red ochre was found in three graves, all of adults, one male, one female, and one probably female. It lay in nodule form near the head, the hand, the femur, and the lower body, and two of the three were buried in the same house. One grave held a woman interred with two infants and a headless man, read as an aggrandizer of exceptional status.

Four mortuary phases were identified in the western mound. Infants are a high proportion of the dead in all four phases, 16 of the 32 graves of the first. Infants were interred in lidded ceramic vessels. Iron sickles became regular offerings in the third and fourth phases. The mortuary wealth so far found falls far short of that of Iron Age 3 at Noen U-Loke and of its contemporary final phase.

The burials studied were lifted during four seasons from 2011 to 2015. Of the 141 burials first identified on the site plans, post-excavation analysis counted 137 individuals, once misidentified animal bone and graves with no surviving bone were set aside and two partial skeletons counted as one. Of these, 78 were children under 15 and 55 adults, 23 of them female, 18 male, and 14 unsexed. Preservation is very good for a Thai sample of this period, and 53 skeletons were articulated and more than three quarters complete. The assemblage has been described as the largest Iron Age skeletal collection so far recovered in the region. Fourteen, 11 of them children, were buried on the eastern mound in layers of the 5th century CE; the other 123 lay in the western mound cemetery among the houses.

A grave-goods analysis of the 47 adults with secure age and sex estimates found that western individuals received significantly more goods than eastern ones. Males and later burials received significantly more goods, while the rise with age was not significant. Later burials held more ceramics, metal, and utilitarian items, and western burials more ornaments, though small samples left the effects of date and mound entangled. Once the difference between the mounds was allowed for, the gap between males and females closed over time.

=== Human remains ===
Burials with ochre at Non Ban Jak: (A) burial 72 (MP3), male with ochre near the face; (B) burial 76 (MP3), female with ochre near the right ankle; and (C) burial 38 (MP3), female with ochre near the right knee.

Fourteen of the 55 adults, 25.5 percent, carry injuries received before or around the time of death, 20 lesions in all, of which three had not healed. None of the 78 children shows any injury. The difference between women and men is not significant. Fractures of the long bones are few, six among 456 complete bones. Five of the six are forearm fractures of the distal third, four of them on the right side, and every fractured radius belongs to a woman. Five adults have broken ribs, two have broken toes, and no major bone of the leg is broken. Most of the injured adults, 13 of 45, come from contexts dated between about 300 and 600 CE, and only one of the ten adults of the last mortuary phase, after 600 CE, shows any injury.

Three of the adults have injuries to the head. An older woman has a healed depressed fracture of the right frontal bone, and a man healed blows to the nasal bones. A young man has a healed cut on the right parietal and three unhealed cuts that pierce the left parietal. No one has both cranial and postcranial injuries.

Western individuals were taller, with lower subadult mortality and a lower prevalence of linear enamel hypoplasia, enamel defects left by interrupted growth in childhood. Of the long bones, only the radius reached statistical significance, and the difference in enamel defects did not. The comparison is offered with caution, the samples being small. The indicators conflict between the sexes. Female mortality, stature, and enamel-defect prevalence all fell over time, while the male figures moved the other way.

A later study of the same teeth, at higher magnification, found growth-disruption defects in 47 of the 48 individuals it examined, with episodes falling between about 1.4 and 5.5 years of age. A single episode lasted about three months, and a childhood carried some nine months of disrupted growth, which that study found far longer than in the forager groups it took for comparison. Because almost everyone was affected, it found no difference between the mounds, between the sexes, or across the mortuary phases, in prevalence or in any other measure it took. The one exception was the spacing between episodes, which it put down to sample size. Individuals buried later in the occupation had their first episode younger and recovered from it more quickly.

A study of the permanent dentition of 70 individuals found carious lesions in 4.8 percent of tooth positions, antemortem loss in 3.4 percent, and advanced wear in 15.5 percent. Women had more caries and more antemortem loss than men, and men more advanced wear. Dental health was poorer among the earlier burials and among those of the eastern mound. Caries fell from 8.3 to 2.2 percent between the earlier and the later burials, although neither the crop nor the method of cultivation changed. The same study put the proportion of children under 15 among the dead at 0.58. From that it derived a total fertility rate of 6.7 and a rate of natural population increase of 4.2 percent, the second highest so far calculated for prehistoric mainland Southeast Asia. Such a rate could not have held for long, and is read as covering decades or at most one or two centuries. Estimated maternal mortality was high among the earlier burials and low among the later ones. Two possible cases of leprosy and nine of tuberculosis have been reported, all but one from the western mound.

Agenesis, the congenital absence of a tooth, is unusually common at the site. Of 64 individuals with at least one anterior tooth position observable, 56 percent were missing a tooth to it, rising to 74 percent in the smaller group whose four lateral incisor positions could all be read. Almost all the missing teeth are lateral incisors, and the left side is affected more often than the right. The diagnosis rests on examination by eye without radiographs, and the differences between the mounds and between the mortuary phases are not statistically significant.

== Interpretation ==
=== Settlement and economy ===
The plastered floors, sleeper beams, and wattle-and-daub walls have been taken to suggest a housing complex or town. Gaps between the walls of adjacent structures have been identified as walkways or town lanes. The small kilns with Phimai Black ceramics have been read as local, village-level production. The small number of spindle whorls has been read as household production of cloth, unless it is a function of the smaller area excavated. Indian contact has been inferred from the door-knob whorl. Non Ban Jak, Ban Non Wat, and Noen U-Loke have been read as linked to a South Indian or Sri Lankan network which may have emerged as late as about 200 CE.

The consistency of the iron sickles in the third and fourth phases has been read as marking a group closely involved in rice cultivation. Whether the community was poorer, perhaps with less involvement in the salt trade, or whether richer graves of the latest Iron Age remain to be found, has been left open. The founding of a new moated settlement late in the Iron Age points to a growing population.

The first settlers are considered likely to have split from a long-established centre such as Noen U-Loke or Ban Non Wat. A study of congenitally missing teeth has since argued for Noen U-Loke in particular, where the condition reaches a high prevalence, while none has been found at Ban Non Wat. It is offered as a possibility, with the alternative that the two settlements shared an ancestry distinct from Ban Non Wat's. That study found no ancient DNA published for the site, and the trait has been held elsewhere to be unsuitable for estimating relationships between populations. Thirty-eight genomes have since been recovered, disclosing deep ancestry, demographic change, and whether those interred in a house were related by marriage or by descent. The transition has been described as a change in the nature of settlement, involving residential complexes, a ceramic tradition combining indigenous and external qualities, and the modification of encircling earthworks in support of an agricultural surplus.

=== Exchange and metal supply ===
The site stands at a choke point for exchange, east of a pass over the Phetchabun range that links the Khorat Plateau to the plains of central Thailand. The Mun gives a way east to the Mekong and the Lao uplands. The upper Mun was itself a major source of salt.

None of the 79 analysed artefacts is consistent with the copper of the Khao Wong Prachan Valley, 165 km west and the nearest producing area, or with that of Phu Lon, 325 km north. Consumers at the site did not take their metal from the nearest source. Copper production in central Thailand continued through the occupation, and the mismatch is therefore not an effect of chronology. The Vilabouly Complex in central Laos, 450 km northeast, supplied some of the copper but is no longer read as the dominant source. Its bowtie ingots are inconsistent with the material from the site; its conical and bowl ingots are partly consistent. Further producers remain unidentified, possibly within the Complex itself. Some of the leaded artefacts are consistent with the lead of Song Toh in west-central Thailand, 350 km west, whose chronology and technology are unstudied. Lead from there would have crossed the copper-producing region of central Thailand on its way to the plateau without drawing on its copper.

The isotope signatures separate the earlier burials from the later ones, which could be read as supply networks shifting in the 6th century CE. Lead concentrations are substantially lower in the earlier burials, so the trend may be one from unleaded to leaded alloys and not a change of source. The isotope data cannot establish the trend reliably.

Artefacts from Lovea, Prei Khmeng, and Phum Snay in northwestern Cambodia are consistent with material from the site. Bronzes from a first-century CE burial at Phum Snay share a signature with ornaments from two burials of mature men at Non Ban Jak. So far as is known, this is the first archaeometric link between the grave goods of particular individuals in different countries of mainland Southeast Asia. Since the linked individuals are all mature men, the pattern has been read as supporting arguments for matrilocality in the region, which rest mainly on strontium isotope studies. On pottery, glass, funerary practice, and now metal, the site is read as an active member of a Mekong interaction sphere, probably exchanging salt for exotic goods. Southern Indian copper deposits have been proposed for investigation as possible sources of the unmatched signatures. The grounds are seven centuries of contact with South Asia, imported stone-working and glass, and limited ancient DNA evidence for South Asian individuals in Cambodia in the early centuries CE. The proposal is not advanced as certain.

=== Neighbouring centres and early states ===
Non Ban Jak and Non Muang Kao are among the large late Iron Age mounds of the valley thought likely to have continued growing into the pre-Angkorian period, creating multiple competing centres. The late prehistoric occupation of Non Ban Jak overlapped by at least two centuries with the establishment of cities and temples in the lower Mun area.

No religious motifs, texts, or seals had been found in the first three excavation seasons, which called into question how far the new states of Chenla penetrated the late Iron Age communities of the upper Mun valley. Buddhist symbols have since been reported at the site, among them lion imagery and statuettes of the Buddha, appearing at the same time as the three ochre burials. The two have been read together as a religious and cosmological shift under South Asian contact, in which ancestral veneration gave way to more codified ideas.

Pottery comparisons at the site and at Ban Non Wat across the late Iron Age and the proto-historic period have been read as showing that the resident population was not replaced by incoming Dvaravati people. The pottery changed gradually, the technology being adopted and adapted locally.

The near absence of injury in the last mortuary phase has been read either as an accident of the sample or as a quieter interval before Angkorian incursions, as relations with the Dvaravati culture of central Thailand developed. The excavated sequence has been described as that of a late Iron Age town occupied at the threshold of state formation.

=== Burial, health and violence ===
On evidence from the site, inhumation may have continued well into the terminal Iron Age, at least at some sites in the valley. The three graves with corner vessels have been read as a room designated for burial. The alternative, that both buildings were occupied and the graves cut after they were abandoned, is considered unlikely, given the orientation and regular placement of the graves and the position of the vessels. Burial within houses, read as residential burial, has not been recorded elsewhere in northeast Thailand, although that has been disputed. A later review holds that it produced the dispersed pattern of the later graves and probably occurred at Noen U-Loke too, where no house remains survived. The practice has been read as expressing a family's ownership of land taken and improved by its ancestors, by analogy with Maya, Mesopotamian, and Postclassic Oaxacan practice. Later in the occupation the dead were laid within houses rather than in the tight family clusters of the preceding period, and their graves are markedly poorer in exotic goods, at a time when knowledge of Buddhism was being absorbed. If it proves to have been earlier and more widespread, the argument that it marks the beginning of landholding would need revisiting.

If the high proportion of infants among the dead reflects the real situation, it is among the highest recorded in prehistoric Southeast Asia. Since no grave overlies another, the precedence of the first phase remains under review.

Most of the forearm, clavicle, rib, and toe fractures have been read as accidents of more intensive and hazardous farming and animal husbandry in a drying environment. The later enamel study linked the unusual length of the stress episodes it measured, tentatively, to that same intensification of farming under falling rainfall. It read the uniformity of the stress, with the shortening recovery times of later burials, as a community that may have been adapting and becoming more resilient. A regional model of the period predicts that health in the upper Mun valley worsened in the late Iron Age. The dental evidence from the site runs the other way, health improving over the occupation. That is attributed to the shortness of the settlement's history and to its use of wet rice farming from the outset, where the longer established Ban Non Wat and Noen U-Loke had to convert to it. The dental profile of the site is closer to that of Noen U-Loke than to that of Ban Non Wat.

The craniofacial injuries and one possible parry fracture have been read as violence. Women and men were buried alike, with no evident difference in health, and the pattern has not been read as gendered violence, though violence against women has not been ruled out. Both the prevalence of injury and the long bone fracture rate are higher than at Ban Non Wat and Noen U-Loke, read as a riskier way of life than at those contemporary neighbours. The prevalence is close to that of Phum Snay in northwestern Cambodia, at 26.4 percent. The injuries there are mostly blunt and sharp force trauma to the skull, and the graves hold weapons, a pattern read as a distinctly different trajectory. Soft tissue injury leaves no trace, and anyone killed away from the settlement and not carried back for burial is outside the record.

=== Status and social structure ===
The two mounds have been read as the neighbourhoods of two social groups. The excavators took the thicker house walls of the eastern mound, and the iron sickles concentrated in western graves, as marking the eastern group as the higher in status. The grave-goods analysis found the opposite distribution. Two interpretations are drawn from this. The first attributes high male mortality to frailty under stress, and rising male stature to frail children dying before adulthood; against it, enough males survived to form defects and reach adulthood to suggest moderate robusticity. The second, which the study prefers, treats low female mortality and low female defect prevalence as products of selective mortality, few girls living long enough to form defects, while survivors fell short of their growth potential. High neonatal mortality at the site, read as a sign of maternal stress, is taken to support it.

The western mound is read as the less stressed part of the community and the eastern as its more impoverished and more stressed members. The higher prevalence of farming injuries in the eastern mound is taken to mark an agricultural labouring class. The alternative, that shorter eastern stature indicates less stress rather than more, is rejected on the eastern mound's high subadult mortality and enamel defects, the second of which the later enamel study did not confirm.

Spatial analysis found no segregation of the dead by age, sex, or health, and isotopic work has shown little movement of isotopically distinctive people into the region in the Iron Age. Groups of ornaments worn by one person often came from a single source, and the same sources served men, women, and infants and recur across the mortuary phases. No restriction has been found between the source of an ornament and the phase, age, or sex of its wearer. No juvenile at the site was buried with ochre, which has been read as possibly reflecting adult mobility, with individuals bringing the practice from other regions, which ongoing isotopic work may clarify. The mounds are taken not to represent different populations, although isotopic evidence cannot exclude the arrival of isotopically similar groups.

Inscriptions in inland Cambodia attest polities with distinct social classes contemporary with the site, classes thought to have formed out of ranked lineage groups. From that parallel, the difference between the mounds is argued to reflect a kinship-based class structure, and residential burial is hypothesised as the mechanism by which such classes formed and were legitimised. Whether the mound areas belonged to houses or to classes is left open, as is whether ownership reached the surrounding farmland. No bunded rice fields have been found in prehistoric northeast Thailand, against the bunded fields read as evidence of private landholding in Iron Age Cambodia. The conclusion drawn is that sex- and class-related status differences may have existed at the site, and that low status related to poorer health. A later assessment holds that the differences between the mounds cannot yet be shown to mark two social classes, since it is not known whether the community was ordered hierarchically or heterarchically. Heterarchical organisation has not been ruled out.
