= Thomas Higham (archaeologist) =

New Zealand archaeologist

Thomas Higham FRSNZ
- Citizenship: New Zealand
- Spouse: Katerina Douka
- Parent: Charles Higham

Academic background
- Education: University of Otago; University of Waikato

Academic work
- Discipline: Archaeology
- Sub-discipline: Radiocarbon dating; Neanderthal extinction; early human migrations
- Institutions: University of Oxford; Keble College, Oxford; Research Laboratory for Archaeology and the History of Art; University of Vienna Department of Evolutionary Anthropology

Thomas F. G. Higham is an archaeological scientist and radiocarbon dating specialist. He has worked as Professor of Archaeological Science at the University of Oxford, UK, where he was the Director of the Oxford Radiocarbon Accelerator Unit (ORAU) in the Research Lab for Archaeology and the History of Art. He is best known for his work in dating the Neanderthal extinction and the arrival of modern humans in Europe. He is Professor in the Department of Evolutionary Anthropology at the University of Vienna. Higham is the son of archaeologist Charles Higham.

== Early life and education ==
Higham grew up in Dunedin, New Zealand, the eldest of four children of Polly and Charles Higham; his father is an archaeologist specialising in the prehistory of southeast Asia. After completing his secondary education at Otago Boys' High School, he studied Archaeology at the University of Otago, receiving a BA Honours degree in 1988 and a master's degree in 1990. Higham became interested in radiocarbon dating and moved to the University of Waikato where, in 1993, he obtained a DPhil degree at the Department of Chemistry.

== Career and research ==
Higham worked as the Deputy Director of the radiocarbon dating laboratory at Waikato, before joining the Research Laboratory for Archaeology and the History of Art, at the University of Oxford in 2001. He became the Director of the Oxford Radiocarbon Accelerator Unit (ORAU) in 2018 and was a Fellow by Special Election at Keble College.

Higham's work focuses on the development and reliable application of radiocarbon dating in archaeology. His main interests lie in the refinement of the protocols used for the purification of ancient samples prior to radiocarbon dating. His early work focused on the peopling of New Zealand. Upon arrival in Oxford, Higham became involved in testing and improving the ultrafiltration method for dating archaeological bones.

In 2001, Higham met British archaeologist Roger Jacobi and the two worked closely together on the dating of several key Palaeolithic sites from the British Isles, until Jacobi's death in 2009. The most notable result of this work was the redating of the Red Lady of Paviland, an iconic early modern human from Britain. Later, Higham reported an age estimate for the Kents Cavern maxilla from Devon, England, the earliest modern human fossil in northwestern Europe.

Since 2006, Higham and his team at Oxford have worked on defining the timing of Neanderthal replacement by anatomically modern humans in western Eurasia and quantifying the overlap between the two human groups. In 2014, results of this work reported in Nature placed Neanderthal extinction at around 41000–39000 years ago, and suggested a Neanderthal-modern human overlap of 3000–5000 years in Europe. In 2013, funded by the European Research Council, Higham launched the "PalaeoChron" Project that focuses on the dating of late Neanderthals, early modern humans and Denisovans at hundreds of sites across northern Eurasia.

Higham has featured in CNN's series Finding Jesus.

In 2018, Higham was elected an honorary Fellow of the Royal Society of New Zealand. He was awarded a Distinguished Alumni Award from the University of Waikato in 2018.
