= Khao Wong Prachan =

Hill and archaeological valley in Lopburi province, Thailand

- เขาวงพระจันทร์
- Location in Thailand

Highest point
- Elevation: 650 m (2,130 ft)
- Coordinates: 14°57′41″N 100°42′37″E

Geography
- Location: Lopburi province
- Country: Thailand

Khao Wong Prachan (Thai: เขาวงพระจันทร์) is a hill in Huai Pong subdistrict, Khok Samrong district, Lopburi province, central Thailand. It rises about 650 m above sea level and has been described as the highest in the province. A temple, Wat Khao Wong Phra Chan, stands at its foot, and a stairway of some 3,790 steps runs from the temple to the summit.

The Khao Wong Prachan valley, one of three copper-producing regions of prehistoric mainland Southeast Asia examined in studies of early metallurgy, carries the same name. The others are the Vilabouly Complex in central Laos and Phu Lon on the southern bank of the Mekong. Of the three the valley is the best documented.

== Geography ==
The hill lies about 28 km from the town of Lopburi. Its sides are curved ridges, so that from any direction it appears as an encircling ring, and the name has been explained from that shape. The observation, and the name, have been attributed to the monk Luang Pho Opasi (หลวงพ่อโอภาสี), who climbed it in 1953. A local legend derives the name instead from Nang Prachan (นางพระจันทร์), daughter of the giant Thao Kokkhanak (ท้าวกกขนาก), the hill having been called "Khao Nang Prachan" (เขานางพระจันทร์).

Wat Khao Wong Phra Chan stands at the foot, where a large seated Buddha image in the Maravijaya posture, in Chiang Saen style, is reported as the largest in Lopburi province. From the temple a stairway of about 1,680 m climbs to the summit through forest, gently in places and steeply in others, and takes roughly two hours. A Buddha footprint is enshrined at the top, with Buddha images, the Mahayana figures of Guanyin and Guan Yu, and a cave named for Nang Prachan. A February festival in honour of the footprint draws many visitors, among them Thais of Chinese descent.

== Khao Wong Prachan valley ==
Mining and casting sites in the valley have been excavated and reported as part of work on the region's metal industries.

=== Mines and production sites ===
The two production sites of the valley are Non Pa Wai and Nil Kham Haeng. Both lie close to the nearest copper mines on the Lopburi Plain, at Khao Tab Kwai and the hill known as Khao Phu Kha (เขาภูคา), and a little further from several other local mines. The valley's sequence has been treated as central to understanding how copper production began and changed during prehistory. Until the valley was investigated, no metal working using copper rather than one of its alloys had been identified in the region. The Neolithic cemeteries of the Lopburi region, which lie where the mines later operated, carry shell beads and turtle carapaces whose forms match those from the coastal settlement of Khok Phanom Di. The Neolithic of central Thailand has been treated as one region, comprising the Takli Undulating Terrain, this valley and the lower course of the Lopburi River. Occupation of the lacustrine margins of the Lopburi river system began by the start of the second millennium BCE, evidenced mainly in the basal layers of Tha Kae, Non Pa Wai, Khok Charoen and Sab Lamyai. At least three substantial outcrops of copper ore lie in the valley, with ore-processing and smelting sites in their vicinity. The valley has more sources of ore than Phu Lon and was worked more intensively. Its processing and smelting localities lie a couple of kilometres from the probable mines, whereas at Phu Lon ore processing was carried out at the mine itself. The ore deposits are rich in both iron and copper, and carry malachite, chrysocolla and chalcopyrite; both oxidic and sulphidic ores were smelted. A third site, Non Mak La, was examined in 1985. A square of 5 by 4 m there yielded 3,500 kg of copper slag, derived from an incompletely weathered sulphide ore, with copper prills carrying up to 5.5 percent arsenic. An arrowhead from the site was of unalloyed copper with up to 0.8 percent arsenic, which was set against the known hardening effect of arsenic at one or two percent in a finished object.

=== Copper production ===
Parts of the valley were occupied before 1500 BCE, with no evidence that metal was used or produced there. The excavators of the processing sites placed the start of their sustained use some time after 1500 BCE. Mining began about 1050 to 1000 BCE, at the same time as at Vilabouly Complex. By the eleventh century BCE the mines were open, and two metal founders were buried in the basal deposit at Non Pa Wai with bivalve moulds for casting socketed axes. Specialists in mining, smelting and casting were established in the valley by this time; whether any of them were based at or visited Ban Non Wat on the Khorat Plateau cannot yet be determined.

Between about 1000 and 850 BCE at least some of the copper reaching Ban Non Wat came from the valley's mines and production sites. The lead isotope signatures of three analysed specimens from that phase are compatible with copper mined there, and at least two axes of the same phase were cast in copper consistent with the valley's signature. Output reached its height between about 850 and 420 BCE, when casting was established at Ban Non Wat and at the other sites of the plateau. Production continued into the early Iron Age, from about 420 BCE, although by then Vilabouly supplied much of the copper in Southeast Asia. The valley's evidence for copper smelting has been read as showing that copper-base metallurgy there could have originated in the exchange of information and the development of a local tradition. The surge in copper production here by at least 1000 BCE has also been read as the first plausible context for local origins of iron working. Analysis of the copper slag from Non Mak La identified a rich haematite ore used as a flux in copper smelting, needed to stop the highly siliceous ore reducing to a porous and brittle sinter, and the haematite deposits are locally available. One iron object from Non Mak La came from a mortuary context dated to about 600 to 500 BCE, reported from a personal communication.

The valley lies on the exchange route linking central Thailand with the communities of the Khorat Plateau. Its mines lay about 150 km west of Ban Non Wat, and its settlements have been seen as possible transit points for the marine shell prized there for ornaments. Cordiform implements from the valley had reached Ban Non Wat on the Khorat Plateau by the early Iron Age.

=== Smelting technology ===
Co-smelting of oxidic and sulphidic ores together has been proposed for the valley, at about 1250 °C and in a sulphur-rich atmosphere. The reaction requires no fixed installation, and dry wood fuel would have been sufficient to drive it.

The valley's crucibles are a distinct variant: unspouted, unlagged and larger than those used elsewhere in the region, about 12 cm high. They are portable and were heated internally, and have been identified only in the valley and at Khao Sai On, some 20 km to the south. The crucible type common elsewhere in Southeast Asia has not been identified in the valley. Ceramic furnace chimneys, portable, reusable and pierced with holes, are also distinctive of the valley. No tuyeres have been found with them, so the air supply is inferred; wind and bellows have both been suggested, and the valley's dry-season winds proposed as the source.

The valley's production was oriented toward higher output, larger batch sizes and more nucleated working, with several steps carried out in close proximity. Most of the equipment nevertheless remained portable. The enormous number of ingot moulds has been read as showing that the valley supplied raw material for casting on site and probably at other locations. No alloying or tin processing has been found at any site in the valley, and the products were almost entirely unalloyed copper. No tin source lies nearby. Whether this technology was locally invented or transmitted from outside has not been settled; continuity has been noted in the casting of blind sockets. Choosing between a single and a multiple origin for metal working in East and Southeast Asia was held in 1989 to be impossible, although the smelting of sulphide copper ores high in arsenic in the valley, perhaps as early as the late third millennium BCE, was said to favour a multiple origin.
