= Non Muang Kao =

Archaeological site in Nakhon Ratchasima province, Thailand

- โนนเมืองเก่า (Thai)
- Location in Thailand
- Interactive map of Non Muang Kao
- 15°12′55″N 102°17′13″E
- Type: Archaeological site
- Periods: Late Iron Age to pre-Angkorian
- Cultures: Pre-Angkorian
- Location: Lum Khao subdistrict, Non Sung district, Nakhon Ratchasima province

Site notes
- Area: c. 330 rai (53 ha)

Non Muang Kao (Thai: โนนเมืองเก่า) is an archaeological site in Ban Dong Plong (บ้านดงพลอง), Non Sung district, Nakhon Ratchasima province, northeastern Thailand. It is a large oval occupation mound, dated to the 1st to 6th centuries CE. Excavation has found clay floors and wall foundations, and a small number of burials. With the neighbouring mound of Non Ban Jak, it has been read as giving the first clear evidence in the valley of a transition from prehistory into the earliest historical or pre-Angkorian period.

In 2011, the provincial governor moved to have the archaeological sites of the upper Mun basin in Non Sung district listed as a UNESCO World Heritage property. The property was called The Upper Mun River Basin Archaeological Sites, Non Sung, Nakhon Ratchasima (แหล่งโบราณคดีลุ่มแม่น้ำมูลตอนต้น โนนสูง นครราชสีมา), a name covering the basin rather than a single site. The area was given as five locations in the district, namely Ban Non Wat, Ban Lum Khao, Ban Prasat, Non Muang Kao, and Noen U-Loke.

== History ==
The site is named, with Noen U-Loke, among those whose occupation appears to have been abandoned in the 5th and 6th centuries CE. It is also named among the large Late Iron Age mounds of the valley thought likely to have continued growing into the pre-Angkorian period, creating multiple competing centres. The transition at the two mounds has been described as a change in the nature of settlement, involving residential complexes, a ceramic tradition combining indigenous and external qualities, and the modification of encircling earthworks in support of an agricultural surplus.

== Site and excavation ==
The mound covers about 330 rai (53 ha) and is enclosed by two moats. Iron ore occurs commonly near the surface. Excavation has revealed extensive housing structures, including plastered floors, post holes, graves lined with plaster, and clay floors with doorways and internal wall structures. Floors and wall foundations were traced in the same fashion as at Non Ban Jak, with lip-to-lip pots in the corners of rooms and burials beneath the floors. The excavated area was relatively small, however, and no structural plans have been traced.

Few burials were recovered, partly because of poor preservation. Those found were interred with glass, agate, and bronze and iron jewellery, with fine Phimai Black vessels, and with an abundance of burnt rice. Ritual deposits of a lidded pot were first identified here and at Noen U-Loke.
