= Ban Na Di =

Archaeological site in Thailand

- Location in Thailand
- Interactive map of Ban Na Di
- 17°15′22″N 103°08′02″E
- Type: Archaeological site
- Periods: Bronze Age, Iron Age
- Location: Pung Ngoo subdistrict, Nong Han district, Udon Thani province

History
- Founded: c. 8th–5th century BCE

Site notes
- Excavation dates: 1981

Ban Na Di is a prehistoric archaeological site at the same name village in Pung Ngoo subdistrict (ตำบลพังงู), Udon Thani province, northeast Thailand. It lies in the Sakon Nakhon Basin, in the northern reaches of the Khorat Plateau, about 20 km south of Ban Chiang. Burials at the site have yielded ornaments of marine shell and stone, and silk from two Bronze Age graves dated to between 900 and 500 BCE. Bronze was cast on the site through the Bronze Age and into the Iron Age.

== Burials ==
The Bronze Age layers and burials are dated to about 800 to 500 BCE on human bone collagen, which places them with the fourth and fifth Bronze Age phases at Ban Non Wat. Of 36 Bronze Age burials only three individuals wore bronze, 23 bangles between them, and of 24 burials of the following Iron Age phase four wore bronze ornaments. Early Iron Age occupation and burials date from the fifth century BCE. The site's remote position, away from the natural exchange routes that cross the upper Mun valley, has been suggested as relevant to the absence here of the elite burials found at the upper Mun valley sites. The small and possibly unrepresentative areas excavated at the three northern sites have also been offered for that absence, with the remote position preferred.

An earlier series of determinations rested on charcoal from clay-lined casting furnaces, hearths and a thick charcoal layer sealing a pit, contexts described as assured. A 2011 review held that these must be regarded as mixed samples with no charcoal speciated, so that each determination is at best a terminus post quem. The same review suggested a span of 600 to 400 BCE for the two Bronze Age cemetery phases and the Iron Age graves that follow them seamlessly, all three sharing one grave orientation.

Graves at the site contained bracelets of marine shell and disks of exotic stone. No sourcing data are available to separate local production of these from long-distance exchange.

Silk survives from two burials of the site's first phase, securely provenanced and dated.

Teeth from an assemblage dated to 2550–2350 years before present, about 600 to 400 BCE, show caries in 4.7 percent of teeth, antemortem tooth loss in 5.4 percent, and advanced wear in 12.0 percent. Women are affected more than men on all three measures.

== Bronze working ==
Crucibles were set in clay-lined furnaces to bring the alloy past its melting point, and stone bivalve moulds for socketed axes were recovered with them. Of 243 pieces of bronze from occupation and industrial deposits, some is casting spillage; the identifiable objects are bangles, arrowheads, fish hooks, and beads, and no axe was found. Nearly all are tin bronze, but the two beads are of leaded bronze, so the founders knew the different properties of the alloy, and the arrowheads were annealed and cold worked to harden them before sharpening. Stone bangles broken in antiquity were repaired by boring holes on either side of the break and tying the pieces with bronze wire of copper, tin, and arsenic.

Occupation continued into the early Iron Age, and the industry changed with it. Crucibles were now tempered with rice chaff in place of clay grog, bangles were cast by the lost wax method, one of them still carrying traces of beeswax, and lead became significant in the alloy.
