= Ban Lum Khao =

Bronze Age period archaeological site

Ban Lum Khao is a Bronze Age archaeological site on the Khorat Plateau of northeastern Thailand. It lies in Lum Khao subdistrict, Non Sung district, Nakhon Ratchasima province, in the upper Mun valley. Its cemetery has been read as that of an egalitarian community, several of the women buried there having been raised elsewhere.

In 2011, the provincial governor moved to have the archaeological sites of the upper Mun basin in Non Sung district listed as a UNESCO World Heritage property. The property was called The Upper Mun River Basin Archaeological Site, Non Sung, Nakhon Ratchasima (แหล่งโบราณคดีลุ่มแม่น้ำมูลตอนต้น โนนสูง นครราชสีมา). The area was given as five locations in the district, namely Ban Non Wat, Ban Lum Khao, Ban Prasat, Non Muang Kao, and Noen U-Loke. A provincial committee for the development of the basin's archaeological sites carried the same name.

== History ==
The village was probably inhabited by 1400 BC, with burial beginning 500 to 1,000 years later. Beneath the cemetery lay a Neolithic layer full of shell and ash. The cemetery itself held three layers, of the late Neolithic, the early Bronze Age and the late Bronze Age, and above it lay thin occupation layers with animal bone and pottery.

Ban Lum Khao is one of four sites in the province from which a Bronze Age frame of 3,411 to 2,354 years before present has been built for the upper Mun, with Ban Non Wat, Ban Prasat and Prasat Phanom Wan. At all four, occupation and burial continue into the Iron Age cultural layer.

An excavation 10 by 15 m and 1.7 m deep exposed the village cemetery. It held 112 burials with the remains of 110 individuals, 59 of them adults.

== Burial practices ==
The three mortuary phases contain two burial treatments, wrapped bodies and coffined ones. Bodies in the wrapped group were probably bound tightly in bark or fibrous matting, which decayed slowly enough for the labile joints to decompose first. These skeletons show constriction, with no limb lying outside the line of the shoulders, and their ribs and vertebrae had collapsed. Their hands and feet remained articulated, so the soft tissue decayed while the body was held in place. The wrapped group consisted of 9 women and 5 men.

The second treatment was burial in a coffin. That group consisted of 11 women and 1 man. Here the bones had moved extensively, the ribs and vertebrae were disarticulated, constriction was bilateral, and soil had not replaced the soft tissue as it had in the wrapped group. The pattern is read as burial in narrow, log-like coffins with concave bases. The preponderance of women raised the possibility that treatment was gendered, but the difference is not statistically significant and the sample's sex ratio is uneven.

== Social organization ==
The even distribution of grave goods through the cemetery has been read as the mark of an egalitarian society. Most adult burials held pottery, and over 400 complete vessels came from the site. Cooking pots and serving vessels occur in the burials of men, women and children alike, as do stone adzes, spindle whorls, shell bangles, pig and fish bones, and shell beads. The differences that do appear are slight. Adult women's graves held a little more than adult men's, and children were more often buried with copper bivalve molds and adzes than adults were.

Not everyone buried at the site had grown up there. Strontium isotope ratios (^{87}Sr/^{86}Sr) in tooth enamel set several groups of women apart from those raised locally, and each group was associated with particular pottery styles, which has been read as women marrying in from other communities.

== Health and daily life ==
Male stature and bone mass vary more widely than female, which has been taken to indicate different diets, particularly in childhood. The male stature range of 22.5 cm, against 14.3 cm for women, has been read as some men not reaching their genetic potential for height. Women's remains had more caries, while men more often showed wear as well as cavities.

Osteoarthritis is more frequent in the male remains, which has been taken to show a difference in daily activity and heavier strain on men's joints. Of 7 fractures, in 6 individuals, 4 had healed well, and at least one of the injured was aging. This has been read as care for the injured within the community.
