= Katerina Douka =

Archaeological scientist

- Born: c. 1980 (age c. 44)
- Citizenship: Greek
- Occupation: W2 Group Leader (Archaeology)
- Spouse: Tom Higham

Academic background
- Education: Oxford University
- Thesis: Investigating the Chronology of the Middle to Upper Palaeolithic Transition in Mediterranean Europe by Improved Radiocarbon Dating of Shell Ornaments (2011)
- Doctoral advisor: Robert E. M. Hedges

Academic work
- Discipline: Archaeological Science
- Sub-discipline: Archaeology
- Institutions: Max Planck Institute for the Science of Human History, Department of Archaeology RLAHA
- Website: http://www.katerinadouka.com

Katerina Douka (born c. 1980) is an archaeological scientist whose work focuses on the spatio-temporal pattern of human dispersals and extinctions across Eurasia, including Neanderthals, Denisovans and modern Homo sapiens.

== Education ==
Douka completed a B.Sc. in archaeological conservation at the Technological University of Athens, Greece in 2004, followed by an M.Sc. in archaeological science at the University of Oxford, U.K. Her Masters dissertation was titled Seasonality of Neanderthal Occupation at Vanguard Cave, Gibraltar. She studied for her PhD at Oxford 2006–2011. Her doctoral research involved developing of a new protocol for screening and dating carbonates using radiocarbon, the CarDS or carbon density separation method. She used this new methodology to date early shell beads from Upper Palaeolithic sites across Eurasia. This work provided a new chronology for the early arrival of modern humans in the Middle East.

== Career and research ==
Following her Phd, Douka held a Junior Research Fellowship at Linacre College, University of Oxford, and a William Golding Junior Research Fellowship at Brasenose College, University of Oxford 2014–2018. During her Linacre fellowship she worked as a Postdoctoral Researcher on the “AHOB3” (Ancient Human Occupation of Britain 3) project funded by the Leverhulme Trust. During her Brasenose fellowship she worked as a Postdoctoral Researcher on an ERC funded project “PalaeoChron” (Precision Dating of the Palaeolithic of Eurasia) led by Professor Tom Higham, based at the RLAHA, School of Archaeology. In 2017, she joined the Max Planck Institute for the Science of Human History, Department of Archaeology, Jena, Germany, where she is Principal Investigator / Group Leader on the “FINDER” (Fossil Fingerprinting and Identification of new Denisovan remains in Pleistocene Asia) project funded by the European Research Council. She has pioneered the application of the ZooMS technique (Zooarchaeology by mass spectrometry) to ancient human fossils, enabling the identification of small fragments of bone on the basis of collagen proteins. Her research has provided important insights into early human migrations, the chronology of Neanderthal extinction in Europe, and the nature and chronology of the Denisovians, another distinct branch of human evolution. Her research on early human origins was featured as a research highlight by the European Research Council in 2018, with fellow grantees Tom Higham and Svante Pääbo. She is currently an assistant editor for the journal PNAS.

== Selected publication ==
- Douka, K., Slon, V., Jacobs, J., Bronk Ramsey, C., Shunkov, M.V., Derevianko, A.P., Mafessoni, F., Kozlikin, M.B. Li, Bo, Grün, R., Comeskey, D. Devièse, T., Brown, S., Viola, B., Kinsley, L., Buckley, M., Meyer, M., Roberts, R.G., Pääbo, S., Kelso, J., Higham, T. 2019. Age estimates for hominin fossils and the onset of the Upper Palaeolithic at Denisova Cave. Nature 565 (7741), 640–644.
- Douka, K., Brown, S., Higham, T., Pääbo, S., Derevianko, A., Shunkov, M. 2019. FINDER Project: Collagen fingerprinting (ZooMS) for the identification of new human fossils in Palaeolithic faunal assemblages. Antiquity 93:e1.
- Bae, C., Douka, K., Petraglia, M. 2017. On the origin of modern humans: Asian Perspectives. Science 358, 1269
- Douka, K., Higham, T. 2017. The chronological factor in understanding the Middle and Upper Palaeolithic of Eurasia. Current Anthropology 58(S17): S480-S490
- Douka, K., Grün, R., Jacobs, Z., Lane, C., Farr, L., Hunt, C., Inglis, R.H., Reynolds, T., Albert, P., Aubert, M., Cullen, V., Hill, E., Kinsley, L., Roberts, R.G., Tomlinson, E.L., Wulf, S., Barker, G. 2014. The chronostratigraphy of the Haua Fteah cave (Cyrenaica, northeast Libya). Journal of Human Evolution 66: 39–63
- Douka, K., Bergman, C.A., Hedges, R.E.M., Wesselingh, F.P., Higham, T.F.G. 2013. Chronology of Ksar Akil (Lebanon) and implications for the colonization of Europe by anatomically modern humans. PLoS ONE 8(9):e72931
