= Radiocarbon dating samples =

Handling of samples used in radiocarbon dating techniques

Samples used for radiocarbon dating must be handled carefully to avoid contamination. Not all material can be dated by this method; only samples containing organic matter can be tested: the date found will be the date of death of the plants or animals from which the sample originally came.

Samples for dating need to be converted into a form suitable for measuring the ^{14}C content; this can mean conversion to gaseous, liquid, or solid form, depending on the measurement technique to be used. Before this can be done, however, the sample must be treated to remove any contamination and any unwanted constituents. This includes removing visible contaminants, such as rootlets that may have penetrated the sample since its burial.

== Pretreatment ==
Two common contaminants are humic acid, which can be removed with an alkali wash, and carbonates, which can be removed with an acid. These treatments can damage the structural integrity of the sample and remove significant volumes of material, so the exact treatment decided on will depend on the sample size and the amount of carbon needed for the chosen measurement technique.

=== Wood and charcoal ===
Wood contains cellulose, lignin, and other compounds; of these, cellulose is the least likely to have exchanged carbon with the sample's environment, so it is common to reduce a wood sample to just the cellulose component before testing. However, this can reduce the volume of the sample down to 20% of the original size, so testing of the whole wood is often performed as well. Charcoal is less likely than wood to have exchanged carbon with its environment, but a charcoal sample is likely to have absorbed humic acid and/or carbonates, which must be removed with alkali and acid washes.

=== Bone ===
Unburnt bone was once thought to be a poor candidate for radiocarbon dating, but it is now possible to test it accurately. The constituents of bone include proteins, which contain carbon; bone's structural strength comes from calcium hydroxyapatite, which is easily contaminated with carbonates from groundwater. Removing the carbonates also destroys the calcium hydroxyapatite, so it is usual to date bone using the remaining protein fraction after washing away the calcium hydroxyapatite and contaminating carbonates. This protein component is called collagen. Collagen is sometimes degraded, in which case it may be necessary to separate the proteins into individual amino acids and measure their respective ratios and ^{14}C activity. It is possible to detect if there has been any degradation of the sample by comparing the relative volume of each amino acid with the known profile for bone. If so, separating the amino acids may be necessary to allow independent testing of each one—an agreement between the results of several different amino acids indicates that the dating is reliable. Hydroxyproline, one of the constituent amino acids in bone, was once thought to be a reliable indicator as it was not known to occur except in bone, but it has since been detected in groundwater.

For burnt bone, testability depends on the conditions under which the bone was burnt. The proteins in burnt bone are usually destroyed, which means that after acid treatment, nothing testable will be left of the bone. Degradation of the protein fraction can also occur in hot, arid conditions, without actual burning; then the degraded components can be washed away by groundwater. However, if the bone was heated under reducing conditions, it (and associated organic matter) may have been carbonized. In this case, the sample is often usable.

=== Shell ===
Shells from both marine and land organisms consist almost entirely of calcium carbonate, either as aragonite or as calcite, or some mixture of the two. Calcium carbonate is very susceptible to dissolving and recrystallizing; the recrystallized material will contain carbon from the sample's environment, which may be of geological origin. The recrystallized calcium carbonate is generally in the form of calcite, and often has a powdery appearance; samples of a shiny appearance are preferable, and if in doubt, examination by light or electron microscope, or by X-ray diffraction and infrared spectroscopy, can determine whether recrystallization has occurred.

In cases where it is not possible to find samples that are free of recrystallization, acid washes of increasing strength, followed by dating part of the sample after each wash, can be used: the dates obtained from each sample will vary with the degree of contamination, but when the contaminated layers are removed, consecutive measurements will be consistent with each other. It is also possible to test conchiolin, which is an organic protein found in shell, but this only constitutes 1-2% of shell material.

=== Other materials ===
- Peat. The three major components of peat are humic acid, humins, and fulvic acid. Of these, humins give the most reliable date as they are insoluble in alkali and less likely to contain contaminants from the sample's environment. A particular difficulty with dried peat is the removal of rootlets, which are likely to be hard to distinguish from the sample material.
- Soil and sediments. Soil contains organic material, but because of contamination by humic acid of more recent origin, it is very difficult to get satisfactory radiocarbon dates. It is preferable to sieve the soil for fragments of organic origin, and date the fragments with methods that are tolerant of small sample sizes.
- Other types of sample that have been successfully dated include ivory, paper, textiles, individual seeds and grains, straw from within mud bricks, and charred food remains found in pottery.

=== Isotopic enrichment ===
Particularly for older samples, it may be useful to enrich the amount of ^{14}C in the sample before testing. This can be done with a thermal diffusion column. The process takes about a month, and requires a sample about ten times as large as would be needed otherwise, but it allows more precise measurement of the ^{14}C/^{12}C ratio in old material, and extends the maximum age that can be reliably reported.

== Preparation ==
Once contamination has been removed, samples must be converted to a form suitable for the measuring technology to be used. A common approach is to produce a gas, for gas counting devices: CO_{2} is widely used, but it is also possible to use other gases, including methane, ethane, ethylene and acetylene. For samples in liquid form, for use in liquid scintillation counters, the carbon in the sample is converted to benzene, though other liquids were tried during the early decades of the technique. Libby's first measurements were made with lamp black, but this technique is no longer in use; these methods were susceptible to problems caused by the ^{14}C created by nuclear testing in the 1950s and 1960s. Solid targets can be used for accelerator mass spectrometry, however; usually these are graphite, though CO_{2} and iron carbide can also be used.

The steps to convert the sample to the appropriate form for testing can be long and complex. To create lamp black, Libby began with acid washes if necessary to remove carbonate, and then converted the carbon in the sample to CO_{2} by either combustion (for organic samples) or the addition of hydrochloric acid (for shell material). The resulting gas was passed through hot copper oxide to convert any carbon monoxide to CO_{2}, and then dried to remove any water vapour. The gas was then condensed, and converted to calcium carbonate in order to allow the removal of any radon gas and any other combustion products such as oxides of nitrogen and sulphur. The calcium carbonate was then converted back to CO_{2} again, dried, and converted to carbon by passing it over heated magnesium. Hydrochloric acid was added to the resulting mixture of magnesium, magnesium oxide and carbon, and after repeated boiling, filtering, and washing with distilled water, the carbon was ground with a mortar and pestle and a half gram sample taken, weighed, and combusted. This allowed Libby to determine how much of the sample was ash, and hence to determine the purity of the carbon sample to be tested.

To prepare benzene for liquid scintillation counting, the sequence begins with combustion to convert the carbon in the sample to CO_{2}. This is then converted to lithium carbide, and then to acetylene, and finally to benzene. Targets for accelerator mass spectrometry are prepared from CO_{2} by catalysing the reduction of the gas in the presence of hydrogen. This results in a coating of filamentous carbon (usually referred to as graphite) on the powdered catalyst—typically cobalt or iron.

== Sample sizes ==
How much sample material is needed to perform testing depends on what is being tested, and also which of the two testing technologies is being used: detectors that record radioactivity, known as beta counters, or accelerator mass spectrometers (AMS). A rough guide follows; the weights given, in grams, are for dry samples, and assume that a visual inspection has been done to remove foreign objects.

Sample material	Mass (g)	
Sample material	For beta counters	For AMS
Whole wood	10–25	0.05–0.1
Wood (for cellulose testing)	50–100	0.2–0.5
Charcoal	10–20	0.01–0.1
Peat	50–100	0.1–0.2
Textiles	20–50	0.02–0.05
Bone	100–400	0.5–1.0
Shell	50–100	0.05–0.1
Sediment/soils	100–500	5.0–25.0

== See also ==
- Chronological dating

== Sources ==
- Aitken, M. J. (1990). Science-based Dating in Archaeology. London: Longman. ISBN 0-582-49309-9.
- Boutton, Thomas W. & Yamasaki, Shin-ichi (eds.) (1996). Mass Spectrometry of Soils. New York: Marcel Dekker, Inc. ISBN 0-8247-9699-3
- Bowman, Sheridan (1995) [1990]. Radiocarbon Dating. London: British Museum Press. ISBN 0-7141-2047-2.
- Libby, Willard F. (1965) [1952]. Radiocarbon Dating (2nd (1955) ed.). Chicago: Phoenix.
