= Vilabouly Complex, Laos =

Archaeological site in Laos

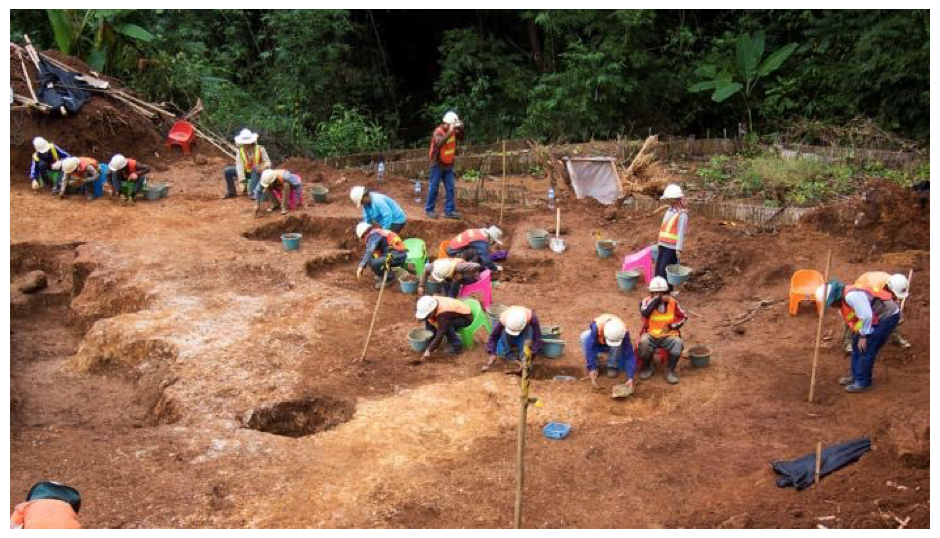
Dig Site of Peun Balo in 2009

The Vilabouly Complex is an archaeological site that is located in the Savannakhet Province in Laos which holds copper smelting and copper mining during the Iron Age. The Vilabouly Complex is significant since it puts archaeologists in a predicament of when the origin of bronze metallurgy began in Southeast Asia. It was estimated that the site was around 400BC - AD 500 as well as 1000 - 400BC reaching both the Iron Age and Bronze Age of Southeast Asia.

The site contained a lead signature that followed copper, bronze alloys, and bronze which signifies a massive source of material that can benefit metallurgy in the region. By this, the Vilabouly Complex will hold all the power of the region since it has all the resources to advance their technology during the Bronze and Iron Ages. The Vilabouly Complex and the region contained such mining sites such as Dragon Field, Peun Balo, Tengkham South D, Khanong A2, and the Malachite Cave. These sites all refer to the Iron Age but Peun Balo revealed mining in the Bronze Age continuing the predicament for Archaeologists. Research like this is vital for the Vilabouly Complex to find and understand the exact date to when the people of Southeast Asia were trading metals and sharing mining techniques. There are also other sites in region such as the Prachan Valley that shared a lot of similarities to that of the Vilabouly Complex revealing continuities for the Southeast Asian people.

== Geography of the site ==
Vilabouly Complex in the Savannkhet Province is located in a valley of the Annamite Range about 250 meters to 600 meters above sea level. Even though it is in a valley, it is still a decent amount above sea level which attributes mountain range climates. Annamite Range was a key part in mining as it was rich in materials for metallurgy; this explains the number of mines located in the Savannkhet Province. The site also resides in the Sepon Basin which allows for marine sediment and carboniferous aged continental fluvial. The mining deposits are in the sedimentary rock of the basin with a nice layer of malachite, azurite, cuprite, native copper, etc. which makes sense that the people of Southeast Asia mined out of this region. The copper that was mined out of the Vilabouly Complex was out of the sulphide deposits that were 100 meters thick which was a plentiful amount of ore during the Iron Age/Bronze Age for the Southeast Asian people. The number of sulphide deposits in the Annamite Range provided the people for a while due to a large number of mines all located along the range and basin of the Savannkhet Province.

== Materials ==
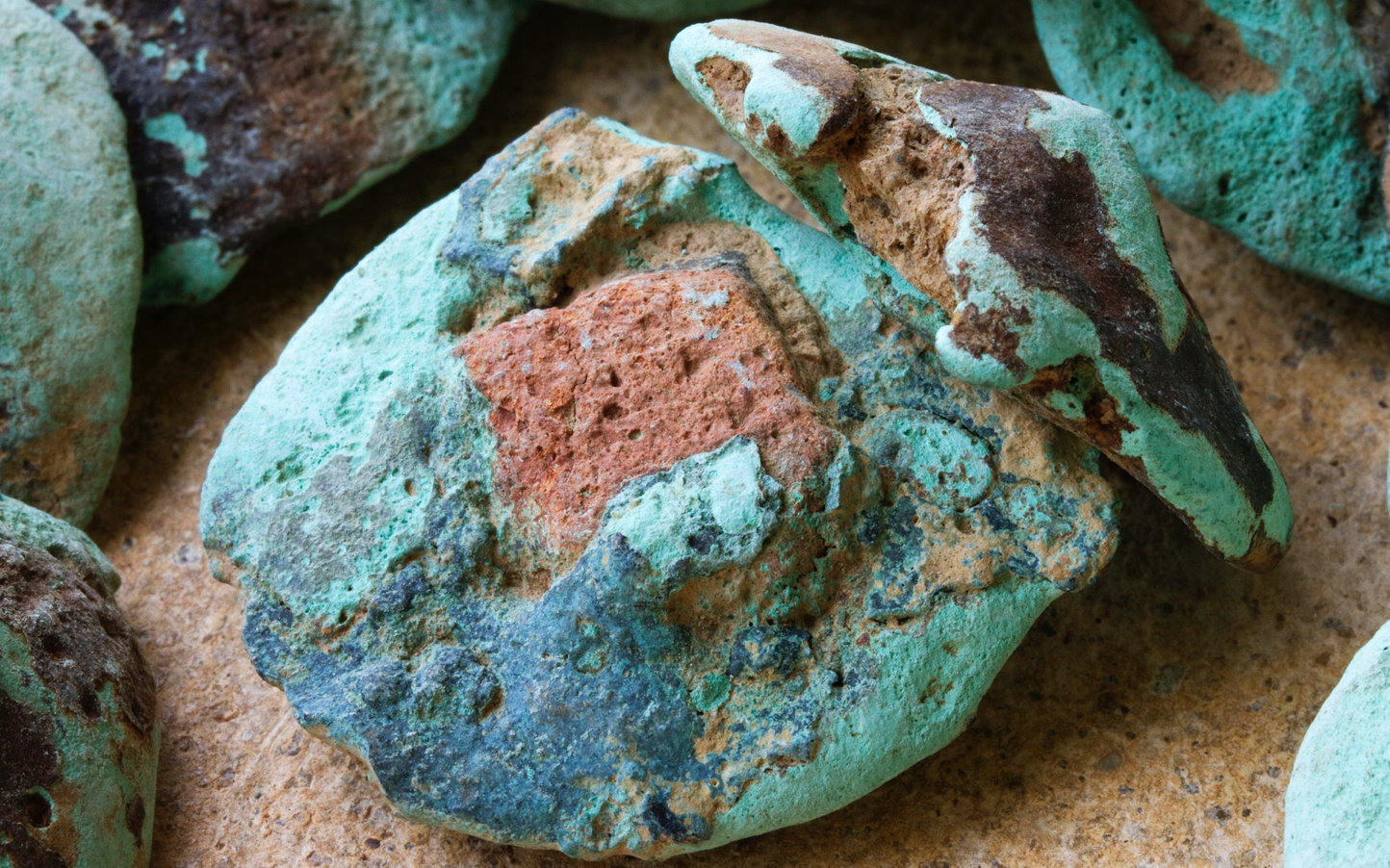
An example of a cone shaped copper ingot from the Iron Age.

Materials found at the Vilabouly complex include copper, copper alloys, malachite, and chalcocite. Small fragments of slag, which is the waste product you get from smelting ore, are also found at the sites.

Conical ingots are abundant in the complex. Most of the ingots found have a diameter of 40 to 50 millimeters and a mass of 32 to 84 grams. They are made of almost pure copper.

Excavations have found that malachite (Cu_{2}(CO_{3})(OH)_{2}), a type of copper carbonate, is plentiful in the Vilabouly complex. Chalcocite (Cu_{2}S), a secondary copper sulfide, is also found in many places in the complex, and it is often found nearby or mixed with pieces of malachite.

Excavations and mining have also found artifacts made from copper alloys, crucibles, and fragments of slag, which is all evidence for not only mining but smelting ore as well.

== Evidence of mining ==
Evidence for mining in the Vilabouly complex include mining shafts and evidence for the materials that were mined. In the complex, there are ancient wooden structures that support mining shafts at sites such as Khanong A2 and Tengkham South D. At Khanong A2, archaeologists have found over 130 well preserved mining shafts. The wood in these shafts dates to about 2000 BP. The shafts uncovered at these sites are entirely vertical, and the wooden support structures are made in eight pointed star patterns, connected at the corners with rattan fibers. There are walls made from bamboo or rattan sheets to separate the ground and the support beams.

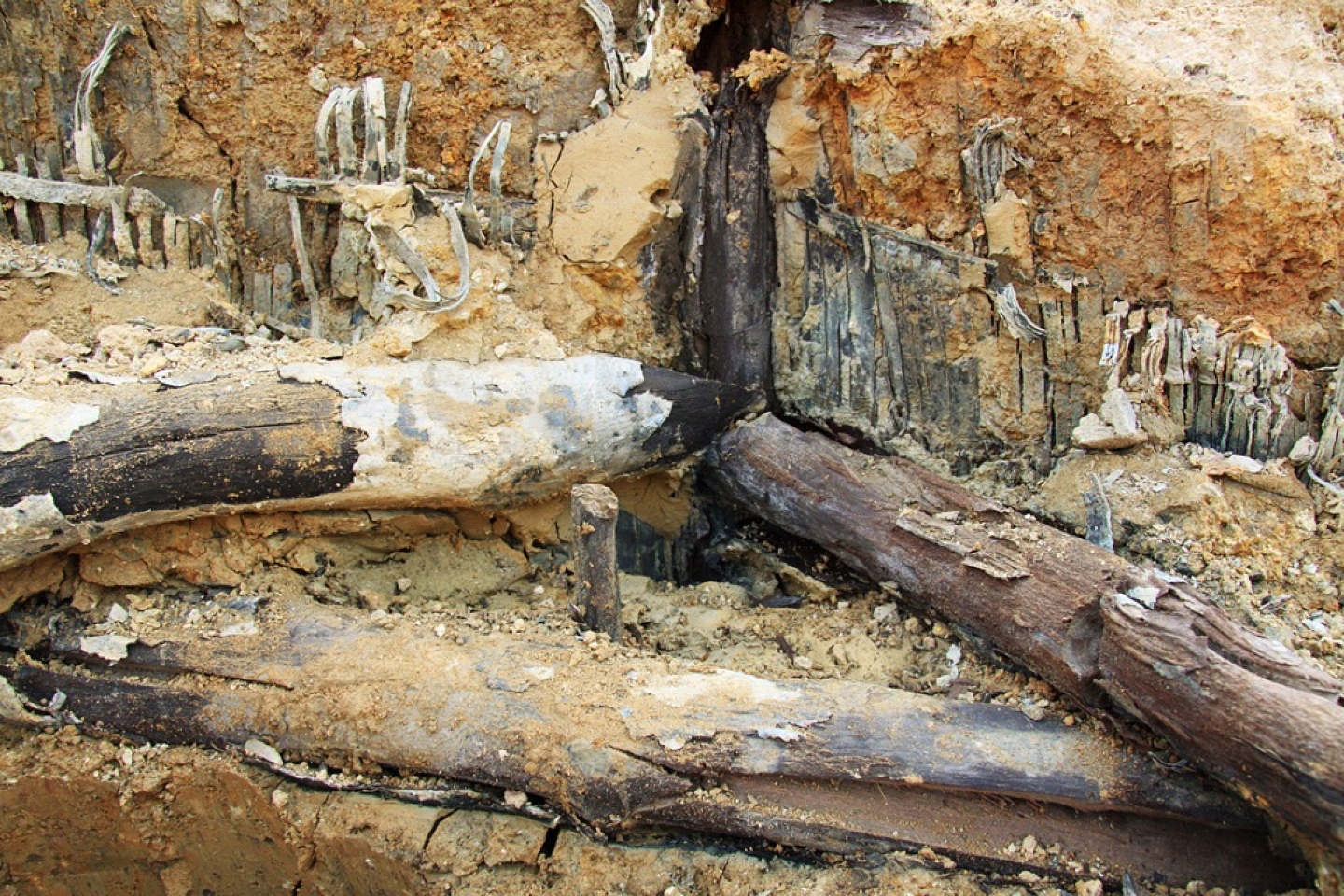
Wooden mining shaft structures and rattan bindings from the site Khanong A2.

Khanong A2's mining pit spans about 60 meters by 20 meters (about 200 feet by 100 feet). Almost all the shafts in this area have a depth around 14.5 meters (about 47 feet) but one has been excavated to 23 meters (about 75 feet) below the ground. Small pieces of rattan binding and wood from the support shafts at Khanong A2 have been radiocarbon dated to 61 +/- 38 AD and 192 +/- 39 BCE.

Mining shafts found at Tengkham South D have different structures compared to the ones at Khanong A2: some are rounded star shapes like Khanong but with an extra diagonal support beam, some are square shaped, and some have no structure at all. The square shaped shafts reach a depth of about 20 meters (about 65 feet) below the surface and are also connected at each corner with rattan fibers. The shaft without a structure may be another open-pit mine as there are no support beams, just long walls made of vertical posts, bamboo, and rattan sheets. This ‘shaft’ has been radiocarbon dated as being from around 152 +/- 28 BCE, but bamboo from the square shaft is dated to 398 +/- 27 AD.

Other evidence for mining at the Vilabouly complex includes raw materials found in the mines that can be radiocarbon dated to the same time. Copper, bronze, bronze alloys, malachite, and chalcocite have all been found at various sites in the complex. There are only five total prehistoric sites where evidence for mining and smelting copper exist, and Vilabouly is one of them.

== Iron Age versus Bronze Age ==
The conflicting radiocarbon dating of the Vilabouly complex and the sites nearby it has incited a debate on which age, the Iron Age or the Bronze Age, these sites belong to. The Bronze Age in northeast Thailand and central Laos, where Vilabouly is, occurred around 1500 BCE to 500 BCE. The Iron Age is younger, happening around 400 BCE to 400 AD.

The mining shafts’ radiocarbon dates show they were used for copper mining between 1000 BCE and 700 CE. However, the majority of the sites at Vilabouly belong to the Iron Age. One of the sites nearby, Peun Baolo, is the main cause of this debate. Evidence from Peun Baolo has been dated to be from before 450 BCE, which places it just outside the dates of the Iron Age in Laos.

According to some archaeologists, this just says that the Vilabouly complex was an important mining and copper production area starting in the Bronze Age, and then became more active in smelting and other productions during the Iron Age. Some take it even further, and think copper production flourished through the Iron Age and even a few hundred years into the ‘proto-historic’ period, from 500 AD to 700 or 800 AD.

== Similar sites to Vilabouly Complex ==
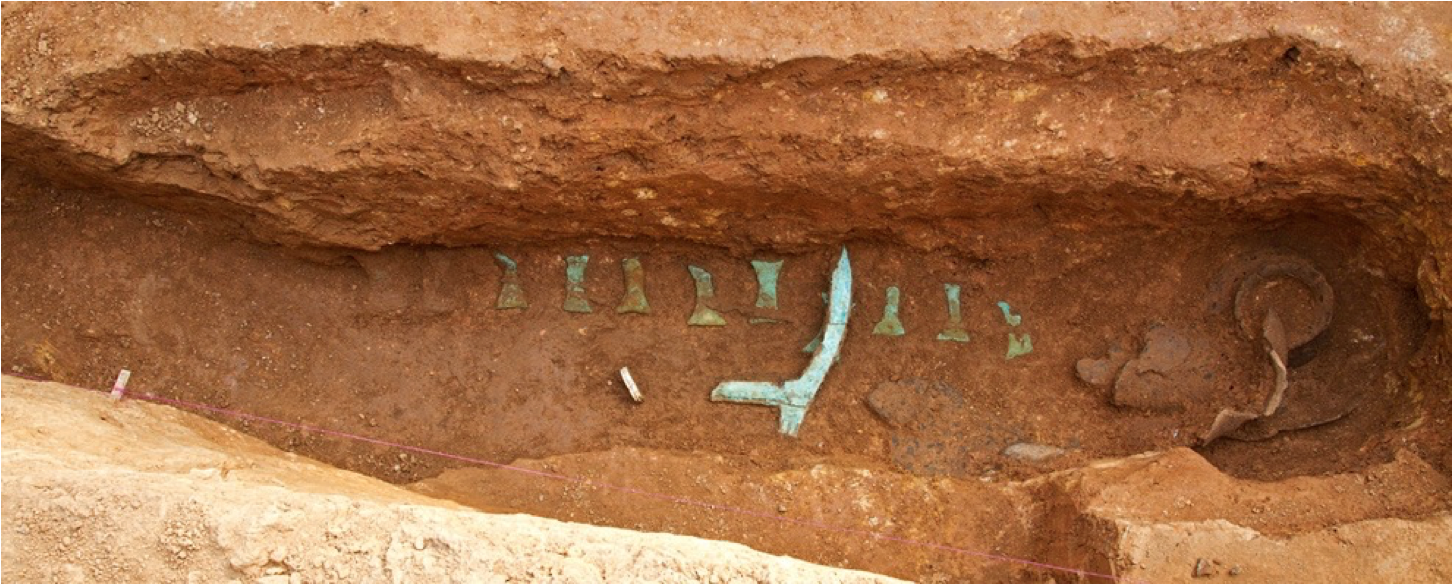
Dagger axe, pots, and copper ingots found at Peun Balo site.

A site similar to the Vilabouly Complex is the Phu Long and Khao Wong Prachan Valley which showed similar results in evidence that led to the connection between the two. The connection was lead isotopes on the copper artifacts that were discovered by archaeologists that revealed a signature similar to that of the Vilabouly Complex. This confirms that similar techniques have been widespread in Southeast Asia that creates the aspect of communication through techniques. There was no evidence of political/social similarities but this evidence at either Phu Long or Khao Wong present a different picture that may lead archeologists to a new path to understand the situation. This shows the possible complexity for the people of Southeast Asia as they were able to develop forms of mining and metallurgy and transfer that knowledge to other groups. Even though there are breakthrough evidence at Phu Long and Khao Wong, it still arises questions that contribute to more of the civilization in the area besides metallurgy production. There is also the possibility that the heterarchical miners interacted with those of the post state producers in Phu long or Khao Wong of the Prachan Valley.
