= Khok Phanom Di =

Khok Phanom Di is a prehistoric burial site located near the flood plain of the Bang Pakong River in Chonburi Province, Thailand. It is notable for its large number of burials, organized into seven mortuary phases as well as the rich burial of a middle-aged woman, believed to be a potter, who has been dubbed "The Princess of Khok Phanom Di," by excavator Charles Higham.
