= Ban Non Wat =

Village in Thailand

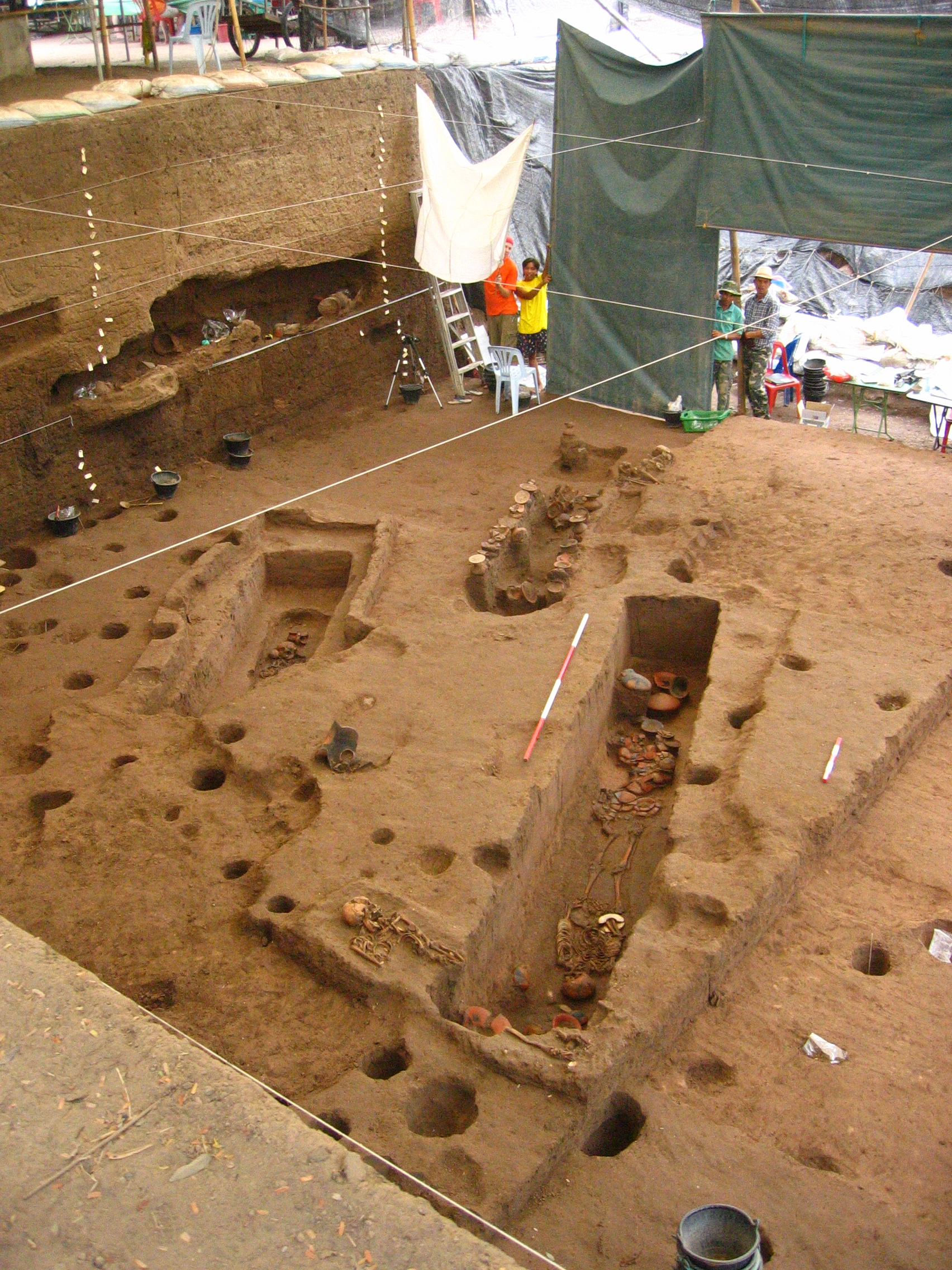
- Excavation at Ban Non wat

- Location in Thailand
- 15°16′28″N 102°16′08″E
- Type: Human settlement
- Periods: Neolithic
- Location: Non Sung district, Nakhon Ratchasima, Thailand

Site notes
- Archaeologists: Charles Higham

Ban Non Wat is a village in Thailand, in the Non Sung district, Nakhon Ratchasima Province, located near the small city of Phimai. It has been the subject of excavation since 2002. The cultural sequence encompasses 11 prehistoric phases, which include 640 burials. The site is associated with consistent occupation, and in modern-day Ban Non Wat the occupied village is located closer to the Mun River.

Excavations show that people were occupying the region during the Neolithic, Bronze, and Iron Ages. This unique sequence has been proven by 76 radiocarbon determinations treated with Bayesian analyses. Bayesian analysis is the use of Bayesian statistics to calibrate radiocarbon dates to receive a more accurate date. Soil in the Ban Non Wat area may displace the Bayesian analysis. These reveal that the initial Neolithic settlement took place in the 17th century BC, while the Bronze Age began in the late 11th century BC. The transition into the Iron Age took place in about 420 BC.

Because of disagreements about the dating and environment surrounding Ban Non Wat, questions concerning the meanings of artifacts from the digs have been raised by Doctor Joyce White. She argues that precautions weren't taken during the process of collecting dates for the site, so results of dating aren't trustworthy.

The excavations have been run by Charles Higham, and now by Dr. Nigel Chang and are partially funded by the Earthwatch institute. They are considered by some to be amongst the richest archaeological digs under current excavation.

== Neolithic ==
The Neolithic phase at Ban Non Wat has evidence of human occupation but no evidence of metallurgy. The Neolithic period is divided into an early and late phase. The earliest burials are a series of flexed burials thought to represent hunter-gatherers. These were partially contemporary with the initial Neolithic settlement by rice farmers who also raised pigs, hunted a wide range of animals, fished and collected shellfish. This was followed by a late Neolithic. Late Neolithic burials were often accompanied with ceramic vessels that are simply decorated with minimal grave goods. In addition to ceramic vessels, stone adzes, shells, and animal remains have been found in Neolithic burials at Ban Non Wat.

In 2022 the domestication of chicken was reassessed by researchers at the University of Exeter, the University of Oxford and Cardiff University. Chicken remains found in more than 600 sites in 89 countries were examined during the research project. The remains of 23 of what were thought to be the earliest chickens found in western Eurasia and north-west Africa were subjected to radiocarbon dating. Dr Julia Best, from Cardiff University, said, “This is the first time that radiocarbon dating has been used on this scale to determine the significance of chickens in early societies. Our results demonstrate the need to directly date proposed early specimens, as this allows us the clearest picture yet of our early interactions with chickens.” The oldest bones of a known domestic chicken were from Ban Non Wat, dating to between 1650BC and 1250BC.

== Bronze Age ==
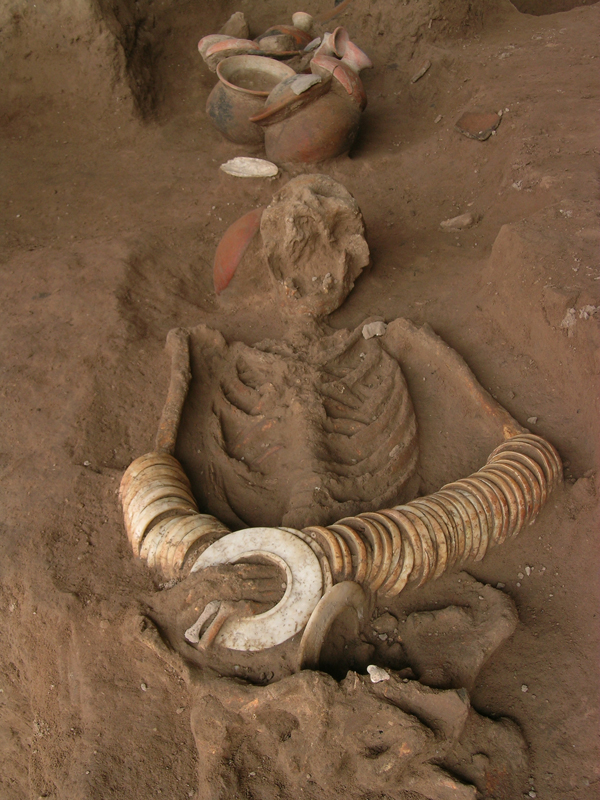
Burial from Ban Non Wat

The discovery of remarkably wealthy early Bronze Age burials illustrates profound cultural changes with the advent of copper base metallurgy. The Bronze Age at Ban Non Wat has been divided into five phases. Phase 1 occurred from 1050 to 1000 BC and consists of seven burials. Shell bracelets and necklaces as well as a copper based axe are examples of some grave goods found in Phase 1 burials. There is a dramatic increase in the amount grave goods found in burials compared to the Neolithic as personal ornamentation became a more common practice. Wrapping bodies and placing them in wooden coffins was a common practice in the Bronze Age, however there is more variability in burial contexts in the late Bronze and early Iron Ages.

Phase 2 occurred from 1000 to 850 BC. Phase 2 burials display more wealth in their grave goods. Copper-based axes, anklets, rings, as well as shell bead necklaces, belts, and earrings are some examples of grave goods found at Phase 2 burials. Phase 2 contained a wider variety of grave goods when compared to other mortuary phases.

Phase 3 occurred from 850 to 800 BC. Phase 3 burials continue the practice of wealthy burials with many grave goods and contain many of the same items from Phase 1 and 2 burials. Phase 3 burials are unique because they are facing the North-East or South-West whereas other Bronze Age burials at Ban Non Wat are mostly buried facing the North or South. Phase 3 is the last phase with wealthy burials.

Phase 4 occurred from 800 to 700 BC. There are 162 burials found in Ban Non Wat dating to Phase 4. It is at this time that the people of Ban Non Wat are being buried into specific groupings however there is no data supporting what these groups represent. Phase 4 also marks the dramatic decrease in grave goods as previously seen in Phases 1–3.

Phase 5 occurred from 700 to 420 BC. There is no clear date for the end of the Bronze Age and the beginning of the Iron Age at Ban Non Wat. Many of the burials for this phase rely on the presence of bronze grave goods instead of iron as well as the law of superposition. Phase 5 continues the practice of decreased grave goods as seen in Phase 4.

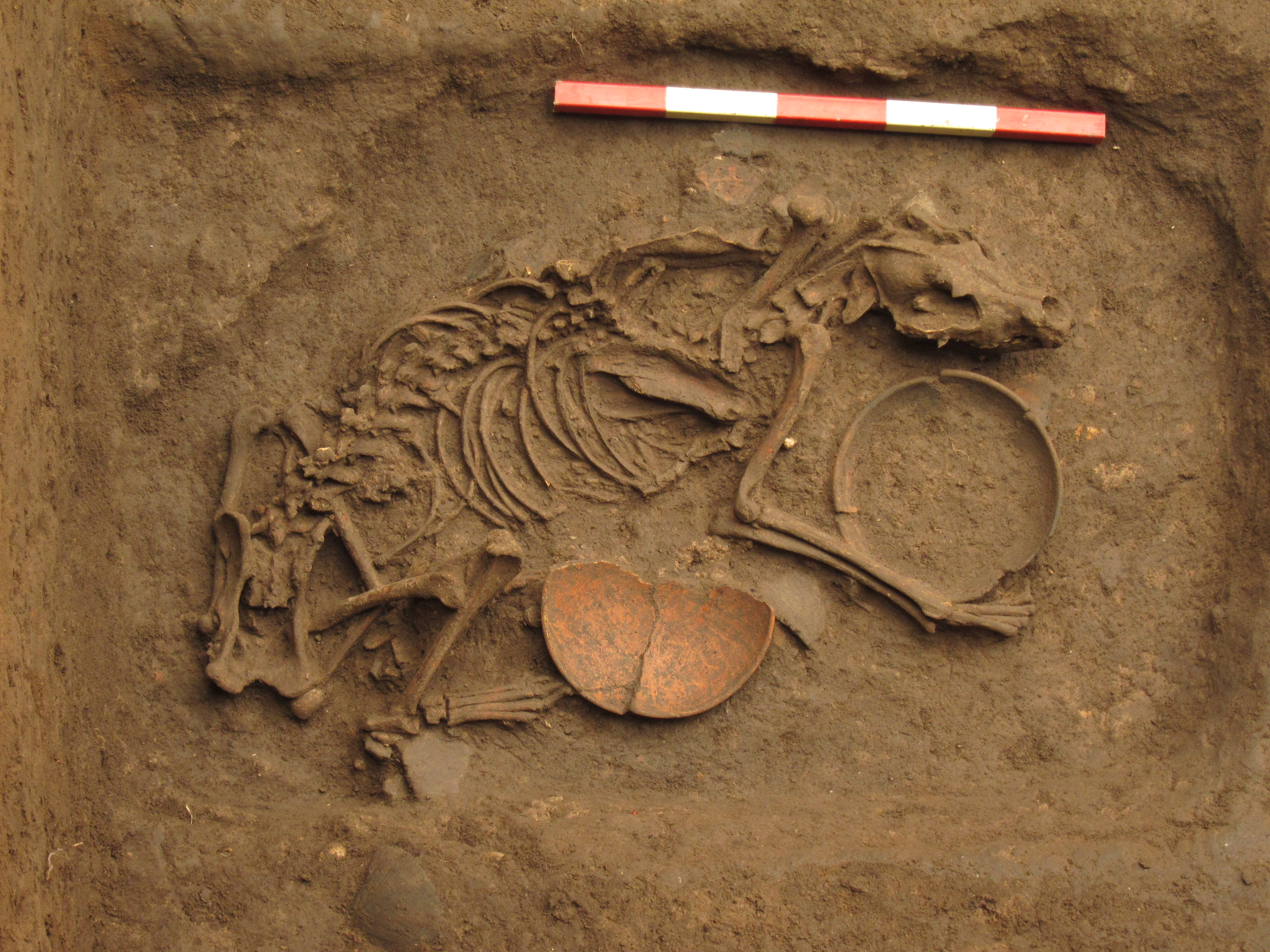
Dog burial from Ban Non Wat

One example of a unique burial at Ban Non Wat comes in the form of a dog burial that was found with two bowls, believed by archaeologists to be for food and water.

== Iron Age ==
With the Iron Age, a new range of exotic ornaments accompanied the dead, including carnelian, agate, and glass. Later in the Iron Age, the site was surrounded by banks and two moats, which involved the reticulation of water from the adjacent river round the site. The rice fields surrounding the village, although yet to be exhaustively studied, are thought to have been irrigated thousands of years ago, and preliminary dating has supported this theory. In contrast with the Bronze Age, the Iron Age provided significantly fewer burial goods.

Burials during the Iron Age at Ban Non Wat are divided into two phases. Phase 1 Iron Age burials contents are very similar to Phase 5 Bronze Age burials grave goods, with the presence of Iron goods often being the only distinguishing factor between the two. Phase 2 Iron Age burials are often noted by the presence of Phimai Black pottery in addition to iron works and exotic goods. However the amount of grave goods is still dramatically reduced compared to some Bronze Age burials.

Many of the artifacts recovered have suggested an ongoing link with the Khmer culture, unsurprising given the site's proximity to one end of the Ancient Khmer Highway, at the Phimai Historical Park.

=== Evidence for metal working ===
While excavations at Ban Non Wat are primarily about burials, recent excavations show that the residents of Ban Non Wat were likely producing their own metalworks. Archaeologists were able to uncover about a dozen working floors dating to the Iron Age. These floors were made of baked clay varying in color and texture. In addition to the floors, artifacts associated with metal working such as crucibles and bronze and iron fragments were also found at the site.

== Complications ==
The site of Ban Non Wat has accrued significant questioning that concerns several results including the Bayesian analysis, as well as the significance of the burial goods and their meanings. There is also argument on the importance of the bronze grave goods found in the burials; due to the fact that the introduction of metal had a significantly different social construct when compared to other cultures. Additionally, the soil in the area has a higher acidity due to the environment which can interfere with both digs and scientific analysis.

There is some conversation concerning the occupation of Ban Non Wat. The site has been continuously occupied since the Bronze Age, during the neolithic age the site could have been less densely populated and used as a seasonal occupation site until the Bronze Age.
